= List of moths of Canada (Geometridae) =

Partial list of Canadian moths

This is a list of the moths of family Geometridae that are found in Canada. It also acts as an index to the species articles and forms part of the full List of moths of Canada.

Following the species name, there is an abbreviation that indicates the Canadian provinces or territories in which the species can be found.

- Western Canada
  - BC = British Columbia
  - AB = Alberta
  - SK = Saskatchewan
  - MB = Manitoba
  - YT = Yukon
  - NT = Northwest Territories
  - NU = Nunavut
- Eastern Canada
  - ON = Ontario
  - QC = Quebec
  - NB = New Brunswick
  - NS = Nova Scotia
  - PE = Prince Edward Island
  - NF = Newfoundland
  - LB = Labrador

== Subfamily Alsophilinae ==
- Alsophila pometaria (Harris, 1841)-NS, PE, NB, QC, ON, MB, SK, AB

== Subfamily Archiearinae ==
- Archiearis infans (Möschler, 1862)-NS, PE, NB, QC, ON, MB, SK, AB, BC, NT
- Boudinotiana hodeberti Leraut, 2002-LB
- Leucobrephos brephoides (Walker, 1857)-QC, ON, MB, SK, AB, BC, YT

== Subfamily Ennominae ==
=== Tribe Abraxini ===
- Heliomata cycladata Grote & Robinson, 1866-NB, QC, ON
- Protitame matilda (Dyar, 1904)-AB, BC
- Protitame virginalis (Hulst, 1900)-NS, PE, NB, QC, ON, MB, SK, AB, BC, NT

=== Tribe Anagogini ===
- Cepphis armataria (Herrich-Schäffer, [1855])-NS, PE, NB, QC, ON, MB
- Cepphis decoloraria (Hulst, 1886)-NS, PE, NB, QC, ON, MB
- Metanema determinata Walker, 1866-NF, LB, NS, PE, NB, QC, ON, MB, SK, AB, BC, YT, NT
- Metanema inatomaria Guenée, [1858]-NF, LB, NS, PE, NB, QC, ON, MB, SK, AB, BC, NT
- Metarranthis amyrisaria (Walker, 1860)-NS, QC, ON
- Metarranthis angularia Barnes & McDunnough, 1917-QC, ON
- Metarranthis duaria (Guenée, [1858])-NF, LB, NS, NB, QC, ON, MB, SK, AB, BC
- Metarranthis indeclinata (Walker, 1861)-NS, PE, NB, QC, ON, MB
- Metarranthis mestusata (Walker, 1860)-NB, QC, MB, SK
- Metarranthis obfirmaria (Hübner, [1823])-NS, PE, NB, QC, ON
- Metarranthis refractaria (Guenée, [1858])-NB, QC, ON
- Metarranthis warneri (Harvey, 1874)-NB, QC, ON, MB, SK, AB
- Plagodis alcoolaria (Guenée, [1858])-NS, PE, NB, QC, ON, MB, SK, AB
- Plagodis fervidaria (Herrich-Schäffer, [1855])-ON, MB
- Plagodis kuetzingi (Grote, 1876)-NS, PE, NB, QC, ON
- Plagodis phlogosaria (Guenée, [1858])-NF, NS, NB, QC, ON, MB, SK, AB, BC, NT
- Plagodis pulveraria (Linnaeus, 1758)-NF, NS, NB, QC, ON, MB, SK, AB, BC, NT
- Plagodis serinaria Herrich-Schäffer, [1855]-NS, PE, NB, QC, ON, MB, SK
- Probole alienaria Herrich-Schäffer, [1855]-NF, LB, NS, PE, NB, QC, ON, MB, SK, AB, BC
- Probole amicaria (Herrich-Schäffer, [1855])-NF, LB, NS, PE, NB, QC, ON, MB, SK, AB, BC, NT
- Probole nepiasaria (Walker, 1860)-NS, NB
- Selenia alciphearia Walker, 1860-NF, LB, NS, PE, NB, QC, ON, MB, SK, AB, BC, YT
- Selenia kentaria (Grote & Robinson, 1867)-NS, PE, NB, QC, ON, MB, SK, AB, BC

=== Tribe Angeronini ===
- Aspitates aberrata (Edwards, 1884)-MB, SK, AB
- Aspitates conspersarius Staudinger, 1901-NF, QC
- Aspitates forbesi Munroe, 1963-MB, YT, NT, NU
- Aspitates orciferaria (Walker, [1863])-ON, MB, YT, NT, NU
- Aspitates taylori (Butler, 1893)-SK, AB, YT, NT
- Euchlaena amoenaria (Guenée, [1858])-QC
- Euchlaena effecta (Walker, 1860)-NS, PE, NB, QC, ON, MB, SK
- Euchlaena irraria (Barnes & McDunnough, 1917)-NS, PE, NB, QC, ON, MB, SK
- Euchlaena johnsonaria (Fitch, 1869)-NS, PE, NB, QC, ON, MB, SK, AB, BC
- Euchlaena madusaria (Walker, 1860)-NS, PE, NB, QC, ON, MB, SK, AB, BC
- Euchlaena marginaria (Minot, 1869)-NS, PE, NB, QC, ON, MB, SK, AB, BC
- Euchlaena obtusaria (Hübner, [1813])-NS, PE, NB, QC, ON, MB, SK, AB
- Euchlaena serrata (Drury, 1773)-NB, QC, ON
- Euchlaena tigrinaria (Guenée, [1858])-NB, QC, ON, MB, SK, AB, BC
- Lytrosis unitaria (Herrich-Schäffer, 1854)-QC, ON
- Xanthotype sospeta (Drury, 1773)-NS, PE, NB, QC, ON, MB, SK, AB, BC
- Xanthotype urticaria Swett, 1918-NS, PE, NB, QC, ON, MB, SK, AB

=== Tribe Azelinini ===
- Pero ancetaria (Hübner, 1806)-QC, ON
- Pero behrensaria (Packard, 1871)-AB, BC
- Pero honestaria (Walker, 1860)-NS, PE, NB, QC, ON, MB, SK, AB, BC
- Pero mizon Rindge, 1955-BC
- Pero morrisonaria (Edwards, 1881)-NF, LB, NS, PE, NB, QC, ON, MB, SK, AB, BC
- Pero occidentalis (Hulst, 1896)-AB, BC

=== Tribe Baptini ===
- Lomographa glomeraria (Grote, 1881)-NS, PE, NB, QC, ON, MB
- Lomographa semiclarata (Walker, 1866)-NF, LB, NS, PE, NB, QC, ON, MB, SK, AB, BC
- Lomographa vestaliata (Guenée, [1858])-NF, LB, NS, PE, NB, QC, ON, MB, SK, AB

=== Tribe Bistonini ===
- Biston betularia (Linnaeus, 1758)-NF, LB, NS, PE, NB, QC, ON, MB, SK, AB, BC, NT
- Erannis tiliaria (Harris, 1841)-NS, PE, NB, QC, ON, MB, SK, AB
- Erannis vancouverensis Hulst, 1896-SK, AB, BC
- Hypagyrtis piniata (Packard, 1870)-NS, PE, NB, QC, ON, MB, SK, AB, BC
- Hypagyrtis unipunctata (Haworth, 1809)-NS, PE, NB, QC, ON, MB, SK, AB, BC
- Lycia rachelae (Hulst, 1896)-QC, MB, SK, AB, BC, YT
- Lycia ursaria (Walker, 1860)-NB, QC, ON, MB, SK, AB, BC
- Paleacrita merriccata Dyar, [1903]-ON
- Paleacrita vernata (Peck, 1795)-NS, PE, NB, QC, ON, MB, SK, AB
- Phigalia denticulata Hulst, 1900-ON
- Phigalia plumogeraria (Hulst, 1888)-BC
- Phigalia strigataria (Minot, 1869)-QC, ON
- Phigalia titea (Cramer, [1780])-NS, NB, QC, ON, MB, SK

=== Tribe Boarmiini ===
- Aethalura intertexta (Walker, 1860)-NF, LB, NS, PE, NB, QC, ON, MB, SK, AB, BC
- Anavitrinelia addendaria (Grossbeck, 1908)-BC
- Anavitrinelia pampinaria (Guenée, [1858])-NS, PE, NB, QC, ON, MB, SK, AB, BC
- Cleora projecta (Walker, 1860)-NB, QC, ON, MB
- Cleora sublunaria (Guenée, [1858])-ON
- Dasyfidonia avuncularia (Guenée, [1858])-AB, BC
- Ectropis crepuscularia ([Denis and Schiffermüller], 1775)-NF, LB, NS, PE, NB, QC, ON, MB, SK, AB, BC
- Ematurga amitaria (Guenée, [1858])-NS, PE, NB, QC, ON, MB, SK, AB
- Epimecis hortaria (Fabricius, 1794)-ON
- Glena cognataria (Hübner, [1831])-NS, NB, QC
- Glena cribrataria (Guenée, [1858])-NB, QC, ON
- Glena nigricaria (Barnes & McDunnough, 1913)-BC
- Gnophos macguffini Smiles, 1978-BC, YT, NT, NU
- Hesperumia latipennis (Hulst, 1896)-BC
- Hesperumia sulphuraria Packard, 1873-NS, PE, NB, QC, ON, MB, SK, AB, BC, NT
- Iridopsis clivinaria (Guenée, [1858])-BC
- Iridopsis ephyraria (Walker, 1860)-NB, QC, ON, MB, SK, AB
- Iridopsis humaria (Guenée, [1858])-NS, QC, ON, MB, AB
- Iridopsis larvaria (Guenée, [1858])-NF, LB, NS, PE, NB, QC, ON, MB, SK, AB, BC
- Iridopsis vellivolata (Hulst, 1881)-NS, PE, NB, QC, ON, MB, SK
- Neoalcis californiaria (Packard, 1871)-BC
- Orthofidonia exornata (Walker, 1862)-NS, PE, NB, QC, ON, MB, SK, AB, BC
- Orthofidonia flavivenata (Hulst, 1898)-NS, NB, QC, ON, MB
- Orthofidonia tinctaria (Walker, 1860)-NS, PE, NB, QC, ON
- Protoboarmia porcelaria (Guenée, [1858])-NF, LB, NS, PE, NB, QC, ON, MB, SK, AB, BC, NT
- Stenoporpia excelsaria (Strecker, 1899)-BC
- Stenoporpia polygrammaria (Packard, 1876)-QC, ON, MB, SK
- Stenoporpia pulmonaria (Grote, 1881)-AB, BC
- Stenoporpia separataria (Grote, 1883)-AB, BC

=== Tribe Caberini ===
- Apodrepanulatrix liberaria (Walker, 1860)-QC, ON
- Apodrepanulatrix litaria (Hulst, 1887)-AB, BC
- Cabera borealis (Hulst, 1896)-QC, MB, SK, AB, BC, YT, NT
- Cabera erythemaria Guenée, [1858]-NF, LB, NS, PE, NB, QC, ON, MB, SK, AB, BC
- Cabera exanthemata (Scopoli, 1763)-MB, SK, AB, BC, YT, NT
- Cabera variolaria Guenée, [1858]-NF, LB, NS, PE, NB, QC, ON, MB, SK, AB, BC, NT
- Drepanulatrix carnearia (Hulst, 1888)-BC
- Drepanulatrix falcataria (Packard, 1873)-AB, BC
- Drepanulatrix foeminaria (Guenée, [1858])-BC
- Drepanulatrix quadraria (Grote, 1882)-BC
- Drepanulatrix secundaria Barnes & McDunnough, 1916-BC
- Drepanulatrix unicalcararia (Guenée, [1858])-AB, BC
- Erastria coloraria (Fabricius, 1798)-ON
- Erastria cruentaria (Hübner, [1799])-ON, MB
- Eudrepanulatrix rectifascia (Hulst, 1896)-BC
- Ixala desperaria (Hulst, 1887)-BC
- Sericosema juturnaria (Guenée, [1858])-AB, BC
- Sericosema wilsonensis Cassino & Swett, 1922-BC

=== Tribe Campaeini ===
- Campaea perlata (Guenée, [1858])-NF, LB, NS, PE, NB, QC, ON, MB, SK, AB, BC, YT, NT

=== Tribe Ennomini ===
- Ennomos alniaria (Linnaeus, 1758)-BC
- Ennomos magnaria Guenée, [1858]-NS, PE, NB, QC, ON, MB, SK, AB, BC
- Ennomos subsignaria (Hübner, [1823])-NS, PE, NB, QC, ON, MB, SK, AB

=== Tribe Epirranthini ===
- Spodolepis substriataria Hulst, 1896-NS, PE, NB, QC, ON, MB, SK, AB, BC, YT

=== Tribe Lithinini ===
- Gueneria similaria (Walker, 1860)-NS, PE, NB, QC, ON
- Homochlodes disconventa (Walker, 1860)-NS, NB, QC, MB
- Homochlodes fritillaria (Guenée, [1858])-NF, LB, NS, PE, NB, QC, ON, MB, SK
- Homochlodes lactispargaria (Walker, 1861)-QC, ON
- Petrophora subaequaria (Walker, 1860)-NS, PE, NB, QC, ON, SK
- Philedia punctomacularia (Hulst, 1888)-BC
- Tacparia atropunctata (Packard, 1874)-NS, PE, NB, QC, ON
- Tacparia detersata (Guenée, [1858])-NS, PE, NB, QC, ON, MB, SK
- Thallophaga hyperborea (Hulst, 1900)-BC
- Thallophaga taylorata (Hulst, 1896)-BC

=== Tribe Melanolophiini ===
- Eufidonia convergaria (Walker, 1860)-NF, LB, NS, PE, NB, QC, ON, MB, SK, AB, BC
- Eufidonia discospilata (Walker, 1862)-NF, LB, NS, PE, NB, QC, ON, MB, SK, AB, BC
- Eufidonia notataria (Walker, 1860)-NS, PE, NB, QC, ON, MB, SK
- Melanolophia canadaria (Guenée, [1858])-NS, PE, NB, QC, ON, MB, SK
- Melanolophia imitata (Walker, 1860)-AB, BC
- Melanolophia signataria (Walker, 1860)-NS, PE, NB, QC, ON, MB, SK

=== Tribe Nacophorini ===
- Animomyia hardwicki Rindge, 1974-SK
- Gabriola dyari Taylor, 1904-BC
- Phaeoura mexicanaria (Grote, 1883)-ON, BC
- Phaeoura quernaria (Smith, 1797)-NS, PE, NB, QC, ON, MB, SK

=== Tribe Ourapterygini ===
- Antepione thisoaria (Guenée, [1858])-NS, PE, NB, QC, ON, MB
- Besma endropiaria (Grote & Robinson, 1867)-NS, PE, NB, QC, ON, MB, SK, AB
- Besma quercivoraria (Guenée, [1858])-NF, LB, NS, PE, NB, QC, ON, MB, SK, AB, BC
- Caripeta aequaliaria Grote, 1883-AB, BC
- Caripeta angustiorata Walker, [1863]-NF, LB, NS, PE, NB, QC, ON, MB, SK, AB, BC
- Caripeta divisata Walker, [1863]-NF, LB, NS, PE, NB, QC, ON, MB, SK, AB, BC
- Caripeta piniata (Packard, 1870)-NF, LB, NS, PE, NB, QC, ON, MB, SK
- Cingilia catenaria (Drury, 1773)-NS, PE, NB, QC, ON, MB, SK, AB
- Enypia griseata Grossbeck, 1908-AB, BC
- Enypia packardata Taylor, 1906-BC
- Enypia venata (Grote, 1883)-AB, BC
- Eugonobapta nivosaria (Guenée, [1858])-NB, QC, ON, MB
- Eusarca confusaria Hübner, [1813]-NS, PE, NB, QC, ON, MB, SK
- Eutrapela clemataria (Smith, 1797)-NS, PE, NB, QC, ON, MB, SK
- Lambdina fervidaria (Hübner, [1831])-NS, PE, NB, QC, ON, MB, SK
- Lambdina fiscellaria (Guenée, [1858])-NF, LB, NS, PE, NB, QC, ON, MB, SK, AB, BC
- Meris patula Rindge, 1981-AB
- Meris suffusaria McDunnough, 1940-BC
- Nematocampa resistaria (Herrich-Schäffer, [1856])-NS, PE, NB, QC, ON, MB, SK, AB, BC
- Neoterpes trianguliferata (Packard, 1871)-SK, AB, BC, YT
- Nepytia canosaria (Walker, [1863])-NF, LB, NS, PE, NB, QC, ON, MB, SK, AB
- Nepytia freemani Munroe, 1963-AB, BC
- Nepytia pellucidaria (Packard, 1873)-NS, NB, QC, ON
- Nepytia phantasmaria (Strecker, 1899)-BC
- Nepytia umbrosaria (Packard, 1873)-BC
- Patalene olyzonaria (Walker, 1860)-QC
- Plataea trilinearia (Packard, 1873)-SK, AB, BC
- Prochoerodes amplicineraria (Pearsall, 1906)-BC
- Prochoerodes forficaria (Guenée, [1858])-BC
- Prochoerodes lineola (Goeze, 1781)-NS, PE, NB, QC, ON, MB, SK, AB
- Sabulodes edwardsata (Hulst, 1886)-BC
- Sicya crocearia Packard, 1873
- Sicya macularia (Harris, 1850)-NS, PE, NB, QC, ON, MB, SK, AB, BC, YT, NT
- Synaxis cervinaria (Packard, 1871)-BC
- Synaxis formosa (Hulst, 1896)-AB, BC
- Synaxis jubararia (Hulst, 1886)-MB, SK, AB, BC
- Synaxis pallulata (Hulst, 1887)-AB, BC
- Tetracis cachexiata Guenée, [1858]-NS, PE, NB, QC, ON, MB, SK, AB, BC
- Tetracis crocallata Guenée, [1858]-NS, PE, NB, QC, ON, MB, SK, AB

=== Tribe Semiothisini ===
- Digrammia californiaria (Packard, 1871)-AB, BC
- Digrammia continuata (Walker, 1862)-NB, QC, ON, MB
- Digrammia curvata (Grote, 1880)-SK, AB, BC
- Digrammia decorata (Grossbeck, 1907)-MB, SK, AB, BC
- Digrammia delectata (Hulst, 1887)-SK, BC
- Digrammia denticulata (Grote, 1883)-ON, MB, SK, AB, BC, YT, NT
- Digrammia gnophosaria (Guenée, [1858])-NS, NB, QC, ON
- Digrammia irrorata (Packard, 1876)-BC
- Digrammia mellistrigata (Grote, 1873)-NS, NB, QC, ON, MB, SK, AB
- Digrammia muscariata (Guenée, [1858])-BC
- Digrammia neptaria (Guenée, [1858])-NF, NS, NB, QC, ON, SK, AB, BC, YT, NT
- Digrammia nubiculata (Packard, 1876)-BC
- Digrammia ocellinata (Guenée, [1858])-QC, ON
- Digrammia ordinata (Walker, 1862)-NB
- Digrammia respersata (Hulst, 1880)-BC
- Digrammia rippertaria (Duponchel, 1830)-LB, QC, ON, MB, SK, AB, BC, YT, NT
- Digrammia setonana (McDunnough, 1927)-SK, AB, BC
- Digrammia subminiata (Packard, 1873)-MB, SK, AB, BC
- Digrammia triviata (Barnes & McDunnough, 1917)-BC
- Eumacaria latiferrugata (Walker, [1863])-NS, QC, ON, MB, SK, AB, BC
- Isturgia dislocaria (Packard, 1876)-QC, ON
- Macaria abruptata (Walker, 1862)-QC, ON
- Macaria adonis Barnes & McDunnough, 1918-BC
- Macaria aemulataria Walker, 1861-NS, NB, QC, ON, MB, SK, AB
- Macaria anataria (Swett, 1913)-NF, LB, NS, NB, QC, ON, MB, SK, AB, BC, YT, NT
- Macaria andersoni (Swett, 1916)-NF, LB, NS, PE, NB, QC, ON, MB, SK, AB, BC, YT, NT
- Macaria argillacearia (Packard, 1874)-QC, ON
- Macaria atrimacularia Barnes & McDunnough, 1913-BC
- Macaria bicolorata (Fabricius, 1798)-NS, NB, QC, ON, MB, SK, AB, BC
- Macaria bisignata Walker, 1866-NF, NS, NB, QC, ON
- Macaria bitactata (Walker, 1862)-NF, LB, NS, NB, QC, ON, MB, SK, AB, BC, YT, NT
- Macaria brunneata (Thunberg, 1784)-NF, LB, NS, PE, NB, QC, ON, MB, SK, AB, BC, YT, NT
- Macaria colata (Grote, 1881)-BC
- Macaria coortaria (Hulst, 1887)-QC, ON, MB, SK
- Macaria decorata (Hulst, 1896)-AB, BC
- Macaria evagaria (Hulst, 1900)-QC, ON
- Macaria exauspicata Walker, 1861-NB, QC, ON, MB, SK, AB, BC
- Macaria fissinotata (Walker, [1863])-NS, NB, QC, ON
- Macaria flavicaria (Packard, 1876)-ON, AB
- Macaria granitata Guenée, [1858]-QC
- Macaria loricaria (Eversmann, 1837)-NF, NS, NB, QC, ON, MB, SK, AB, BC, YT, NT
- Macaria lorquinaria (Guenée, [1858])-BC
- Macaria marmorata (Ferguson, 1972)-NB, QC, ON, MB, SK, AB, BC
- Macaria minorata Packard, 1873-NS, PE, NB, QC, ON
- Macaria multilineata Packard, 1873-ON
- Macaria occiduaria (Packard, 1874)-ON, MB, SK, AB, BC
- Macaria oweni (Swett, 1907)-NF, NS, NB, QC, ON, MB, SK, AB
- Macaria perplexata (Pearsall, 1913)-BC
- Macaria pinistrobata (Ferguson, 1972)-NS, PE, NB, QC, ON
- Macaria plumosata (Barnes & McDunnough, 1917)-BC
- Macaria pustularia (Guenée, [1858])-NS, NB, QC, ON, SK
- Macaria quadrilinearia (Packard, 1873)-BC
- Macaria ribearia (Fitch, 1848)-QC, ON, MB, SK, AB
- Macaria sexmaculata Packard, 1867-NF, LB, NS, PE, NB, QC, ON, MB, SK, AB, BC, YT, NT, NU
- Macaria signaria (Hübner, [1809])-NF, LB, NS, PE, NB, QC, ON, MB, SK, AB, BC
- Macaria simplex (Dyar, 1907)-AB
- Macaria subcessaria (Walker, 1861)-NS, NB, QC, ON, MB
- Macaria submarmorata Walker, 1861-NS, NB, QC, ON, MB, SK, AB
- Macaria sulphurea (Packard, 1873)-NF, LB, NS, NB, QC, ON, MB, SK, AB, BC
- Macaria transitaria (Walker, 1861)-NS, NB, QC, ON
- Macaria truncataria (Walker, 1862)-NF, LB, NS, PE, NB, QC, ON, MB, SK, AB, BC, YT, NT
- Macaria ulsterata (Pearsall, 1913)-NS, NB, QC, ON, MB, SK, AB, BC, NT
- Macaria unipunctaria (Wright, 1916)-AB, BC
- Mellilla xanthometata (Walker, 1862)-ON
- Narraga fimetaria (Grote & Robinson, 1870)-SK, AB

== Subfamily Geometrinae ==
=== Tribe Hemitheini ===
- Chlorochlamys chloroleucaria (Guenée, [1858])-NS, PE, NB, QC, ON, MB
- Chlorochlamys triangularis Prout, 1912-BC
- Hemithea aestivaria (Hübner, [1799])-BC
- Hethemia pistasciaria (Guenée, [1858])-NS, PE, NB, QC, ON, MB
- Mesothea incertata (Walker, [1863])-NF, LB, NS, PE, NB, QC, ON, MB, SK, AB, BC, YT, NT

=== Tribe Nemoriini ===
- Chlorosea banksaria Sperry, 1944-BC
- Chlorosea nevadaria Packard, 1873-BC
- Dichorda iridaria (Guenée, [1858])-QC, ON
- Nemoria bistriaria Hübner, 1818-QC, ON
- Nemoria darwiniata (Dyar, 1904)-AB, BC
- Nemoria glaucomarginaria (Barnes & McDunnough, 1917)-BC
- Nemoria mimosaria (Guenée, [1858])-NS, PE, NB, QC, ON, MB, SK, AB
- Nemoria rubrifrontaria (Packard, 1873)-NS, PE, NB, QC, ON
- Nemoria unitaria (Packard, 1873)-MB, SK, AB, BC

=== Tribe Synchlorini ===
- Synchlora aerata (Fabricius, 1798)-NF, LB, NS, PE, NB, QC, ON, MB, SK, AB, BC
- Synchlora bistriaria (Packard, 1876)-SK, AB, BC

== Subfamily Larentiinae ==
=== Tribe Asthenini ===
- Hydrelia albifera (Walker, 1866)-NF, NS, NB, QC, ON, MB, SK, AB, BC
- Hydrelia brunneifasciata (Packard, 1876)-BC
- Hydrelia condensata (Walker, 1862)-NB, QC, ON, MB
- Hydrelia inornata (Hulst, 1896)-NS, NB, QC
- Hydrelia lucata (Guenée, [1858])-NF, NS, NB, QC, ON, MB
- Trichodezia albovittata (Guenée, [1858])-NF, LB, NS, PE, NB, QC, ON, MB, SK, AB, BC, YT, NT
- Venusia cambrica Curtis, 1839-NF, LB, NS, NB, QC, ON, MB, SK, AB, BC
- Venusia comptaria (Walker, 1860)-NF, NS, NB, QC, ON, MB
- Venusia duodecemlineata (Packard, 1873)-BC
- Venusia obsoleta (Swett, 1916)-BC
- Venusia pearsalli (Dyar, 1906)-AB, BC

=== Tribe Eudulini ===
- Eubaphe mendica (Walker, 1854)-NS, NB, QC, ON, MB, SK, AB, BC
- Eubaphe unicolor (Robinson, 1869)-BC

=== Tribe Eupitheciini ===
- Eupithecia absinthiata (Clerck, 1759)-NF, NS, NB, QC, ON, SK, AB, BC, YT
- Eupithecia affinata Pearsall, 1908-QC, ON
- Eupithecia agnesata Taylor, 1908-BC
- Eupithecia albicapitata Packard, 1876-NF, NS, PE, NB, QC, ON, MB, AB, BC, YT
- Eupithecia ammonata McDunnough, 1929-MB, SK, AB
- Eupithecia annulata (Hulst, 1896)-NF, NS, NB, QC, ON, MB, SK, AB, BC, YT, NT
- Eupithecia anticaria Walker, 1862-NF, NS, PE, NB, QC, ON, MB, SK, AB, BC
- Eupithecia assimilata Doubleday, 1856-NF, NB, QC, ON, MB, SK, AB, BC
- Eupithecia behrensata Packard, 1876-SK, BC
- Eupithecia borealis (Hulst, 1898)-QC, MB, SK, AB, BC
- Eupithecia bowmani Cassino & Swett, 1923-ON, AB
- Eupithecia bryanti Taylor, 1906-AB, BC, YT
- Eupithecia casloata (Dyar, 1904)-NF, NS, NB, QC, ON, AB, BC
- Eupithecia cimicifugata Pearsall, 1908-NF, QC, ON, MB, SK, AB
- Eupithecia coloradensis (Hulst, 1896)-QC, ON
- Eupithecia columbiata (Dyar, 1904)-NF, NB, QC, ON, MB, SK, AB, BC
- Eupithecia cretaceata (Packard, 1874)-NB, QC, ON, MB, SK, AB, BC, YT
- Eupithecia fletcherata Taylor, 1907-NF, NS, NB, QC, ON, MB
- Eupithecia gelidata Möschler, 1860-NF, NS, NB, QC, ON, MB, SK, AB, BC, YT
- Eupithecia gilvipennata Cassino & Swett, 1922-BC
- Eupithecia graefii (Hulst, 1896)-BC
- Eupithecia harrisonata MacKay, 1951-BC
- Eupithecia indistincta Taylor, 1910-NB, QC
- Eupithecia interruptofasciata Packard, 1873-NF, NS, NB, QC, ON, MB, AB, BC, YT
- Eupithecia intricata (Zetterstedt, [1839])-NF, NB, QC, ON, MB, AB, BC, YT, NT
- Eupithecia johnstoni McDunnough, 1946-ON
- Eupithecia lachrymosa (Hulst, 1900)-SK, AB, BC
- Eupithecia lafontaineata Bolte, 1990-AB, BC
- Eupithecia lariciata (Freyer, 1841)-NF, NS, PE, NB, QC, ON, MB, SK, AB, BC, YT, NT
- Eupithecia longipalpata Packard, 1876-BC
- Eupithecia maestosa (Hulst, 1896)-AB, BC
- Eupithecia miserulata Grote, 1863-NS, NB, QC, ON
- Eupithecia misturata (Hulst, 1896)-NF, NS, NB, QC, ON, MB, SK, AB, BC, YT
- Eupithecia multistrigata (Hulst, 1896)-SK, AB, BC
- Eupithecia mutata Pearsall, 1908-NF, NS, PE, NB, QC, ON, SK, AB, BC
- Eupithecia nevadata Packard, 1871-BC
- Eupithecia nimbicolor (Hulst, 1896)-NF, NS, QC, ON, MB, SK, AB, BC
- Eupithecia niphadophilata (Dyar, 1904)-AB, BC
- Eupithecia niveifascia (Hulst, 1898)-BC
- Eupithecia olivacea Taylor, 1906-BC
- Eupithecia ornata (Hulst, 1896)-MB, SK, AB, BC
- Eupithecia palpata Packard, 1873-NF, NS, PE, NB, QC, ON, MB, SK, AB, BC
- Eupithecia perfusca (Hulst, 1898)-NF, NS, NB, QC, ON, MB, SK, AB, BC, YT
- Eupithecia placidata Taylor, 1908-AB, BC
- Eupithecia pseudotsugata MacKay, 1951-AB, BC
- Eupithecia pygmaeata (Hübner, [1799])-SK
- Eupithecia ravocostaliata Packard, 1876-NS, NB, QC, ON, MB, SK, AB, BC
- Eupithecia regina Taylor, 1906-MB, SK, AB, BC
- Eupithecia rotundopuncta Packard, 1871-BC
- Eupithecia russeliata Swett, 1908-NF, NS, NB, QC, ON, MB, SK
- Eupithecia satyrata (Hübner, [1813])-NF, NS, PE, NB, QC, ON, MB, SK, AB, BC, YT, NT
- Eupithecia sharronata Bolte, 1990-NF, QC, AB, BC, YT
- Eupithecia sheppardata McDunnough, 1938-QC, ON, AB
- Eupithecia spermaphaga (Dyar, 1917)-BC
- Eupithecia stellata (Hulst, 1896)-MB, SK, AB
- Eupithecia strattonata Packard, 1873-NF, NB, QC, ON
- Eupithecia subfuscata (Haworth, 1809)-NF, NS, NB, QC, ON, MB, SK, AB, BC
- Eupithecia swettii Grossbeck, 1907-QC, ON
- Eupithecia tenuata Hulst, 1880-BC
- Eupithecia tripunctaria Herrich-Schäffer, 1852-NF, NS, NB, QC, ON, SK, AB, BC
- Eupithecia unicolor (Hulst, 1896)-BC
- Eupithecia zygadeniata Packard, 1876-YT
- Horisme incana Swett, 1918-MB, SK, AB, BC
- Horisme intestinata (Guenée, [1858])-NF, NS, NB, QC, ON, MB, SK, AB, BC
- Pasiphila rectangulata (Linnaeus, 1758)-NF, NS, NB, QC, BC
- Prorella leucata (Hulst, 1896)-BC
- Prorella mellisa (Grossbeck, 1908)-BC

=== Tribe Hydriomenini ===
- Anticlea multiferata (Walker, 1863)-NF, LB, NS, NB, QC, ON, MB, SK, AB, BC, YT, NT
- Anticlea vasiliata Guenée, [1858]-NF, NS, NB, QC, ON, MB, SK, AB, BC
- Ceratodalia gueneata Packard, 1876-AB, BC
- Colostygia turbata Hübner, [1799]-AB, BC
- Coryphista meadii (Packard, 1874)-NS, QC, ON, SK, AB, BC
- Dysstroma brunneata (Packard, 1867)-NF, NB, QC, SK, AB, BC
- Dysstroma citrata (Linnaeus, 1761)-NF, LB, NS, PE, NB, QC, ON, MB, SK, AB, BC, YT, NT
- Dysstroma colvillei Blackmore, 1926-BC
- Dysstroma formosa (Hulst, 1896)-NF, NB, SK, AB, BC, YT
- Dysstroma hersiliata (Guenée, [1858])-NF, LB, NS, PE, NB, QC, ON, MB, SK, AB, BC
- Dysstroma mancipata (Guenée, [1858])-BC
- Dysstroma ochrofuscaria Ferguson, 1983-BC
- Dysstroma rutlandia McDunnough, 1943-SK, AB
- Dysstroma sobria Swett, 1917-BC
- Dysstroma suspectata (Möschler 1874)-NF, QC, AB, YT, NT
- Dysstroma truncata (Hufnagel, 1767)-NS, PE, NB, QC, ON, MB, SK, AB, BC
- Dysstroma walkerata (Pearsall, 1909)-NF, LB, NS, PE, NB, QC, ON, MB, SK, AB, BC, YT
- Ecliptopera silaceata ([Denis & Schiffermüller], 1775)-NF, LB, NS, PE, NB, QC, ON, MB, SK, AB, BC, YT
- Entephria aurata (Packard, 1867)-NF, LB, QC
- Entephria beringiana Troubridge, 1997-YT
- Entephria bradorata (Munroe, 1951)-NF, LB, QC, ON, MB, NU
- Entephria kidluitata (Munroe, 1951)-AB, BC, YT, NT
- Entephria lagganata (Taylor, 1908)-AB, BC, YT
- Entephria lynda Troubridge, 1997-YT
- Entephria multivagata (Hulst, 1881)-SK, AB, BC, YT, NT
- Entephria polata (Duponchel, 1830)-MB, NT, NU
- Entephria punctipes (Curtis, 1835)-NT, NU
- Entephria separata Troubridge, 1997-NF, LB, NS, QC, ON
- Entephria takuata (Taylor, 1908)-BC
- Eulithis destinata (Möschler, 1860)-NF, LB, NB, QC, ON, MB, SK, AB, BC, YT
- Eulithis diversilineata (Hübner, [1813])-NB, QC, ON
- Eulithis explanata (Walker, 1862)-NF, LB, NS, PE, NB, QC, ON, MB, SK, AB
- Eulithis flavibrunneata (McDunnough, 1943)-NB, QC, ON, MB, SK, AB, BC, YT
- Eulithis gracilineata (Guenée, [1858])-NS, PE, NB, QC, ON, MB, SK, AB
- Eulithis mellinata (Fabricius, 1787)-QC
- Eulithis molliculata (Walker, 1862)-QC, ON
- Eulithis propulsata (Walker, 1862)-NF, LB, NS, PE, NB, QC, ON, MB, SK, AB, BC, YT, NT
- Eulithis prunata (Linnaeus, 1758)-QC
- Eulithis serrataria (Barnes & McDunnough, 1917)-NF, NS, NB, QC, ON, MB
- Eulithis testata (Linnaeus, 1761)-NF, NB, QC, ON, MB, SK, AB, BC, YT, NT
- Eulithis xylina (Hulst, 1896)-SK, AB, BC, YT
- Eurhinosea flavaria Packard, 1873-BC
- Eustroma atrifasciata (Hulst, 1888)-AB, BC, YT
- Eustroma fasciata Barnes & McDunnough, 1918-BC
- Eustroma semiatrata (Hulst, 1881)-NF, NS, NB, QC, ON, MB, SK, AB, BC, YT
- Hydriomena albifasciata (Packard, 1874)-BC
- Hydriomena albimontanata McDunnough, 1939-AB, BC
- Hydriomena californiata Packard, 1871-BC
- Hydriomena crokeri Swett, 1910-BC
- Hydriomena divisaria (Walker, 1860)-NF, NS, NB, QC, ON, MB, SK, AB, BC
- Hydriomena edenata Swett, 1909-BC
- Hydriomena exculpata Barnes & McDunnough, 1917-NF, LB, NB, QC, BC
- Hydriomena expurgata Barnes & McDunnough, 1918-BC
- Hydriomena furcata (Thunberg, 1784)-NF, LB, NS, NB, QC, ON, MB, SK, AB, BC, YT, NT
- Hydriomena irata Swett, 1910-BC
- Hydriomena macdunnoughi Swett, 1918-AB, BC, YT
- Hydriomena manzanita Taylor, 1906-BC
- Hydriomena marinata Barnes & McDunnough, 1917-BC
- Hydriomena morosata Barnes & McDunnough, 1917-AB
- Hydriomena nevadae Barnes & McDunnough, 1917-BC
- Hydriomena nubilofasciata (Packard, 1871)-BC
- Hydriomena perfracta Swett, 1910-NF, NS, NB, QC, ON, MB, SK, AB, BC
- Hydriomena pluviata (Guenée, [1858])-QC
- Hydriomena quinquefasciata (Packard, 1871)-BC
- Hydriomena renunciata (Walker, 1862)-NF, LB, NS, NB, QC, ON, MB, SK, AB, BC, YT, NT, NU
- Hydriomena ruberata (Freyer, [1831])-NS, NB, QC, ON, MB, SK, AB, BC, YT
- Hydriomena speciosata (Packard, 1874)-BC
- Hydriomena transfigurata Swett, 1912-NS, QC, ON, MB
- Mesoleuca gratulata (Walker, 1862)-AB, BC
- Mesoleuca ruficillata (Guenée, [1858])-NF, LB, NS, NB, QC, ON, MB, SK, AB, BC
- Perizoma alchemillata (Linnaeus, 1758)-NF, NS, NB, QC
- Perizoma basaliata (Walker, 1862)-NF, LB, NS, NB, QC, ON, MB, SK, AB, BC
- Perizoma costiguttata (Hulst, 1896)-BC
- Perizoma curvilinea (Hulst, 1896)-BC
- Perizoma custodiata (Guenée, [1858])-SK, AB, BC
- Perizoma grandis (Hulst, 1896)-BC
- Plemyria georgii Hulst, 1896-NS, NB, QC, ON, MB, SK, AB, BC, YT, NT
- Rheumaptera hastata (Linnaeus, 1758)-NF, LB, NS, NB, QC, ON, MB, SK, AB, BC, YT, NT, NU
- Rheumaptera prunivorata (Ferguson, 1955)-NB, QC, ON
- Rheumaptera subhastata (Nolcken, 1870)-NF, LB, NS, PE, NB, QC, ON, MB, SK, AB, BC, YT, NT
- Rheumaptera undulata (Linnaeus, 1758)-NF, LB, NS, NB, QC, ON, MB, SK, AB, BC
- Spargania luctuata ([Denis & Schiffermüller], 1775)-NF, LB, NS, NB, QC, ON, MB, SK, AB, BC, NT
- Spargania magnoliata Guenée, [1858]-NF, NS, NB, QC, ON, MB, SK, AB, BC, YT, NT
- Thera contractata (Packard, 1873)-NF, NS, NB, QC, ON, MB
- Thera juniperata (Linnaeus, 1758)-NS, NB, QC, ON, SK, AB
- Thera otisi (Dyar, 1904)-AB, BC, YT
- Triphosa haesitata (Guenée, [1858])-NB, QC, ON, MB, SK, AB, BC

=== Tribe Lobophorini ===
- Acasis viridata (Packard, 1873)-NF, LB, NS, NB, QC, ON, MB, AB, BC
- Aplocera plagiata (Linnaeus, 1758)-QC, ON, BC
- Carsia sororiata (Hübner, [1813])-NF, LB, NS, PE, NB, QC, ON, MB, SK, AB, BC, YT, NT
- Cladara anguilineata (Grote & Robinson, 1867)-QC
- Cladara atroliturata (Walker, [1863])-NF, NS, NB, QC, ON, MB, SK, AB, BC
- Cladara limitaria (Walker, 1860)-NF, LB, NS, PE, NB, QC, ON, MB, SK, AB, BC
- Dyspteris abortivaria (Herrich-Schäffer, [1855])-QC, ON, MB
- Heterophleps refusaria (Walker, 1861)-QC, ON, MB, SK
- Heterophleps triguttaria Herrich-Schäffer, [1854]-QC, ON
- Lobophora canavestita (Pearsall, 1906)-BC
- Lobophora magnoliatoidata (Dyar, 1904)-AB, BC, YT, NT
- Lobophora montanata Packard, 1874-BC
- Lobophora nivigerata Walker, 1862-NF, LB, NS, PE, NB, QC, ON, MB, SK, AB, BC, NT
- Lobophora simsata Swett, 1920-BC

=== Tribe Operophterini ===
- Epirrita autumnata (Borkhausen, 1794)-NF, LB, NS, PE, NB, QC, ON, AB, BC
- Epirrita pulchraria (Taylor, 1907)-BC
- Epirrita undulata (Harrison, 1942)-AB, YT, NT
- Operophtera bruceata (Hulst, 1886)-NS, NB, QC, ON, MB, SK, AB, BC
- Operophtera brumata (Linnaeus, 1758)-NS, NB, BC
- Operophtera danbyi (Hulst, 1896)-BC

=== Tribe Stamnodini ===
- Stamnoctenis morrisata (Hulst, 1887)-BC
- Stamnoctenis pearsalli (Swett, 1914)-BC
- Stamnodes blackmorei Swett, 1915-BC
- Stamnodes gibbicostata (Walker, 1862)-QC, ON
- Stamnodes marmorata (Packard, 1871)-BC
- Stamnodes topazata (Strecker, 1899)-ON, MB, SK, AB, BC, YT, NT

=== Tribe Xanthorhoini ===
- Costaconvexa centrostrigaria (Wollaston, 1858)-NS, NB, QC, ON, MB, SK, BC
- Disclisioprocta stellata (Guenée, [1858])-NB, QC, ON
- Enchoria lacteata (Packard, 1876)-BC
- Epirrhoe alternata (Müller, 1764)-NF, LB, NS, NB, QC, ON, MB, SK, AB, BC, YT, NT
- Epirrhoe plebeculata (Guenée, [1858])-SK, AB, BC
- Epirrhoe sperryi Herbulot, 1951-NF, QC, MB, SK, AB, BC, YT, NT
- Euphyia intermediata (Guenée, [1858])-NF, LB, NS, NB, QC, ON, MB, SK, AB, BC, NT
- Orthonama evansi (McDunnough, 1920)-NF, QC, ON, AB
- Orthonama obstipata (Fabricius, 1794)-NS, PE, NB, QC, ON, MB, SK, AB
- Psychophora phocata (Möschler, 1862)-QC, BC, YT, NU
- Psychophora sabini Kirby, 1824-NT, NU
- Psychophora suttoni Heinrich, 1942-QC, AB, YT, NU
- Xanthorhoe abrasaria (Herrich-Schäffer, [1855])-NF, LB, NS, NB, QC, ON, MB, AB, BC
- Xanthorhoe algidata (Möschler 1874)-NF, LB, QC, ON, MB, SK, AB
- Xanthorhoe alticolata Barnes & McDunnough, 1916-AB, BC, YT
- Xanthorhoe baffinensis McDunnough, 1939-QC, BC, YT, NT, NU
- Xanthorhoe borealis Hulst, 1896-BC
- Xanthorhoe clarkeata Ferguson, 1987-BC
- Xanthorhoe decoloraria (Esper, [1806])-NF, LB, NS, NB, QC, ON, MB, SK, AB, BC, YT, NT
- Xanthorhoe defensaria (Guenée, [1858])-BC
- Xanthorhoe dodata Swett & Cassino, 1920-AB, BC
- Xanthorhoe ferrugata (Clerck, 1759)-NF, LB, NS, NB, QC, ON, MB, SK, AB, BC, YT, NT
- Xanthorhoe fossaria Taylor, 1906-AB, BC, YT
- Xanthorhoe iduata (Guenée, [1858])-NF, LB, NS, NB, QC, ON, MB, SK, AB, BC
- Xanthorhoe incursata (Hübner, [1813])-AB, BC, YT, NT
- Xanthorhoe labradorensis (Packard, 1867)-NF, LB, NS, NB, QC, ON, MB, SK, AB, BC, YT, NT
- Xanthorhoe lacustrata (Guenée, [1858])-LB, NS, NB, QC, ON, MB, SK, AB, BC
- Xanthorhoe macdunnoughi Swett, 1918-BC
- Xanthorhoe packardata McDunnough, 1945-QC, ON, MB, AB, BC
- Xanthorhoe pontiaria Taylor, 1906-SK, BC
- Xanthorhoe ramaria Swett & Cassino, 1920-LB, QC, SK, AB, BC, YT, NT
- Xanthorhoe reclivisata Swett & Cassino, 1920-AB
- Zenophleps alpinata Cassino, 1927-MB, SK, AB, BC, YT, NT
- Zenophleps lignicolorata (Packard, 1874)-MB, SK, AB, BC

== Subfamily Sterrhinae ==
=== Tribe Cosymbiini ===
- Cyclophora dataria (Hulst, 1887)-BC
- Cyclophora pendulinaria (Guenée, [1858])-NF, LB, NS, PE, NB, QC, ON, MB, SK, AB, BC, YT, NT
- Pleuroprucha insulsaria (Guenée, [1858])-NS, PE, NB, QC, ON

=== Tribe Scopulini ===
- Leptostales ferruminaria (Zeller, 1872)-QC, ON, MB, SK, AB
- Leptostales rubromarginaria (Packard, 1871)-BC
- Scopula ancellata (Hulst, 1887)-QC, MB, SK, AB, BC, NT
- Scopula cacuminaria (Morrison, 1874)-NS, PE, NB, QC, ON, MB, SK
- Scopula frigidaria (Möschler, 1860)-NF, LB, NS, PE, NB, QC, ON, MB, SK, AB, BC, YT, NT, NU
- Scopula fuscata (Hulst, 1887)-SK, AB, BC
- Scopula inductata (Guenée, [1858])-NF, LB, NS, PE, NB, QC, ON, MB, SK, AB
- Scopula junctaria (Walker, 1861)-NF, LB, NS, PE, NB, QC, ON, MB, SK, AB, BC, NT
- Scopula limboundata (Haworth, 1809)-NS, PE, NB, QC, ON, MB, SK, AB
- Scopula luteolata (Hulst, 1880)-AB, BC
- Scopula purata (Guenée, [1858])-ON
- Scopula quadrilineata (Packard, 1876)-NS, NB, QC, ON, MB, SK, BC
- Scopula sentinaria (Geyer, 1837)-NF, LB, NS, PE, NB, QC, ON, MB, SK, AB, BC, YT, NT, NU
- Scopula septentrionicola McDunnough, 1939-BC, YT, NT, NU
- Scopula siccata McDunnough, 1939-BC
- Scopula sideraria (Guenée, [1858])-BC

=== Tribe Sterrhini ===
- Idaea demissaria (Hübner, [1831])-QC, ON, BC
- Idaea dimidiata (Hufnagel, 1767)-NB, QC, ON, BC
- Idaea rotundopennata (Packard, 1876)-NS, PE, NB, QC, ON, MB, SK, AB, BC, YT, NT
- Idaea violacearia (Walker, 1861)-ON
- Lobocleta quaesitata (Hulst, 1880)-BC

=== Tribe Timandrini ===
- Haematopis grataria (Fabricius, 1798)-QC, ON, MB, SK, AB, NT
