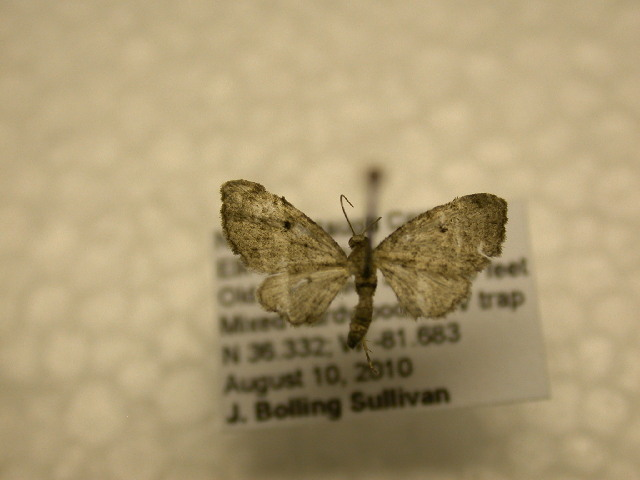

Scientific classification
- Domain: Eukaryota
- Kingdom: Animalia
- Phylum: Arthropoda
- Class: Insecta
- Order: Lepidoptera
- Family: Geometridae
- Genus: Eupithecia
- Species: E. affinata

Binomial name
- Eupithecia affinata Pearsall, 1908

= Eupithecia affinata =

Species of moth

Eupithecia affinata is a moth in the family Geometridae first described by Pearsall in 1908. It is found in North America, including Pennsylvania, New Jersey, New York, Maryland, Maine, Michigan, North Carolina, West Virginia, Kentucky, Ontario and Quebec. It has also been recorded from Arizona and California.
