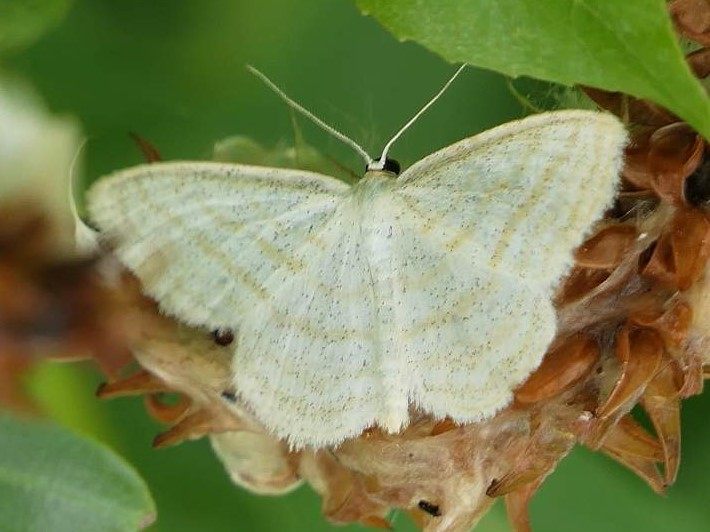

Scientific classification
- Kingdom: Animalia
- Phylum: Arthropoda
- Clade: Pancrustacea
- Class: Insecta
- Order: Lepidoptera
- Family: Geometridae
- Genus: Scopula
- Species: S. quadrilineata

Binomial name
- Scopula quadrilineata (Packard, 1876)

Synonyms
- Acidalia quadrilineata Packard, 1876; Eois persimilis Hulst, 1898

= Scopula quadrilineata =

Four-lined wave

Species of geometer moth in subfamily Sterrhinae

Scopula quadrilineata, commonly known as the four-lined wave, is a species of moth in the family Geometridae. It is found in North America, from Nova Scotia to Saskatchewan and bordering areas of the United States, south in the east to North Carolina. It has also been recorded in British Columbia.

The wingspan is 20–22 mm.
