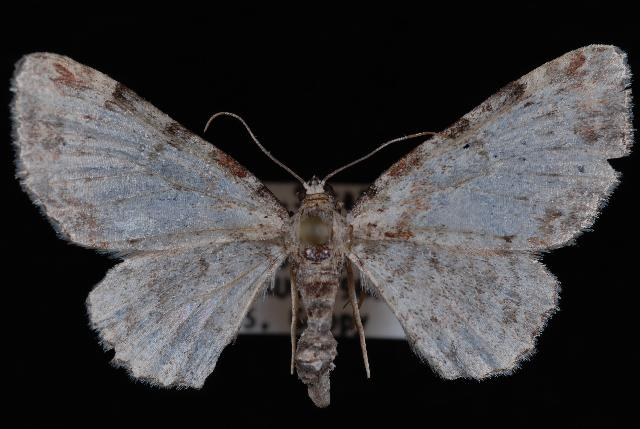

Scientific classification
- Domain: Eukaryota
- Kingdom: Animalia
- Phylum: Arthropoda
- Class: Insecta
- Order: Lepidoptera
- Family: Geometridae
- Genus: Eupithecia
- Species: E. mutata

Binomial name
- Eupithecia mutata Pearsall, 1908

Synonyms
- Eupithecia columbrata McDunnough, 1940

= Eupithecia mutata =

Species of moth

Eupithecia mutata, the spruce cone looper or cloaked pug, is a moth in the family Geometridae. The species was first described by Pearsall in 1908. It is found in the northern Atlantic and New England states in North America. In Canada, the range extends from Nova Scotia to northern Ontario.

The wingspan is 17–22 mm.

The larvae feed on seeds within the cones of spruce species.
