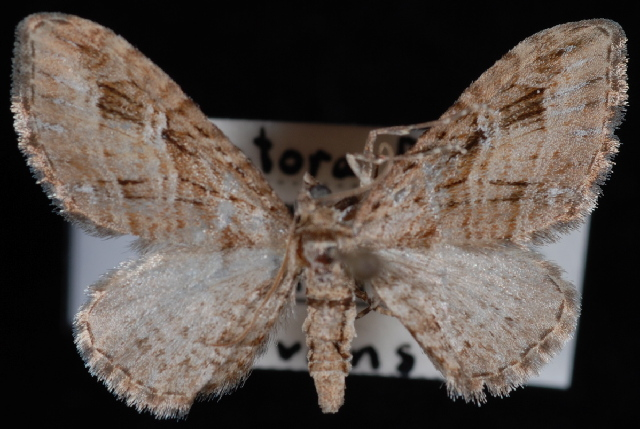

Scientific classification
- Kingdom: Animalia
- Phylum: Arthropoda
- Class: Insecta
- Order: Lepidoptera
- Family: Geometridae
- Genus: Eupithecia
- Species: E. niphadophilata

Binomial name
- Eupithecia niphadophilata (Dyar, 1904)

Synonyms
- Tephroclystia niphadophilata Dyar, 1904

= Eupithecia niphadophilata =

Species of moth

Eupithecia niphadophilata is a moth in the family Geometridae first described by Harrison Gray Dyar Jr. in 1904. It is found in North America from British Columbia and western Alberta south to New Mexico.

The wingspan is about 20 mm. Adults are on wing from late July to September.

The larvae feed on Juniperus communis, Juniperus scopulorum and Thuja plicata. Full-grown larvae reach a length of 20 mm. Larvae can be found from mid-May to early August and pupation takes place from July to August. The species overwinters as an egg.
