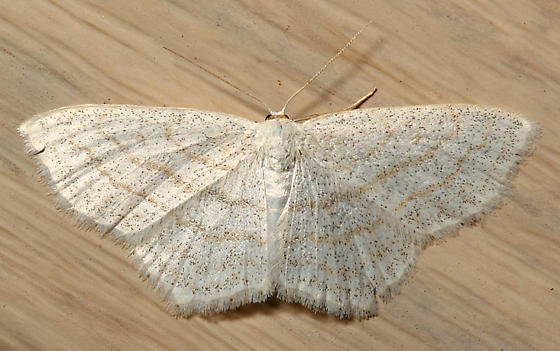

Scientific classification
- Domain: Eukaryota
- Kingdom: Animalia
- Phylum: Arthropoda
- Class: Insecta
- Order: Lepidoptera
- Family: Geometridae
- Genus: Scopula
- Species: S. junctaria

Binomial name
- Scopula junctaria (Walker, 1861)

Synonyms
- Acidalia junctaria Walker, 1862; Synelys impunctata Warren, 1904; Synelys vestalialis Barnes & McDunnough, 1913; Scopula quinquelinearia (Packard, 1871); Scopula impunctata (Warren, 1904); Scopula vestalialis (Barnes & McDunnough, 1913); Scopula johnsonaria McDunnough, 1941

= Scopula junctaria =

Species of geometer moth in subfamily Sterrhinae

Scopula junctaria, the simple wave, is a moth of the family Geometridae. The species was first described by Francis Walker in 1861. It is found in the whole of Canada and the northern United States, south to Maryland, Arizona, and California.

The wingspan is 20–26 millimetres (0.79–1.02 in). Adults are on wing from late May to August. There is one generation per year.

The larvae feed on various plants, including chickweed, clover and elm.

== Subspecies ==
- Scopula junctaria junctaria
- Scopula junctaria quinquelinearia (Packard, 1871)
- Scopula junctaria johnstonaria McDunnough, 1941
