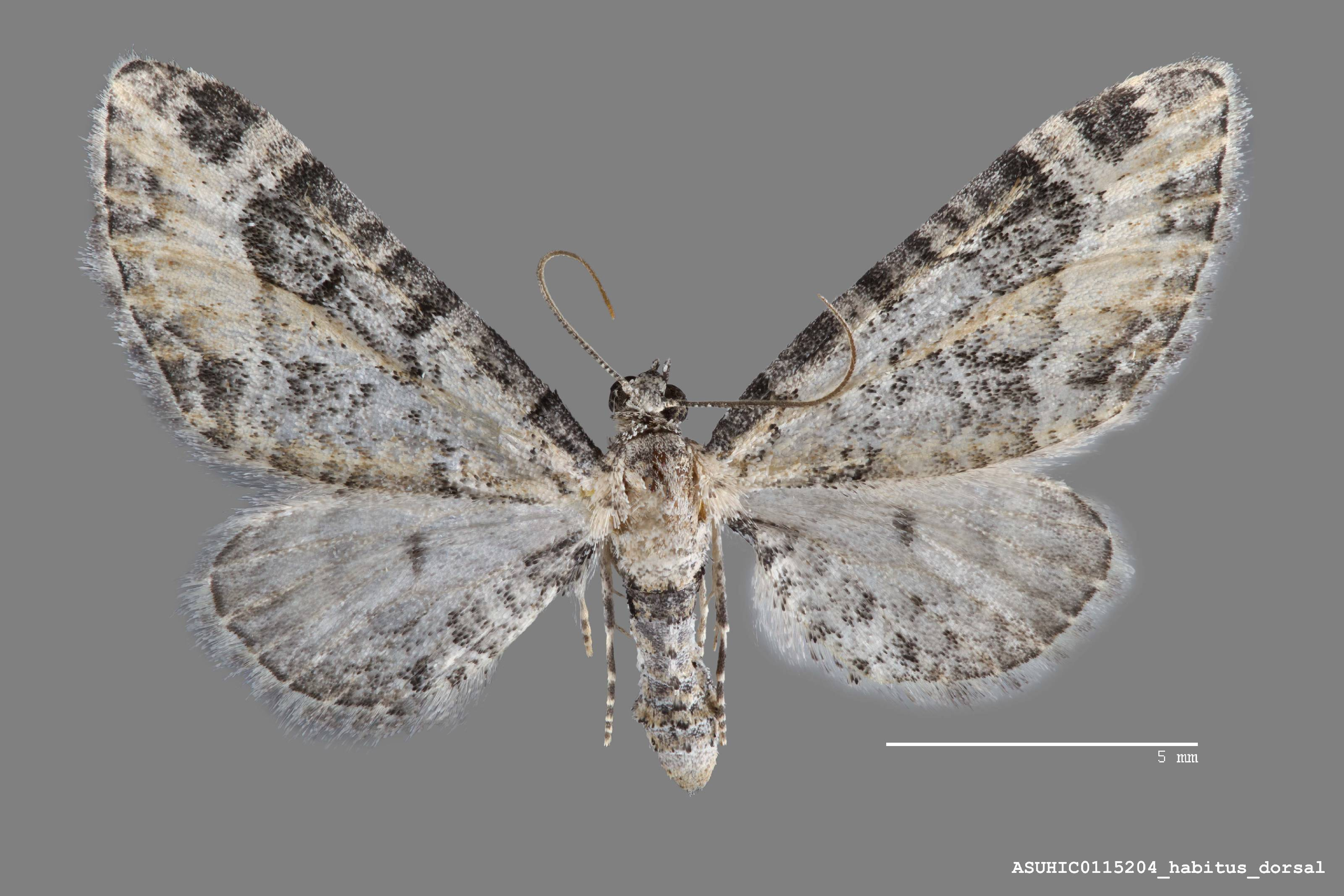

Scientific classification
- Domain: Eukaryota
- Kingdom: Animalia
- Phylum: Arthropoda
- Class: Insecta
- Order: Lepidoptera
- Family: Geometridae
- Genus: Eupithecia
- Species: E. agnesata

Binomial name
- Eupithecia agnesata Taylor, 1908

Synonyms
- Eupithecia barnesi Cassino, 1922

= Eupithecia agnesata =

Species of moth

Eupithecia agnesata is a moth in the family Geometridae first described by Taylor in 1908. It is found in North America from California through Wyoming, Oregon and Washington to British Columbia.

The wingspan is about 18 mm. The forewing ground colour is grey mixed with dark scales and black transverse lines with brown shading in the discal area. Adults are on wing from April to September.
