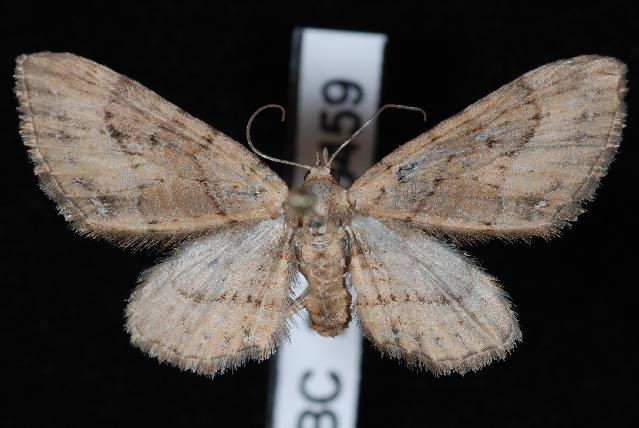

Scientific classification
- Domain: Eukaryota
- Kingdom: Animalia
- Phylum: Arthropoda
- Class: Insecta
- Order: Lepidoptera
- Family: Geometridae
- Genus: Eupithecia
- Species: E. unicolor

Binomial name
- Eupithecia unicolor (Hulst, 1896)

Synonyms
- Tephroclystia unicolor Hulst, 1896; Eupithecia cenataria Cassino & Swett, 1922

= Eupithecia unicolor =

Species of moth

Eupithecia unicolor is a moth in the family Geometridae. It is found from British Columbia south to California.

The wingspan is about 21 mm. Adults have been recorded on wing from May to November.

The larvae feed on Juniperus scopulorum, Thuja plicata and Chamaecyparis nootkatensis. Full-grown larvae reach a length of about 20 mm. Larvae can be found from April to May and pupation occurs in June. The species overwinters as a mid-instar larva.
