= Eupithecia casloata =

Scientific classification
- Kingdom: Animalia
- Phylum: Arthropoda
- Class: Insecta
- Order: Lepidoptera
- Family: Geometridae
- Genus: Eupithecia
- Species: E. casloata

Binomial name
- Eupithecia casloata (Dyar, 1904)

Synonyms
- Tephroclystia casloata Dyar, 1904; Eupithecia bradorata McDunnough, 1930; Eupithecia kasloata McDunnough, 1929

Species of moth

Eupithecia casloata is a moth in the family Geometridae first described by Harrison Gray Dyar Jr. in 1904. It is found in North America, including Yukon, British Columbia, Alberta, Saskatchewan, New Brunswick, Newfoundland and Labrador, Quebec, Washington, Montana, Oregon, Wyoming, Colorado, Utah, California, Maine and New Hampshire.

The wingspan is about 16 mm.
