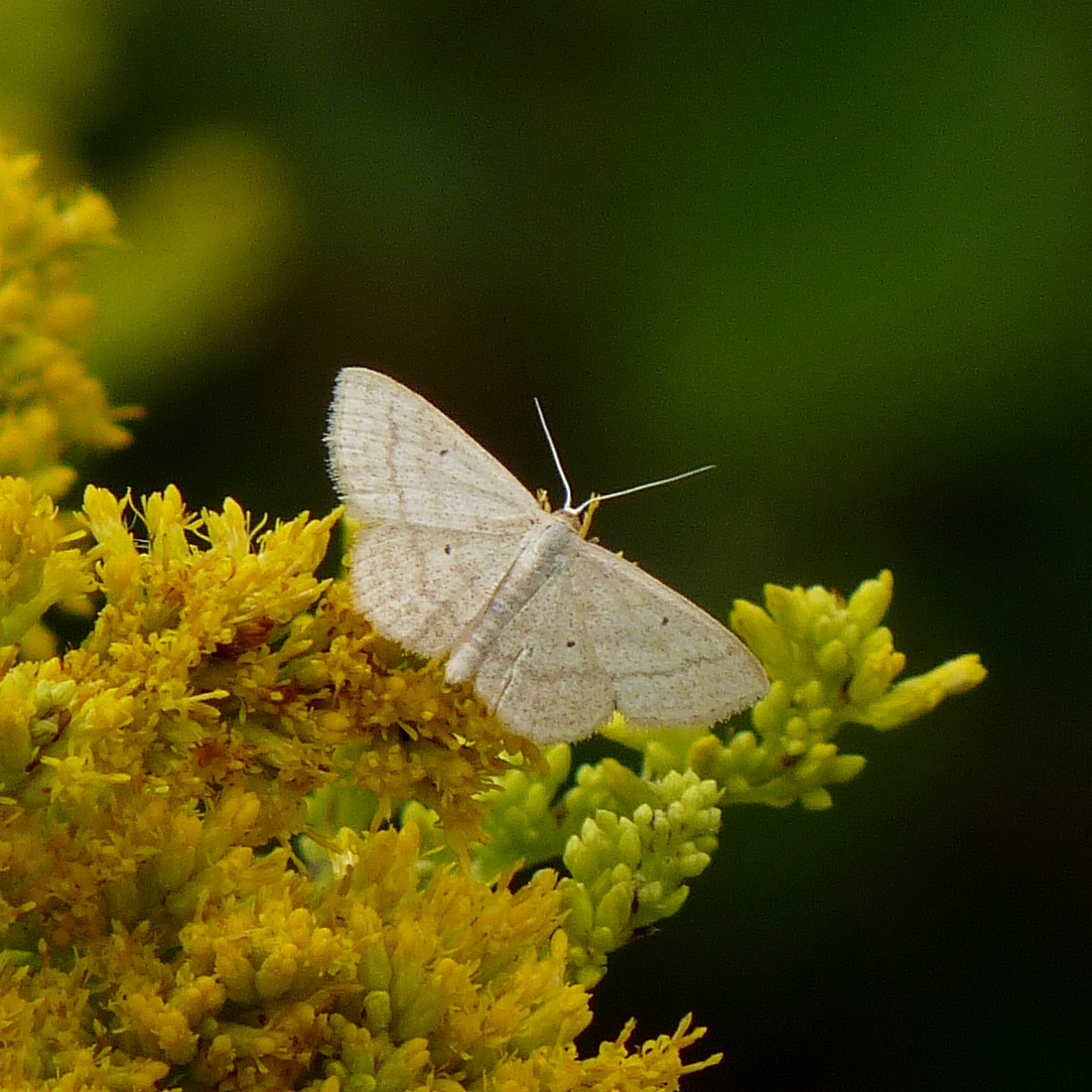

Scientific classification
- Kingdom: Animalia
- Phylum: Arthropoda
- Clade: Pancrustacea
- Class: Insecta
- Order: Lepidoptera
- Family: Geometridae
- Genus: Scopula
- Species: S. inductata

Binomial name
- Scopula inductata (Guenée, 1857)

Synonyms
- Acidalia inductata Guenée, 1857; Scopula anticaria (Walker, 1860); Scopula suppressaria (Walker, 1862); Scopula consecutaria (Walker, 1866); Scopula sobria (Walker, 1866); Scopula delicata (Cassino, 1931); Scopula oliveata (Cassino, 1931)

= Scopula inductata =

Species of geometer moth in subfamily Sterrhinae

Scopula inductata, the soft-lined wave, is a moth of the family Geometridae. It was described by Achille Guenée in 1857. It is found in North America, from Newfoundland to the coast of British Columbia, north to the Northwest Territories, south to Alabama and Utah.

The wingspan is 20–25 millimetres (0.79–0.98 in). Adults are on wing from July to September.

The larvae feed on Aster, Trifolium, Taraxacum, Ambrosia and Melilotus species.
