= Scopula sideraria =

Scientific classification
- Kingdom: Animalia
- Phylum: Arthropoda
- Class: Insecta
- Order: Lepidoptera
- Family: Geometridae
- Genus: Scopula
- Species: S. sideraria

Binomial name
- Scopula sideraria (Guenée, [1858])

Synonyms
- Acidalia sideraria Guenee, 1857; Acidalia bucephalaria Barnes & McDunnough, 1918 (nec. Chrétien, 1909); Acidalia californiaria Packard, 1871; Acidalia californiata Packard, 1876; Acidalia chretieni Barnes & Benjamin, 1923; Acidalia magnetaria Guenee, 1857; Holarctias magnetaria; Acidalia pacificaria Packard, 1871; Acidalia rubrolinearia Packard, 1873; Holarctias rubrolinearia; Scopula rubrolineata Gumppenberg, 1892

Species of geometer moth in subfamily Sterrhinae

Scopula sideraria is a moth of the family Geometridae. It is found in western North America, from southern British Columbia to San Diego County, California.
