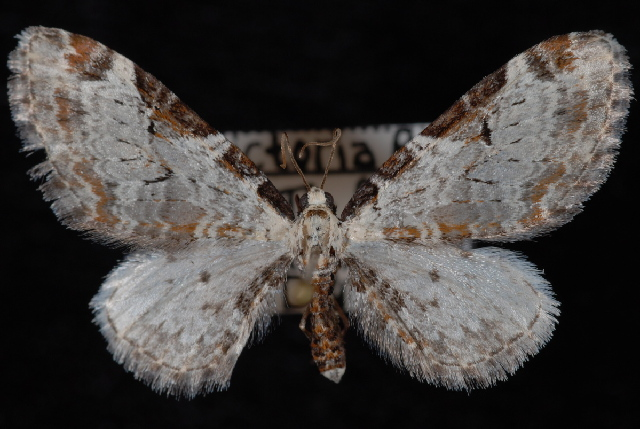

Scientific classification
- Kingdom: Animalia
- Phylum: Arthropoda
- Clade: Pancrustacea
- Class: Insecta
- Order: Lepidoptera
- Family: Geometridae
- Genus: Eupithecia
- Species: E. ravocostaliata

Binomial name
- Eupithecia ravocostaliata Packard, 1876

= Eupithecia ravocostaliata =

Species of moth

Eupithecia ravocostaliata, commonly known as the tawny eupithecia or great variegated pug, is a species of moth in the family Geometridae. The species was first described by Alpheus Spring Packard in 1876. It is found in northern New York and the New England states, extending across Canada from the Maritime provinces to Vancouver Island and down the west coast as far as the San Francisco Bay region.

The wingspan is about 20 mm. Adults have been recorded on wing from January to August.

The larvae feed on the foliage of Rhamnus purshiana.

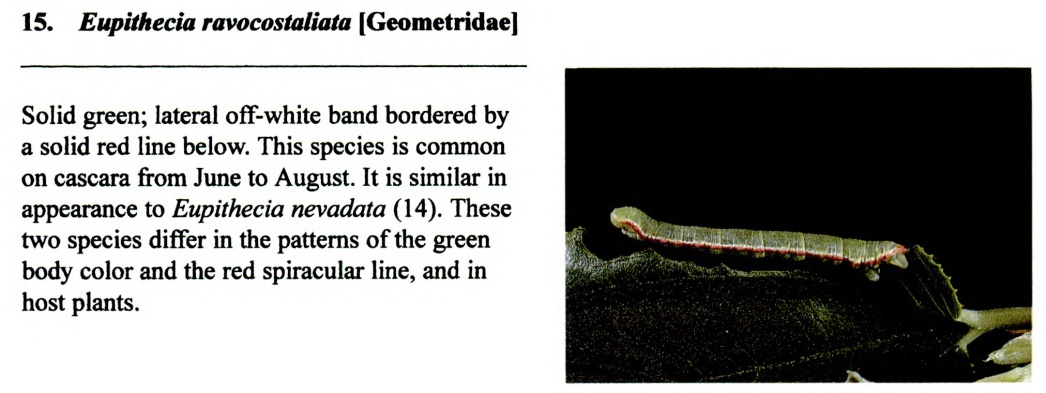
Eupithecia ravocostaliata caterpillar
