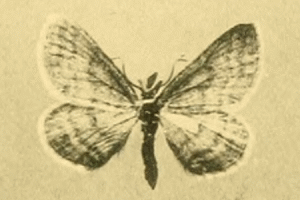

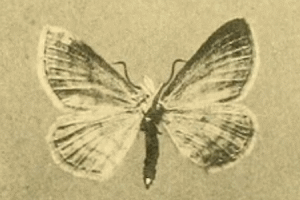

Scientific classification
- Domain: Eukaryota
- Kingdom: Animalia
- Phylum: Arthropoda
- Class: Insecta
- Order: Lepidoptera
- Family: Geometridae
- Genus: Scopula
- Species: S. cajanderi

Binomial name
- Scopula cajanderi (Herz, 1903)

Synonyms
- Acidalia cajanderi Herz, 1904; Acidalia anaitaria Herz, 1904; Scopula elwesi achlyoides Prout, 1935; Scopula elwesi sajanensis Prout, 1935; Scopula septentrionicola McDunnough, 1939

= Scopula cajanderi =

Species of geometer moth in subfamily Sterrhinae

Scopula cajanderi is a moth of the family Geometridae. It has a Holarctic, distribution, which includes Russia, Alaska and Yukon.

The wingspan is 21–23 millimetres (0.83–0.91 in). Adults have dark grey to reddish brown wings.
