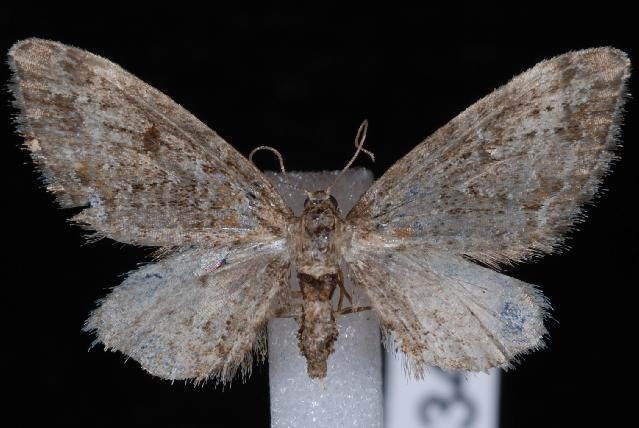

Scientific classification
- Kingdom: Animalia
- Phylum: Arthropoda
- Clade: Pancrustacea
- Class: Insecta
- Order: Lepidoptera
- Family: Geometridae
- Genus: Eupithecia
- Species: E. rotundopuncta

Binomial name
- Eupithecia rotundopuncta Packard, 1871

Synonyms
- Eupithecia californiata Gumppenberg, 1888; Eupithecia rotundopunctata Packard, 1876

= Eupithecia rotundopuncta =

Species of moth

Eupithecia rotundopuncta is a moth in the family Geometridae first described by Alpheus Spring Packard in 1871. It is found in western North America from Arizona to the Pacific coast, north to Vancouver Island in British Columbia.

The wingspan is about 17–20 mm.
