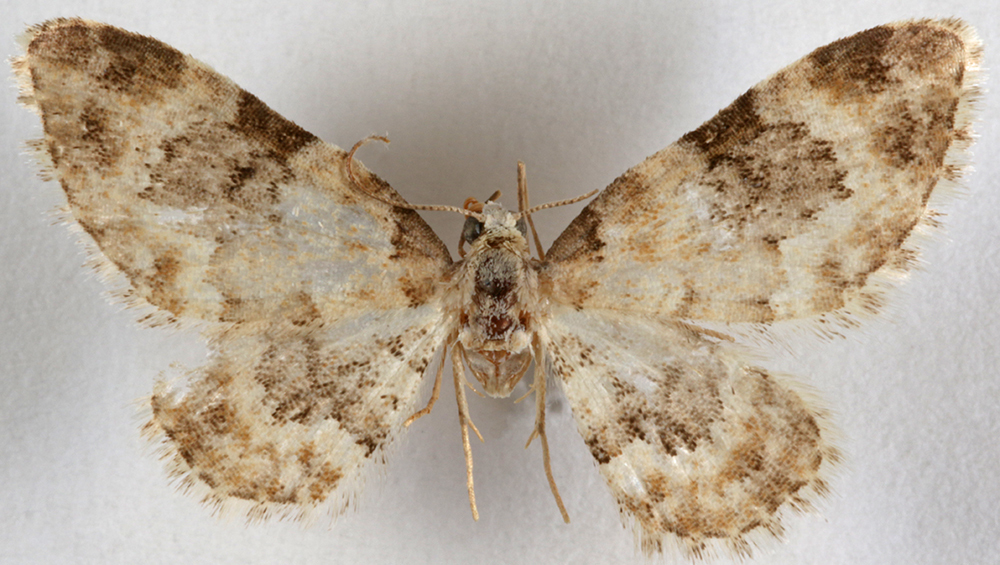

Scientific classification
- Domain: Eukaryota
- Kingdom: Animalia
- Phylum: Arthropoda
- Class: Insecta
- Order: Lepidoptera
- Family: Geometridae
- Genus: Eupithecia
- Species: E. tenuata

Binomial name
- Eupithecia tenuata Hulst, 1880

Synonyms
- Eucymatoge tenuata

= Eupithecia tenuata =

Species of moth

Eupithecia tenuata is a species of moth in the family Geometridae. It was first described by George Duryea Hulst in 1880. It is found in western North America from southern British Columbia through the Rocky Mountain region to Arizona and New Mexico.

The wingspan is about 16 mm. Adults have been recorded on wing in July and August.
