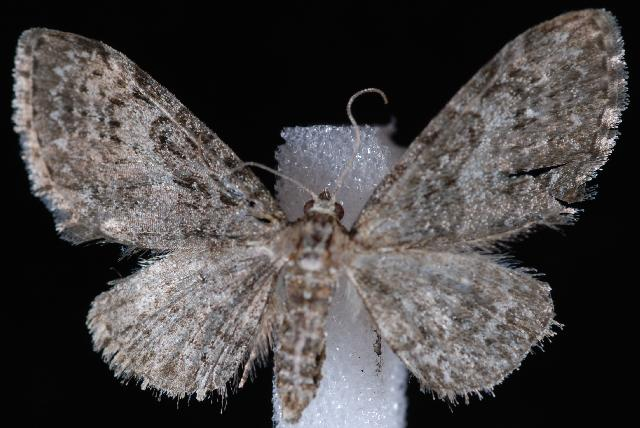

Scientific classification
- Domain: Eukaryota
- Kingdom: Animalia
- Phylum: Arthropoda
- Class: Insecta
- Order: Lepidoptera
- Family: Geometridae
- Genus: Eupithecia
- Species: E. sharronata

Binomial name
- Eupithecia sharronata Bolte, 1990

= Eupithecia sharronata =

Species of moth

Eupithecia sharronata is a moth in the family Geometridae. It is found in North America, including Alberta, British Columbia, Manitoba, Newfoundland and Labrador and Ontario.

Adults have been recorded on wing from May to August.

The larvae feed on Salix species.
