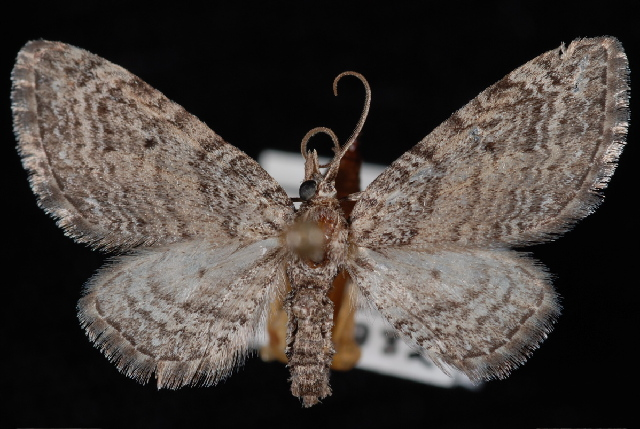

Scientific classification
- Domain: Eukaryota
- Kingdom: Animalia
- Phylum: Arthropoda
- Class: Insecta
- Order: Lepidoptera
- Family: Geometridae
- Genus: Eupithecia
- Species: E. pseudotsugata

Binomial name
- Eupithecia pseudotsugata MacKay, 1951

= Eupithecia pseudotsugata =

Species of moth

Eupithecia pseudotsugata is a moth in the family Geometridae. It is found in North America, including Alberta, British Columbia and Colorado.
