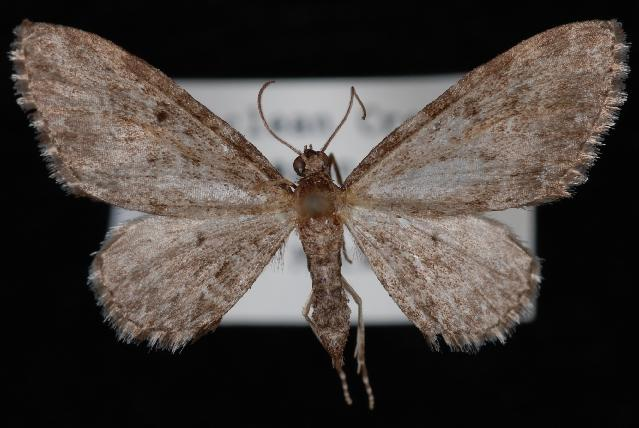

Scientific classification
- Domain: Eukaryota
- Kingdom: Animalia
- Phylum: Arthropoda
- Class: Insecta
- Order: Lepidoptera
- Family: Geometridae
- Genus: Eupithecia
- Species: E. lachrymosa

Binomial name
- Eupithecia lachrymosa (Hulst, 1900)

Synonyms
- Tephroclystia lachrymosa Hulst, 1900; Eupithecia georgii McDunnough, 1929; Eupithecia kananaskata MacKay, 1951

= Eupithecia lachrymosa =

Species of moth

Eupithecia lachrymosa is a moth in the family Geometridae first described by George Duryea Hulst in 1900. It is found in North America from central Saskatchewan west to southern Vancouver Island, north to British Columbia and Alberta and south to California.

The wingspan is 19–24 mm.

The larvae feed on Betula papyrifera, Salix, Ceanothus, and Alnus species.
