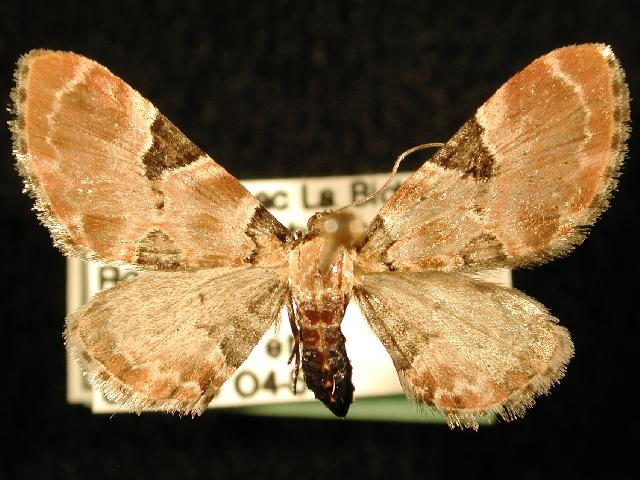

Scientific classification
- Domain: Eukaryota
- Kingdom: Animalia
- Phylum: Arthropoda
- Class: Insecta
- Order: Lepidoptera
- Family: Geometridae
- Genus: Eupithecia
- Species: E. stellata

Binomial name
- Eupithecia stellata (Hulst, 1896)

Synonyms
- Tephroclystia stellata Hulst, 1896

= Eupithecia stellata =

Species of moth

Eupithecia stellata is a moth in the family Geometridae first described by George Duryea Hulst in 1896. It is found in North America from central Manitoba to northern Alberta and south to California and Mexico.

The wingspan is about 20 mm. There are two generations with adults on wing in early June and again from late July to the beginning of September.
