= Eupithecia strattonata =

Scientific classification
- Kingdom: Animalia
- Phylum: Arthropoda
- Clade: Pancrustacea
- Class: Insecta
- Order: Lepidoptera
- Family: Geometridae
- Genus: Eupithecia
- Species: E. strattonata

Binomial name
- Eupithecia strattonata Packard, 1873

Species of moth

Eupithecia strattonata is a moth in the family Geometridae. It is found from Newfoundland and Labrador and Nova Scotia to Ontario and bordering areas in the north-eastern United States. The habitat consists of damp fields and open areas, abandoned pastures, marshes, bogs or other flat wet areas.

The wingspan is about 17 mm. Adults are on wing in June and July.

The larvae feed on Alnus and Spiraea species. One individual larva was reared on the fruit of Actaea rubra.
