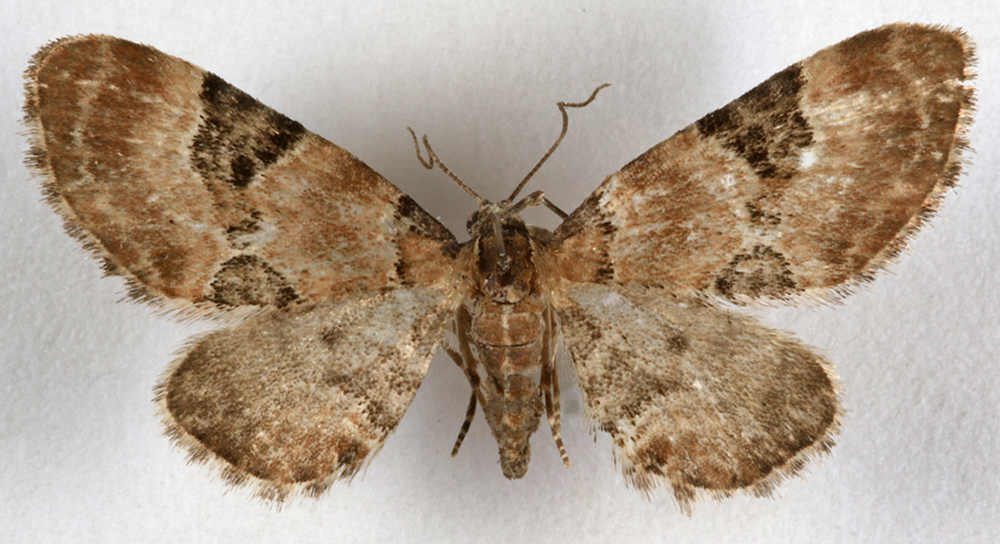

Scientific classification
- Domain: Eukaryota
- Kingdom: Animalia
- Phylum: Arthropoda
- Class: Insecta
- Order: Lepidoptera
- Family: Geometridae
- Genus: Eupithecia
- Species: E. bowmani

Binomial name
- Eupithecia bowmani Cassino & Swett, 1923

= Eupithecia bowmani =

Species of moth

Eupithecia bowmani is a moth species in the Geometridae family. It is found in the Rocky Mountains region of Alberta and British Columbia, as well as Indiana and Michigan.

The wingspan is about 14 mm. Adults have been recorded from April to July.
