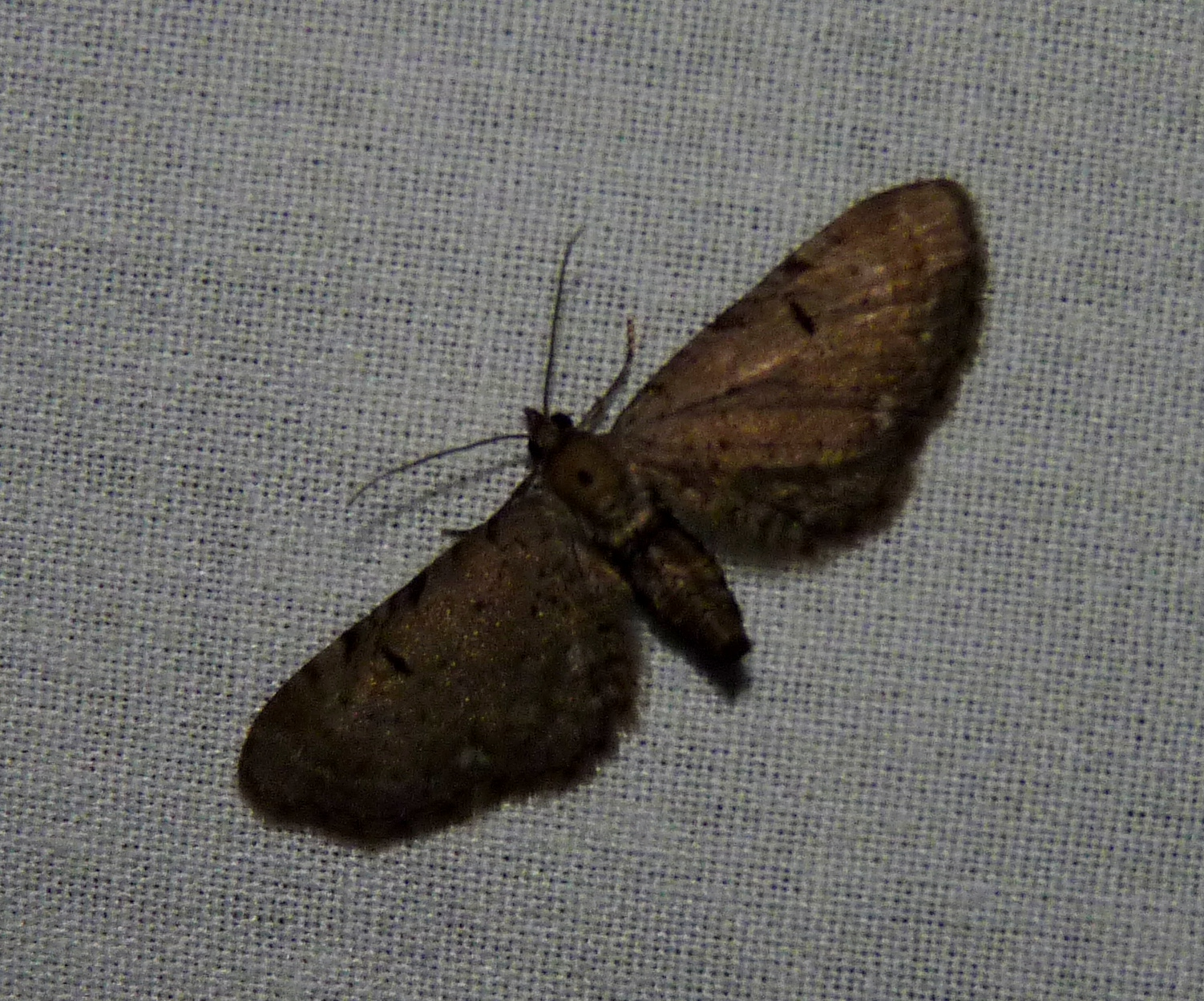

Scientific classification
- Kingdom: Animalia
- Phylum: Arthropoda
- Class: Insecta
- Order: Lepidoptera
- Family: Geometridae
- Genus: Eupithecia
- Species: E. miserulata

Binomial name
- Eupithecia miserulata Grote, 1863

Synonyms
- Eupithecia grossbeckiata Swett, 1907; Tephroclystia nebulosa Hulst, 1896; Eupithecia nebulosa; Tephroclystia plumbaria Hulst, 1900; Eupithecia plumbaria

= Eupithecia miserulata =

Species of moth

Eupithecia miserulata, the common eupithecia, is a moth of the family Geometridae. The species was first described by Augustus Radcliffe Grote in 1863 and it can be found in North America, from Ontario and Maine in the north to Florida, Mississippi, Louisiana and Texas in the south. It is also found in Arizona and California.

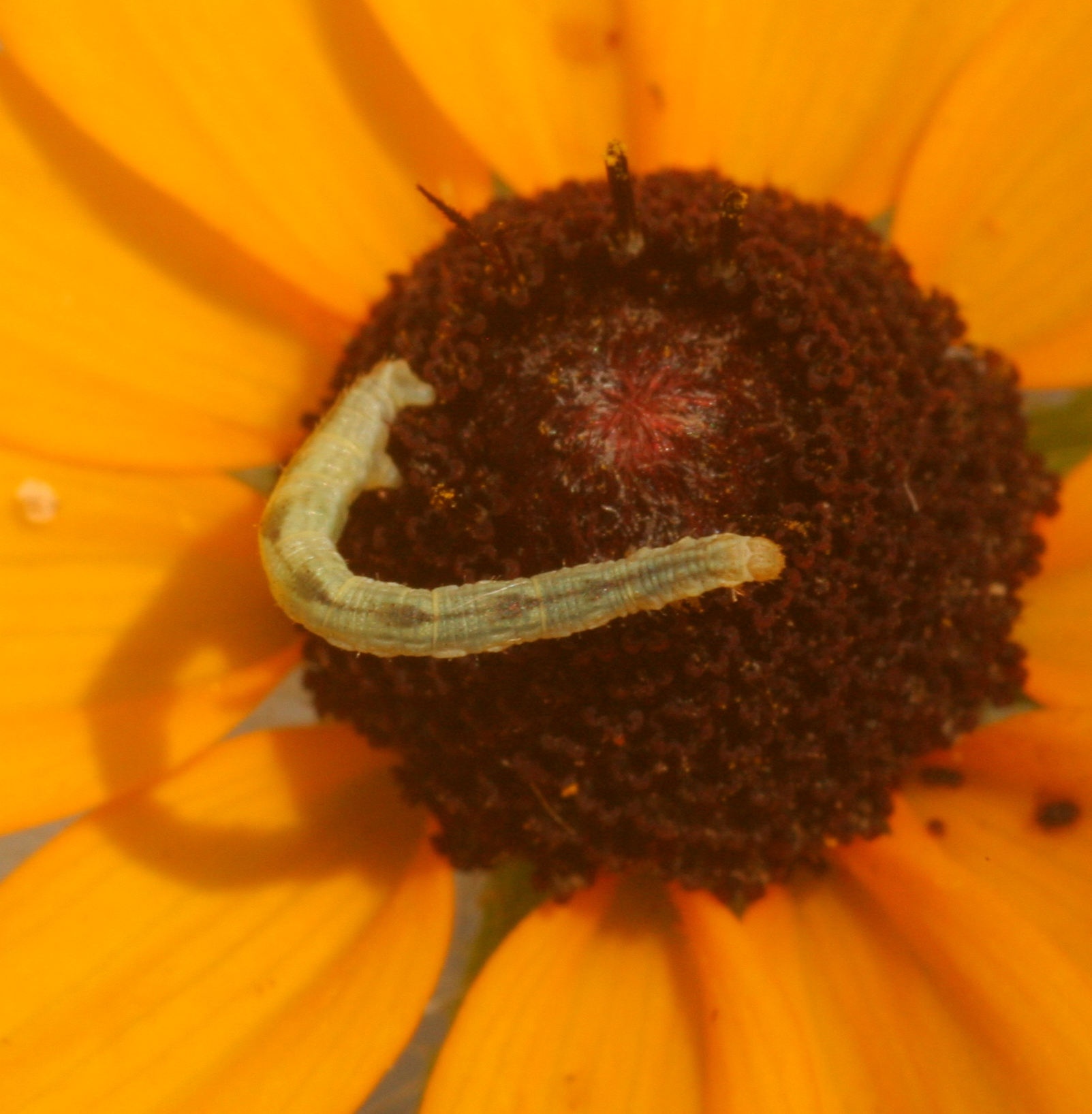
Caterpillar

The wingspan is 12–20 mm. The moths flies from March to November depending on the location.

The larvae feed on a wide range of plants, including coneflower, asters, willows, cherry, juniper and clover.

== Subspecies ==
- Eupithecia miserulata miserulata (most of eastern North America)
- Eupithecia miserulata vitans Schaus, 1913
- Eupithecia miserulata zela Swett & Cassino, 1919 (California)
