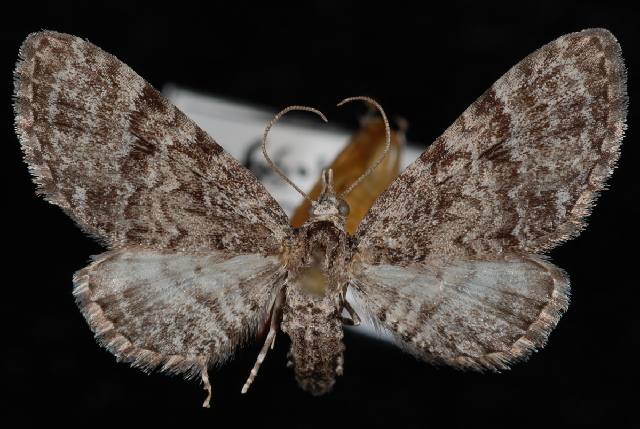

Scientific classification
- Domain: Eukaryota
- Kingdom: Animalia
- Phylum: Arthropoda
- Class: Insecta
- Order: Lepidoptera
- Family: Geometridae
- Genus: Eupithecia
- Species: E. ornata

Binomial name
- Eupithecia ornata (Hulst, 1896)

Synonyms
- Tephroclystis ornata Hulst, 1896; Eupithecia exornata Barnes & McDunnough, 1912

= Eupithecia ornata =

Species of moth

Eupithecia ornata is a moth in the family Geometridae. It is found from British Columbia and Alberta, south to California, Arizona and Nevada.

The wingspan is about 21 mm. Adults are on wing from June to July and again from August to December.

The larvae feed the needles of various Pinus species, including Pinus ponderosa, Pinus contorta var. contorta and Pinus monticola. Full-grown larvae reach a length of 20 mm. The larvae can be found from July to September. The species overwinters in the pupal stage and pupation occurs from August to September.
