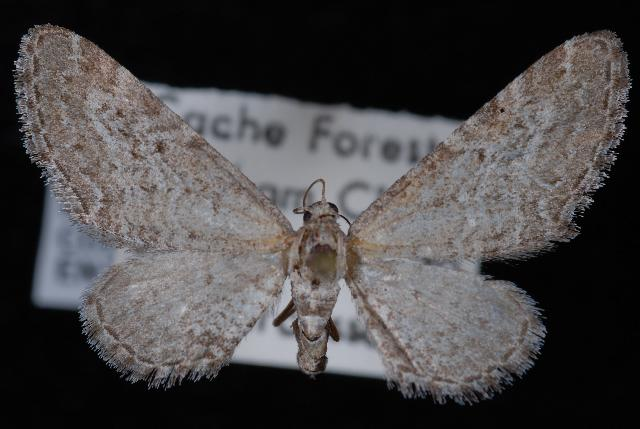

Scientific classification
- Kingdom: Animalia
- Phylum: Arthropoda
- Clade: Pancrustacea
- Class: Insecta
- Order: Lepidoptera
- Family: Geometridae
- Genus: Eupithecia
- Species: E. behrensata

Binomial name
- Eupithecia behrensata Packard, 1876

Synonyms
- Eupithecia monterata Cassino & Swett, 1922; Eupithecia perillata Pearsall, 1912

= Eupithecia behrensata =

Species of moth

Eupithecia behrensata is a moth in the family Geometridae first described by Alpheus Spring Packard in 1876. It is found in North America from California north to British Columbia, Alberta and Saskatchewan.

Adults are large and grey brown. Adults have been recorded on wing from March to August.
