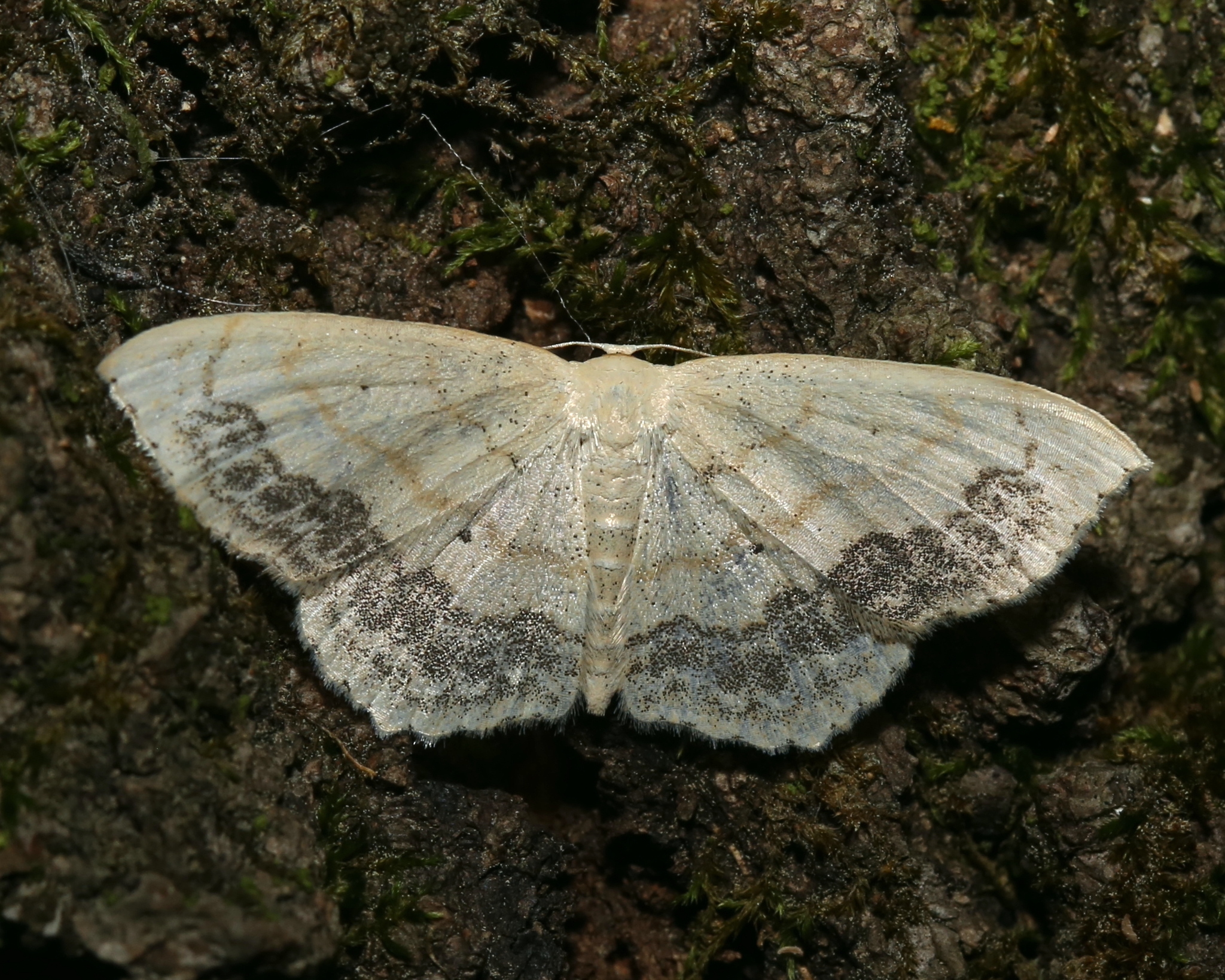

Scientific classification
- Kingdom: Animalia
- Phylum: Arthropoda
- Class: Insecta
- Order: Lepidoptera
- Family: Geometridae
- Genus: Scopula
- Species: S. limboundata

Binomial name
- Scopula limboundata (Haworth, 1809)

Synonyms
- Phalaena limboundata Haworth, 1809; Acidalia enucleata Guenée, 1857; Scopula restrictata (Walker, 1861); Acidalia restricata Walker, 1861; Scopula reconditaria (Walker, 1861); Acidalia reconditaria Walker, 1861; Scopula mensurata (Walker, 1866); Acidalia mensurata Walker, 1866; Scopula continuaria (Walker, 1866); Acidalia continuaria Walker, 1866; Scopula nigrodiscalis (Hulst, 1898); Leptomeris nigrodiscalis Hulst, 1898; Scopula relevata (Swett, 1907); Synelys relevata Swett, 1907; Scopula adornata (Prout, 1907); Synelys adornata Prout, 1907

= Scopula limboundata =

Large lace-border

Species of geometer moth in subfamily Sterrhinae

Scopula limboundata, the large lace-border, is a moth of the family Geometridae. It was described by Adrian Hardy Haworth in 1809. It is found in North America east of the Rocky Mountains. There is a single and unconfirmed record from Great Britain.

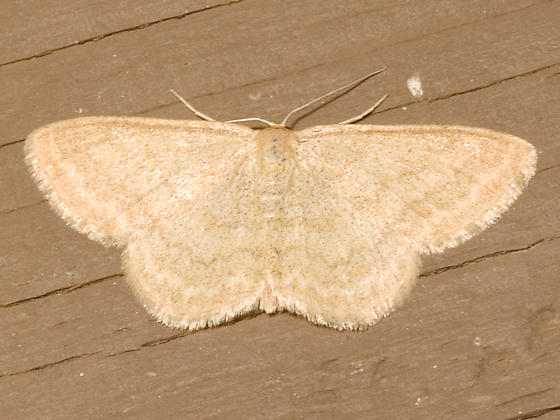

The wingspan is 25–30 millimetres (0.98–1.18 in). Adults are on wing from late May to late August or early September.

The larvae feed on apple, blueberry, clover, dandelion, meadow-beauty, and black cherry.
