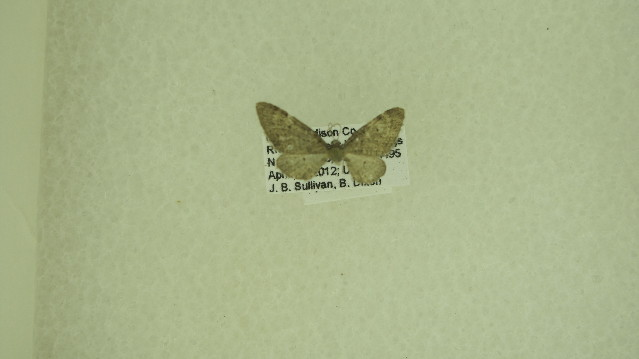

Scientific classification
- Domain: Eukaryota
- Kingdom: Animalia
- Phylum: Arthropoda
- Class: Insecta
- Order: Lepidoptera
- Family: Geometridae
- Genus: Eupithecia
- Species: E. swettii

Binomial name
- Eupithecia swettii Grossbeck, 1907

Synonyms
- Eupithecia ritaria Cassino, 1927

= Eupithecia swettii =

Species of moth

Eupithecia swettii is a moth in the family Geometridae first described by John Arthur Grossbeck in 1907. It is found in eastern North America, from Quebec and Massachusetts to North Carolina in the south-east and through Missouri and Kansas to Mississippi. It is also found in eastern Texas.

The length of the forewings is 8.5–10.5 mm. Adults are on wing from January to April in the south and to May and even July in the north.
