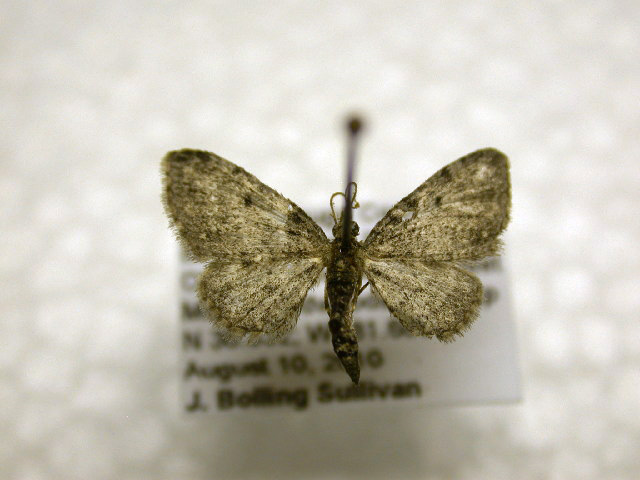

Scientific classification
- Domain: Eukaryota
- Kingdom: Animalia
- Phylum: Arthropoda
- Class: Insecta
- Order: Lepidoptera
- Family: Geometridae
- Genus: Eupithecia
- Species: E. russeliata

Binomial name
- Eupithecia russeliata Swett, 1908

Synonyms
- Eupithecia brauneata Swett, 1908

= Eupithecia russeliata =

Species of moth

Eupithecia russeliata is a moth in the family Geometridae first described by Louis W. Swett in 1908. It is widespread in North America, including Alberta, California, Kentucky, Maine, Maryland, Minnesota, New Brunswick, Newfoundland and Labrador, North Carolina and Nova Scotia.

The wingspan is about 18mm. Adults have been recorded on wing from May to October.

The larvae feed on Picea species and possibly other conifers.
