= Macaria sulphurea =

Scientific classification
- Kingdom: Animalia
- Phylum: Arthropoda
- Clade: Pancrustacea
- Class: Insecta
- Order: Lepidoptera
- Family: Geometridae
- Genus: Macaria
- Species: M. sulphurea

Binomial name
- Macaria sulphurea (Packard, 1873)

Synonyms
- Diastictis olivalis Packard, 1873; Eupistheria sulphurea Hulst, 1898; Speranza sulphurea Packard, 1873

Species of moth

Macaria sulphurea is a species of geometrid moth in the family Geometridae. It is found in North America. This species was formerly in the genus Speranza.

The MONA or Hodges number for Macaria sulphurea is 6283.
