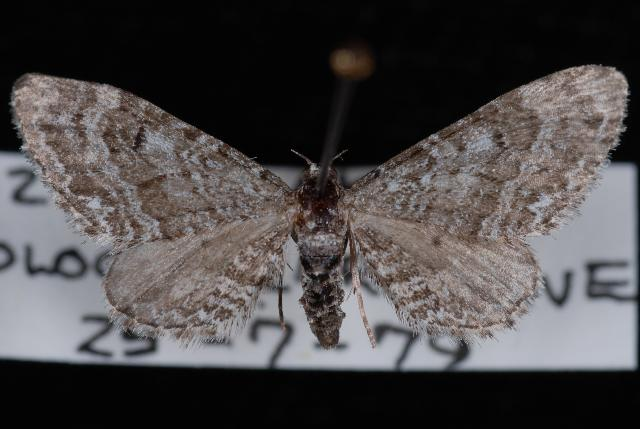

Scientific classification
- Kingdom: Animalia
- Phylum: Arthropoda
- Clade: Pancrustacea
- Class: Insecta
- Order: Lepidoptera
- Family: Geometridae
- Genus: Eupithecia
- Species: E. perfusca

Binomial name
- Eupithecia perfusca (Hulst, 1898)

Synonyms
- Tephroclystia perfusca Hulst, 1898; Eupithecia alberta Taylor, 1906; Tephroclystia cootenaiata Dyar, 1904; Eupithecia hanhami Taylor, 1906; Eupithecia kootenaiata Barnes & McDunnough, 1912; Eupithecia winnata Taylor, 1910; Eupithecia youngata Taylor, 1906

= Eupithecia perfusca =

Species of moth

Eupithecia perfusca is a moth in the family Geometridae first described by George Duryea Hulst in 1898. It is found in western North America.

The wingspan is about 21 mm.

The larvae feed on Salix, Alnus and Betula species.
