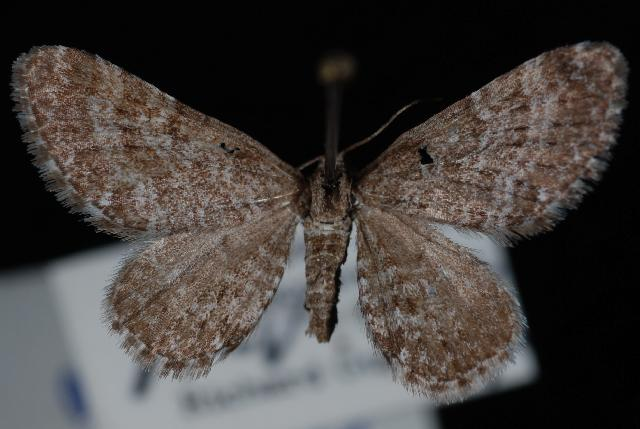

Scientific classification
- Domain: Eukaryota
- Kingdom: Animalia
- Phylum: Arthropoda
- Class: Insecta
- Order: Lepidoptera
- Family: Geometridae
- Genus: Eupithecia
- Species: E. regina

Binomial name
- Eupithecia regina Taylor, 1906

= Eupithecia regina =

Species of moth

Eupithecia regina is a moth in the family Geometridae first described by Taylor in 1906. It has been recorded in North America from Manitoba, Saskatchewan, Alberta, British Columbia, Georgia and North Carolina.
