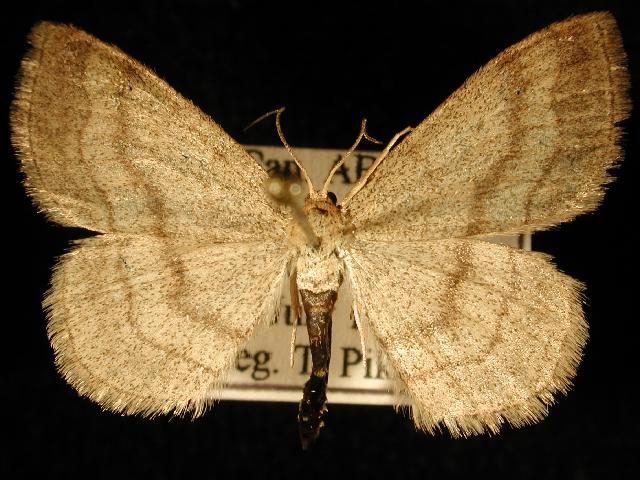

Scientific classification
- Domain: Eukaryota
- Kingdom: Animalia
- Phylum: Arthropoda
- Class: Insecta
- Order: Lepidoptera
- Family: Geometridae
- Genus: Scopula
- Species: S. siccata

Binomial name
- Scopula siccata McDunnough, 1939

= Scopula siccata =

Species of geometer moth in subfamily Sterrhinae

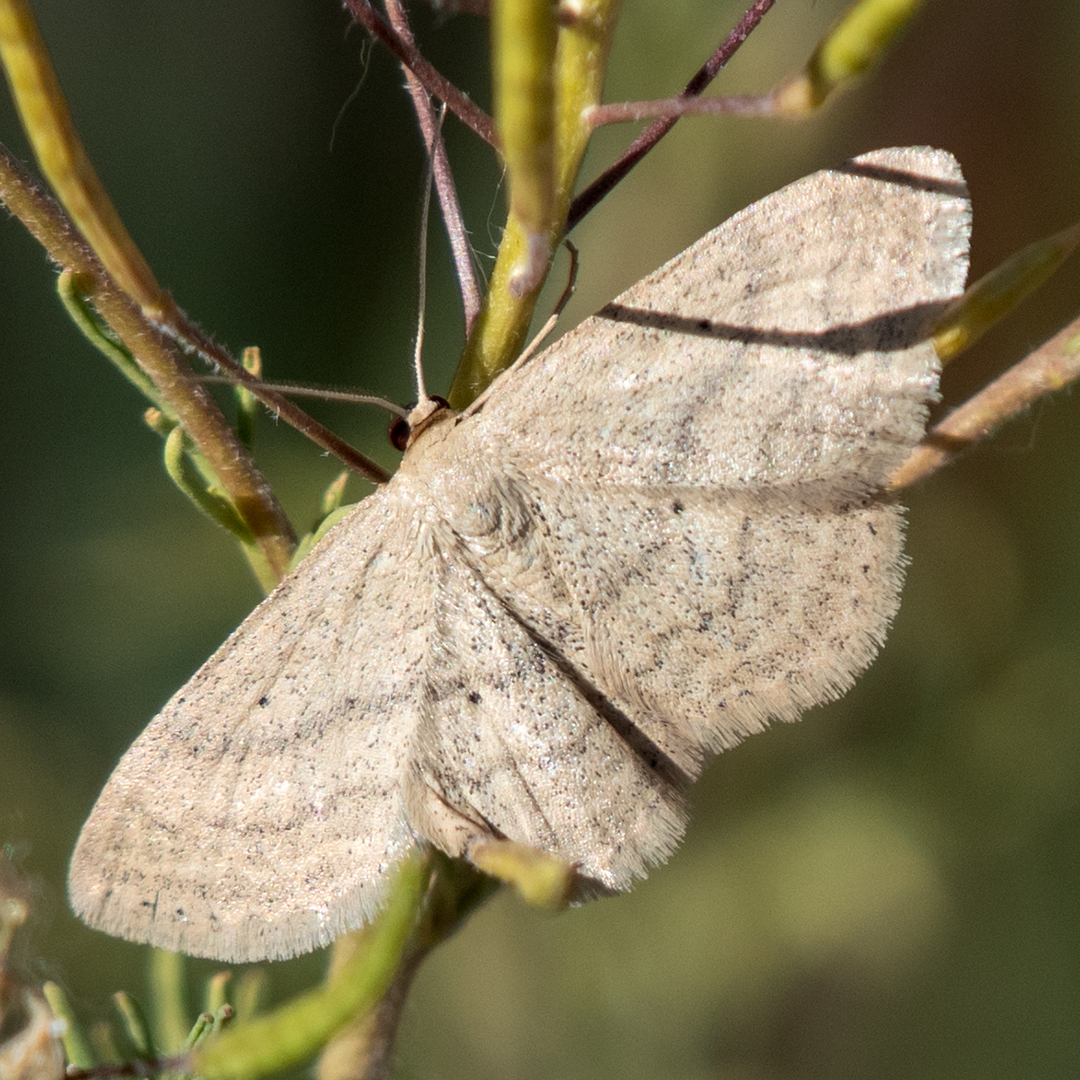
Scopula siccata on tansymustard, Descuriana sp. Photo taken at Los Poblanos Open Space, Albuquerque, N.M.

Scopula siccata is a moth of the family Geometridae first described by James Halliday McDunnough in 1939. It is found in North America from northern Colorado north through Wyoming, western Montana and Idaho to southern British Columbia and south-western Alberta. The habitat consists of dry slopes in mountainous areas.

The wingspan is 23–24 mm.
