= Scopula purata =

Scientific classification
- Kingdom: Animalia
- Phylum: Arthropoda
- Class: Insecta
- Order: Lepidoptera
- Family: Geometridae
- Genus: Scopula
- Species: S. purata

Binomial name
- Scopula purata (Guenée, [1858])

Synonyms
- Acidalia purata Guenee, 1857; Synelys nigrocandida Hulst, 1898

Species of geometer moth in subfamily Sterrhinae

Scopula purata, the chalky wave, is a moth of the family Geometridae. The species was first described by Achille Guenée in 1858. It is found in eastern North America, from Ontario and New Hampshire to Florida and to Mississippi.
