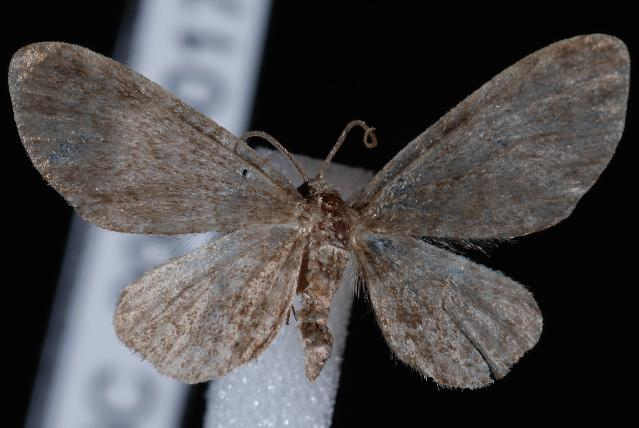

Scientific classification
- Domain: Eukaryota
- Kingdom: Animalia
- Phylum: Arthropoda
- Class: Insecta
- Order: Lepidoptera
- Family: Geometridae
- Genus: Eupithecia
- Species: E. bryanti

Binomial name
- Eupithecia bryanti Taylor, 1906

Synonyms
- Eupithecia modesta Taylor, 1906

= Eupithecia bryanti =

Species of moth

Eupithecia bryanti is a moth in the family Geometridae first described by Taylor in 1906. It is found from Alaska, the Yukon Territory, Alberta and British Columbia, through Washington, Oregon, Montana, Idaho, Wyoming and Utah to California.

Adults have been recorded on wing from April to August.
