= Scopula fuscata =

Scientific classification
- Domain: Eukaryota
- Kingdom: Animalia
- Phylum: Arthropoda
- Class: Insecta
- Order: Lepidoptera
- Family: Geometridae
- Genus: Scopula
- Species: S. fuscata

Binomial name
- Scopula fuscata (Hulst, 1887)

Synonyms
- Acidalia fuscata Hulst, 1887

Species of geometer moth in subfamily Sterrhinae

Scopula fuscata is a species of moth in the family Geometridae. It was first described by George Duryea Hulst in 1887. It is found in North America from south-western Saskatchewan west to British Columbia and south to California and Arizona. The habitat consists of montane areas, including foothills.

The wingspan is 24–28 millimetres (0.94–1.10 in).
