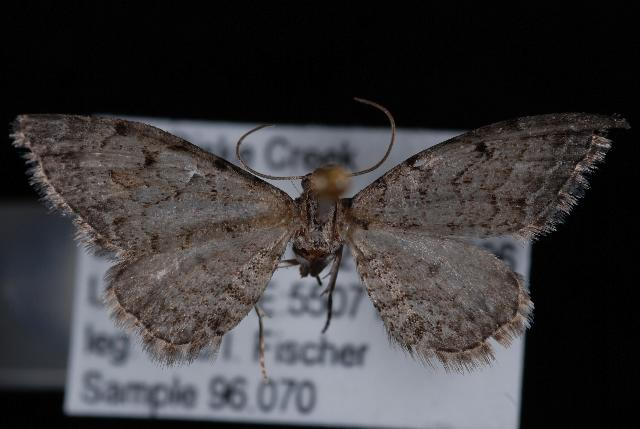

Scientific classification
- Domain: Eukaryota
- Kingdom: Animalia
- Phylum: Arthropoda
- Class: Insecta
- Order: Lepidoptera
- Family: Geometridae
- Genus: Eupithecia
- Species: E. borealis

Binomial name
- Eupithecia borealis (Hulst, 1898)

Synonyms
- Tephroclystia borealis Hulst, 1898

= Eupithecia borealis =

Species of moth

Eupithecia borealis is a moth in the family Geometridae first described by George Duryea Hulst in 1898. It is found in North America, including Alberta, Arizona, British Columbia, California, Colorado, Manitoba, Michigan, Montana, New Brunswick, New Mexico, New York, Newfoundland and Labrador, Nova Scotia, Ontario, Quebec, Utah and Wyoming.

The wingspan is about 14 mm. The forewings are light brown with blackish crosslines. Adults have been recorded on wing from May to August.
