= Eupithecia indistincta =

Scientific classification
- Domain: Eukaryota
- Kingdom: Animalia
- Phylum: Arthropoda
- Class: Insecta
- Order: Lepidoptera
- Family: Geometridae
- Genus: Eupithecia
- Species: E. indistincta

Binomial name
- Eupithecia indistincta Taylor, 1910

Species of moth

Eupithecia indistincta is a moth in the family Geometridae first described by Taylor in 1910. It is found in North America in Quebec and throughout the northern Atlantic states (including Vermont, Maine, Maryland, North Carolina and West Virginia). It has also been recorded from California.

The wings are chocolate brown. Adults have been recorded on wing from May to August.
