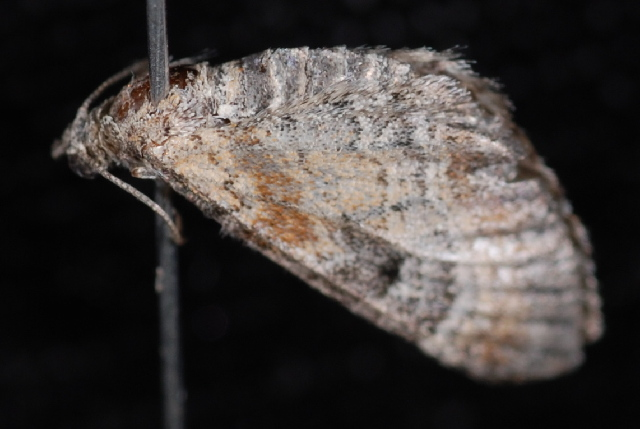

Scientific classification
- Domain: Eukaryota
- Kingdom: Animalia
- Phylum: Arthropoda
- Class: Insecta
- Order: Lepidoptera
- Family: Geometridae
- Genus: Eupithecia
- Species: E. johnstoni

Binomial name
- Eupithecia johnstoni McDunnough, 1946

Synonyms
- Eupithecia balboata Cassino & Swett, 1925

= Eupithecia johnstoni =

Species of moth

Eupithecia johnstoni is a moth in the family Geometridae. It is found in North America, including Alberta, British Columbia, California, Colorado, Michigan, New Brunswick, Ontario, Oregon and Washington.

The wingspan is about 18 mm. Adults have been recorded on wing from March to August.
