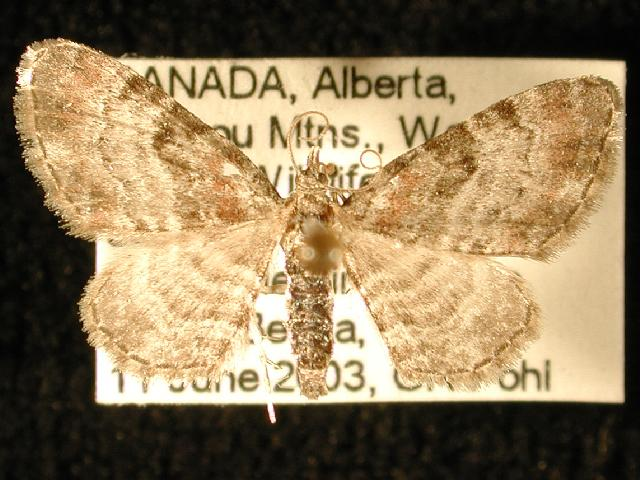

Scientific classification
- Kingdom: Animalia
- Phylum: Arthropoda
- Clade: Pancrustacea
- Class: Insecta
- Order: Lepidoptera
- Family: Geometridae
- Genus: Eupithecia
- Species: E. albicapitata

Binomial name
- Eupithecia albicapitata Packard, 1876

= Eupithecia albicapitata =

Species of moth

Eupithecia albicapitata is a moth in the family Geometridae first described by Alpheus Spring Packard in 1876. It is found from Newfoundland and Labrador to western British Columbia, north to Alaska and Alberta, south to New England and New York.

The wingspan is 14–18 mm.
