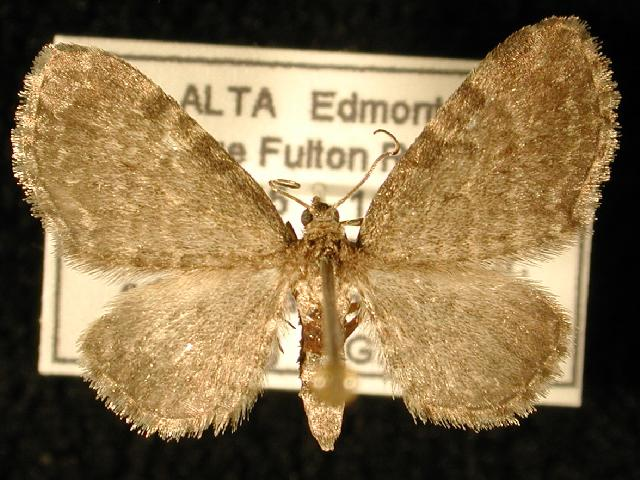

Scientific classification
- Domain: Eukaryota
- Kingdom: Animalia
- Phylum: Arthropoda
- Class: Insecta
- Order: Lepidoptera
- Family: Geometridae
- Genus: Eupithecia
- Species: E. cimicifugata

Binomial name
- Eupithecia cimicifugata Pearsall, 1908

Synonyms
- Eupithecia grata Taylor, 1910

= Eupithecia cimicifugata =

Species of moth

Eupithecia cimicifugata is a moth in the family Geometridae first described by Pearsall in 1908. It is found in North America, including Alberta, Ontario, Saskatchewan, Kentucky, Maryland and South Dakota.

The larvae feed on the fruit of Cimicifuga racemosa.
