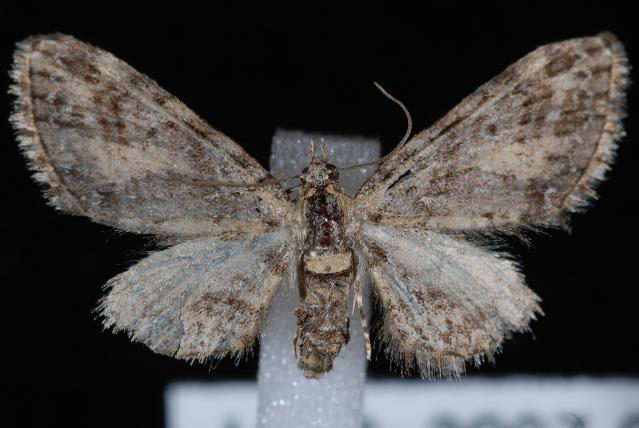

Scientific classification
- Domain: Eukaryota
- Kingdom: Animalia
- Phylum: Arthropoda
- Class: Insecta
- Order: Lepidoptera
- Family: Geometridae
- Genus: Eupithecia
- Species: E. maestosa

Binomial name
- Eupithecia maestosa (Hulst, 1896)

Synonyms
- Tephroclystia maestosa Hulst, 1896; Eupithecia dyarata Taylor, 1906; Tephroclystia harlequinaria Dyar, 1905; Eupithecia harlequinaria

= Eupithecia maestosa =

Species of moth

Eupithecia maestosa is a moth in the family Geometridae first described by George Duryea Hulst in 1896. It is found in North America from extreme western Alberta west to Vancouver Island, north to northern British Columbia and south to Texas and California. The habitat consists of wooded and shrubby areas.

The wingspan is 17–21 mm. Adults are dark yellow brown and grey. They are on wing nearly year round in California.
