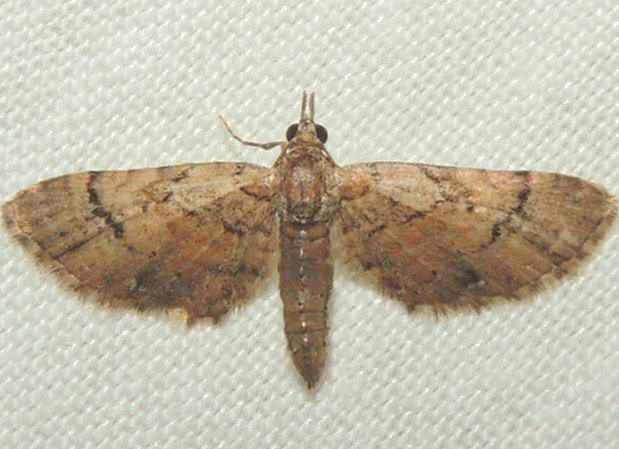
- Adult
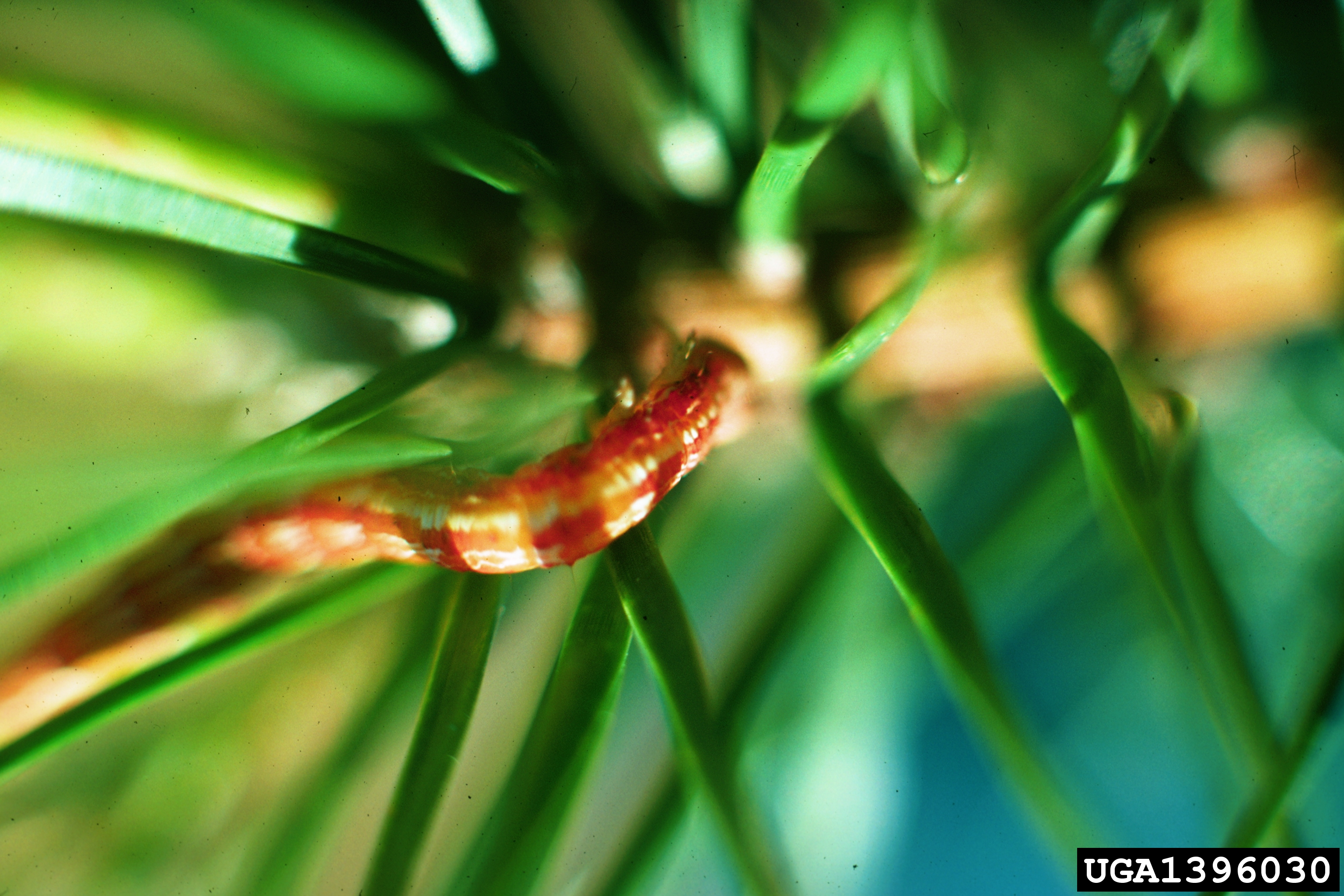
- Larva

Scientific classification
- Domain: Eukaryota
- Kingdom: Animalia
- Phylum: Arthropoda
- Class: Insecta
- Order: Lepidoptera
- Family: Geometridae
- Genus: Eupithecia
- Species: E. palpata

Binomial name
- Eupithecia palpata Packard, 1873

Synonyms
- Eupithecia transcanadata MacKay, 1951

= Eupithecia palpata =

Species of moth

Eupithecia palpata, the small pine looper, is a moth of the family Geometridae. The species was first described by Alpheus Spring Packard in 1873. It is found in Canada (Newfoundland, Nova Scotia, Prince Edward Island, New Brunswick, Quebec, Ontario, Manitoba, Saskatchewan, Alberta and British Columbia) and the north-eastern parts of the United States. The habitat consists of spruce woods.

The wingspan is about 23 mm.

The larvae feed on balsam fir, eastern hemlock, eastern larch, pines, spruces and possibly other conifers.
