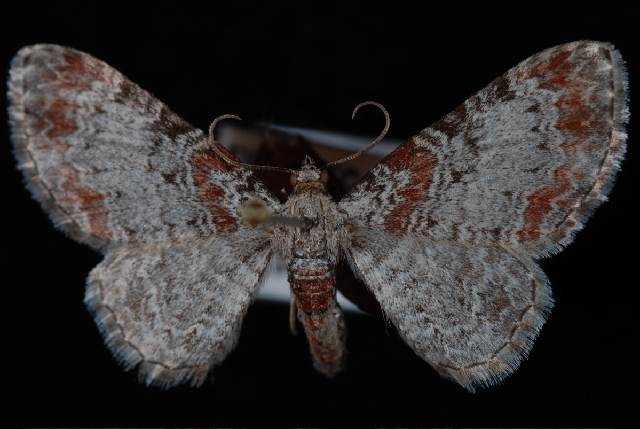

Scientific classification
- Kingdom: Animalia
- Phylum: Arthropoda
- Class: Insecta
- Order: Lepidoptera
- Family: Geometridae
- Genus: Eupithecia
- Species: E. spermaphaga

Binomial name
- Eupithecia spermaphaga (Dyar, 1917)

Synonyms
- Eucymatoge spermaphaga Dyar, 1917

= Eupithecia spermaphaga =

Species of moth

Eupithecia spermaphaga is a moth in the family Geometridae first described by Harrison Gray Dyar Jr. in 1917. It is found in western North America from British Columbia, through Oregon and Washington to Nevada and California.

The wingspan is about 23–26 mm. There is a gray tint to the ground color. Adults have been recorded on wing in March, April, July, August, September and October.

The larvae bore the cones of various trees, including Abies concolor, Abies shastaensis and Pseudotsuga taxifolia.
