= Eupithecia sheppardata =

Scientific classification
- Domain: Eukaryota
- Kingdom: Animalia
- Phylum: Arthropoda
- Class: Insecta
- Order: Lepidoptera
- Family: Geometridae
- Genus: Eupithecia
- Species: E. sheppardata

Binomial name
- Eupithecia sheppardata McDunnough, 1938

Species of moth

Eupithecia sheppardata is a moth in the family Geometridae first described by James Halliday McDunnough in 1938. It is found in North America, including New Brunswick, Ontario, Quebec, Maine and New York.

The wingspan is about 17 mm. Adults are light fawn grey.
