= Eupithecia ammonata =

Scientific classification
- Domain: Eukaryota
- Kingdom: Animalia
- Phylum: Arthropoda
- Class: Insecta
- Order: Lepidoptera
- Family: Geometridae
- Genus: Eupithecia
- Species: E. ammonata

Binomial name
- Eupithecia ammonata McDunnough, 1929

Species of moth

Eupithecia ammonata is a moth in the family Geometridae first described by James Halliday McDunnough in 1929. It is found in North America, including Manitoba, Saskatchewan, Alberta, Wisconsin and Arizona.

The wingspan is about 18 mm. The forewings are grey with extremely faint crosslines. Adults have been recorded on wing from May to August.
