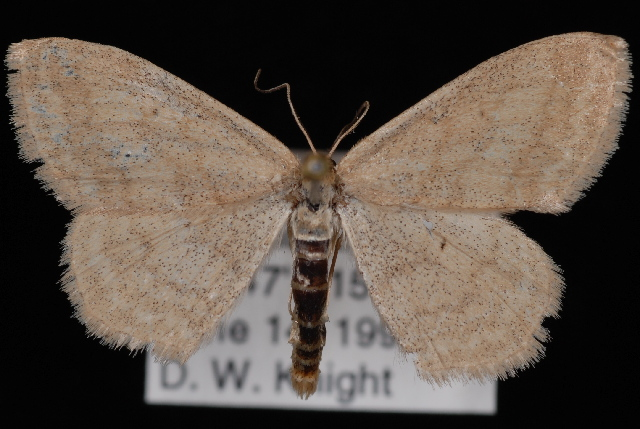

Scientific classification
- Domain: Eukaryota
- Kingdom: Animalia
- Phylum: Arthropoda
- Class: Insecta
- Order: Lepidoptera
- Family: Geometridae
- Genus: Scopula
- Species: S. luteolata

Binomial name
- Scopula luteolata (Hulst, 1880)

Synonyms
- Cidaria luteolata Hulst, 1880; Leptomeris subfuscata Taylor, 1906

= Scopula luteolata =

Species of geometer moth in subfamily Sterrhinae

Scopula luteolata is a moth of the family Geometridae. It is found in western North America. In Canada, the range extends from the mountains of south-western Alberta, north to Banff and west to Vancouver Island. In the United States, it has been recorded from Arizona, California, Montana, Nevada, New Mexico, Oregon, Washington and Wyoming. The habitat consists of montane wooded and shrubby openings and edges in forests.

The wingspan is 23–26 mm.
