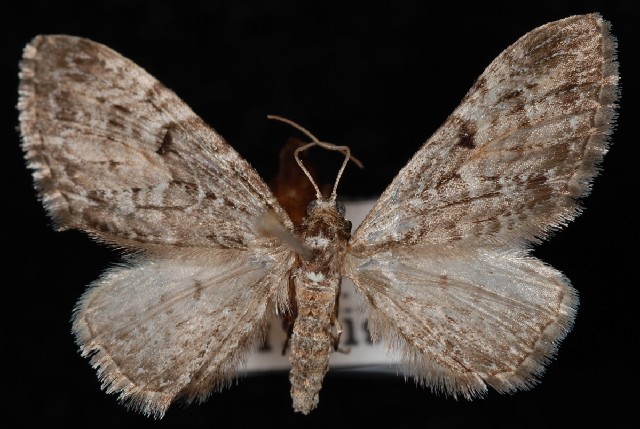

Scientific classification
- Domain: Eukaryota
- Kingdom: Animalia
- Phylum: Arthropoda
- Class: Insecta
- Order: Lepidoptera
- Family: Geometridae
- Genus: Eupithecia
- Species: E. harrisonata

Binomial name
- Eupithecia harrisonata MacKay, 1951

= Eupithecia harrisonata =

Species of moth

Eupithecia harrisonata is a moth in the family Geometridae. It is found in North America, from British Columbia to California.

Adults have been recorded on wing from March to May and again from July to August.
