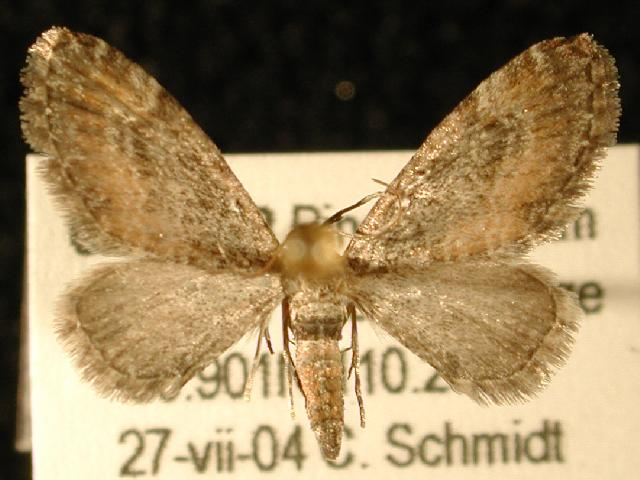

Scientific classification
- Domain: Eukaryota
- Kingdom: Animalia
- Phylum: Arthropoda
- Class: Insecta
- Order: Lepidoptera
- Family: Geometridae
- Genus: Eupithecia
- Species: E. coloradensis

Binomial name
- Eupithecia coloradensis (Hulst, 1896)

Synonyms
- Tephroclystia coloradensis Hulst, 1896; Eupithecia carolinensis Grossbeck, 1907; Eupithecia spenceata Cassino, 1927

= Eupithecia coloradensis =

Species of moth

Eupithecia coloradensis is a moth in the family Geometridae first described by George Duryea Hulst in 1896. It is found in North America from western Quebec and western Ontario south to North Carolina, west to New Mexico, Arizona, Colorado and south-eastern Alberta.

The wingspan is 14–19 mm.
