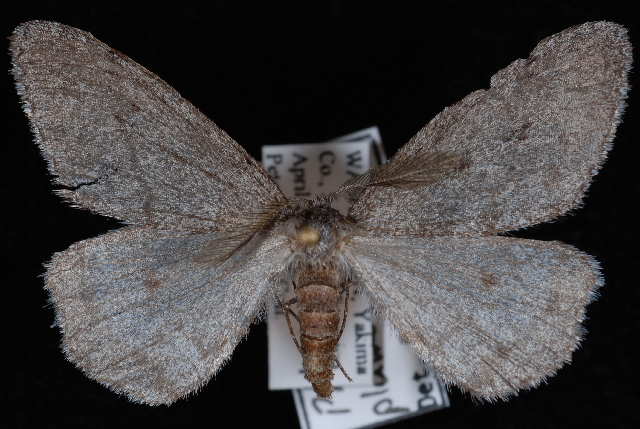

Scientific classification
- Kingdom: Animalia
- Phylum: Arthropoda
- Class: Insecta
- Order: Lepidoptera
- Family: Geometridae
- Genus: Phigalia
- Species: P. plumogeraria

Binomial name
- Phigalia plumogeraria (Hulst, 1888)

= Phigalia plumogeraria =

Species of moth

Phigalia plumogeraria, the walnut spanworm moth, is a species of geometrid moth in the family Geometridae.

The MONA or Hodges number for Phigalia plumogeraria is 6661.
