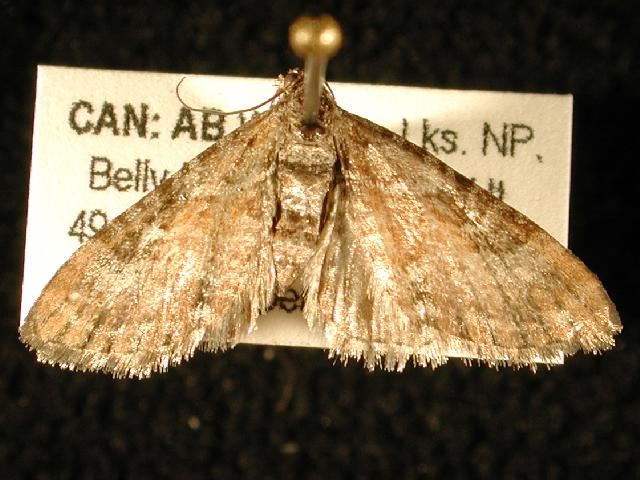

Scientific classification
- Kingdom: Animalia
- Phylum: Arthropoda
- Class: Insecta
- Order: Lepidoptera
- Family: Geometridae
- Genus: Eupithecia
- Species: E. anticaria

Binomial name
- Eupithecia anticaria Walker, 1862

Synonyms
- Eupithecia explanata Walker, 1862

= Eupithecia anticaria =

Species of moth

Eupithecia anticaria is a moth in the family Geometridae first described by Francis Walker in 1862. It is found from eastern Newfoundland and Labrador across Canada to western British Columbia, south to northern New Mexico and Apache and Coconino counties in Arizona.

The wingspan is about 18 mm. Adults are on wing from May to July.
