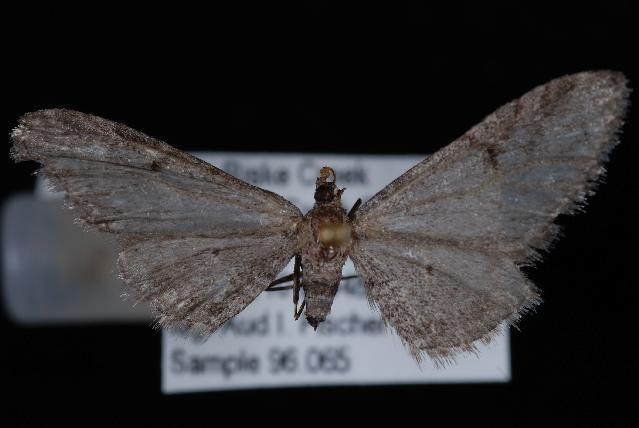

Scientific classification
- Domain: Eukaryota
- Kingdom: Animalia
- Phylum: Arthropoda
- Class: Insecta
- Order: Lepidoptera
- Family: Geometridae
- Genus: Eupithecia
- Species: E. multistrigata

Binomial name
- Eupithecia multistrigata (Hulst, 1896)

Synonyms
- Tephroclystia multistrigata Hulst, 1896; Eupithecia spaldingi Taylor, 1910

= Eupithecia multistrigata =

Species of moth

Eupithecia multistrigata is a moth in the family Geometridae first described by George Duryea Hulst in 1896. It is widespread in western North America, including the states and provinces of Alberta, Arizona, California, Colorado, Idaho, Montana, Nevada, New Mexico, Oregon, Saskatchewan, Utah, Washington and Wyoming.

The wingspan is about 20 mm.
