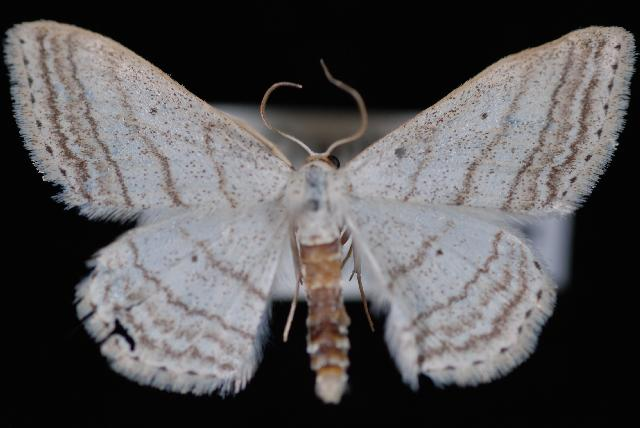

Scientific classification
- Domain: Eukaryota
- Kingdom: Animalia
- Phylum: Arthropoda
- Class: Insecta
- Order: Lepidoptera
- Family: Geometridae
- Genus: Scopula
- Species: S. ancellata

Binomial name
- Scopula ancellata (Hulst, 1887)

Synonyms
- Acidalia ancellata Hulst, 1887; Acidalia catenes Druce, 1892

= Scopula ancellata =

Species of geometer moth in subfamily Sterrhinae

Scopula ancellata, the angled wave moth or pointed-winged wave, is a moth of the family Geometridae. It was described by George Duryea Hulst in 1887. It is found in North America from Quebec west to the Northwest Territories and British Columbia and south to Michigan, Indiana and Arizona. The habitat consists of mixed wood and coniferous forests.

The wingspan is about 23 millimetres (0.91 in).

The larvae feed on Meliotus alba and Alnus tenuifolia.

== Subspecies ==
- Scopula ancellata ancellata
- Scopula ancellata catenes (Druce, 1892)
