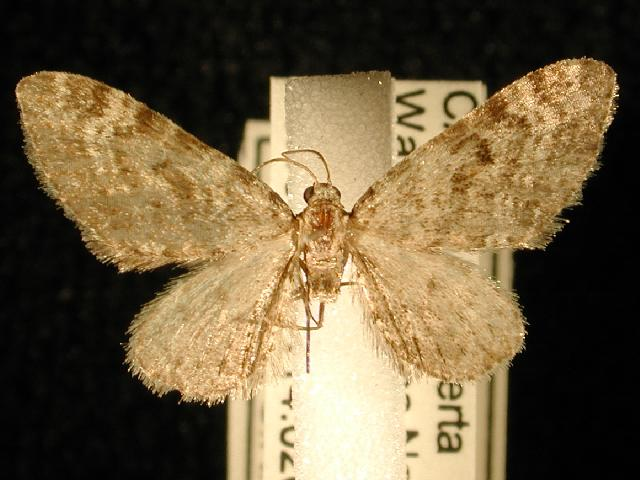

Scientific classification
- Domain: Eukaryota
- Kingdom: Animalia
- Phylum: Arthropoda
- Class: Insecta
- Order: Lepidoptera
- Family: Geometridae
- Genus: Eupithecia
- Species: E. niveifascia

Binomial name
- Eupithecia niveifascia (Hulst, 1898)

Synonyms
- Tephroclystia niveifascia Hulst, 1898; Tephroclystia analis Dyar, 1918; Eupithecia perbrunneata Taylor, 1906

= Eupithecia niveifascia =

Species of moth

Eupithecia niveifascia is a moth in the family Geometridae first described by George Duryea Hulst in 1898. It is found in North America from south-western Alberta west to Vancouver Island, north to northern coastal British Columbia and south to New Mexico.

The wingspan is 17–19 mm. Adults have been recorded on wing from the end of May to mid-July.
