= Eupithecia fletcherata =

Scientific classification
- Domain: Eukaryota
- Kingdom: Animalia
- Phylum: Arthropoda
- Class: Insecta
- Order: Lepidoptera
- Family: Geometridae
- Genus: Eupithecia
- Species: E. fletcherata

Binomial name
- Eupithecia fletcherata Taylor, 1907

Synonyms
- Eupithecia promulgata Pearsall, 1909; Eupithecia dolorosata Pearsall, 1910

Species of moth

Eupithecia fletcherata, or Fletcher's larch looper, is a moth of the family Geometridae described by George Taylor in 1907. It is found in Canada (Newfoundland and Labrador, Nova Scotia, New Brunswick, Quebec, Ontario and Manitoba) and the north-eastern parts of the United States (including Ohio and Missouri).

The species was named in honour of Dr. James Fletcher.
