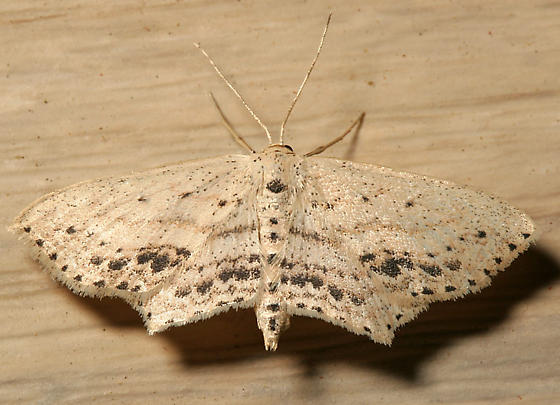

Scientific classification
- Domain: Eukaryota
- Kingdom: Animalia
- Phylum: Arthropoda
- Class: Insecta
- Order: Lepidoptera
- Family: Geometridae
- Genus: Scopula
- Species: S. cacuminaria

Binomial name
- Scopula cacuminaria (Morrison, 1874)

Synonyms
- Acidalia cacuminaria Morrison, 1874; Acidalia cacuminata Packard, 1876

= Scopula cacuminaria =

Species of geometer moth in subfamily Sterrhinae

Scopula cacuminaria, the frosted tan wave, is a moth of the family Geometridae. The species was first described by Herbert Knowles Morrison in 1874.

The wingspan is 18–23 millimetres (0.71–0.91 in). Adults are on wing in July in Alberta.
