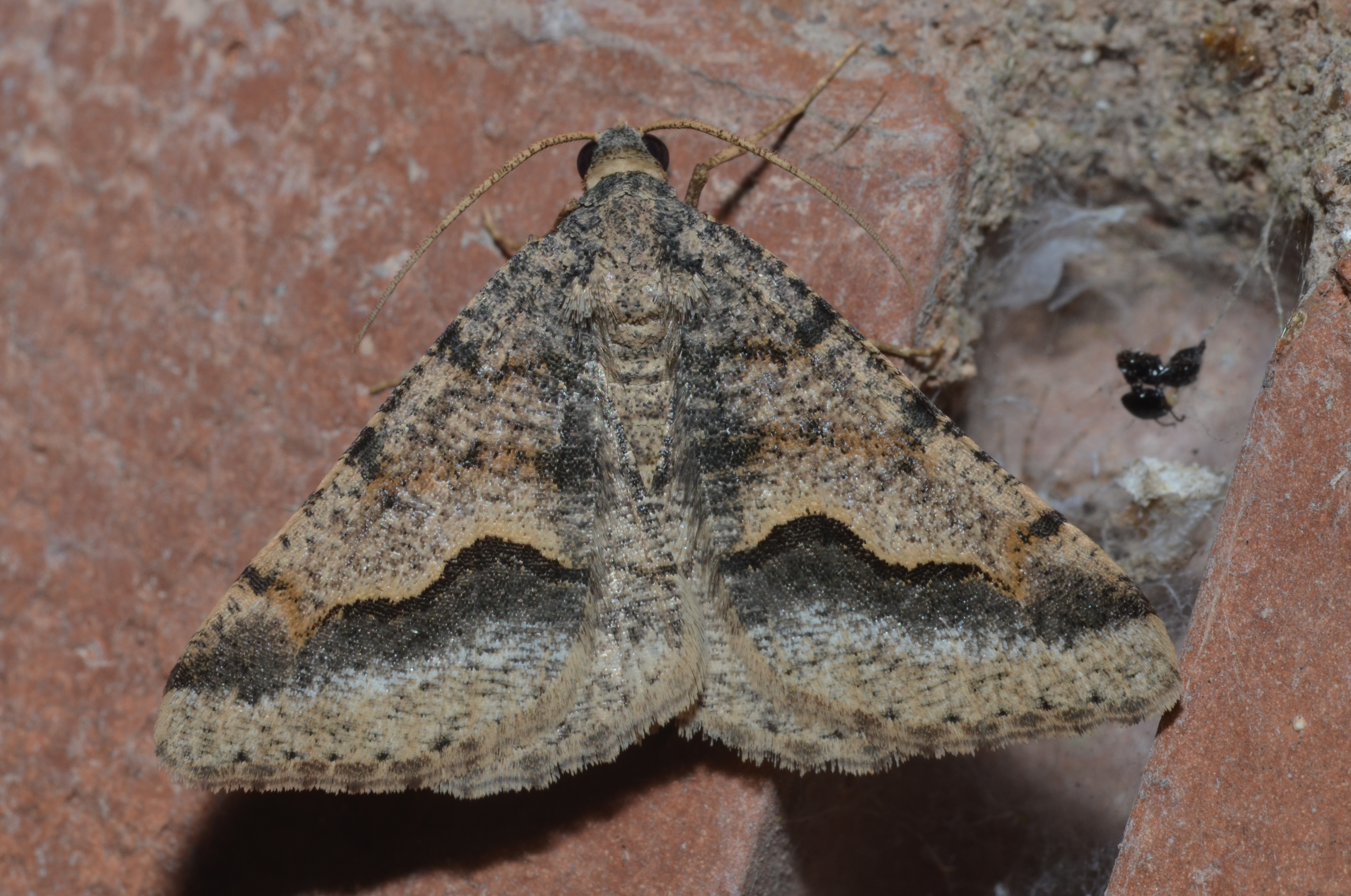
- Frederickia cyda, Mesquite Looper Moth

Scientific classification
- Kingdom: Animalia
- Phylum: Arthropoda
- Class: Insecta
- Order: Lepidoptera
- Family: Geometridae
- Subfamily: Ennominae
- Tribe: Macariini
- Genus: Frederickia
- Species: F. cyda

Binomial name
- Frederickia cyda (Druce, 1893)

Synonyms
- Rindgea cyda (Druce, 1893); Eubolia cyda Druce, 1893

= Frederickia cyda =

Species of moth

Frederickia cyda, the mesquite looper moth, is a species of moth in the family Geometridae. It is found in Central America and North America.
