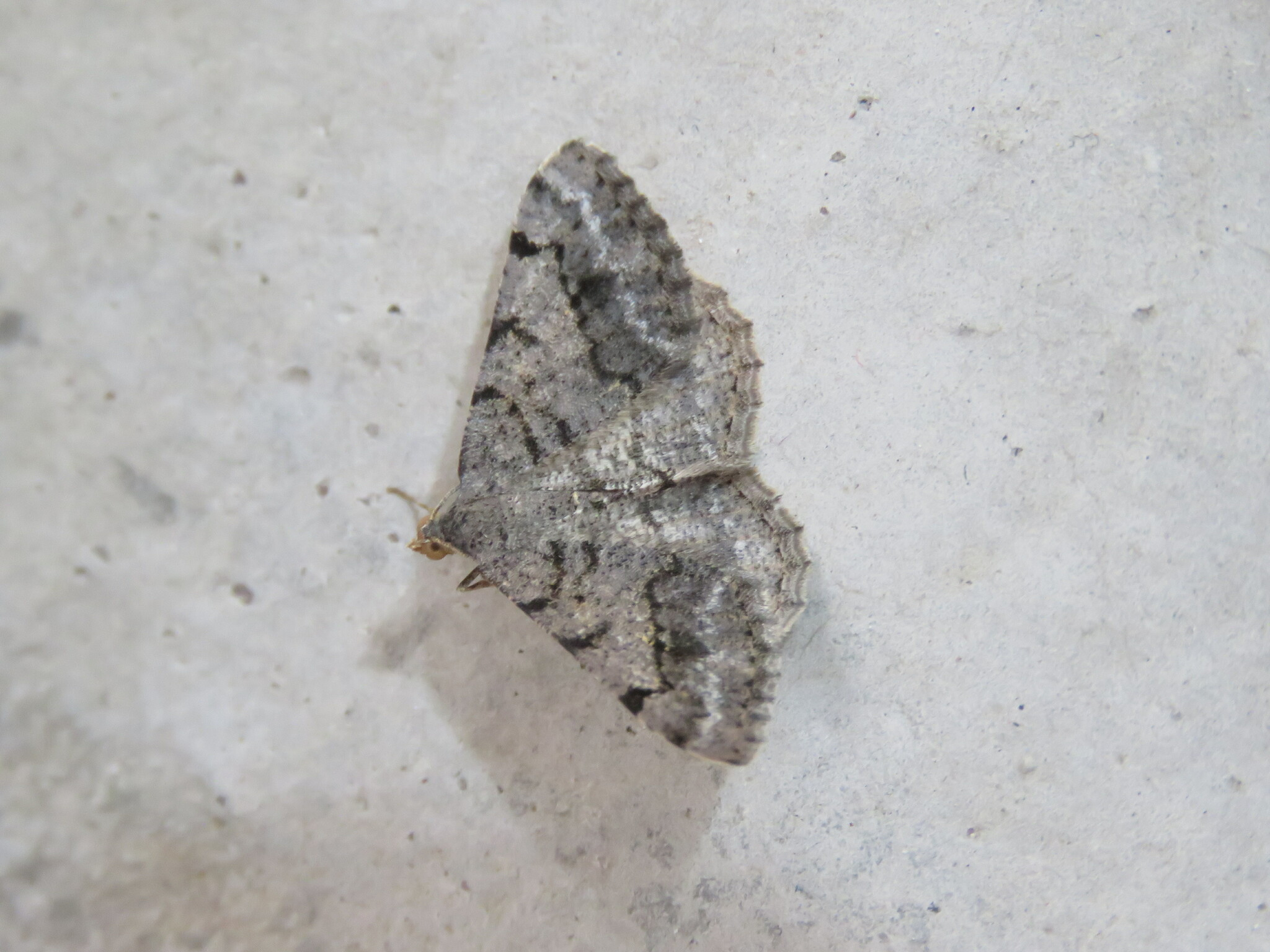
- Frederickia nigricomma, México

Scientific classification
- Kingdom: Animalia
- Phylum: Arthropoda
- Class: Insecta
- Order: Lepidoptera
- Family: Geometridae
- Tribe: Macariini
- Genus: Frederickia
- Species: F. nigricomma

Binomial name
- Frederickia nigricomma (Warren, 1904)

Synonyms
- Rindgea nigricomma (Warren, 1904); Semiothisa nigricomma Warren, 1904

= Frederickia nigricomma =

Species of moth

Frederickia nigricomma is a species of moth in the family Geometridae. It is found in Central America and North America.
