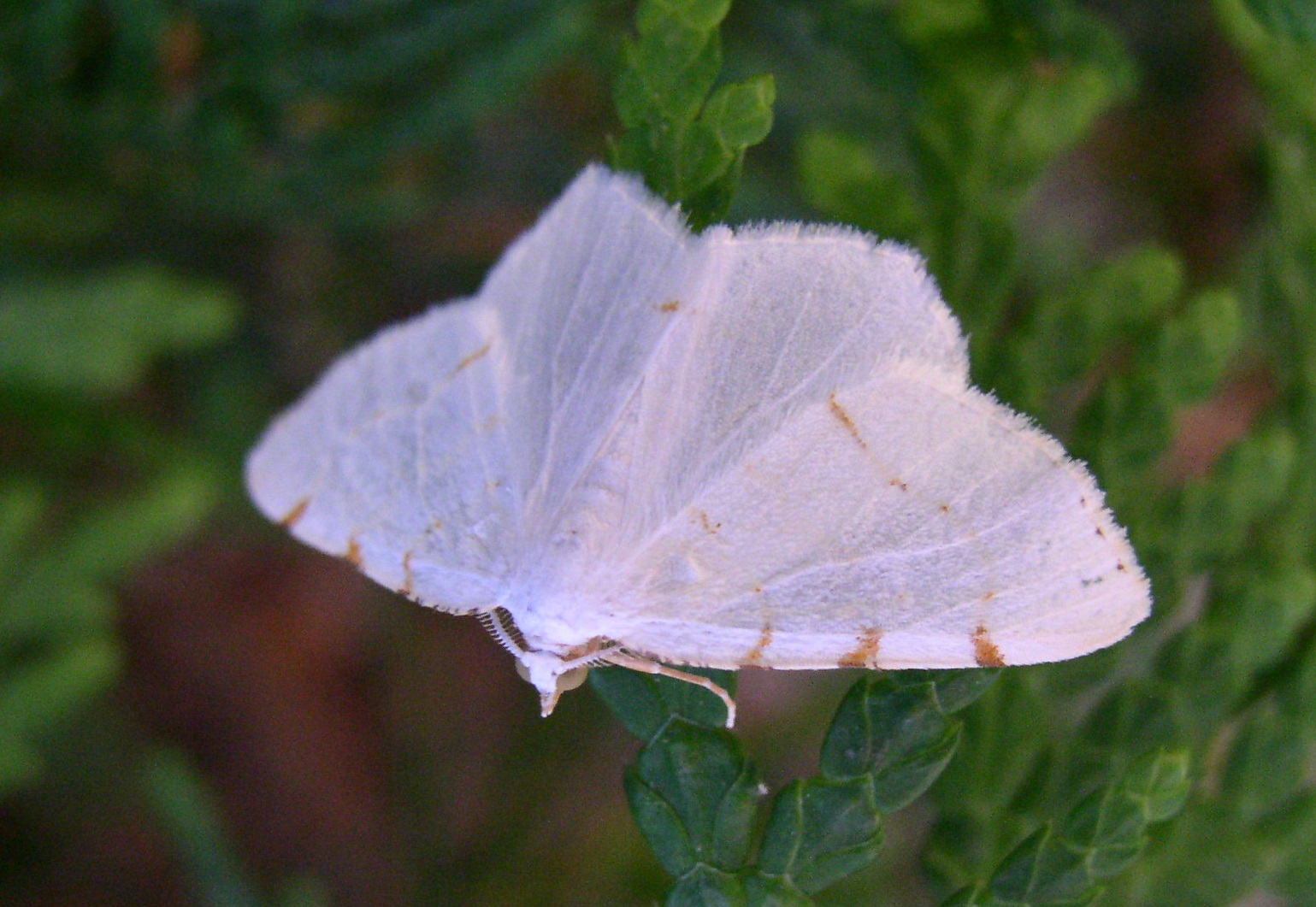
- Speranza pustularia – lesser maple spanworm moth

Scientific classification
- Kingdom: Animalia
- Phylum: Arthropoda
- Clade: Pancrustacea
- Class: Insecta
- Order: Lepidoptera
- Family: Geometridae
- Tribe: Macariini
- Genus: Speranza; Curtis, 1828

= Speranza (moth) =

Genus of moths

Speranza is a genus of moths in the family Geometridae erected by John Curtis in 1828.

== Species ==
The following species are classified in the genus. This species list may be incomplete.

- Speranza abruptata
- Speranza amboflava
- Speranza anataria
- Speranza andersoni
- Speranza argillacearia – mousy angle moth
- Speranza austrinata
- Speranza benigna
- Speranza bitactata – split-lined angle moth
- Speranza boreata
- Speranza brunneata
- Speranza colata
- Speranza coloradensis
- Speranza confederata
- Speranza coortaria – four-spotted angle moth
- Speranza deceptrix
- Speranza decorata
- Speranza denticulodes
- Speranza evagaria – drab angle moth
- Speranza exauspicata
- Speranza exonerata
- Speranza extemporata
- Speranza flavicaria
- Speranza graphidaria
- Speranza grossbecki
- Speranza guenearia
- Speranza helena
- Speranza hesperata
- Speranza inextricata
- Speranza loricaria
- Speranza lorquinaria – Lorquin's angle moth
- Speranza marcescaria
- Speranza occiduaria
- Speranza pallipennata
- Speranza perornata
- Speranza plumosata
- Speranza prunosata
- Speranza pustularia – lesser maple spanworm moth
- Speranza quadrilinearia
- Speranza ribearia – currant spanworm moth
- Speranza saphenata
- Speranza schatzeata
- Speranza semivolata
- Speranza simplex
- Speranza simpliciata
- Speranza subcessaria – barred angle moth
- Speranza sulphurea – sulphur angle moth
- Speranza trilinearia
- Speranza umbriferata
- Speranza varadaria – southern angle moth
- Speranza wauaria
