= Speranza inextricata =

Scientific classification
- Kingdom: Animalia
- Phylum: Arthropoda
- Clade: Pancrustacea
- Class: Insecta
- Order: Lepidoptera
- Family: Geometridae
- Tribe: Macariini
- Genus: Speranza
- Species: S. inextricata

Binomial name
- Speranza inextricata (Walker, 1861)

Synonyms
- Diastictis floridensis Hulst, 1898; Macaria inextricata Walker, 1861

Species of moth

Speranza inextricata is a species of geometrid moth in the family Geometridae. It is found in North America.

The MONA or Hodges number for Speranza inextricata is 6285.
