= Speranza varadaria =

Scientific classification
- Kingdom: Animalia
- Phylum: Arthropoda
- Clade: Pancrustacea
- Class: Insecta
- Order: Lepidoptera
- Family: Geometridae
- Tribe: Macariini
- Genus: Speranza
- Species: S. varadaria

Binomial name
- Speranza varadaria (Walker, 1860)

Synonyms
- Aspilates abbreviata Walker, 1863; Caberodes varadaria Walker, 1860; Macaria inaptata Walker, 1861

Species of moth

Speranza varadaria, the southern angle moth, is a species of moth in the family Geometridae. It is found in North America.

The MONA or Hodges number for Speranza varadaria is 6314.
