= Frederickia parcata =

Scientific classification
- Kingdom: Animalia
- Phylum: Arthropoda
- Class: Insecta
- Order: Lepidoptera
- Family: Geometridae
- Tribe: Macariini
- Genus: Frederickia
- Species: F. parcata

Binomial name
- Frederickia parcata (Grossbeck, 1908)

Synonyms
- Rindgea parcata (Grossbeck, 1908); Sciagraphia parcata Grossbeck, 1908

Species of moth

Frederickia disparcata is a species of moth in the family Geometridae. It is found in Central America and North America.
