= Speranza boreata =

Scientific classification
- Kingdom: Animalia
- Phylum: Arthropoda
- Clade: Pancrustacea
- Class: Insecta
- Order: Lepidoptera
- Family: Geometridae
- Tribe: Macariini
- Genus: Speranza
- Species: S. boreata

Binomial name
- Speranza boreata Ferguson, 2008

Species of moth

Speranza boreata is a species of geometrid moth in the family Geometridae. It is found in North America.

The MONA or Hodges number for Speranza boreata is 6287.1.
