= Speranza andersoni =

Scientific classification
- Kingdom: Animalia
- Phylum: Arthropoda
- Clade: Pancrustacea
- Class: Insecta
- Order: Lepidoptera
- Family: Geometridae
- Tribe: Macariini
- Genus: Speranza
- Species: S. andersoni

Binomial name
- Speranza andersoni (Swett, 1916)

Synonyms
- Diastictis andersoni Swett, 1916; Itame andersoni orientis Ferguson, 1953

Species of moth

Speranza andersoni is a species of geometrid moth in the family Geometridae. It is found in North America.
