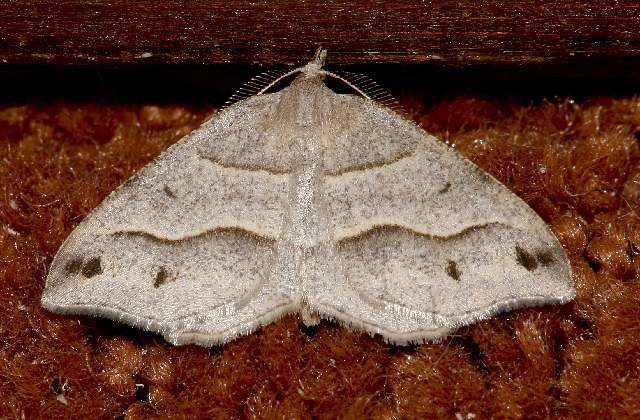

Scientific classification
- Kingdom: Animalia
- Phylum: Arthropoda
- Clade: Pancrustacea
- Class: Insecta
- Order: Lepidoptera
- Family: Geometridae
- Tribe: Macariini
- Genus: Speranza
- Species: S. lorquinaria

Binomial name
- Speranza lorquinaria (Guenée in Boisduval & Guenée, 1858)

Synonyms
- Tephrina lorquinaria Guenée in Boisduval and Guenée, 1858

= Speranza lorquinaria =

Species of moth

Speranza lorquinaria, or Lorquin's angle, is a species of geometrid moth in the family Geometridae. It is found in North America.

The MONA or Hodges number for Speranza lorquinaria is 6324.

== Synonyms ==
- Tephrina lorquinaria (Guenée, 1858)
- Halia tripunctaria (Packard, 1873)
- Macaria lorquinaria (Guenée, 1858)

== Host Plants ==
The larvae feed on Red Alder and Willow and other plants in the families Betulaceae, Pinaceae and Salicaceae.

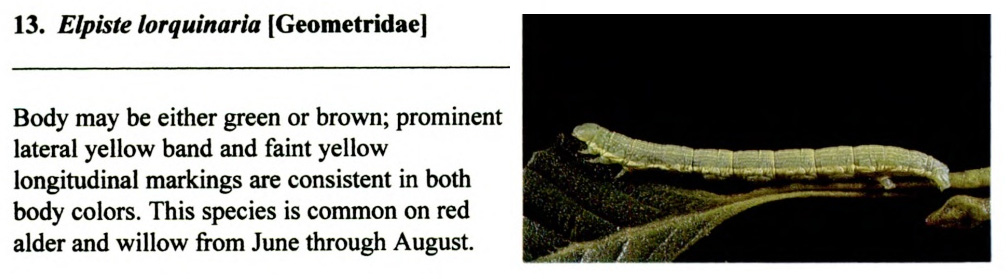
Macaria lorquinaria caterpillar
