= Frederickia maricopa =

Scientific classification
- Kingdom: Animalia
- Phylum: Arthropoda
- Class: Insecta
- Order: Lepidoptera
- Family: Geometridae
- Tribe: Macariini
- Genus: Frederickia
- Species: F. maricopa

Binomial name
- Frederickia maricopa (Hulst, 1898)

Synonyms
- Rindgea maricopa (Hulst, 1898); Diastictis maricopa Hulst, 1898; Semiothisa sirenata McDunnough, 1939

Species of moth

Frederickia maricopa is a species of moth in the family Geometridae. It is found in Central America and North America.
