= Speranza helena =

Scientific classification
- Kingdom: Animalia
- Phylum: Arthropoda
- Clade: Pancrustacea
- Class: Insecta
- Order: Lepidoptera
- Family: Geometridae
- Tribe: Macariini
- Genus: Speranza
- Species: S. helena

Binomial name
- Speranza helena (Cassino, 1928)

Synonyms
- Itame helena Cassino, 1928

Species of moth

Speranza helena is a species of geometrid moth in the family Geometridae. It is found in North America.

The MONA or Hodges number for Speranza helena is 6277.
