= Speranza marcescaria =

Scientific classification
- Kingdom: Animalia
- Phylum: Arthropoda
- Clade: Pancrustacea
- Class: Insecta
- Order: Lepidoptera
- Family: Geometridae
- Tribe: Macariini
- Genus: Speranza
- Species: S. marcescaria

Binomial name
- Speranza marcescaria (Guenée in Boisduval & Guenée, 1858)

Synonyms
- Halia cineraria Packard, 1871; Halia marcescaria Guenée in Boisduval and Guenée, 1858

Species of moth

Speranza marcescaria is a species of geometrid moth in the family Geometridae. It is found in Central America and North America.

The MONA or Hodges number for Speranza marcescaria is 6323.
