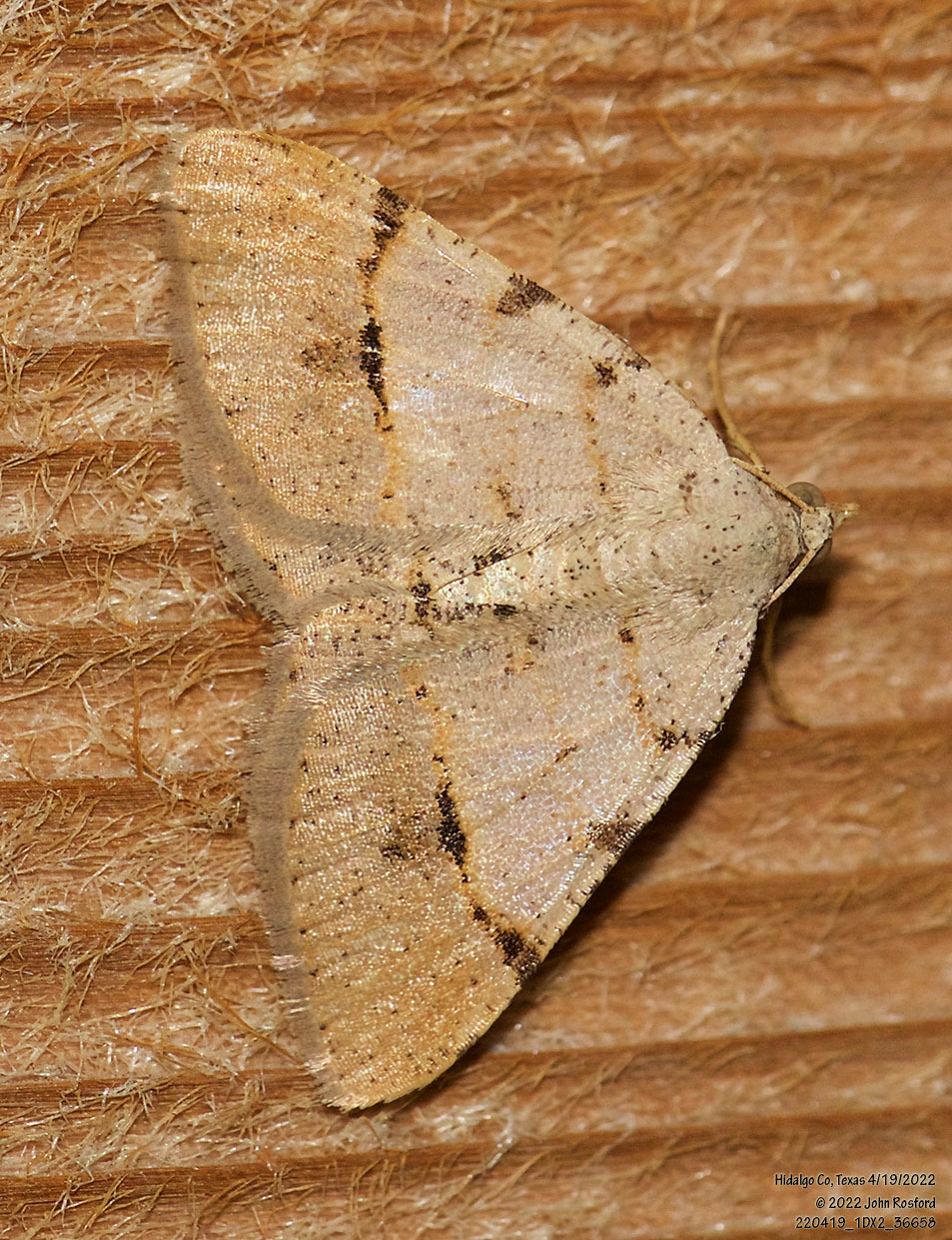
- Frederickia flaviterminata, Texas

Scientific classification
- Kingdom: Animalia
- Phylum: Arthropoda
- Class: Insecta
- Order: Lepidoptera
- Family: Geometridae
- Subfamily: Ennominae
- Tribe: Macariini
- Genus: Frederickia
- Species: F. flaviterminata

Binomial name
- Frederickia flaviterminata (Barnes & McDunnough, 1913)

Synonyms
- Rindgea flaviterminata (Barnes & McDunnough, 1913)

= Frederickia flaviterminata =

Species of moth

Frederickia flaviterminata is a species of moth in the family Geometridae, first described by William Barnes and James Halliday McDunnough in 1913. It is found in south Texas and Mexico.
