= Speranza amboflava =

Scientific classification
- Kingdom: Animalia
- Phylum: Arthropoda
- Clade: Pancrustacea
- Class: Insecta
- Order: Lepidoptera
- Family: Geometridae
- Tribe: Macariini
- Genus: Speranza
- Species: S. amboflava

Binomial name
- Speranza amboflava (Ferguson, 1953)

Synonyms
- Itame sulphurea amboflava Ferguson, 1953

Species of moth

Speranza amboflava is a species of geometrid moth in the family Geometridae.

The MONA or Hodges number for Speranza amboflava is 6284.
