= Speranza schatzeata =

Scientific classification
- Kingdom: Animalia
- Phylum: Arthropoda
- Clade: Pancrustacea
- Class: Insecta
- Order: Lepidoptera
- Family: Geometridae
- Tribe: Macariini
- Genus: Speranza
- Species: S. schatzeata

Binomial name
- Speranza schatzeata (Cassino, 1927)

Synonyms
- Itame minata Cassino, 1928; Itame schatzeata Cassino, 1927

Species of moth

Speranza schatzeata is a species of geometrid moth in the family Geometridae.

The MONA or Hodges number for Speranza schatzeata is 6310.
