= Frederickia prolificata =

Scientific classification
- Kingdom: Animalia
- Phylum: Arthropoda
- Class: Insecta
- Order: Lepidoptera
- Family: Geometridae
- Tribe: Macariini
- Genus: Frederickia
- Species: F. prolificata

Binomial name
- Frederickia prolificata Ferguson, 2008

Synonyms
- Rindgea prolificata Ferguson, 2008

Species of moth

Frederickia prolificata is a species of geometrid moth in the family Geometridae. It is found in North America.
