= Frederickia ballandrata =

Scientific classification
- Kingdom: Animalia
- Phylum: Arthropoda
- Class: Insecta
- Order: Lepidoptera
- Family: Geometridae
- Subfamily: Ennominae
- Tribe: Macariini
- Genus: Frederickia
- Species: F. ballandrata

Binomial name
- Frederickia ballandrata (W. S. Wright, 1923)

Synonyms
- Rindgea ballandrata (W. S. Wright, 1923); Phasiane s-signata ballandrata W.S.Wright, 1923; Semiothisa ballandrata (W.S.Wright, 1923); Semiothisa melanderi Sperry, 1948

Species of moth

Frederickia ballandrata is a species of moth in the family Geometridae, found in North and Central America
