= Speranza evagaria =

Scientific classification
- Kingdom: Animalia
- Phylum: Arthropoda
- Clade: Pancrustacea
- Class: Insecta
- Order: Lepidoptera
- Family: Geometridae
- Genus: Speranza
- Species: S. evagaria

Binomial name
- Speranza evagaria (Hulst, 1900)

Synonyms
- Cymatophora evagaria Hulst, 1900

Species of moth

Speranza evagaria, the drab angle moth, is a species of geometrid moth in the family Geometridae. It is found in North America.

The MONA or Hodges number for Speranza evagaria is 6278.
