= Speranza austrinata =

Scientific classification
- Kingdom: Animalia
- Phylum: Arthropoda
- Clade: Pancrustacea
- Class: Insecta
- Order: Lepidoptera
- Family: Geometridae
- Genus: Speranza
- Species: S. austrinata

Binomial name
- Speranza austrinata Ferguson, 2008

Species of moth

Speranza austrinata is a species of geometrid moth in the family Geometridae. It was described by Douglas C. Ferguson in 2008 and is found in Central and North America.

The MONA or Hodges number for Speranza austrinata is 6301.1.
