= Speranza pallipennata =

Scientific classification
- Kingdom: Animalia
- Phylum: Arthropoda
- Clade: Pancrustacea
- Class: Insecta
- Order: Lepidoptera
- Family: Geometridae
- Genus: Speranza
- Species: S. pallipennata

Binomial name
- Speranza pallipennata (Barnes & McDunnough, 1912)

Synonyms
- Diastictis pallipennata Barnes & McDunnough, 1912

Species of moth

Speranza pallipennata is a species of moth in the family Geometridae, first described by William Barnes and James Halliday McDunnough, which is found in North America.

The MONA (short for Moths of North America) or Hodges (identification) number for Speranza pallipennata, is 6317.
