= Speranza simpliciata =

Scientific classification
- Kingdom: Animalia
- Phylum: Arthropoda
- Clade: Pancrustacea
- Class: Insecta
- Order: Lepidoptera
- Family: Geometridae
- Genus: Speranza
- Species: S. simpliciata

Binomial name
- Speranza simpliciata (Barnes & McDunnough, 1918)

Synonyms
- Itame simpliciata Barnes & McDunnough, 1918

Species of moth

Speranza simpliciata is a species of moth in the family Geometridae. It was first described by William Barnes and James Halliday McDunnough in 1918. It is found in North America.
