= Speranza exonerata =

Scientific classification
- Kingdom: Animalia
- Phylum: Arthropoda
- Clade: Pancrustacea
- Class: Insecta
- Order: Lepidoptera
- Family: Geometridae
- Genus: Speranza
- Species: S. exonerata

Binomial name
- Speranza exonerata Ferguson, 2008

Species of moth

Speranza exonerata, the barrens itame, is a moth of the family Geometridae described by Douglas C. Ferguson in 2008. It is found in Massachusetts, New Hampshire, Pennsylvania and New Jersey. It is listed as threatened in the US state of Connecticut.

The only documented larval food plant of this species is Quercus ilicifolia, though it is possible that it might use Vaccinium species, particularly Vaccinium angustifolium.
