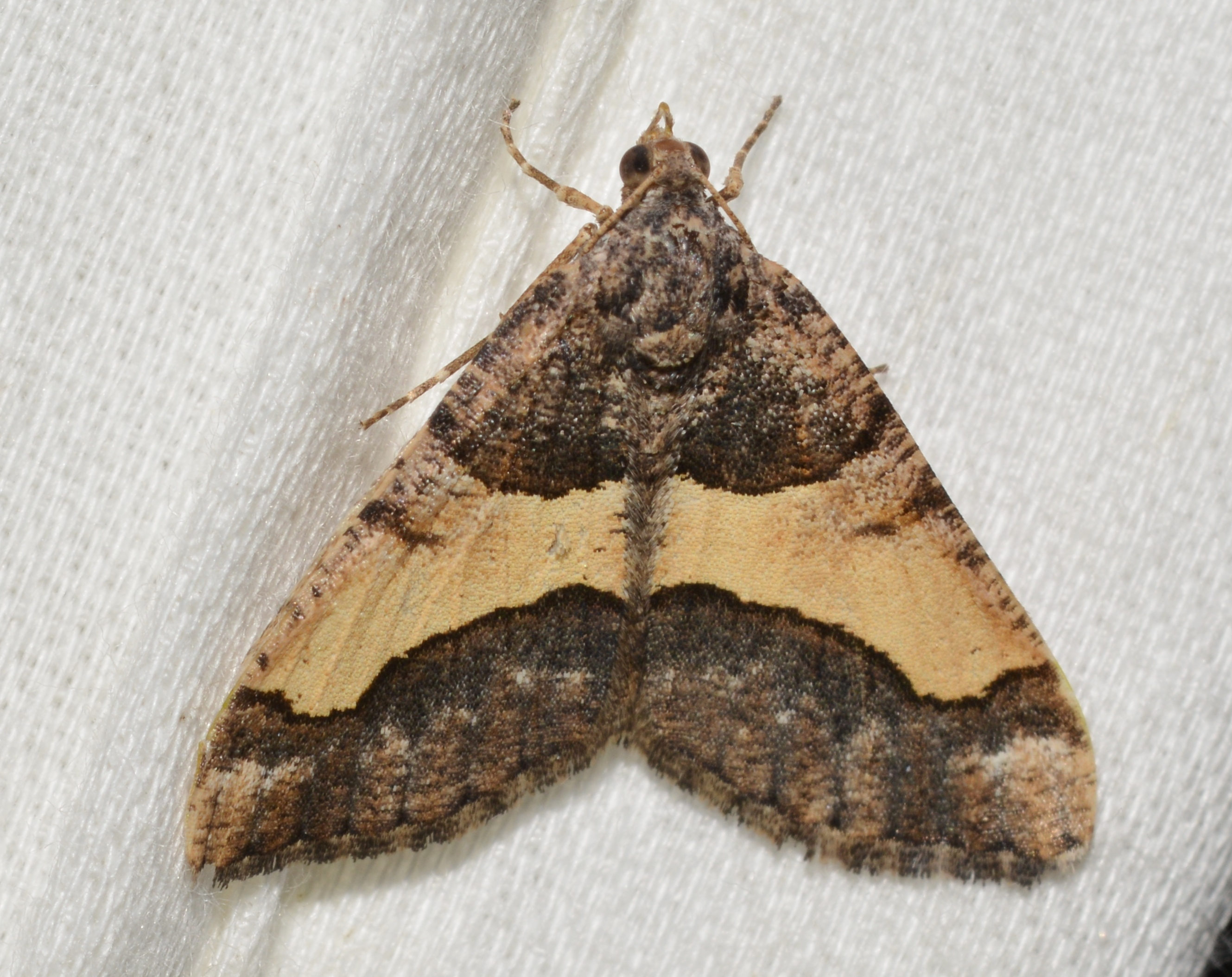

Scientific classification
- Kingdom: Animalia
- Phylum: Arthropoda
- Class: Insecta
- Order: Lepidoptera
- Family: Geometridae
- Genus: Frederickia
- Species: F. hypaethrata

Binomial name
- Frederickia hypaethrata (Grote, 1881)

Synonyms
- Rindgea hypaethrata (Grote, 1881); Phasiane hypaethrata Grote, 1881

= Frederickia hypaethrata =

Species of moth

Frederickia hypaethrata is a species of moth in the family Geometridae. It is found in Central America and North America.
