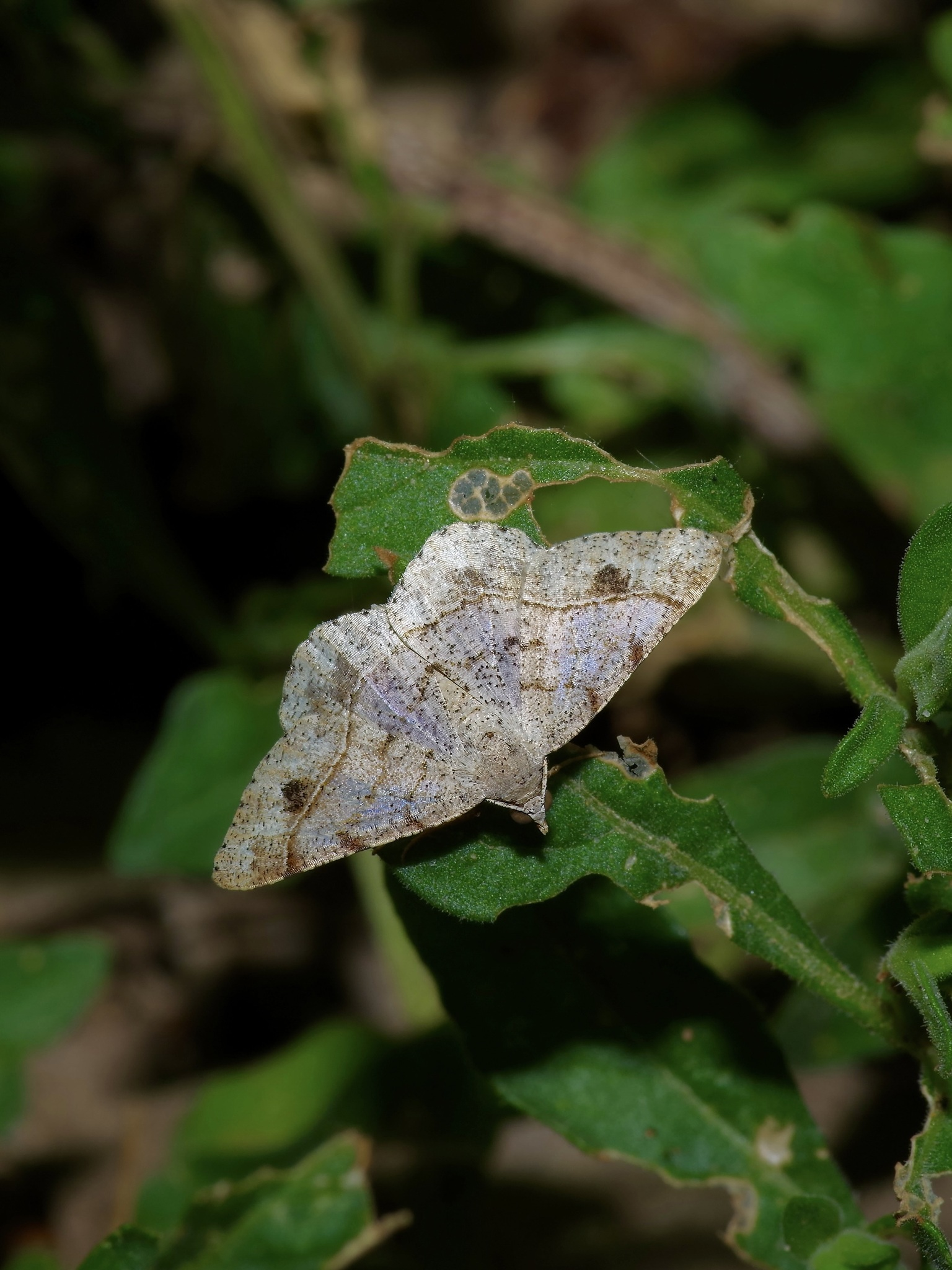
- Frederickia subterminata, Texas

Scientific classification
- Kingdom: Animalia
- Phylum: Arthropoda
- Class: Insecta
- Order: Lepidoptera
- Family: Geometridae
- Genus: Frederickia
- Species: F. subterminata

Binomial name
- Frederickia subterminata (Barnes & McDunnough, 1913)

Synonyms
- Rindgea subterminata (Barnes & McDunnough, 1913); Macaria subterminata Barnes & McDunnough, 1913

= Frederickia subterminata =

Species of moth

Frederickia subterminata is a species of moth in the family Geometridae first described by William Barnes and James Halliday McDunnough in 1913. It is found in North America.
