= Speranza guenearia =

Scientific classification
- Kingdom: Animalia
- Phylum: Arthropoda
- Clade: Pancrustacea
- Class: Insecta
- Order: Lepidoptera
- Family: Geometridae
- Genus: Speranza
- Species: S. guenearia

Binomial name
- Speranza guenearia (Packard, 1876)

Synonyms
- Thamnonoma guenearia Packard, 1876

Species of moth

Speranza guenearia is a species of geometrid moth in the family Geometridae. It is found in North America.

The MONA or Hodges number for Speranza guenearia is 6301.
