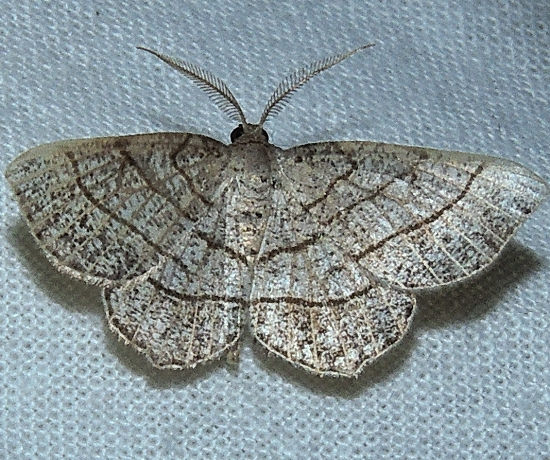

Scientific classification
- Kingdom: Animalia
- Phylum: Arthropoda
- Clade: Pancrustacea
- Class: Insecta
- Order: Lepidoptera
- Family: Geometridae
- Tribe: Macariini
- Genus: Eumacaria; Packard, 1873
- Species: E. madopata

Binomial name
- Eumacaria madopata (Guenée, 1857)

Synonyms
- Macaria madopata Guenée, 1857; Macaria latiferrugata Walker, [1863]; Eumacaria brunneata Packard, 1873

= Eumacaria =

Genus of moths

Eumacaria is a monotypic moth genus in the family Geometridae described by Packard in 1873. Its only species, Eumacaria madopata, the brown-bordered geometer moth, was first described by Achille Guenée in 1857. It is found in North America, where it has been recorded from British Columbia, northern Washington, southern Saskatchewan, from Maine to Florida, South Dakota, North Dakota, Nebraska, Wyoming, Idaho, Colorado and New Mexico. The habitat consists of orchards and shrublands. The species is listed as threatened in Connecticut.

The wingspan is 20–25 mm. Adults are on wing from early June to early July in the north and from April to September in the south. There is one generation per year.

The larvae feed on Prunus species (including Prunus pensylvanica and Prunus serotina) as well as Pyrus.
