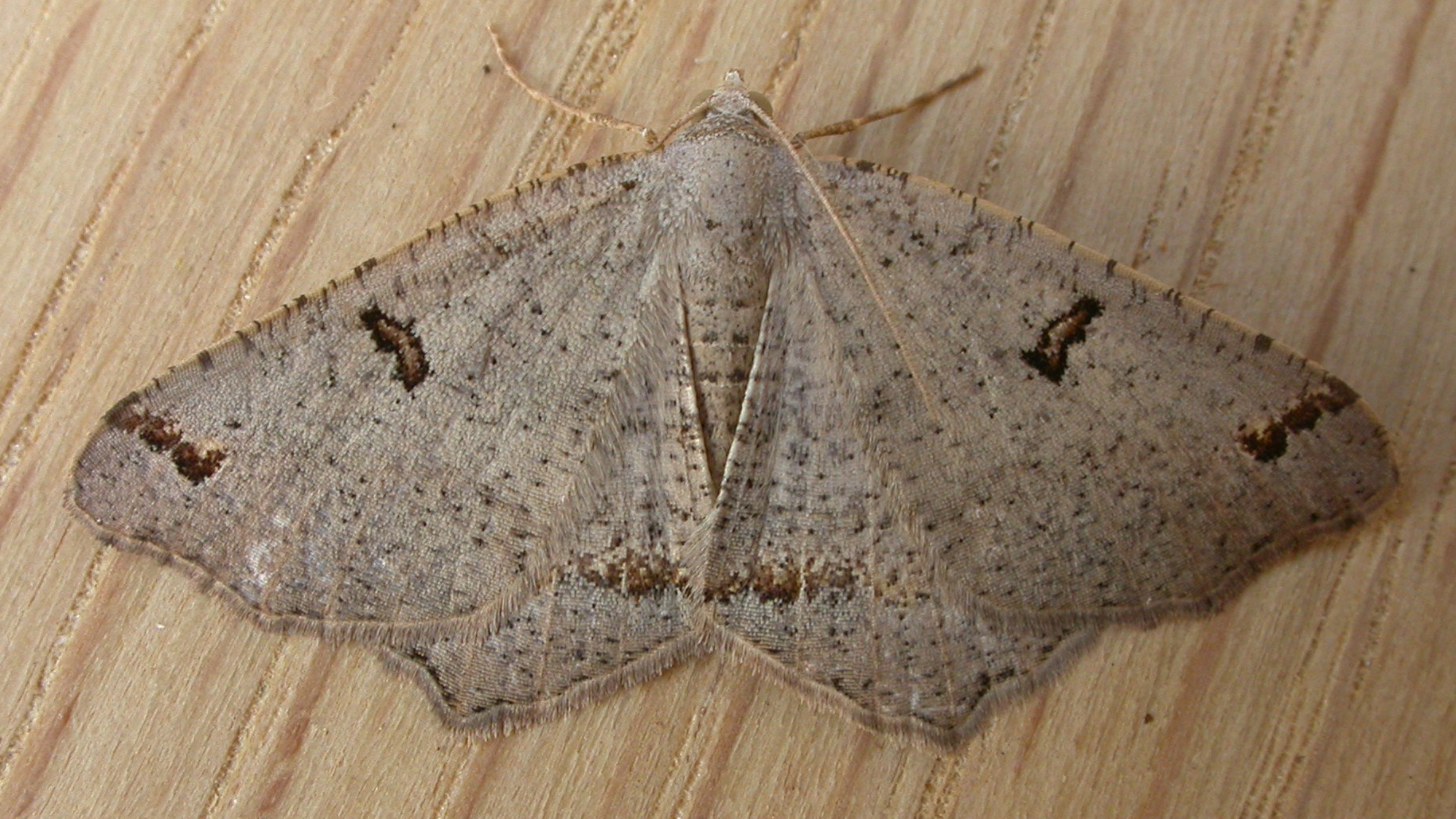
- Dissomorphia australiaria

Scientific classification
- Kingdom: Animalia
- Phylum: Arthropoda
- Clade: Pancrustacea
- Class: Insecta
- Order: Lepidoptera
- Family: Geometridae
- Tribe: Macariini
- Genus: Dissomorphia; Warren, 1894

= Dissomorphia =

Genus of moths

Dissomorphia is a genus of moths in the family Geometridae.

== Species ==
- Dissomorphia australiaria (Guenée, 1857)
