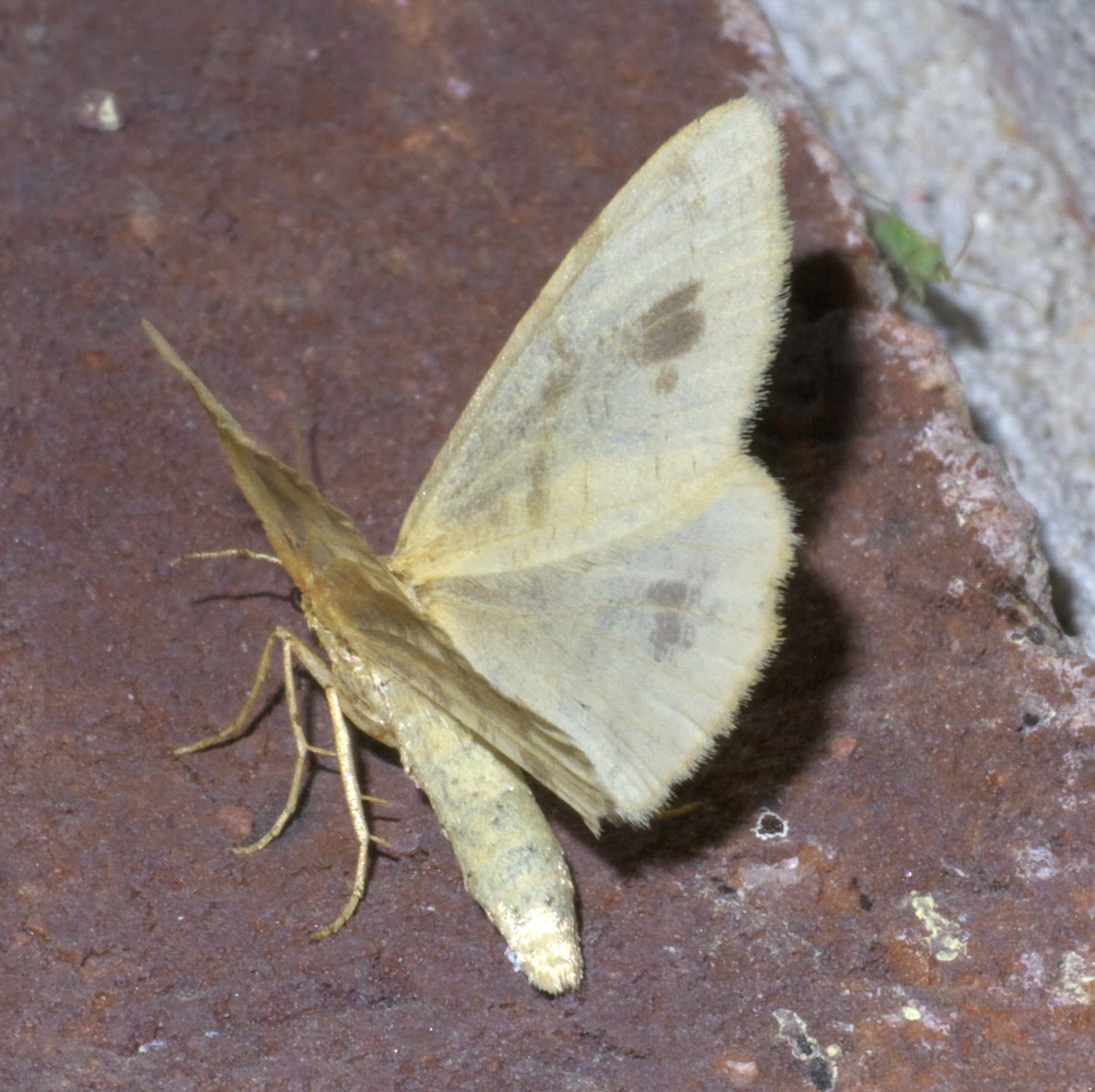

Scientific classification
- Domain: Eukaryota
- Kingdom: Animalia
- Phylum: Arthropoda
- Class: Insecta
- Order: Lepidoptera
- Family: Geometridae
- Tribe: Macariini
- Genus: Macaria
- Species: M. ribearia

Binomial name
- Macaria ribearia (Fitch, 1848)

Synonyms
- Abraxas ribearia Fitch, 1848; Aspilates sigmaria Guenée in Boisduval and Guenée, 1858; Ellopia aniusaria Walker in DUrban, 1860; Ellopia annisaria Walker, 1863; Thamnonoma fascioferaria Hulst, 1887

= Macaria ribearia =

Species of moth

Macaria ribearia, the currant spanworm, is a species of geometrid moth in the family Geometridae. It is found in North America.

The MONA or Hodges number for Macaria ribearia is 6274.

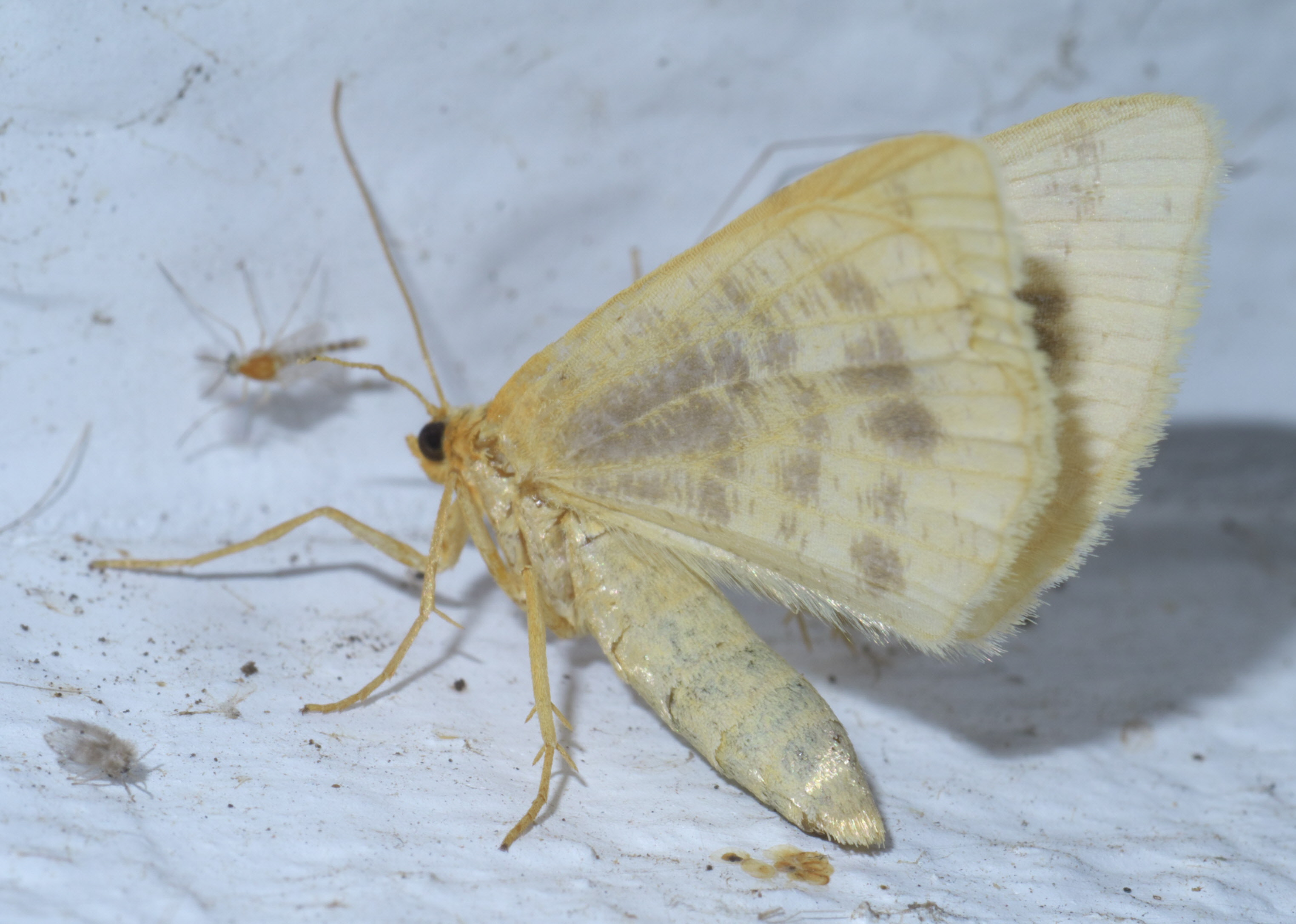
Currant spanworm, Macaria ribearia
