= Platypepla =

Scientific classification
- Kingdom: Animalia
- Phylum: Arthropoda
- Class: Insecta
- Order: Lepidoptera
- Family: Geometridae
- Tribe: Macariini
- Genus: Platypepla; Warren, 1900

Genus of moths

Platypepla is a genus of moths in the family Geometridae.

== Species ==
- Platypepla arabella Wiltshire, 1983
- Platypepla bifida Herbulot, 1984
- Platypepla spurcata (Warren, 1897)
