= Speranza confederata =

Scientific classification
- Kingdom: Animalia
- Phylum: Arthropoda
- Clade: Pancrustacea
- Class: Insecta
- Order: Lepidoptera
- Family: Geometridae
- Genus: Speranza
- Species: S. confederata

Binomial name
- Speranza confederata (Barnes & McDunnough, 1917)

Species of moth

Speranza confederata is a species of moth in the family Geometridae first described by William Barnes and James Halliday McDunnough in 1917. It is found in North America.

The MONA or Hodges number for Speranza confederata is 6295.
