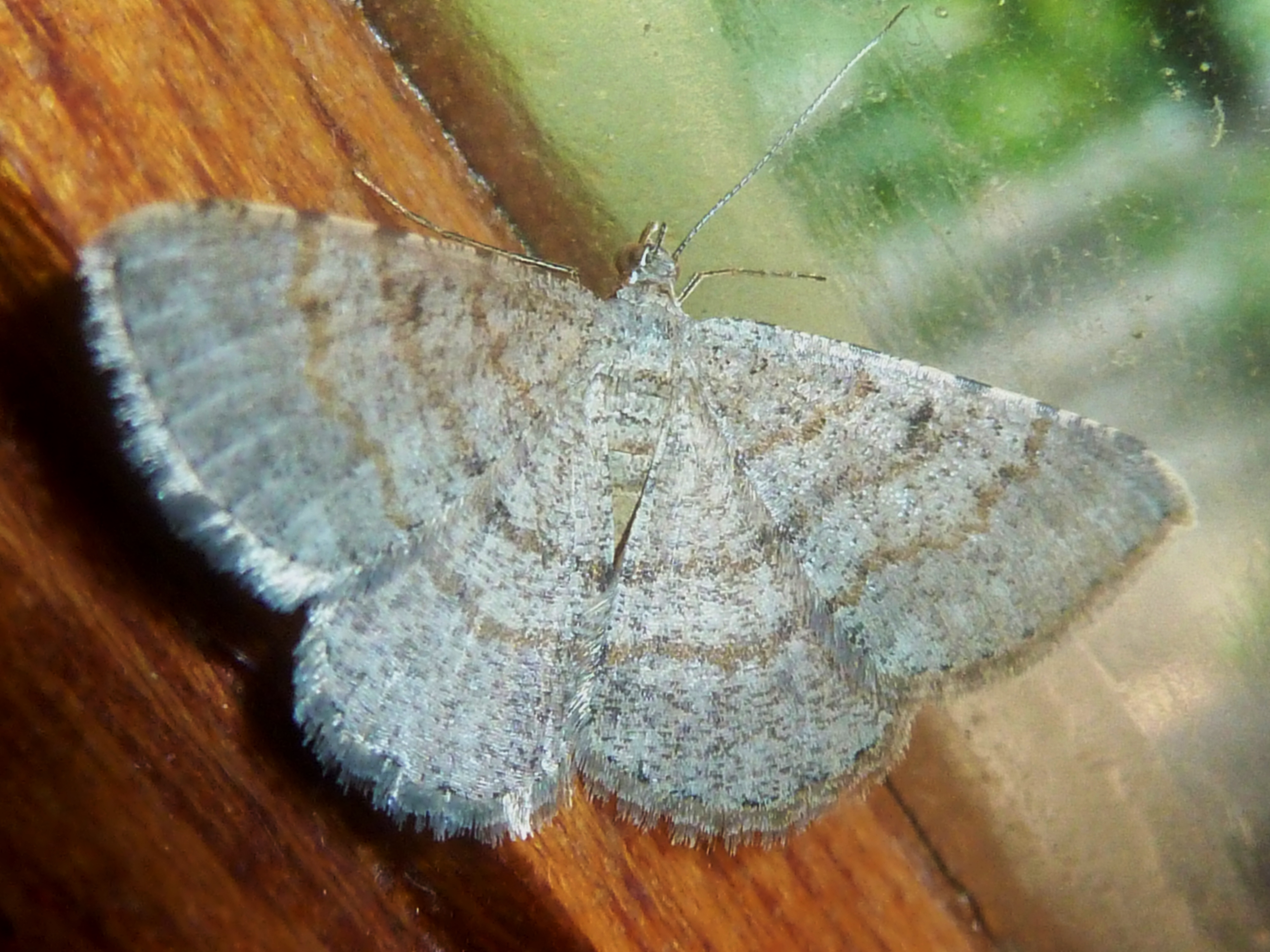
- Female Acanthovalva inconspicuaria

Scientific classification
- Kingdom: Animalia
- Phylum: Arthropoda
- Clade: Pancrustacea
- Class: Insecta
- Order: Lepidoptera
- Family: Geometridae
- Tribe: Macariini
- Genus: Acanthovalva; Krüger, 2001

Type species
- Aphilopota inconspicuaria (Hübner, 1819)

= Acanthovalva =

Genus of moths

Acanthovalva is a genus of moths in the family Geometridae described by Martin Krüger in 2001.

== Species ==
Some species of this genus are:

- Acanthovalva bilineata (Warren, 1895)
- Acanthovalva capensis Krüger, 2001
- Acanthovalva focularia (Geyer, 1837)
- Acanthovalva inconspicuaria (Hübner, 1819)
- Acanthovalva itremo Krüger, 2001
- Acanthovalva magna Krüger, 2001
