= Speranza semivolata =

Scientific classification
- Kingdom: Animalia
- Phylum: Arthropoda
- Clade: Pancrustacea
- Class: Insecta
- Order: Lepidoptera
- Family: Geometridae
- Genus: Speranza
- Species: S. semivolata

Binomial name
- Speranza semivolata (Dyar, 1923)

Synonyms
- Phasiane semivolata Dyar, 1923

Species of moth

Speranza semivolata is a species of geometrid moth in the family Geometridae. It is found in North America.

The MONA or Hodges number for Speranza semivolata is 6291.
