= Speranza subcessaria =

Scientific classification
- Kingdom: Animalia
- Phylum: Arthropoda
- Clade: Pancrustacea
- Class: Insecta
- Order: Lepidoptera
- Family: Geometridae
- Genus: Speranza
- Species: S. subcessaria

Binomial name
- Speranza subcessaria (Walker, 1861)

Synonyms
- Halia subcessaria Walker, 1861

Species of moth

Speranza subcessaria, the barred speranza, is a species of geometrid moth in the family Geometridae. It is found in North America.

The MONA or Hodges number for Speranza subcessaria is 6303.
