= Speranza deceptrix =

Scientific classification
- Kingdom: Animalia
- Phylum: Arthropoda
- Clade: Pancrustacea
- Class: Insecta
- Order: Lepidoptera
- Family: Geometridae
- Genus: Speranza
- Species: S. deceptrix

Binomial name
- Speranza deceptrix (Dyar, 1913)

Synonyms
- Macaria sobriaria (Barnes & McDunnough, 1917); Sciagraphia deceptrix Dyar, 1913

Species of moth

Speranza deceptrix is a species of moth in the family Geometridae first described by Harrison Gray Dyar Jr. in 1913. It is found in Central and North America.

The MONA or Hodges number for Speranza deceptrix is 6312.
