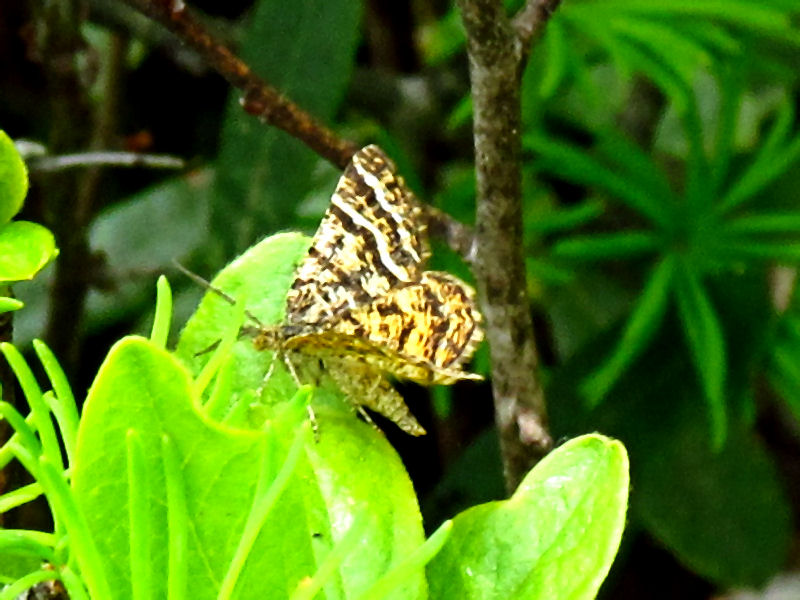
- Epelis truncataria, Alfred Bog, Ontario

Scientific classification
- Kingdom: Animalia
- Phylum: Arthropoda
- Class: Insecta
- Order: Lepidoptera
- Family: Geometridae
- Tribe: Macariini
- Genus: Epelis; Hulst, 1896

= Epelis =

Genus of moths

Epelis is a genus of moths in the family Geometridae found in Canada and the United States.

== Species ==
- Epelis truncataria (Walker, 1862) – black-banded orange
