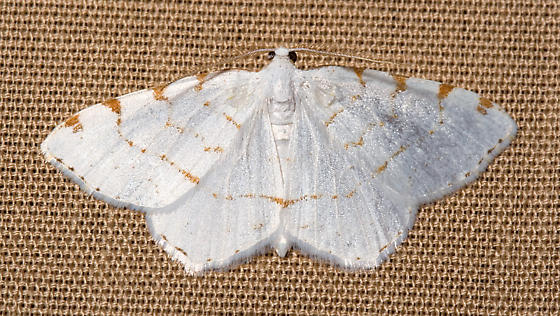

Scientific classification
- Kingdom: Animalia
- Phylum: Arthropoda
- Clade: Pancrustacea
- Class: Insecta
- Order: Lepidoptera
- Family: Geometridae
- Genus: Speranza
- Species: S. pustularia

Binomial name
- Speranza pustularia (Guenée, 1857)

Synonyms
- Stegania pustularia Guenée, 1857; Macaria pustularia (Guenée, 1857); Itame pustularia (Guenée, 1857)

= Speranza pustularia =

Species of moth

Speranza pustularia, the lesser maple spanworm, is a moth of the family Geometridae native to North America. Adults are on wing from May to July in the south and from June to August in the north. There is one generation per year.

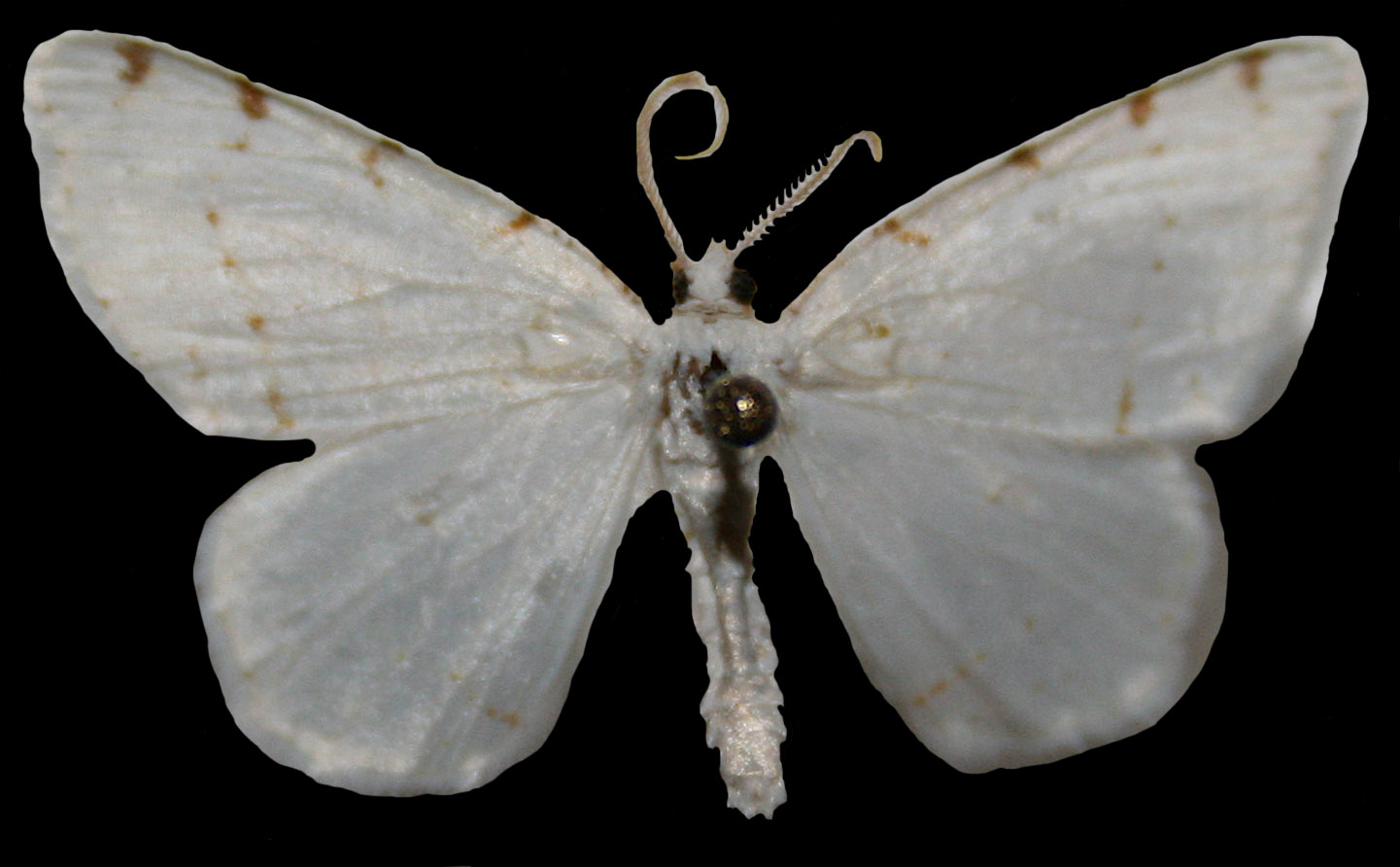

== Description ==
Adults have white wings with wavy orange-yellow lines across both the forewings and hindwings. These lines are often thicker at the top-most edge of the forewing. The wingspan is 18–27 mm.

== Range and habitat ==
The lesser maple spanworm is found from Nova Scotia to Florida, west to Mississippi, north to North Dakota and Saskatchewan. They are most common in deciduous and mixed forests.

== Ecology ==
The larvae feed on the leaves of maple, especially Acer rubrum. While A. rubrum is their primary food source, they may also feed on Acer saccharum and Acer saccharinum. Some have also been recorded on birch, cherry, poplar, Abies, Tsuga and tamarack.
