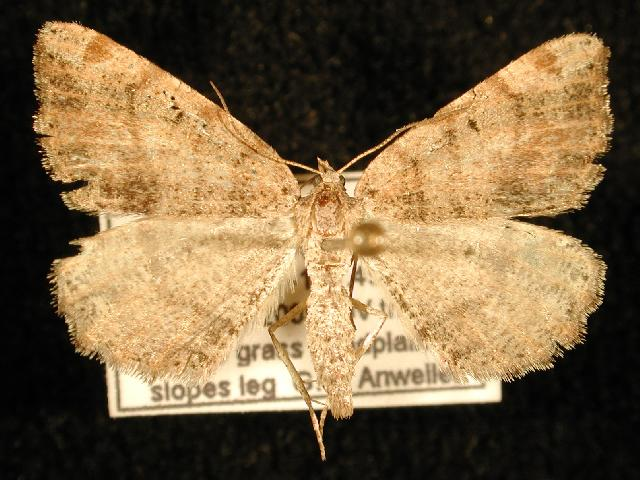

Scientific classification
- Kingdom: Animalia
- Phylum: Arthropoda
- Clade: Pancrustacea
- Class: Insecta
- Order: Lepidoptera
- Family: Geometridae
- Genus: Speranza
- Species: S. exauspicata

Binomial name
- Speranza exauspicata (Walker, 1861)

Synonyms
- Macaria exauspicata Walker, 1861

= Speranza exauspicata =

Species of moth

Speranza exauspicata is a species of geometrid moth in the family Geometridae. It is found in North America.
