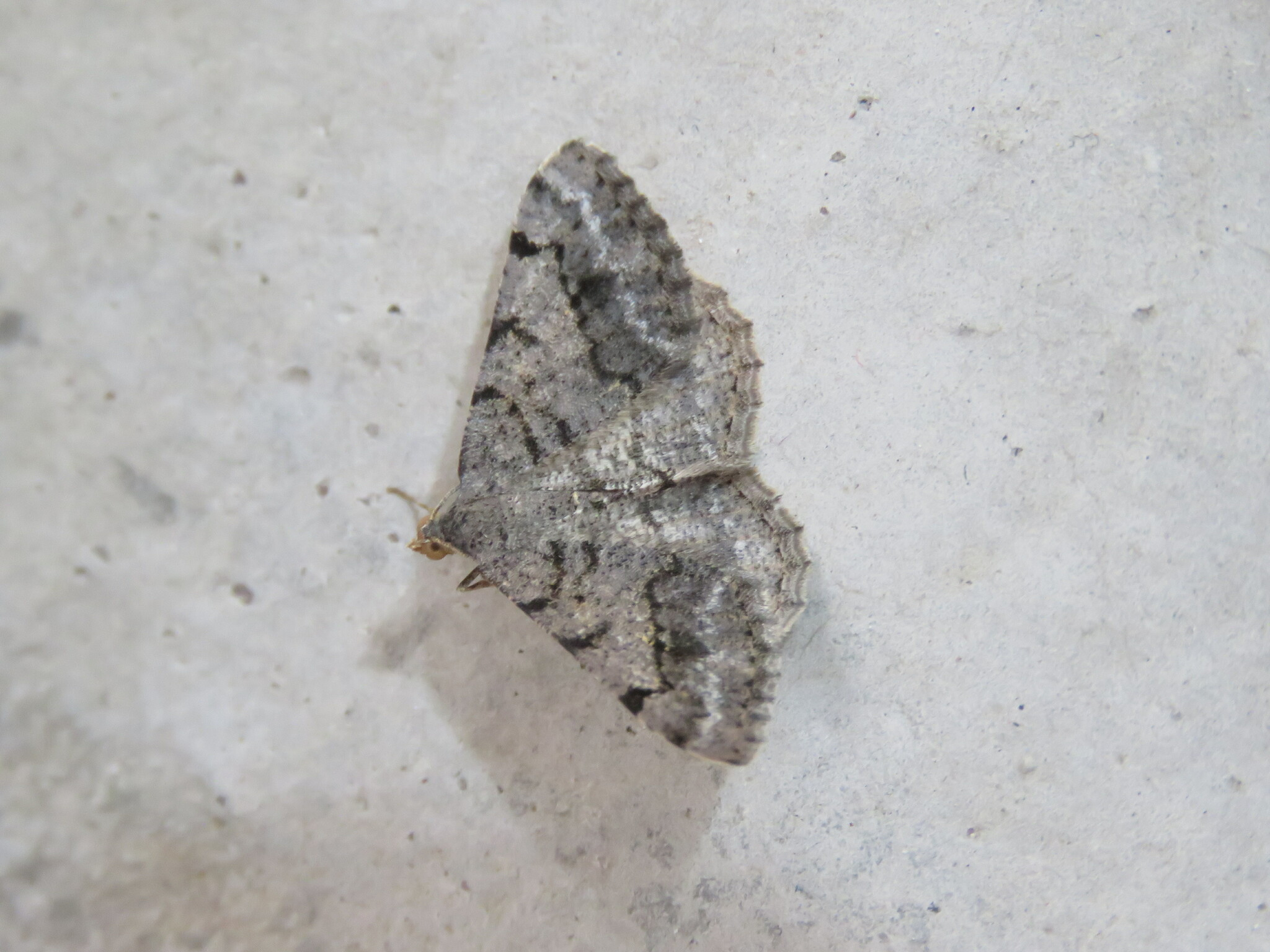
- Frederickia nigricomma, México

Scientific classification
- Kingdom: Animalia
- Phylum: Arthropoda
- Clade: Pancrustacea
- Class: Insecta
- Order: Lepidoptera
- Family: Geometridae
- Subfamily: Ennominae
- Tribe: Macariini
- Genus: Frederickia; Ferguson, 2008

Synonyms
- Rindgea Ferguson, 2008; Rindgea Johnson, 1993

= Frederickia =

Genus of moths

Frederickia is a genus of moths in the family Geometridae described by Alexander Douglas Campbell Ferguson in 2008.

== Species ==
These 14 species belong to the genus Frederickia:

- Frederickia ballandrata (W. S. Wright, 1923)
- Frederickia cyda (Druce, 1893) (mesquite looper moth)
- Frederickia disparcata (Ferguson, 2008)
- Frederickia flaviterminata (Barnes & McDunnough, 1913)
- Frederickia hypaethrata (Grote, 1881)
- Frederickia indeterminata (McDunnough, 1939)
- Frederickia maricopa (Hulst, 1898)
- Frederickia nigricomma (Warren, 1904)
- Frederickia parcata (Grossbeck, 1908)
- Frederickia piccoloi (Rindge, 1976)
- Frederickia prolificata (Ferguson, 2008)
- Frederickia s-signata (Packard, 1873) (signate looper moth)
- Frederickia stipularia (Barnes & McDunnough, 1913)
- Frederickia subterminata (Barnes & McDunnough, 1913)
