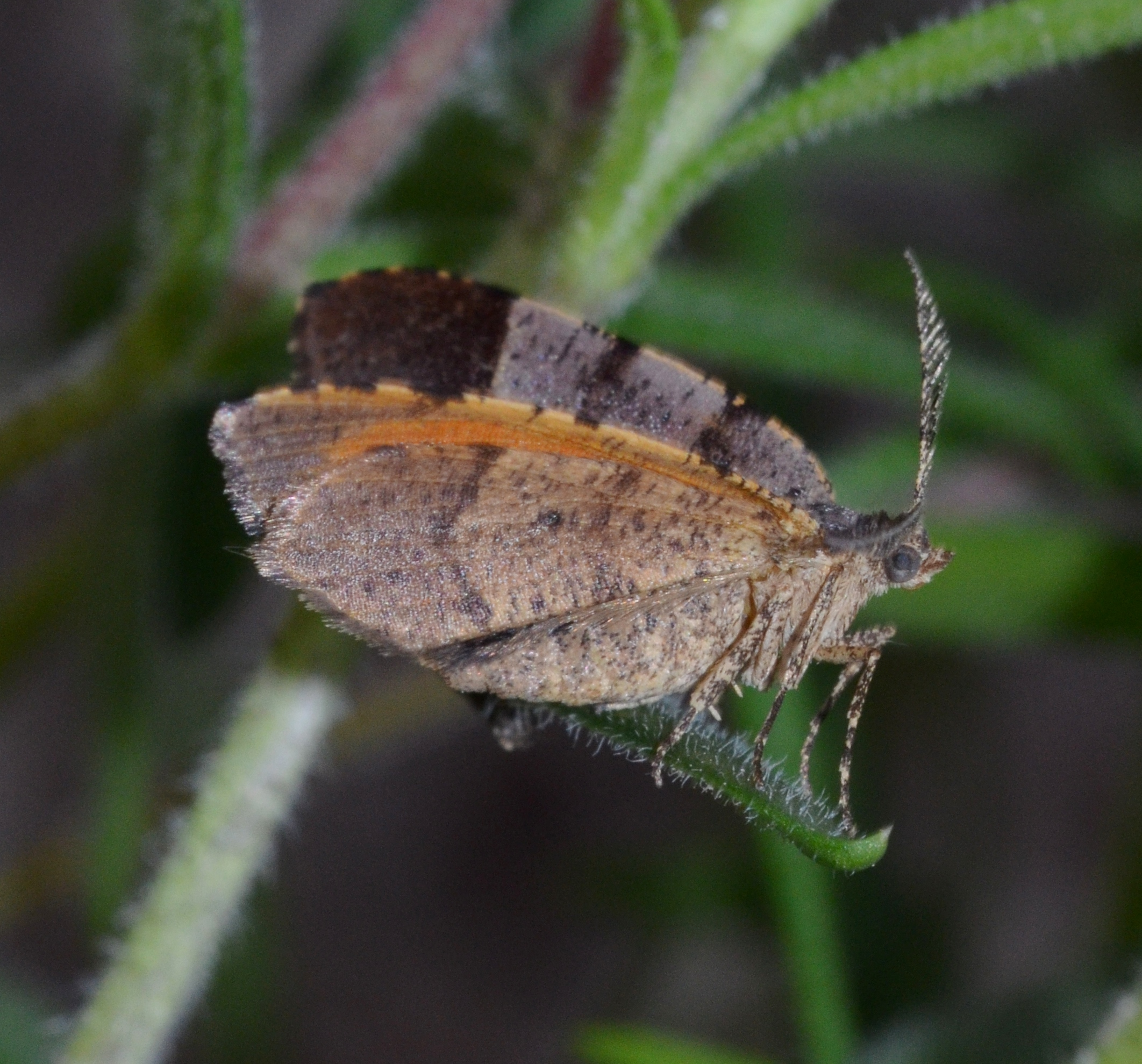

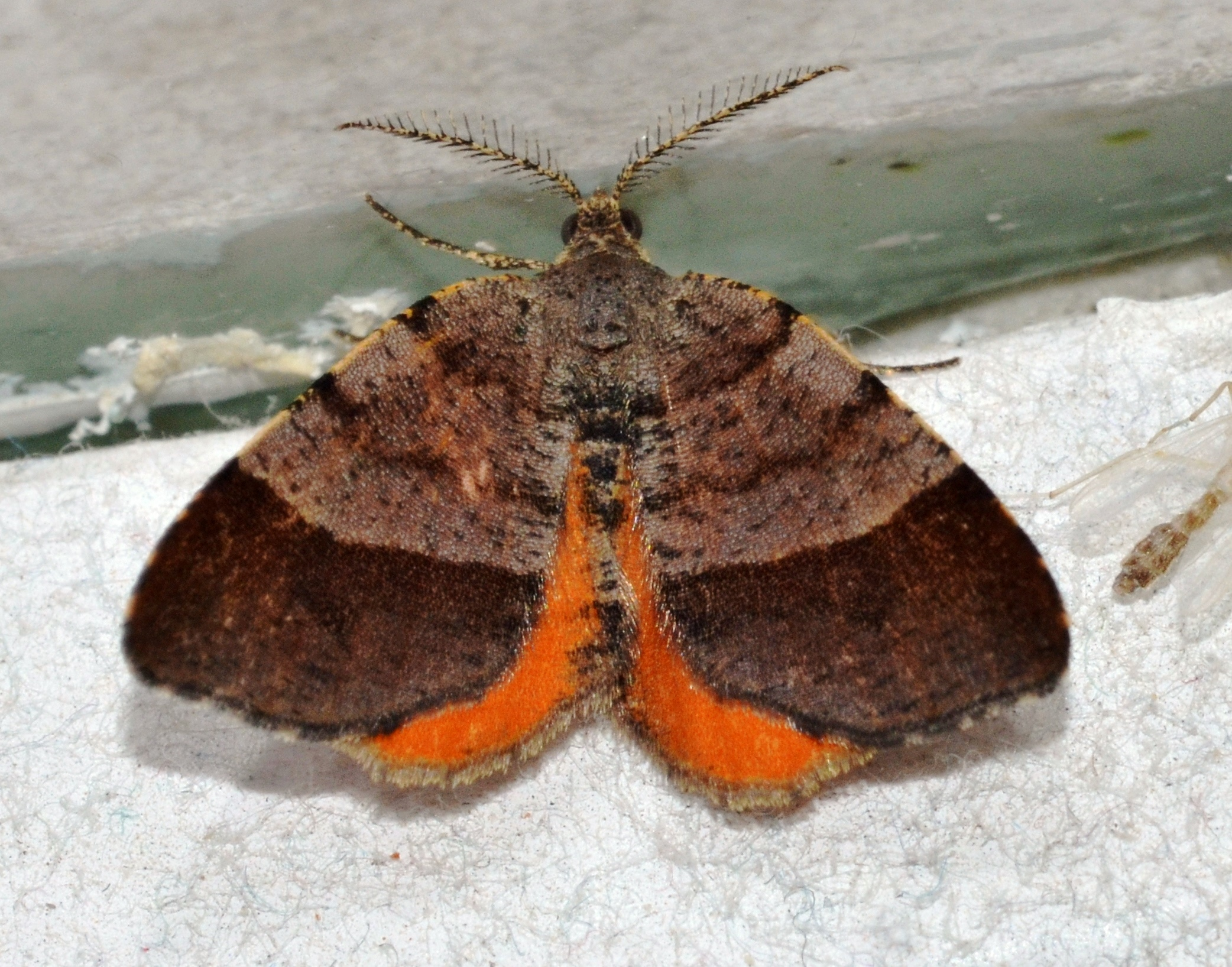

Scientific classification
- Kingdom: Animalia
- Phylum: Arthropoda
- Clade: Pancrustacea
- Class: Insecta
- Order: Lepidoptera
- Family: Geometridae
- Tribe: Macariini
- Genus: Mellilla; Grote, 1873
- Species: M. xanthometata

Binomial name
- Mellilla xanthometata (Walker, 1862)

Synonyms
- Generic: Gonilythria Gumppenberg, 1887; Specific: Fidonia xanthometata Walker, 1862; Mellilla chamaechrysaria Grote, 1873; Lythria rilevaria Packard, 1876; Lythria snoviaria Packard, 1876

= Mellilla =

Genus of insects

Mellilla is a monotypic genus of moths in the family Geometridae erected by Augustus Radcliffe Grote in 1873. Its only species, Mellilla xanthometata, the orangewing moth, was first described by Francis Walker in 1862. It is found in most of eastern North America.

The wingspan is about 16–21 mm. Adults have been recorded on wing in early spring and again in late June in two generations per year. Adults are active during both the day and night.

The larvae feed on Gleditsia triacanthos.
