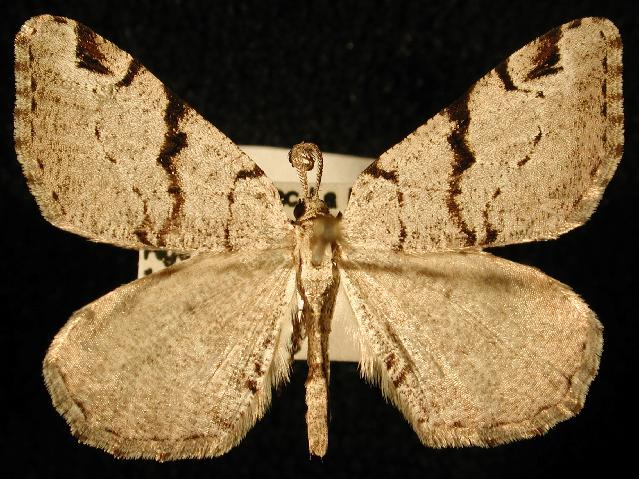

Scientific classification
- Kingdom: Animalia
- Phylum: Arthropoda
- Clade: Pancrustacea
- Class: Insecta
- Order: Lepidoptera
- Family: Geometridae
- Genus: Speranza
- Species: S. bitactata

Binomial name
- Speranza bitactata (Walker, 1862)

Synonyms
- Halia packardaria Möschler, 1883; Heterophleps atrosignata Walker, 1862; Itame epigenata Barnes & McDunnough, 1917; Thera bitactata Walker, 1862

= Speranza bitactata =

Species of moth

Speranza bitactata, the split-lined speranza, is a moth in the family Geometridae. The species was first described by Francis Walker in 1862. It is found in North America.

The MONA or Hodges number for Speranza bitactata is 6304.
