= Frederickia s-signata =

Scientific classification
- Kingdom: Animalia
- Phylum: Arthropoda
- Clade: Pancrustacea
- Class: Insecta
- Order: Lepidoptera
- Family: Geometridae
- Genus: Frederickia
- Species: F. s-signata

Binomial name
- Frederickia s-signata (Packard, 1873)

Synonyms
- Rindgea s-signata (Packard, 1873); Macaria s-signata Packard, 1873

Species of moth

Frederickia s-signata, the signate looper moth, is a species of geometrid moth in the family Geometridae. It is found in Central America and North America.
