= Speranza grossbecki =

Scientific classification
- Kingdom: Animalia
- Phylum: Arthropoda
- Clade: Pancrustacea
- Class: Insecta
- Order: Lepidoptera
- Family: Geometridae
- Genus: Speranza
- Species: S. grossbecki

Binomial name
- Speranza grossbecki (Barnes & McDunnough, 1913)

Synonyms
- Diastictis grossbecki Barnes & McDunnough, 1913

Species of moth

Speranza grossbecki is a species of moth in the family Geometridae first described by William Barnes and James Halliday McDunnough in 1913. It is found in North America.

The MONA or Hodges number for Speranza grossbecki is 6315.
