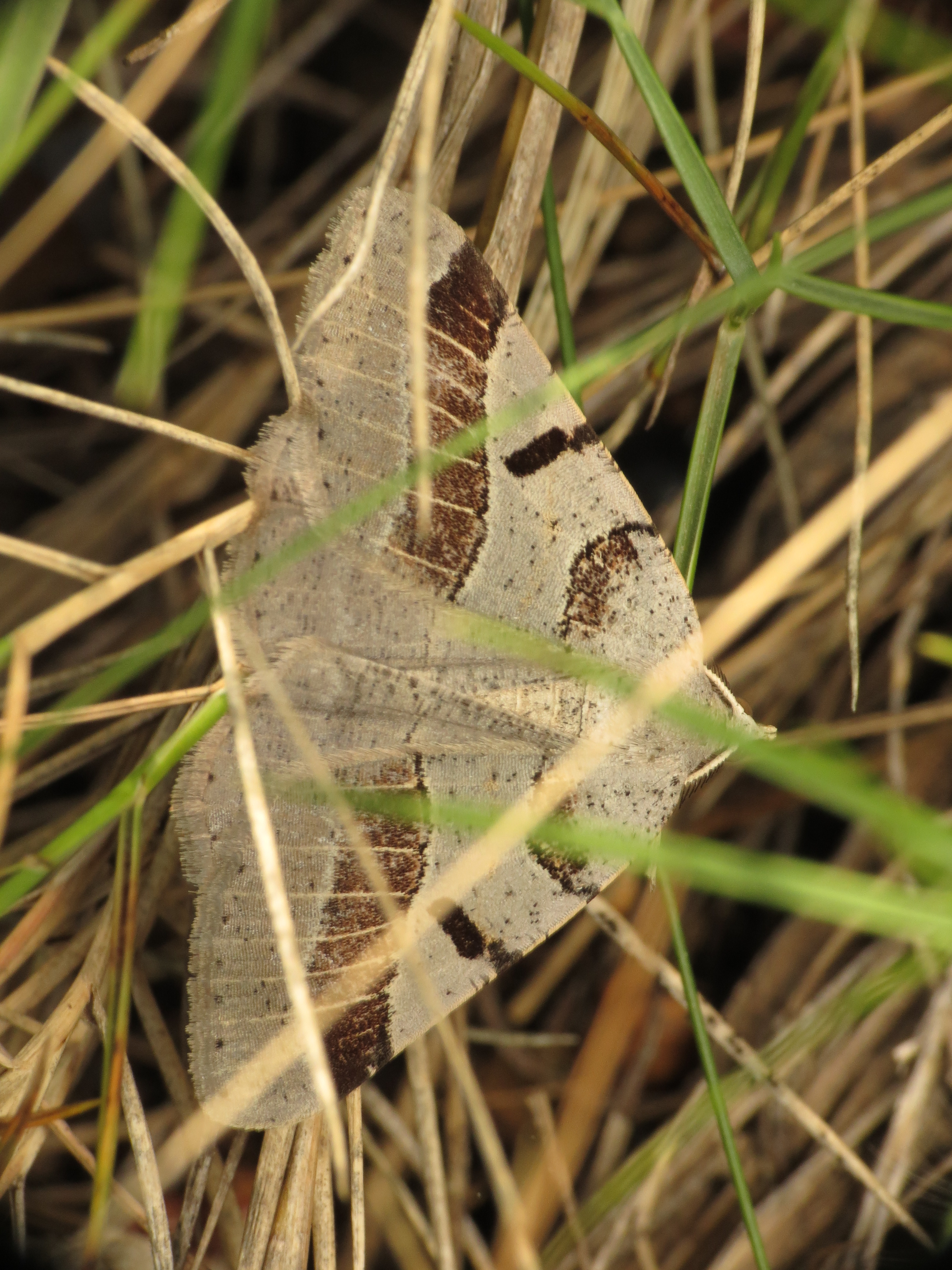

Scientific classification
- Kingdom: Animalia
- Phylum: Arthropoda
- Class: Insecta
- Order: Lepidoptera
- Family: Geometridae
- Genus: Itame
- Species: I. vincularia

Binomial name
- Itame vincularia (Hubner, 1813)

Synonyms
- Geometra vincularia Hubner 1813; Tephrina mrassinaria Oberthur, 1923; Itame atlantis Prout, 1928

= Itame vincularia =

Species of moth

Itame vincularia is a moth in the family Geometridae. It is found in France, Portugal, Spain, North Africa and Turkey.

The wingspan is about 28–32 mm.

The larvae feed on Rhamnus infectoria and Frangula alnus.

== Subspecies ==
- Itame vincularia vincularia
- Itame vincularia latefasciata Rothschild, 1914
- Itame vincularia lycioidaria Herbulot, 1957
- Itame vincularia mrassinaria (Oberthur, 1923)
