= Speranza abruptata =

Scientific classification
- Kingdom: Animalia
- Phylum: Arthropoda
- Clade: Pancrustacea
- Class: Insecta
- Order: Lepidoptera
- Family: Geometridae
- Genus: Speranza
- Species: S. abruptata

Binomial name
- Speranza abruptata (Walker, 1862)

Synonyms
- Camptogramma abruptata Walker, 1862; Diastictus pallidula Hulst, 1896

Species of moth

Speranza abruptata is a species of geometrid moth in the family Geometridae. It is found in North America.
