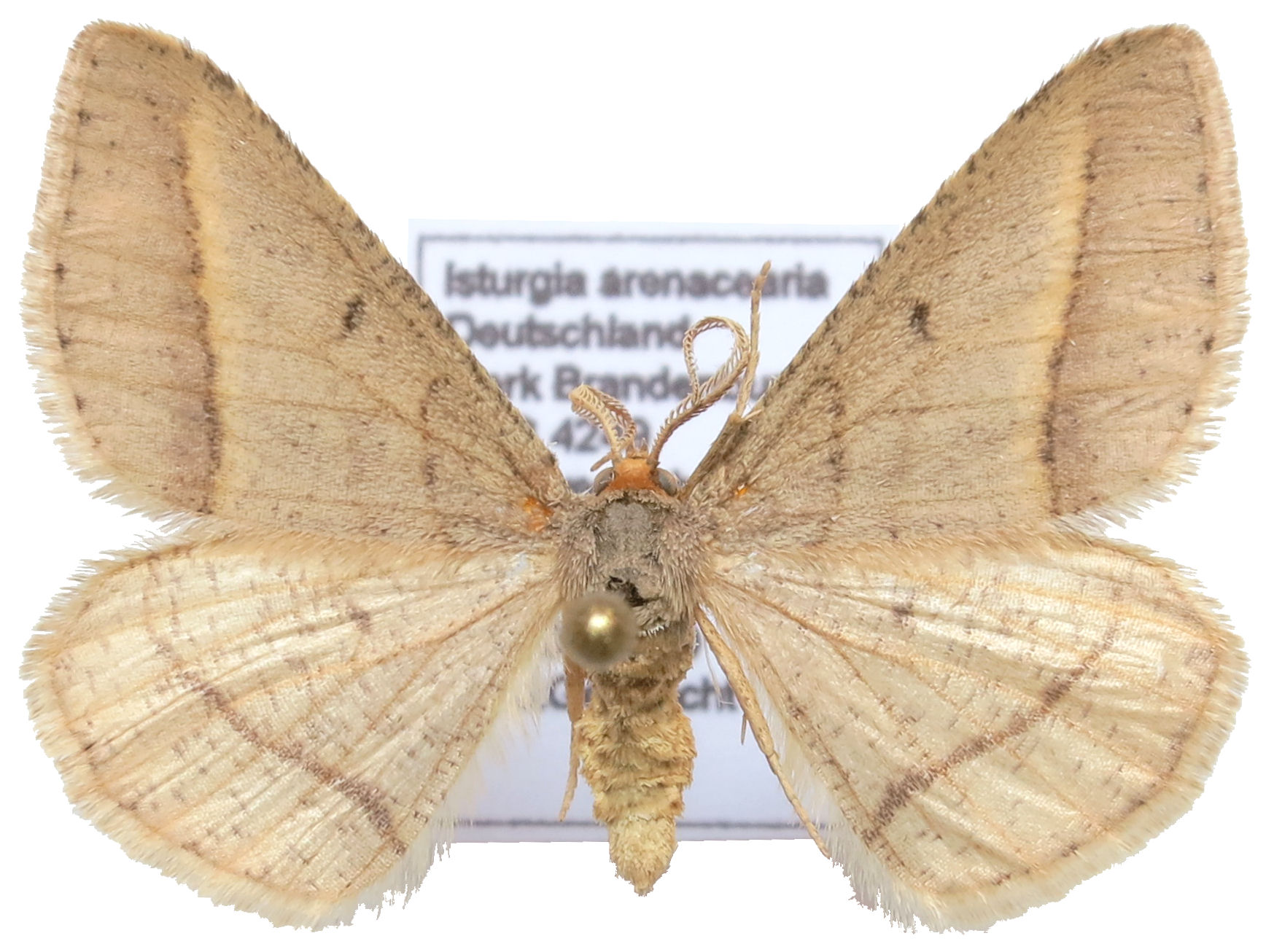
- Itame arenacearia - Brandenburg, Germany

Scientific classification
- Domain: Eukaryota
- Kingdom: Animalia
- Phylum: Arthropoda
- Class: Insecta
- Order: Lepidoptera
- Family: Geometridae
- Tribe: Macariini
- Genus: Itame; Hubner, 1823

= Itame =

Genus of moths

Itame is a genus of moths in the family Geometridae.

== Species ==
- Itame messapiaria Sohn-Rethel, 1929
- Itame sparsaria (Hübner, 1809)
- Itame teknaria Powell & Rungs, 1942
- Itame vincularia (Hübner, 1813)

== Status unknown ==
- Itame wanaria Linnaeus - See Macaria wauaria
