= Speranza graphidaria =

Scientific classification
- Kingdom: Animalia
- Phylum: Arthropoda
- Clade: Pancrustacea
- Class: Insecta
- Order: Lepidoptera
- Family: Geometridae
- Genus: Speranza
- Species: S. graphidaria

Binomial name
- Speranza graphidaria (Hulst, 1887)

Synonyms
- Semiothisa graphidaria Hulst, 1887

Species of moth

Speranza graphidaria is a species of geometrid moth in the family Geometridae. It is found in North America.

The MONA or Hodges number for Speranza graphidaria is 6311.
