= Speranza simplex =

Scientific classification
- Kingdom: Animalia
- Phylum: Arthropoda
- Clade: Pancrustacea
- Class: Insecta
- Order: Lepidoptera
- Family: Geometridae
- Genus: Speranza
- Species: S. simplex

Binomial name
- Speranza simplex (Dyar, 1907)

Synonyms
- Pygmaena simplex Dyar, 1907

Species of moth

Speranza simplex is a species of geometrid moth in the family Geometridae. It is found in North America.

The MONA or Hodges number for Speranza simplex is 6281.
