= Plateoplia =

Scientific classification
- Kingdom: Animalia
- Phylum: Arthropoda
- Class: Insecta
- Order: Lepidoptera
- Family: Geometridae
- Tribe: Macariini
- Genus: Plateoplia; Warren, 1909

Genus of moths

Plateoplia is a genus of moths in the family Geometridae.

== Species ==
- Plateoplia acrobelia (Wallengren, 1875)
