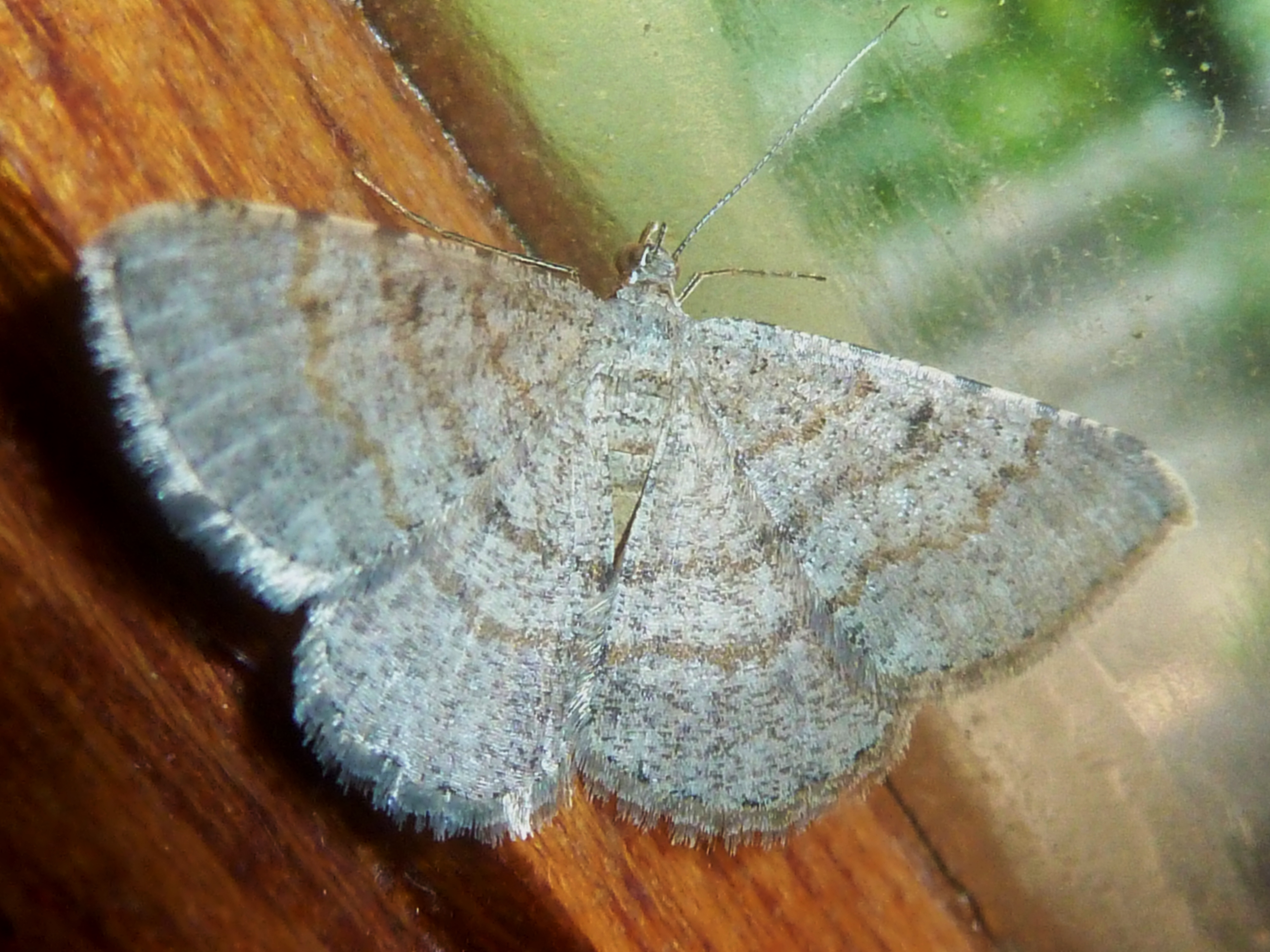
- female

Scientific classification
- Kingdom: Animalia
- Phylum: Arthropoda
- Clade: Pancrustacea
- Class: Insecta
- Order: Lepidoptera
- Family: Geometridae
- Genus: Acanthovalva
- Species: A. inconspicuaria

Binomial name
- Acanthovalva inconspicuaria (Hübner, 1819)

Synonyms
- Geometria inconspicuaria Hübner, 1819; Acidalia cinerascens Butler, 1875; Tephrina cinnamomaria Rothschild, 1914; Selidosema osyraria Guenée, 1858; Tephrina perturbata Bastelberger, 1908; Eubolia pumicaria Lederer, 1855

= Acanthovalva inconspicuaria =

Species of moth

Acanthovalva inconspicuaria is a species of moth in the family Geometridae. It is found in southern Europe, the Near East and throughout of Africa from Morocco to South Africa.

A known hostplant for the larvae of this species is Acacia nilotica.
