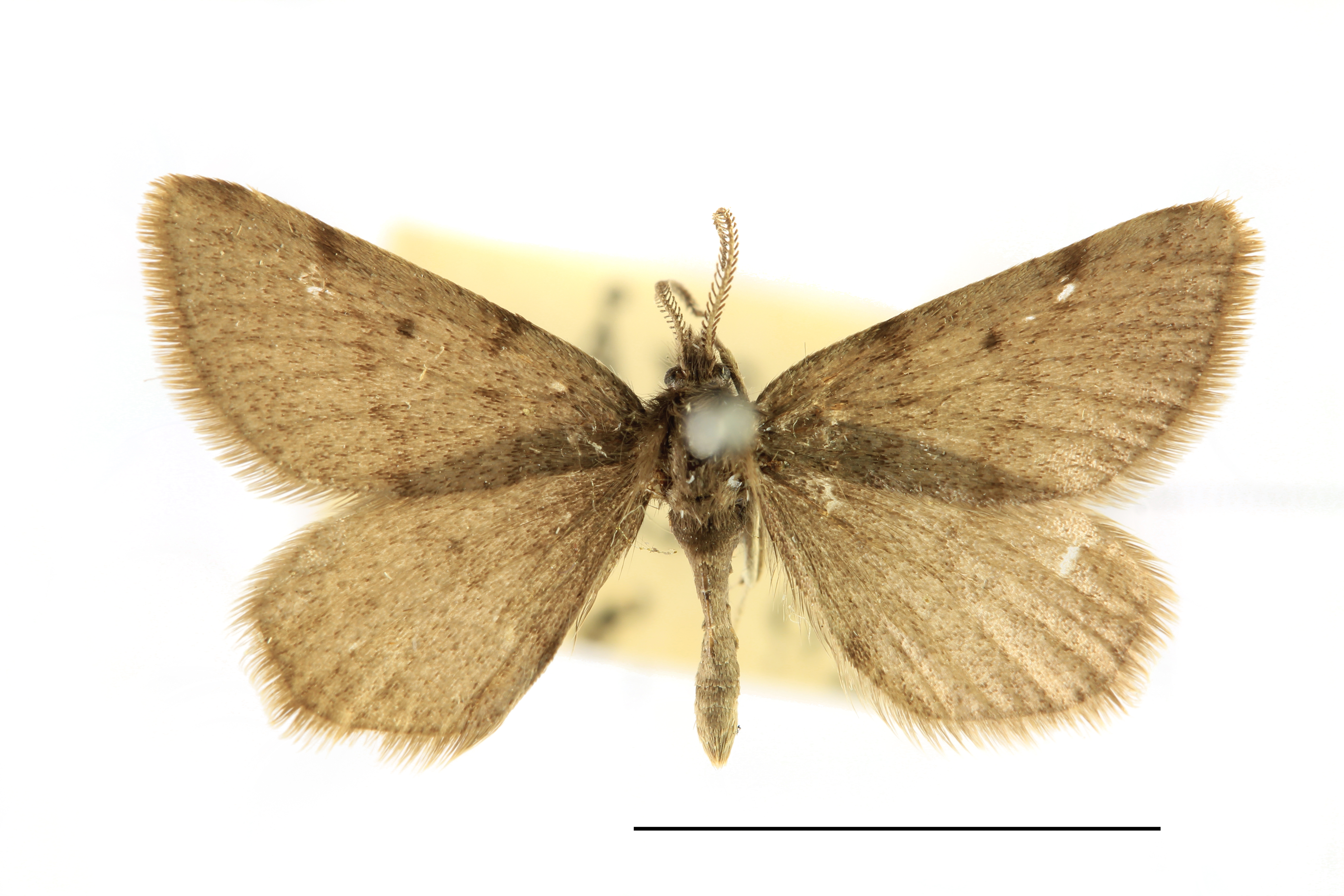

Scientific classification
- Kingdom: Animalia
- Phylum: Arthropoda
- Class: Insecta
- Order: Lepidoptera
- Family: Geometridae
- Tribe: Macariini
- Genus: Pygmaena

= Pygmaena =

Genus of moths

Pygmaena is a genus of moths in the family Geometridae.
