= Aporhoptrina =

Scientific classification
- Kingdom: Animalia
- Phylum: Arthropoda
- Class: Insecta
- Order: Lepidoptera
- Family: Geometridae
- Tribe: Macariini
- Genus: Aporhoptrina; Wehrli, 1953

Genus of geometer moths

Aporhoptrina is a genus of moths in the family Geometridae.

== Species ==
- Aporhoptrina semiorbiculata (Christoph, 1881)
