= Speranza coloradensis =

Scientific classification
- Kingdom: Animalia
- Phylum: Arthropoda
- Clade: Pancrustacea
- Class: Insecta
- Order: Lepidoptera
- Family: Geometridae
- Genus: Speranza
- Species: S. coloradensis

Binomial name
- Speranza coloradensis (Hulst, 1896)

Synonyms
- Sympherta coloradensis Hulst, 1896

Species of moth

Speranza coloradensis is a species of geometrid moth in the family Geometridae. It is found in North America.
