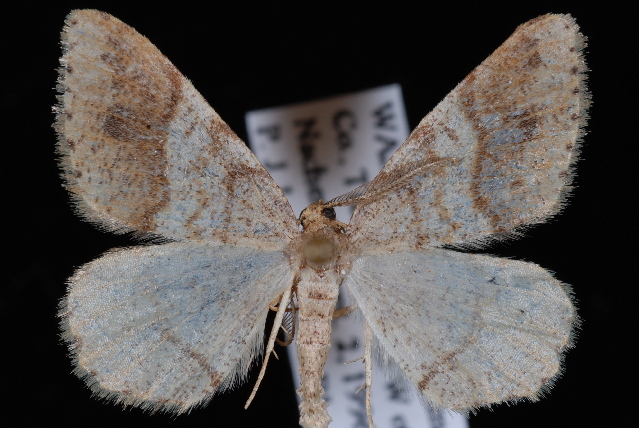

Scientific classification
- Kingdom: Animalia
- Phylum: Arthropoda
- Clade: Pancrustacea
- Class: Insecta
- Order: Lepidoptera
- Family: Geometridae
- Genus: Speranza
- Species: S. plumosata

Binomial name
- Speranza plumosata (Barnes & McDunnough, 1917)

Synonyms
- Itame plumosata Barnes & McDunnough, 1917

= Speranza plumosata =

Species of moth

Speranza plumosata is a species of moth in the family Geometridae first described by William Barnes and James Halliday McDunnough in 1917. It is found in North America.

The MONA or Hodges number for Speranza plumosata is 6296.
