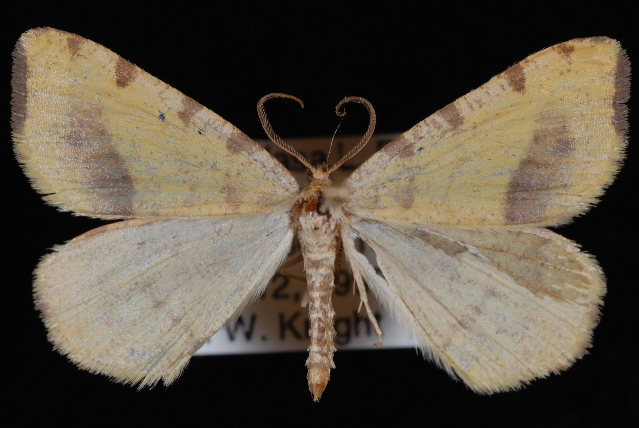

Scientific classification
- Kingdom: Animalia
- Phylum: Arthropoda
- Clade: Pancrustacea
- Class: Insecta
- Order: Lepidoptera
- Family: Geometridae
- Genus: Speranza
- Species: S. occiduaria

Binomial name
- Speranza occiduaria (Packard, 1874)

Synonyms
- Caulostoma occiduaria Packard, 1874; Diastictis andersoni Swett, 1916

= Speranza occiduaria =

Species of moth

Speranza occiduaria is a species of geometrid moth in the family Geometridae. It is found in North America.

The MONA or Hodges number for Speranza occiduaria is 6279.
