= Speranza extemporata =

Scientific classification
- Kingdom: Animalia
- Phylum: Arthropoda
- Clade: Pancrustacea
- Class: Insecta
- Order: Lepidoptera
- Family: Geometridae
- Genus: Speranza
- Species: S. extemporata

Binomial name
- Speranza extemporata (Barnes & McDunnough, 1917)

Synonyms
- Itame extemporata Barnes & McDunnough, 1917

Species of moth

Speranza extemporata is a species of moth in the family Geometridae first described by William Barnes and James Halliday McDunnough in 1917. It is found in North America.

The MONA or Hodges number for Speranza extemporata is 6298.
