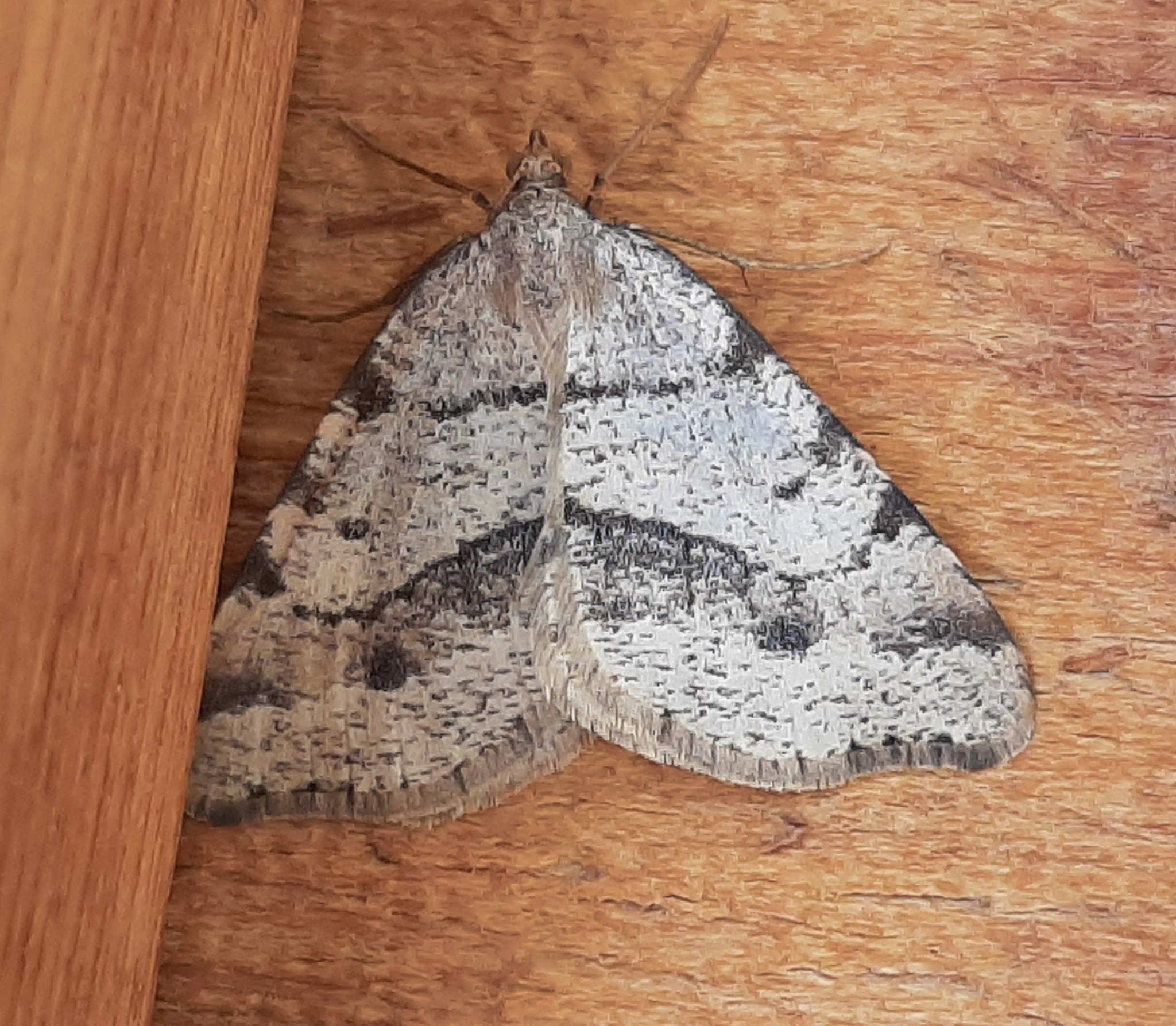

Scientific classification
- Kingdom: Animalia
- Phylum: Arthropoda
- Clade: Pancrustacea
- Class: Insecta
- Order: Lepidoptera
- Family: Geometridae
- Genus: Speranza
- Species: S. flavicaria

Binomial name
- Speranza flavicaria (Packard, 1876)

Synonyms
- Macaria flavicaria (Hulst, 1896); Macaria subfalcata (Hulst, 1896); Thamnonoma flavicaria Packard, 1876

= Speranza flavicaria =

Species of moth

Speranza flavicaria is a species of geometrid moth in the family Geometridae. It is found in North America.
