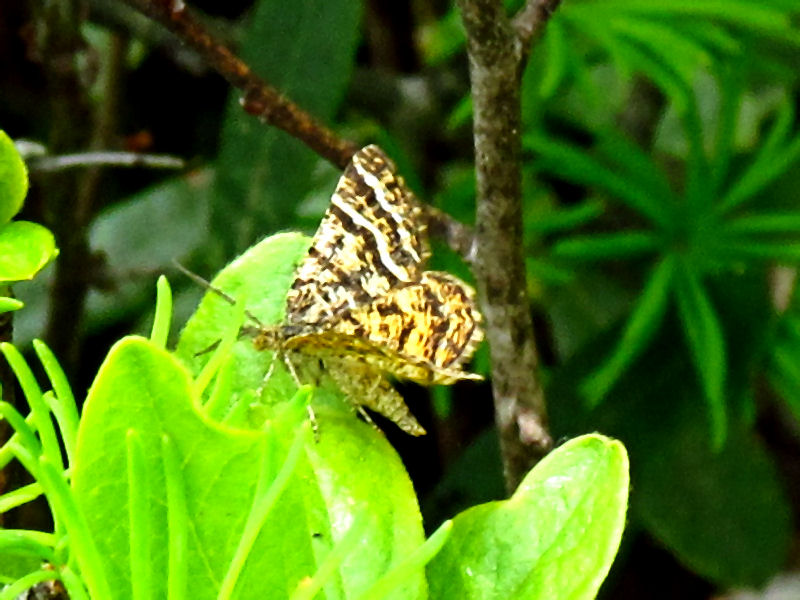

Scientific classification
- Kingdom: Animalia
- Phylum: Arthropoda
- Clade: Pancrustacea
- Class: Insecta
- Order: Lepidoptera
- Family: Geometridae
- Genus: Epelis
- Species: E. truncataria

Binomial name
- Epelis truncataria (Walker, 1862)

Synonyms
- Fidonia truncataria Walker, 1862

= Epelis truncataria =

Species of moth

Epelis truncataria, the black-banded orange, is a species of geometrid moth in the family Geometridae. It is found in North America.

The MONA or Hodges number for Epelis truncataria is 6321.
