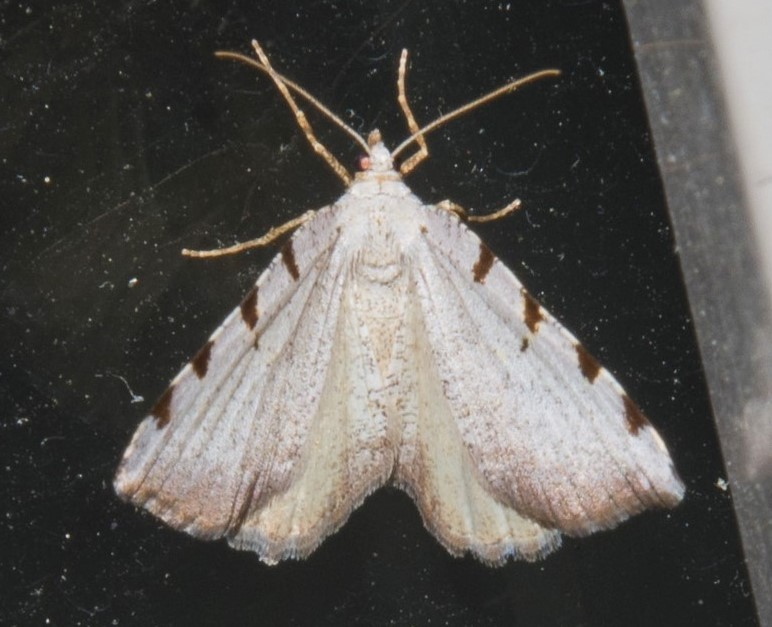

Scientific classification
- Kingdom: Animalia
- Phylum: Arthropoda
- Clade: Pancrustacea
- Class: Insecta
- Order: Lepidoptera
- Family: Geometridae
- Genus: Speranza
- Species: S. coortaria

Binomial name
- Speranza coortaria (Hulst, 1887)

Synonyms
- Itame coortaria enigmata Barnes & McDunnough, 1917; Thammnonoma coortaria Hulst, 1887

= Speranza coortaria =

Species of moth

Speranza coortaria, the four-spotted speranza, is a species of moth in the family Geometridae. The species was first described by George Duryea Hulst in 1887. It is found in North America.
