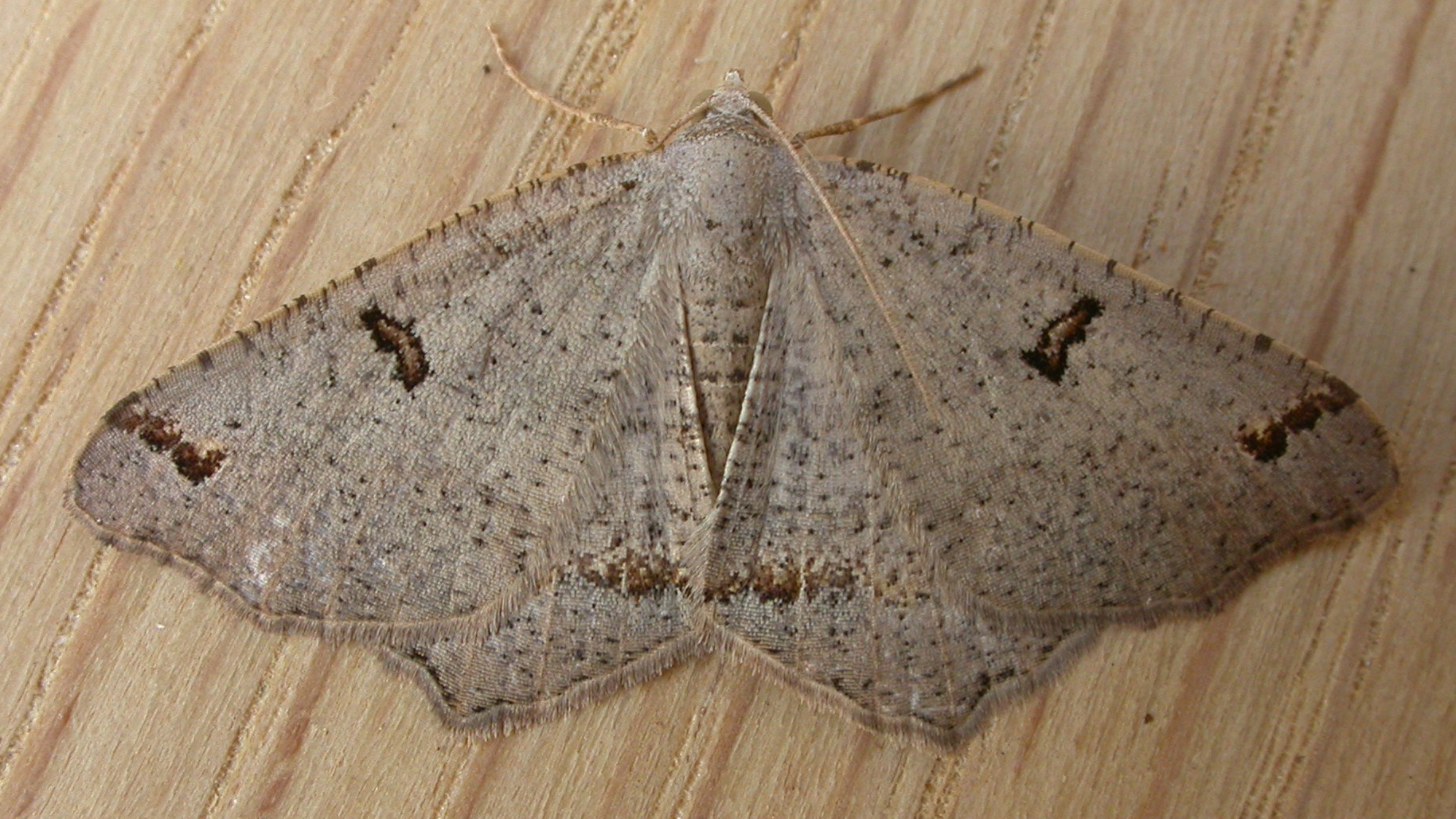

Scientific classification
- Kingdom: Animalia
- Phylum: Arthropoda
- Class: Insecta
- Order: Lepidoptera
- Family: Geometridae
- Genus: Dissomorphia
- Species: D. australiaria

Binomial name
- Dissomorphia australiaria Guenée, 1857

Synonyms
- Macaria apamaria

= Dissomorphia australiaria =

Species of moth

Dissomorphia australiaria is a moth of the family Geometridae first described by Achille Guenée in 1857. It is found in Australia.

The larvae feed on Acacia dealbata and Acacia mearnsii.
