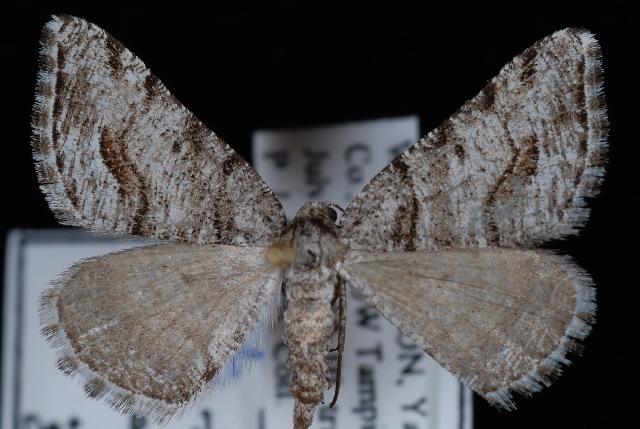

Scientific classification
- Kingdom: Animalia
- Phylum: Arthropoda
- Clade: Pancrustacea
- Class: Insecta
- Order: Lepidoptera
- Family: Geometridae
- Genus: Speranza
- Species: S. colata

Binomial name
- Speranza colata (Grote, 1881)

= Speranza colata =

Species of moth

Speranza colata is a species of geometrid moth in the family Geometridae. It is found in North America.

The MONA or Hodges number for Speranza colata is 6308.

== Subspecies ==
These two subspecies belong to the species Speranza colata:

- Speranza colata colata (Grote, 1881)
- Speranza colata correllata (Hulst, 1896)
