= Speranza argillacearia =

Scientific classification
- Kingdom: Animalia
- Phylum: Arthropoda
- Clade: Pancrustacea
- Class: Insecta
- Order: Lepidoptera
- Family: Geometridae
- Genus: Speranza
- Species: S. argillacearia

Binomial name
- Speranza argillacearia (Packard, 1874)

Synonyms
- Tephrina argillacearia Packard, 1874

Species of moth

Speranza argillacearia, the mousy angle moth, is a species of geometrid moth in the family Geometridae. It is found in North America. Its larval host is blueberry (Vaccinium) and another common name for it is the blueberry spanworm.

The MONA or Hodges number for Speranza argillacearia is 6282.
