= Speranza denticulodes =

Scientific classification
- Kingdom: Animalia
- Phylum: Arthropoda
- Clade: Pancrustacea
- Class: Insecta
- Order: Lepidoptera
- Family: Geometridae
- Genus: Speranza
- Species: S. denticulodes

Binomial name
- Speranza denticulodes (Hulst, 1896)

Synonyms
- Diastictis denticulodes Hulst, 1896

Species of moth

Speranza denticulodes is a species of geometrid moth in the family Geometridae. It is found in North America.

The MONA or Hodges number for Speranza denticulodes is 6305.
