= Frederickia stipularia =

Scientific classification
- Kingdom: Animalia
- Phylum: Arthropoda
- Class: Insecta
- Order: Lepidoptera
- Family: Geometridae
- Genus: Frederickia
- Species: F. stipularia

Binomial name
- Frederickia stipularia (Barnes & McDunnough, 1913)

Synonyms
- Rindgea stipularia (Barnes & McDunnough, 1913); Macaria stipularia Barnes & McDunnough, 1913

Species of moth

Frederickia stipularia is a species of moth in the family Geometridae first described by William Barnes and James Halliday McDunnough in 1913.
