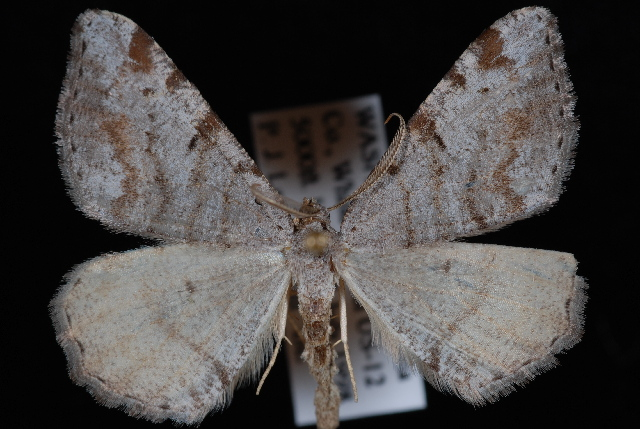

Scientific classification
- Kingdom: Animalia
- Phylum: Arthropoda
- Clade: Pancrustacea
- Class: Insecta
- Order: Lepidoptera
- Family: Geometridae
- Genus: Speranza
- Species: S. quadrilinearia

Binomial name
- Speranza quadrilinearia (Packard, 1873)

Synonyms
- Halia quadrilinearia Packard, 1873; Macaria quadrilinearia (Packard, 1873); Selidosema pallescens Grossbeck, 1907; Semiothisa inquinaria Hulst, 1887; Tephrina disparata Warren, 1904

= Speranza quadrilinearia =

Species of moth

Speranza quadrilinearia is a species of geometrid moth in the family Geometridae. It is found in Central America and North America.

The MONA or Hodges number for Speranza quadrilinearia is 6288.
