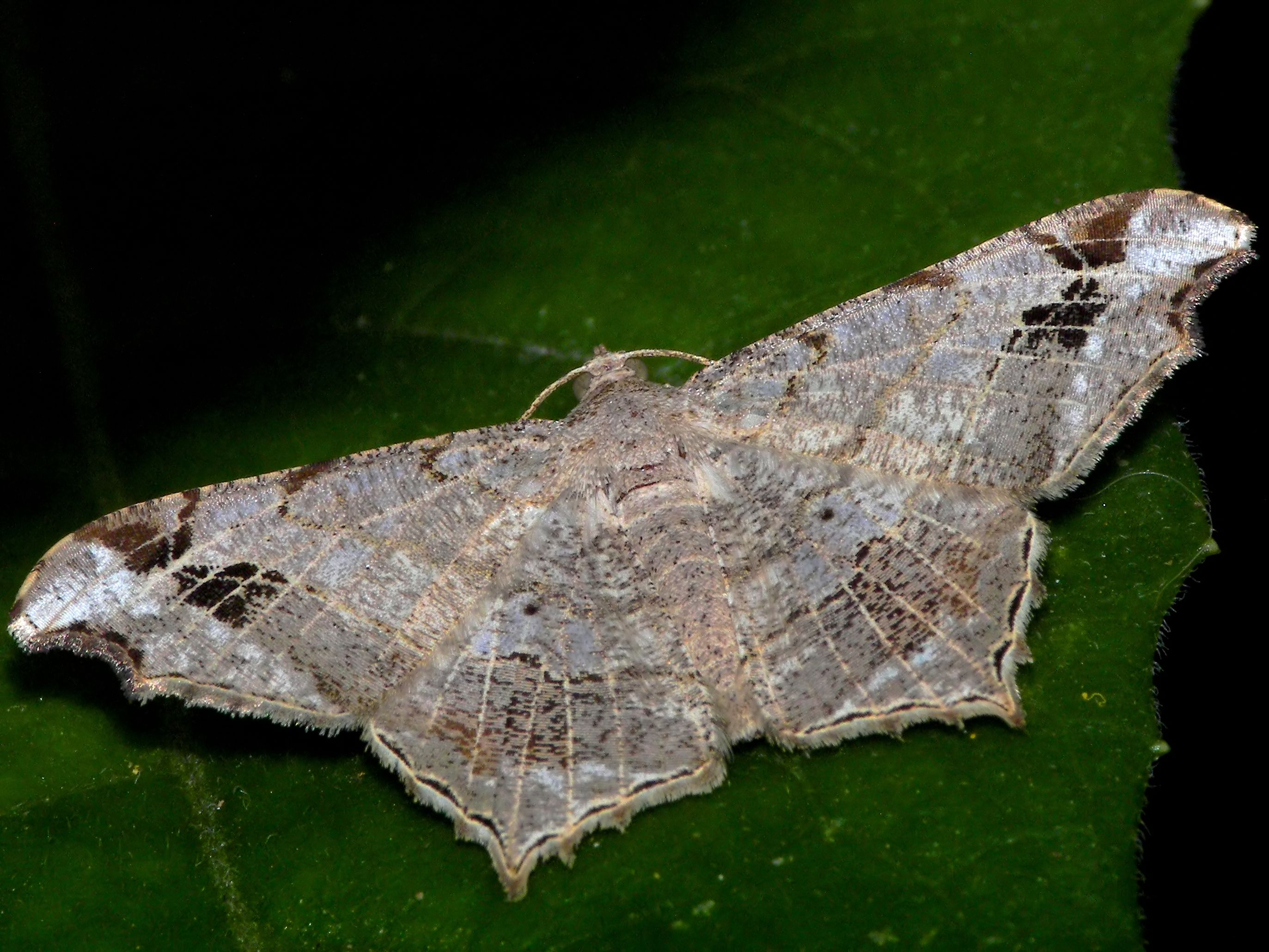
- Semiothisa emersaria is sometimes placed in Chiasmia

Scientific classification
- Kingdom: Animalia
- Phylum: Arthropoda
- Class: Insecta
- Order: Lepidoptera
- Family: Geometridae
- Subfamily: Ennominae
- Tribe: Macariini; Guenée, 1858

Genera
- See text

Synonyms
- Fernaldellini Hulst, 1896; Semiothisini Warren, 1894

= Macariini =

Tribe of moths

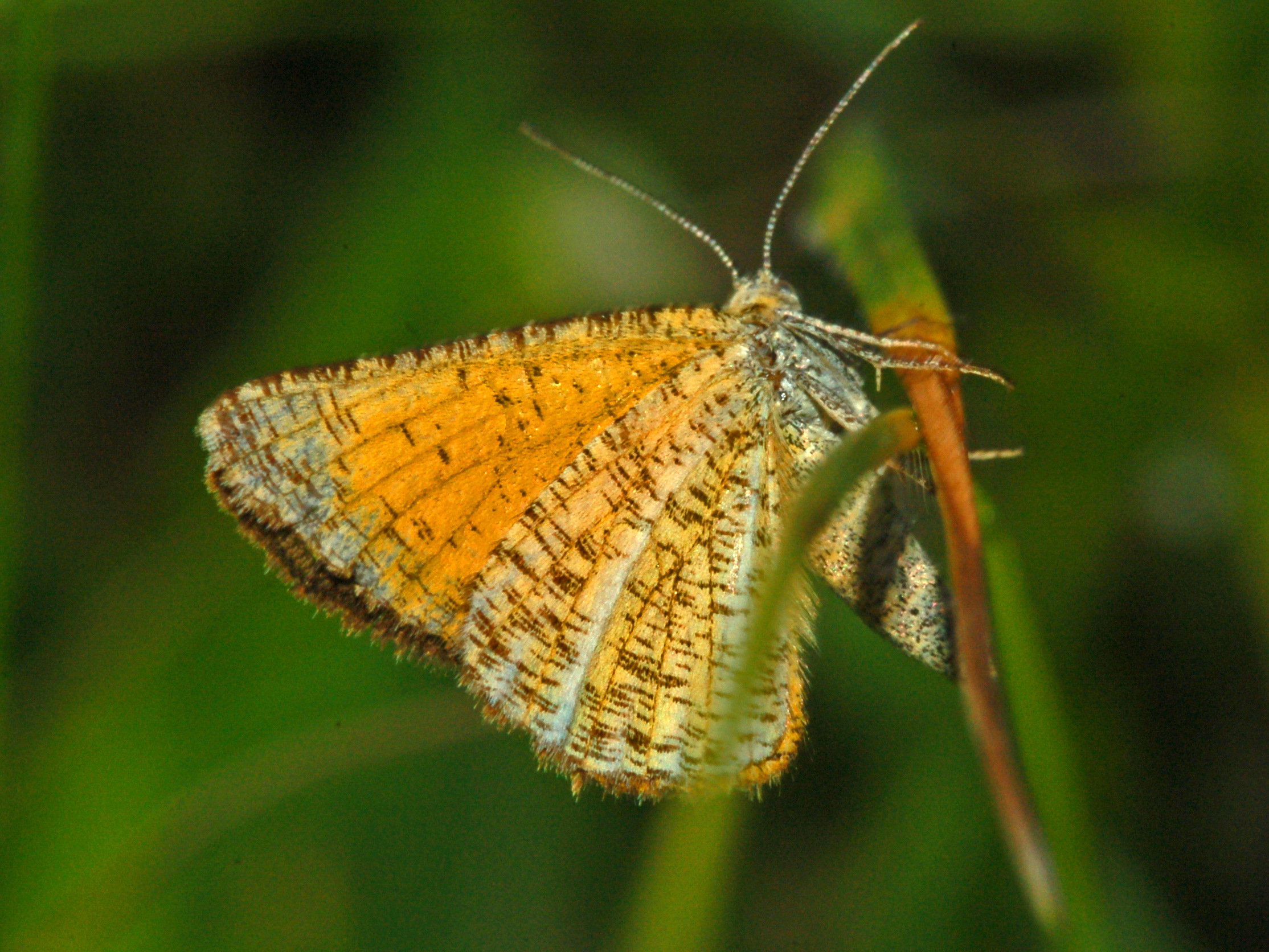
Isturgia limbaria

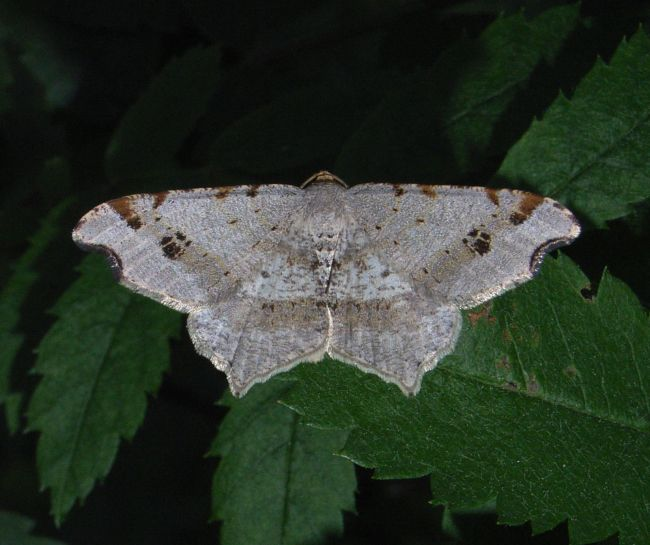
Macaria alternata

The Macariini are a tribe of geometer moths in the subfamily Ennominae. Though they share many traits with the Sterrhinae, this is probably plesiomorphic rather than indicative of a close relationship, and DNA sequence data points to the Boarmiini as particularly close relatives of the Macariini. All things considered, this tribe might still resemble the first Ennominae more than any other living lineage in the subfamily.

== Selected genera and species ==
As numerous ennominae genera have not yet been assigned to a tribe, the genus list should be considered preliminary.

- Acanthovalva
- Aporhoptrina
- Chiasmia
- Digrammia
- Dissomorphia
- Elpiste
- Epelis
- Eumacaria
- Fernaldella
- Gnopharmia
- Godonela
- Heliomata - might belong in Abraxini (Cassymini if distinct)
- Heterocallia
- Hypephyra
- Isturgia
  - Frosted yellow, Isturgia limbaria
- Itame
- Letispe
- Luxiaria
- Macaria
- Mellilla
- Milocera
- Monocerotesa - might belong in Boarmiini
- Narraga
- Neritodes (tentatively placed here)
- Oxymacaria
- Parosteodes
- Phyle
- Plateoplia
- Platypepla
- Psamatodes
- Pygmaena
- Rectopis
- Rindgea
- Rhoptria
- Semiothisa – includes Chiasmia and Macaria
  - Latticed heath, Semiothisa clathrata
- Speranza
- Tephrina
- Trigrammia

In addition, "Boarmia" penthearia appears to belong to the Macariini too.
