= T. formosa =

T. formosa may refer to:

- Tatargina formosa, an Asian moth
- Tephritis formosa, a fruit fly
- Terebra formosa, an auger snail
- Tetracis formosa, a geometer moth
- Tima formosa, a marine hydrozoan
- Tirumala formosa, an African butterfly
- Trypeta formosa, a fruit fly
- Turbonilla formosa, a sea snail
