= Tetracis montanaria =

Scientific classification
- Kingdom: Animalia
- Phylum: Arthropoda
- Clade: Pancrustacea
- Class: Insecta
- Order: Lepidoptera
- Family: Geometridae
- Genus: Tetracis
- Species: T. montanaria

Binomial name
- Tetracis montanaria Ferris, 2009

Species of moth

Tetracis montanaria is a North American moth in the family Geometridae. This moth is distinguished by the shape of its postmedian line and it's geographic range. Adults have been sighted in southeast Arizona in October. The species' name means "of the mountains".

== Range and Habitat ==
This moth is found in aspen-coniferous forests in montane ecoregions. Its range is believe to be limited to the higher elevation mountains in southeastern Arizona at elevations from 8,000 - 8,900 ft., including Graham, Pima and possibly Apache Counties.

== Description ==
Ferris and Schmidt give a anatomical description in "Revision of the North American Genera Tetracis...".

"Adults (Figs. 10, 54–58): FWL: 22–25 mm. Antenna pale ochreous to whitish dorsally, nearly filiform, ventrally densely setose with gaps between segments (laminate), narrower in female. Palpi moderately broad, porrect or slightly upcurved, about 1.8x eye width, dark ochreous with dark brown tips. Head, thorax, abdomen, legs ochreous, varying in hue across individuals. Legs and ventral abdomen flecked with scattered brown scales. Wings: Base color generally ochreous orange-brown. FW apex weakly falcate. AM and PM lines brown; PM line narrow, flattened “S-shape”, with very narrow pale outer edge, bending sharply basad at vein M3; MB slightly darker then rest of wing. DHW with poorly-developed median line that fades out toward upper margin. Dark discal spots on FW and HW. Ventrally paler with dorsal markings repeated lightly." The publication also describes characteristics of the species' reproductive organs.

The species holotype was collected in Graham Co. Arizona in 2006, and first described by C. D. Ferris in 2009.

== Biology ==
The life cycle of this moth is not known but is likely similar to other Geometer moths. Adults are nocturnal and on wing in early October, perhaps into September.

== Similar species ==
- Tetracis jubararia and other Tetracis moths.
- Pero radiosaria
- Moths in the Genus Eusarca
- Pherne parallelia (Found in coastal California)
- Destutia oblentaria and Destutia excelsa.
- Besma sesquilinearia
- Moths of the genus Lambdina

== Additional Reading ==
- Revision of the North American genera Tetracis Guenée and synonymization of Synaxis Hulst with descriptions of three new species By Clifford D. Ferris & B. Christian Schmidt (2010). (Includes Identification key, descriptions, illustrations of genitalia and distribution maps.)(Read online)

== External links with Photos ==
- Bug Guide
- iNaturalist
- Moth Photography Group
