= Tetracis barnesii =

Scientific classification
- Kingdom: Animalia
- Phylum: Arthropoda
- Clade: Pancrustacea
- Class: Insecta
- Order: Lepidoptera
- Family: Geometridae
- Genus: Tetracis
- Species: T. barnesii

Binomial name
- Tetracis barnesii (Hulst, 1896)

Synonyms
- Gonodontis barnesii Hulst, 1896; Synaxis barnesi McDunnough, 1938

Species of moth

Tetracis barnesii is a moth in the family Geometridae. This sandy-brown moth is found in western North America. Adults are seen in the autumn, flying from early September to late October.

This moth was first describes by George Hulst in 1896. It was previously named Gonodontis barnesii (Hulst, 1896) and Synaxis barnesii (McDunnough, 1938).

== Range and Habitat ==
It ranges from the high-desert riparian canyons of Colorado and Utah, the sierras of California, to the dry coniferous forest in Oregon. It is found at altitudes around 5,100-6,250 ft. (1,555 and 1,905 meters).

This moth has been reported in Arizona, California, Utah, New Mexico, Nevada, Colorado, Montana and Oregon.

== Description ==
The length of the forewings 19–23 mm.

Tetracis moths come in varying shades of warm earth tones. The outer edges of the wing are angular. The forewing wingtips are usually falcate and hingwings come to a single point midwing.

T. barnesii can be distinguished by its dark ochreous (orangish-tan to yellowish-brown) wings and body; Two thin, brown crosslines with 'smeared' inward shading at the ends where the lines meets the outer edge of the wing (costal margin); And a sinuous postmedial line with narrow, pale yellow-ochre shading below. The hindwings may have a faint brown median line with pale shading distally. Males have feathery bipectinate antenna, while females have narrow, hair-like (filiform) antennae.

Ferris and Schmidt give a anatomical description in "Revision of the North American Genera Tetracis...".

"Antenna nearly white dorsally, bipectinate in male, nearly filiform in female and densely setose ventrally. Palpi narrow, porrect but terminal segments decurved, slightly longer than eye width, mixed dark ochreous and brown scales, tips darker. Head, abdomen, legs ochreous, varying in hue across individuals. Ventral abdomen and legs paler; legs with scattered dark brown scales. Thorax dorsally and ventrally orange-ochreous and very setose. Wings: Base color ochreous orange-brown.

FW apex weakly falcate. AM and PM lines brown; both slightly convex outwardly; sinuous PM line with only a moderate change in curvature at M3, pale yellow-ochre its entire length (occasionally with some narrow brown shading inwardly), with brown shading inwardly at costal margin. MB only slightly darker than remainder of wing; small dark brown discal spot. DHW paler centrally with darker shading along outer margin; median line poorly developed; discal spot small and faint. Ventrally paler with dorsal markings repeated lightly."

== Biology ==
The full life cycle of this moth is unknown. Adults are nocturnal and on wing from early September to late October.

== Host Plants ==
Larva feed on fruit trees in the rose family (Rosaceae) of the genus Prunus. but may other host plants.

== Similar species ==
- Tetracis jubararia
- Tetracis hirsutaria - Hirsutaria has dark dots (magnification may be necessary) on the lines where they cross the veins.
- Tetracis pallidata - Pallidata is paler and dose not have the pale yellow shading along the postmedial line.
- Destutia excelsa

== Additional Reading ==
- Revision of the North American genera Tetracis Guenée and synonymization of Synaxis Hulst with descriptions of three new species (Lepidoptera: Geometridae: Ennominae) By Clifford D. Ferris & B. Christian Schmidt (2010). (Includes Identification key, descriptions, illustrations of adults and genitalia, and distribution maps.)
- Classification of the Geometrina of North America, with descriptions of new genera and species, by George D. Hulst. Transactions of the American Entomological Society (1896). (Description of species Holotype.)

== External links with Photos ==
- Bug Guide
- iNaturalist
- Moth Photographers Group
