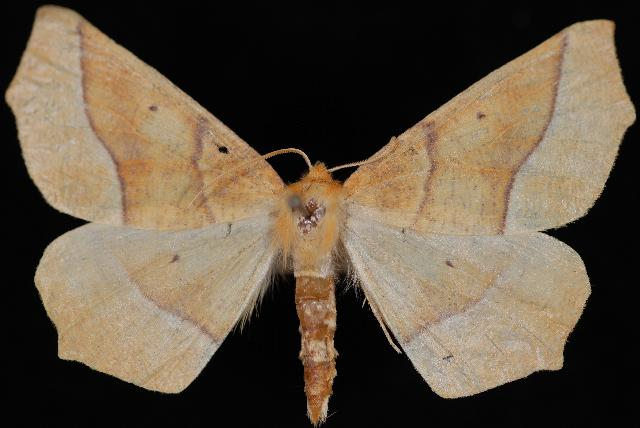

Scientific classification
- Kingdom: Animalia
- Phylum: Arthropoda
- Clade: Pancrustacea
- Class: Insecta
- Order: Lepidoptera
- Family: Geometridae
- Genus: Tetracis
- Species: T. jubararia

Binomial name
- Tetracis jubararia Hulst, 1886

Synonyms
- Synaxis jubararia McDunnough, 1938; Synaxis jubararia sericeata Barnes & McDunnough, 1917

= Tetracis jubararia =

Species of moth

Tetracis jubararia, commonly known as the October Thorn, is a moth of the family Geometridae. This species is known for flying in the fall and having an angular wing shape and colors of ochres and browns that resemble autumn leaves. It is found in western North America.

== Name and Taxonomy ==
It was first described by Hulst in 1886, then by McDunnough in 1938 as Synaxis jubararia. The genus Synaxis was synonymized with Tetracis by Ferris & Schmidt in 2010. The Holotype was collected in Seattle, Washington.

== Subspecies ==
- Tetracis jubararia jubararia (southern California northward to British Columbia and eastward to central Saskatchewan, southwestern Idaho, and White Pine County, Nevada at elevations from 150 to 2255 meters)
- Tetracis jubararia sericeata (Rocky Mountain and Intermountain Regions from 1,830 to 2,590 meters) is a buff (pale yellow-ochre) variation.

== Range and Habitat ==
It widely distributed in Western coniferous, mixed, and deciduous forests.

Moth of ssp. jubararia range across the northwestern North America at elevation of 500-7,400 ft., including British Columbia, California, Idaho, Nevada, Saskatchewan, Oregon, and Washington. The subspecies ssp. sericeata is found in Rocky Mountain and Intermountain regions including Alberta, Colorado, Idaho, Nevada, Utah and Wyoming.

== Life Cycle ==
=== Adult ===
The length of the forewings is 17–26 mm or wingspam of 44mm. Adults of ssp. jubararia are on wing from mid August to late November depending upon locality and elevation. While subspecies ssp. sericeata are on wing from September to mid November. Adults are nocturnal and attracted to light.

This moth typically pale yellowish-brown or ochreous (reddish-brown) with brown speckling, mimicking autumn leaves. The median area between the crosslines may be similarly colored or slightly darker. Additional dark patches and mottling in some individual give the appearance of a 'dead leaf'. Almost white and almost black color variation have been observed. The forewing tips are falcate and each wing has "a pointed protrusion at mid-margin". There are two narrow, brown crosslines. The postmedial line has a gently wave, bending at vein M3. Each wing has a small, black discal spot." Both male and female antenna are filiform (thread-like). (Note: The two crosslines may be referred to as the Basal and Medial or the Antimedial (AM) and Postmedial (PM) lines, with the first line being closest to the body and the second near the middle of the wing.)

Ferris and Schmidt give an anatomical description in "Revision of the North American Genera Tetracis...".

"Antenna pale ochreous to whitish dorsally, nearly filiform, ventrally densely setose with gaps between segments (laminate), narrower in females. Palpi moderately broad, porrect or slightly upcurved, about 2x eye width, dark ochreous with dark brown tips. Head, thorax, abdomen, legs ochreous, varying in hue across individuals. Legs and ventral abdomen flecked with scattered brown scales. Wings: Base color generally tan and dark brown-tan (males) and orange-tan (females). FW apex falcate. AM and PM lines brown; PM line narrow, sinuate, sometimes with very narrow pale outer edge, bending basad at vein M3; MB colored as rest of wing, often with a diffuse darker central patch; submarginal area dark diffuse banding frequently present. Additional patchy markings may be present producing a “dead-leaf” aspect. DHW with poorly-developed median line that fades out toward upper margin. Dark discal spots on FW and HW. Ventrally paler with dorsal markings repeated; wing surfaces with widely-scattered dark scales suggesting a “dead-leaf” pattern."

T. jubararia and T. pallulata, are nearly indistinguishable, although pallulata tends to have darker crosslines and mottling; with pale shading distad (below) and dark shading basad (above) the postmedial line.

DNA sampling and characteristics of the genitalia are sometimes needed to distinguish this species from similar Tetracis moths. For descriptions of genitalia see "Revision of the North American Genera Tetracis" (Ferris and Schmidt 2010).

=== Larva ===
The larva are twig-like inchworms, with a mottled gray to light brown-red body and a dorsal wart on the first thoracic segment. There is one generation per year and it overwinters as an egg.

Adult T. jubararia

T. jubararia caterpillar

British Columbia, Ca

British Columbia, Ca

T. jubararia range

T. j. sericeata range

== Host Plants ==
Larvae of subsp. jubararia have been recorded on:

- Alnus (Alders)
- Betula (Birches)
- Cornus (Dogwoods)
- Populus (poplar, aspen, and cottonwood)
- Ribes (Currents)
- Prunus subcordata (Pacific plum)
- Salix (Willows)
- Picea glauca (white spruce)
- Picea engelmanni (silver spruce)
- Pseudotsuga menziesii (Douglas fir)
- Thuja (Thuja trees)

Miller lists host plants as "alder, chinquapin, snowberry, salal, ocean spray, azalea, elderberry.

== Similar species ==
- Tetracis pallulata is similar in appearance, range and seasonality. T. pallulata tends to have darker crosslines and mottling; with pale shading distad (below) and dark shading basad (above) the postmedial line.
- T. mosesiani overlaps in range in coastal California. Positive identification is made by genitalia.
- T. fuscata is smaller and paler, preferring pine and juniper forests east of the Cascades.
- Tetracis cervinaria, has an earlier season of April to July and a straighter PM line.
- Prochoerodes lineola has a postmedial line that is hooked, curving outward near the costa (outer edge)..
- Pherne placeraria has a straight antimedia line that curves up near the costa (outer edge).

== Additional Reading ==
- Revision of the North American genera Tetracis Guenée and synonymization of Synaxis Hulst with descriptions of three new species (Lepidoptera: Geometridae: Ennominae)
- McGuffin, W.C. (1987) Guide to the Geometridae of Canada (Lepidoptera) II. Subfamily Ennominae 4. Memoirs of the Entomological Society of Canada, No. 138, 1–182.

== External links with photos ==
- Moth Photographers Group
- Bug Guide
- iNaturalist
- Ecdysis arthropod collections
