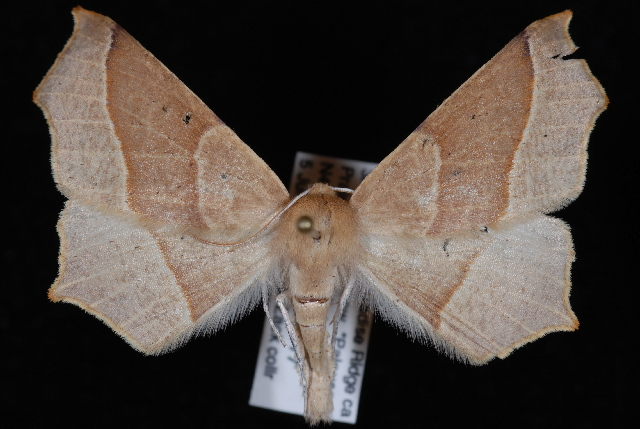

Scientific classification
- Kingdom: Animalia
- Phylum: Arthropoda
- Clade: Pancrustacea
- Class: Insecta
- Order: Lepidoptera
- Family: Geometridae
- Genus: Tetracis
- Species: T. cervinaria

Binomial name
- Tetracis cervinaria (Packard, 1871)

Synonyms
- Metanema cervinaria Packard, 1871; Metanema aurantiacaria Packard. 1873; Synaxis cervinaria McDunnough, 1938

= Tetracis cervinaria =

Species of moth

Tetracis cervinaria, the Elegant Thorn or Falcate Synaxis, is a North American moth. It has fawn colored wings with two crosslines, falcate wingtips and wing margins that arch to a prominent point mid wing. The moth's name may come from the latin "cervus", meaning 'deer'.

This moth is in the family Geometridae. It was first described by Alpheus Spring Packard in 1871 under the name Metanema cervinaria. It was renamed Synaxis cervinaria in 1938 and was then reclassified in Tetracis in 2010.

== Range and Habitat ==
It is found in western North America from British Columbia to northern California and eastward to Montana, Idaho, Wyoming and Colorado. The southern limit of its range is unclear and sightings in southern coastal California and northern Mexico may be T. australis instead.

== Description ==
Tetracis cervinaria is visually identical to T. australis. These moths are distinguished from similar moths by a nearly straight PM line, a light orange-tan color body, and an early spring-summer flight season. T. australis only differs in genitalic characteristics and geographic range.

This species exhibits sexual dimorphism. The length of the forewings is 19–23 mm. The forewings are strongly falcate with a prominent point at midwing of both fore and hindwing. The crosslines mat be thicker at the wing edge (costal margin) and lower crossline (postmedian line) is mostly straight. The hindwing has one crossline. Males are a tawny or cinnamon-tan color with narrow pale ochre crosslines. Females are a orange or cinnamon shade with well defined, brown or brownish-orange crosslines. Antenna of both sexes are filiform (threadlike).

Ferris and Schmidt give a anatomical description in "Revision of the North American Genera Tetracis...".

"Antenna (both sexes) dorsally white, nearly filiform, densely setose ventrally. Head (except frons), thorax, abdomen, basal and outer marginal areas of wings essentially concolorous; frons and terminal segment of palpi darker. Palpi broad, upcurved, slightly longer than width of eye. Abdomen laterally and ventrally sparsely speckled with individual brown scales. Legs whitish overlaid nonuniformly with dark brown scales defining diffuse bands. Wings: DFW apex strongly falcate; males tawny or cinnamon-tan with narrow pale ochre AM and PM lines with or without dark edging, PM line nearly straight, MB frequently darker; females often orange or cinnamon-rufous with welld efined brown or brownish-orange AM and PM lines with usually darker MB. DHW with nearly straight median line duplicating color of PM line, in some examples there is a distal indistinct convex dark satellite line originating from the top to the middle of the median line; small FW and HW discal dots are present. Ventrally the dorsal markings are repeated to some degree depending upon individual specimens; there is also a widely distributed speckling by dark scales."

== Biology ==
The full life cycle of this moth is not fully known. Adults are nocturnal and on wing from February to June with a few late sightings into July.

The Larva is a twig-mimicing inchworm. The body is light green to greenish-brown, the second thoracic segment is swollen dorsally and there is a small dorsal wart on abdominal segments four and eight. There is one generation per year and the moth overwinters as an egg.

== Host Plants ==
The larvae have been confirmed to feed on Greenleaf Manzanit (Arctostaphylos Patula) and Oregon white oak (Quercus garryana). Additional sources report Willow, Cascara, Bitterbush, Bitter cherry Prunus emarginata and Chokecherry Prunus virginiana, ceanothus, poplar, manzanita and arbutus.

Larva may also feed on plants in the genera Alnus, Arbutus, Arctostaphylos, Ceanothus, Cercocarpus, Chrysolepis, Frangula, Populus, Prunus, Purshia, Quercus, Salix.

== Similar species ==
- Tetracis australis is identical and only separated by geographic range and differences in genitalia.
- Tetracis jubararia and other 'Tetracis' moths are similar but different shaped postmedial lines and are seen later in the summer and fall.
- Eusarca falcata
- Large Maple Spanworm Moth (Prochoerodes lineola)
- Prochoerodes forficaria has wings that are less pointed and a sharp bend in the PM line near the forewing costa.

== Conservation ==
A population in Alberta, Canada was found to be reduced by an estimated 99% in 2006 from a combination of factors including pathogens and predators.

== Photos ==

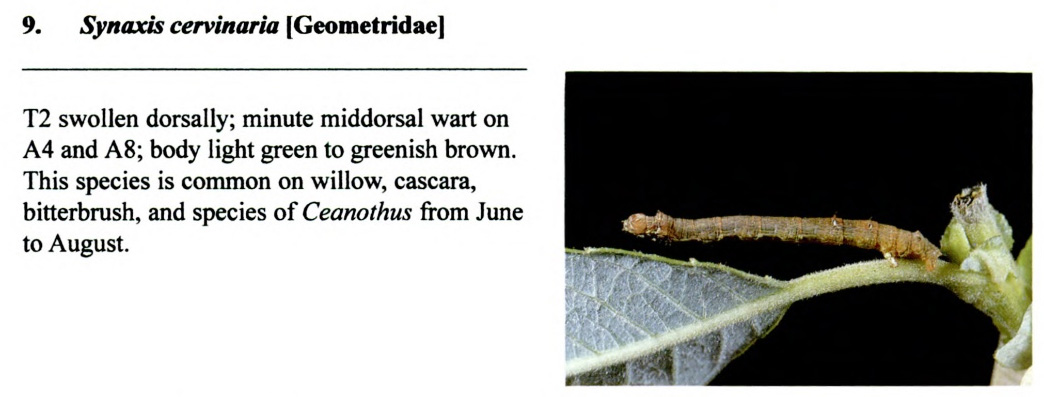
cervinaria caterpillar

== External links with Photos ==
- Bug Guide
- iNaturalist
- Moth Photographers Group

== Additional Reading ==
- Revision of the North American genera Tetracis Guenée and synonymization of Synaxis Hulst with descriptions of three new species By Clifford D. Ferris & B. Christian Schmidt (2010). (Includes Identification key, descriptions, illustrations of genitalia and distribution maps.)(Read online)
- Guide to the Geometridae of Canada (Lepidoptera) II. Subfamily Ennominae by W.C. McGuffin (1987). Memoirs of the Entomological Society of Canada. (Read online)
- Life History and Behavior of Synaxis Cervinaria, a defoliator of Arctostaphylos Patula. Michael Valenti, et al. (1997). (Read online)
