= Tetracis crocallata =

Scientific classification
- Kingdom: Animalia
- Phylum: Arthropoda
- Clade: Pancrustacea
- Class: Insecta
- Order: Lepidoptera
- Family: Geometridae
- Genus: Tetracis
- Species: T. crocallata

Binomial name
- Tetracis crocallata Guenée, [1858]

Synonyms
- Tetracis aspilatata Guenée, [1858]

Species of moth

Tetracis crocallata, the yellow slant-line, is a moth of the family Geometridae. It is widespread across the eastern half of North American, with adults flying in spring and summer. Its yellow color and the shape of its wings give this moth the appearance of an autumn leaf, with the moth's crosslines becoming the leaf's midrib.

The species was first described by Achille Guenée in 1858 under its former name Tetracis aspilatata. The species name, crocallata, comes from the Greek krokos meaning "saffron-yellow".

== Description ==
=== General description ===
- Antenna are thread-like in both sexes.
- Wings are tan, cream or yellow.
- Has wedge-shaped wings with smooth, angled margins.
- Has one straight, brown crossline on both forewing and hindwing.
- Has brown discal spots.
- May be speckled with dark scales.

=== Halotype description ===
Ferris and Schmidt give an anatomical description in "Revision of the North American Genera Tetracis...".

"FWL: 17–25 mm. Antenna (stated as serrate by some authors) basically filiform in both sexes, but in males ventrally minutely setose and weakly fasciculate; ventrally minutely setose in females. Palpi, upcurved, short (about to horizontal midline of eye), yellowish-tan scales on outer side, paler inward. Head, thorax, abdomen, legs, wings concolorous varying across individuals from pale yellowish-white to yellow, with sparse sprinkling of individual brown scales; tarsal spines brown. Wings: DFW yellow or yellowish-white with straight brown transverse PM line from apex to inner margin and brown discal spot; DHW usually with brown discal spot and normally incomplete (sometimes absent) brown transverse median line. Underside as above, but less strongly marked. April specimens from Alabama are often irrorated with dark scales. Kimball (1965, p. 189) mentioned similar maculation in Florida specimens." The publication also describes characteristics of the species' reproductive organs.

=== Identification ===
T. cachexiata and T. crocallata are similar looking moths with overlapping ranges, which can be easily confused. Crocallata, the Yellow slant-line, (despite the name), can also have white, as well as cream, tan or bright yellow colored wings. The wings are often speckled with small brown spots. It has a straight, bold, dark brown crossline and small brown discal spots. In comparison Cachexiata, the White slant-line, may be pale yellow or pure white with no speckling. The crossline is light brown or golden and it has no discal spots.

== Life Cycle ==
Adults are nocturnal and fly in spring and fall, depending upon locality. It overwinters as a pupa. There are two generations a year in the population in New York, with adults flying May to August. On Canada's Block Island, adults are seen in late May to early July, with a partial second generation emerging in August.

The caterpillars are twig-mimicing inchworms. They have several shallow warts on the thorax and abdomen. The larva's color is extremely variable, and may be grey, tan, brown or brick red."

Entomologist Pedro Barbosa gives this description of the larva; "Young instars have a brown head and green body with white intersegmental membranes; older instars have two morphs: (A) reddish-brown with 2 pairs dorsal and 2-3 pairs lateral white tubercles; T1 with forward projections tipped white (B) light brown to gray with no white tubercles; T1 projections present, but not white; morph B is similar to A. pampinaria but has no dorsal tubercles on A7."

== Host Plants ==
- Eastern USA larvae are recorded to feed on (Alder) Alnus, (Chestnut) Castanea and (Willow) Salix trees.
- Massachusetts' populations are reported to feed on Alnus (Alder), Castanea dentata (American Chestnut), Lindera benzoin (Northern Spicebush), Rhus (Sumac), Salix (Willow), Sambucus nigra (Black Elderberry).

== Range and Habitat ==
It is found in a wide variety of environments across North America from Alberta to Nova Scotia, down the eastern seaboard to northern Florida, across the midwest US and as far west as the eastern edge of Nebraska and Texas.

There have been confirmed specimens collected from MB, NS, and QC in Canada. And in the United States from AL, AR, CT, FL, GA, IN, IL, IA, KS, KY, LA, MA, MI, MD, ME, MN, MS, MI, NE, NH, NJ, NY, NC, OH, PA, SC, SD, TN, TX, VT, VA, and WI.

== Similar species ==
- White Slant-line Moth (Tetracis cachexiata)
- Confused Eusarca Moth (Eusarca confusaria)
- Large Maple Spanworm Moth (Prochoerodes lineola)
- Speckled Lamplighter Moth (Lychnosea intermicata)

== Additional Reading ==
- Revision of the North American genera Tetracis Guenée and synonymization of Synaxis Hulst with descriptions of three new species By Clifford D. Ferris & B. Christian Schmidt (2010). (Includes Identification key, descriptions, illustrations of genitalia and distribution maps.)(Read online)

== External links with Photos ==
- Bug Guide
- iNaturalist
- Moths of North Carolina
- Moth Photography Group

== Photos ==
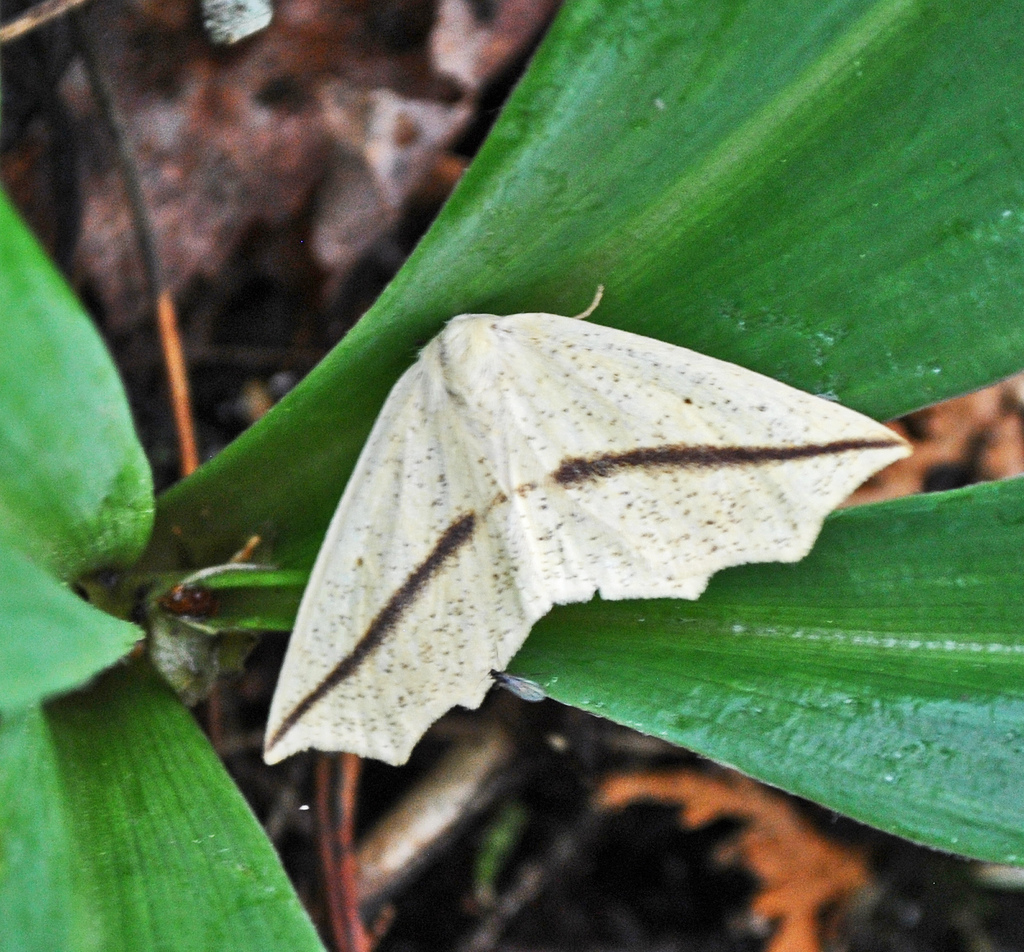
Tetracis crocallata

Tetracis crocallata
