= Besma endropiaria =

Scientific classification
- Kingdom: Animalia
- Phylum: Arthropoda
- Class: Insecta
- Order: Lepidoptera
- Family: Geometridae
- Tribe: Ourapterygini
- Genus: Besma
- Species: B. endropiaria

Binomial name
- Besma endropiaria (Grote & Robinson, 1867)

Synonyms
- Therina fatuaria Strecker, 1899

Species of moth

Besma endropiaria, the straw besma, is a species of geometrid moth in the family Geometridae.

The MONA or Hodges number for Besma endropiaria is 6884.
