= Besma rubritincta =

Scientific classification
- Domain: Eukaryota
- Kingdom: Animalia
- Phylum: Arthropoda
- Class: Insecta
- Order: Lepidoptera
- Family: Geometridae
- Tribe: Ourapterygini
- Genus: Besma
- Species: B. rubritincta

Binomial name
- Besma rubritincta (Cassino & Swett, 1925)

Synonyms
- Sabulodes rubritincta nigripuncta Cassino and Swett, 1925

Species of moth

Besma rubritincta is a species of geometrid moth in the family Geometridae. It is found in North America.

The MONA or Hodges number for Besma rubritincta is 6886.
