= Destutia flumenata =

Scientific classification
- Domain: Eukaryota
- Kingdom: Animalia
- Phylum: Arthropoda
- Class: Insecta
- Order: Lepidoptera
- Family: Geometridae
- Tribe: Ourapterygini
- Genus: Destutia
- Species: D. flumenata

Binomial name
- Destutia flumenata (Pearsall, 1906)

Species of moth

Destutia flumenata is a species of moth in the family Geometridae first described by Pearsall in 1906. It is found in North America.

The MONA or Hodges number for Destutia flumenata is 6880.
