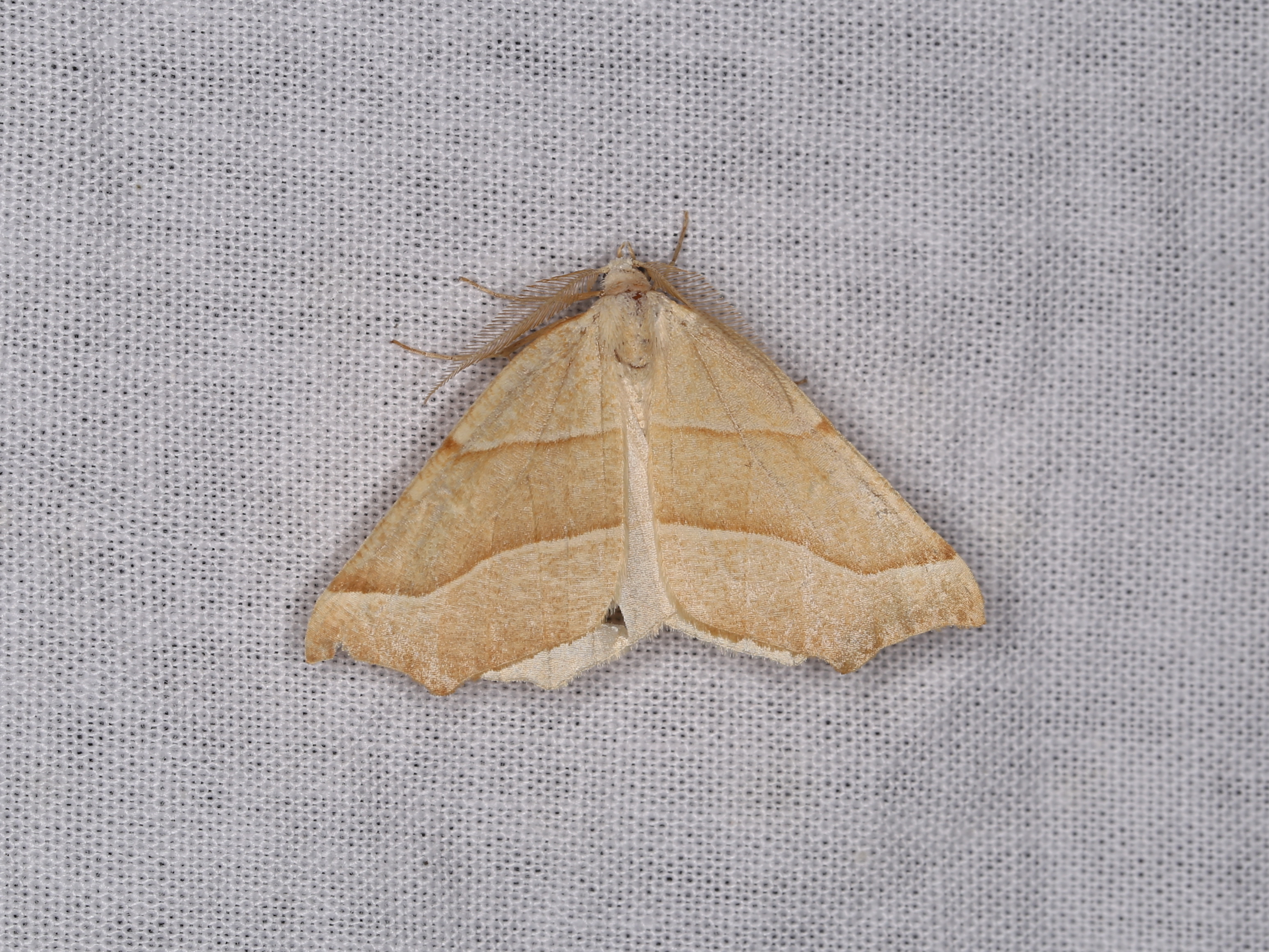

Scientific classification
- Kingdom: Animalia
- Phylum: Arthropoda
- Clade: Pancrustacea
- Class: Insecta
- Order: Lepidoptera
- Family: Geometridae
- Genus: Pherne
- Species: P. subpunctata

Binomial name
- Pherne subpunctata (Hulst, 1898)

= Pherne subpunctata =

Species of moth

Pherne subpunctata is a species of geometrid moth in the family Geometridae. It is found in North America.
