= Prochoerodes truxaliata =

Scientific classification
- Kingdom: Animalia
- Phylum: Arthropoda
- Clade: Pancrustacea
- Class: Insecta
- Order: Lepidoptera
- Family: Geometridae
- Tribe: Ourapterygini
- Genus: Prochoerodes
- Species: P. truxaliata

Binomial name
- Prochoerodes truxaliata (Boisduval and Guenée, 1858)

Species of moth

Prochoerodes truxaliata is a species of moth in the family Geometridae. It is native to southwestern North America where is feeds exclusivity on Baccharis. It has been studied as and used for biological control for invasive plants in Australia.

=== Distribution ===
This species is found in southwest United States including: California, Colorado, Utah, New Mexico, Nevada, Oregon and Arizona. It has been intentionally introduced to Australia. Larvae are found through out the year and there are three generation of adult moths each year.

- Shropshire lists flight season as mid-May to August.
- BugGuide lists sightings mostly from April to November.

=== Description ===
Prochoerodes truxaliata was first described by Achille Guenée, in 1858, under the name Tetracis truxaliata.

TETRACIS TRUXALIATA
Original species description by Achille Guenée in 1858.
"40mm. Ailes supérieures à côte creusée avant l'apex, d'un ochracé saupoudré de ferrugineux, surtout sur l'espace médian, avec trois lignes ou ombres noirâtres, éclairées de gris et mal arrêtées, l'une (extrabasilaire) à peine arquée, la seconde (coudée) plus écartée dans le haut, mais ne se di- rigeant pas vers l'apex, la troisième (subterminale) parallèle au bord et mal marquée. Ailes inférieures plus claires, avec un point cellulaire noir et une teinte roussâtre au bord terminal. Dessous concolore et sans dessin. Palpes plus saillants que chez les autres espèces. pius grande (48mm), d'un jaune d'ocre pâle, sans atomes roux les ailes inférieures d'un jaune-paille, sans dessins.

Californie. Un d, une 9. Coll. Bdv.

Cette espèce diffère un peu des autres Tetracis par les dessins; les palpes, et le front qui est un peu plus saillant."
Translation
"40 mm. Forewings with a concave indentation along the costa before the apex; colored an ochre shade dusted with ferruginous—especially in the median area—and featuring three blackish lines or shadows. These markings are highlighted with gray and are somewhat indistinct: the first (extrabasilar) is barely arched; the second (angled) is more widely spaced toward the top but does not point toward the apex; the third (subterminal) runs parallel to the outer margin and is poorly defined. Hindwings are paler, with a black discal spot and a reddish tint along the outer margin. The underside is uniform in color and lacks any markings. The palpi are more prominent than in other species. A larger specimen (48 mm) is pale ochre-yellow, lacking any reddish speckling, with straw-yellow hindwings that are devoid of markings.

California. One male, one female. Collection of Boisduval.

This species differs somewhat from other 'Tetracis' in its markings, its palpi, and its frons, which is slightly more prominent."

=== Biology ===
Female moths lay eggs on or under their host plant. Newly laid eggs are pale green (but turn brown), nearly spherical, smooth and glossy. Eggs hatch in 8-10 days and evolve through multiple intermediate growth stages. Fully grown caterpillars are 40-45 mm long.

The mature caterpillar is describes by Palmer, et al. as...

"...irregularly dotted with dull black, the dots coalescing to form poorly defined dorsal and lateral stripes. Sub-dorsal pale lines bordered the dorsal stripe, and two irregular light lines extended laterally, forming a margin to the lateral stripe. The first thoracic and abdominal spiracles were orange, often with blue centers. A pair of short fleshy protuberances was present on the fourth abdominal tergite, and there were indications of a second pair of protuberances on the fifth segment."

The larva feed on plants in the genus Baccharis, including Baccharis pilularis (Coyote brush). This species is multivoltine, producing three generations per year. In a lab study, adult moths emerged in early April, again in mid-summer, and a third generation of moths flew in October. The full life cycle of this species is described in detail in the paper, "Host specificity and biology of prochoerodes-truxaliata..." (1987). (Read online)

=== Biological Control ===
It has also been released in Australia for the biological control of (Baccharis halimifolia).

=== Similar Species ===
- Tetracis hirsutaria
- Sabulodes aegrotata

== External links and images ==
- Bug Guide
- Ecdysis arthropod collections
- Moth Photography Group
