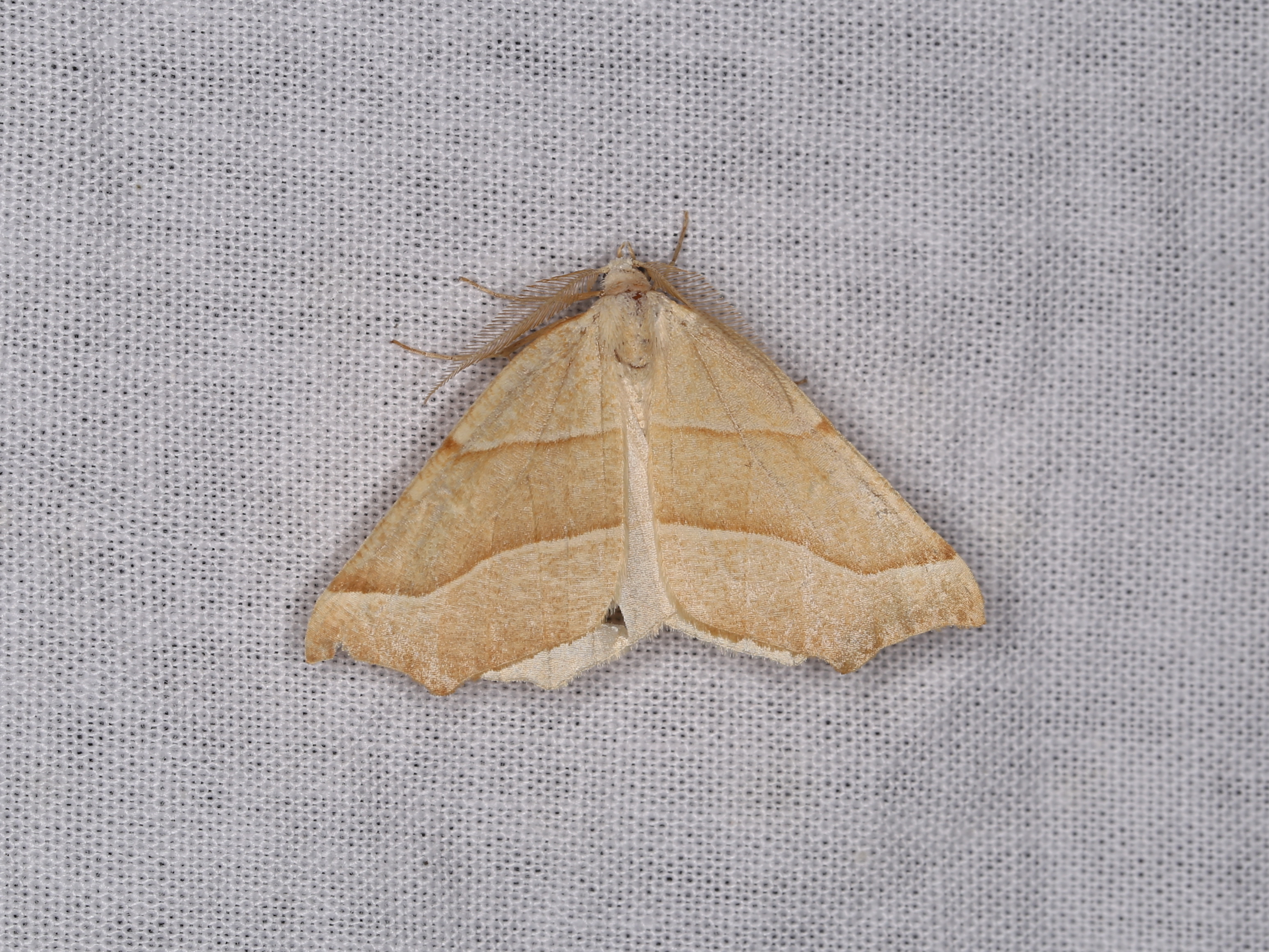
- Image of Pherne subpunctata

Scientific classification
- Kingdom: Animalia
- Phylum: Arthropoda
- Class: Insecta
- Order: Lepidoptera
- Family: Geometridae
- Tribe: Ourapterygini
- Genus: Pherne; Hulst, 1896

= Pherne =

Genus of moths

Pherne is a genus of moths in the family Geometridae described by George Duryea Hulst in 1896.

== Species ==
- Pherne parallelia (Packard, 1873)
- Pherne placeraria (Guenée, 1857)
- Pherne sperryi McDunnough, 1935
- Pherne subpunctata (Hulst, 1898)
