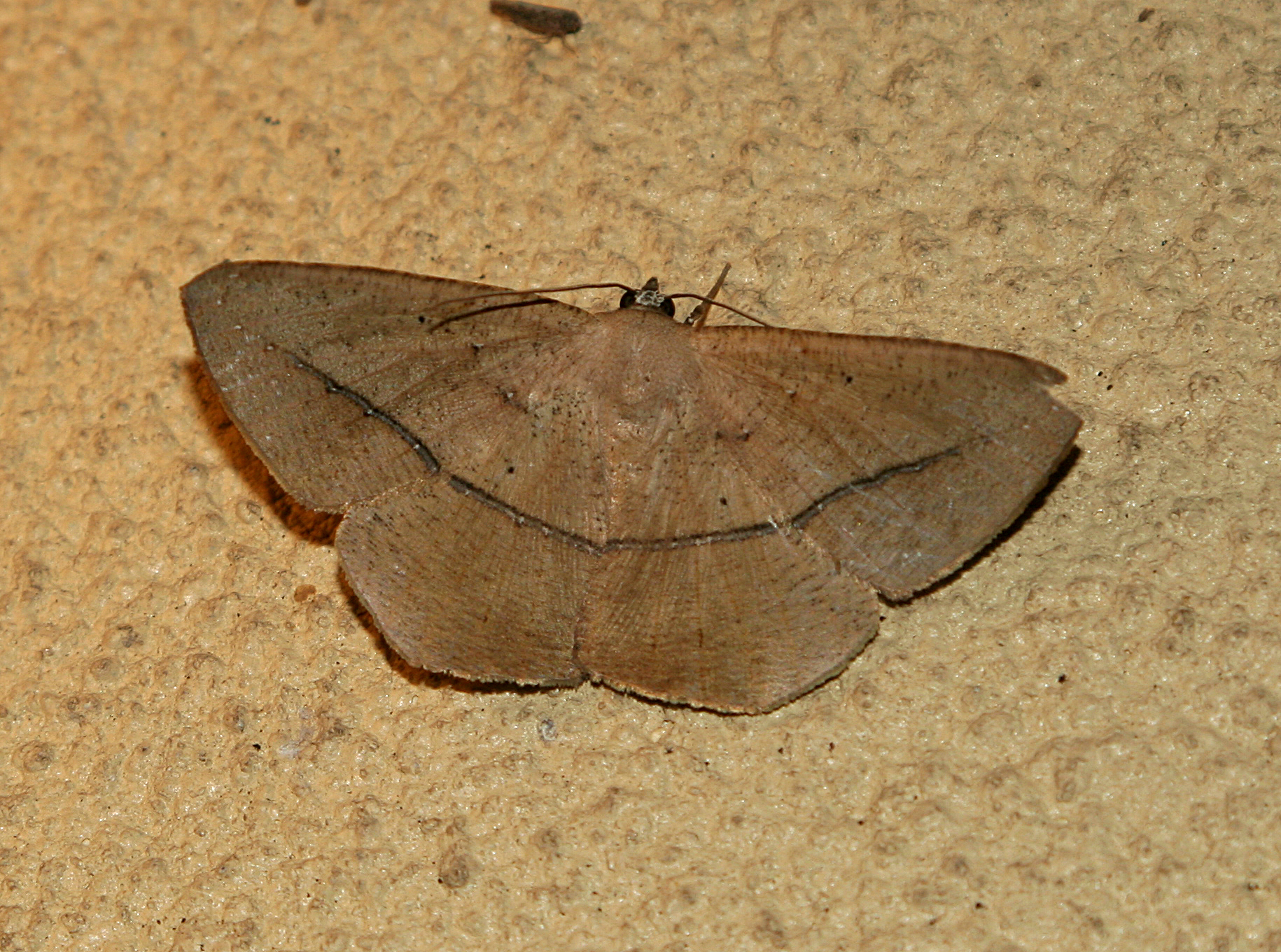
- The Prochoerodes olivata moth

Scientific classification
- Domain: Eukaryota
- Kingdom: Animalia
- Phylum: Arthropoda
- Class: Insecta
- Order: Lepidoptera
- Family: Geometridae
- Genus: Prochoerodes
- Species: P. olivata

Binomial name
- Prochoerodes olivata (Warren, 1904)

= Prochoerodes olivata =

Species of moth

Prochoerodes olivata is a species of geometrid moth in the family Geometridae. It is found in Central America and North America.

The MONA or Hodges number for Prochoerodes olivata is 6983.
