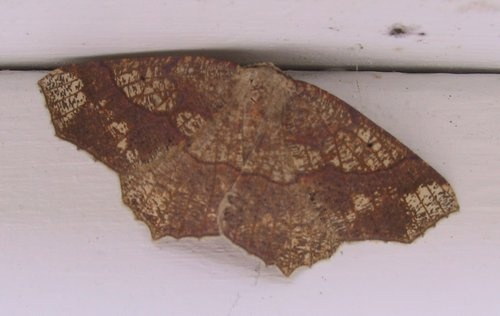
- Oak besma (Besma quercivoraria)

Scientific classification
- Domain: Eukaryota
- Kingdom: Animalia
- Phylum: Arthropoda
- Class: Insecta
- Order: Lepidoptera
- Family: Geometridae
- Tribe: Ourapterygini
- Genus: Besma; Capps, 1943

= Besma =

Genus of moths

Besma is a genus of moths in the family Geometridae.

== Species ==
- Besma endropiaria (Grote & Robinson, 1867) – straw besma
- Besma quercivoraria (Guenée, 1857) – oak besma
- Besma rubritincta (Cassino & Swett, 1925)
- Besma sesquilinearia (Grote, 1883)
