= Tetracis fuscata =

Scientific classification
- Kingdom: Animalia
- Phylum: Arthropoda
- Clade: Pancrustacea
- Class: Insecta
- Order: Lepidoptera
- Family: Geometridae
- Genus: Tetracis
- Species: T. fuscata

Binomial name
- Tetracis fuscata (Hulst, 1898)

Synonyms
- Synaxis fuscata Hulst, 1898

Species of moth

Tetracis fuscata is a moth of the family Geometridae first described by George Duryea Hulst in 1898. It is only known from the US states of Colorado and Wyoming. Fuscata means "darkened," "dusky," or "brownish".

== Description ==
- The length of the forewings 19–23 mm.
- Antenna are filiform in both sexes.
- Grayish-brown color (Speckled throughout with dark scales over a light brown ground.)
- Antimedia line is curved.
- Postmdial line abruptly bends midwing, so that the median band is much wider at the costal margin.

== Distribution ==
It has a limited range, with confirmed reports in Colorado and Wyoming. Adults are generally on wing from late August to September.

== Similar Species ==
- Tetracis montanaria
- Lambdina phantoma
