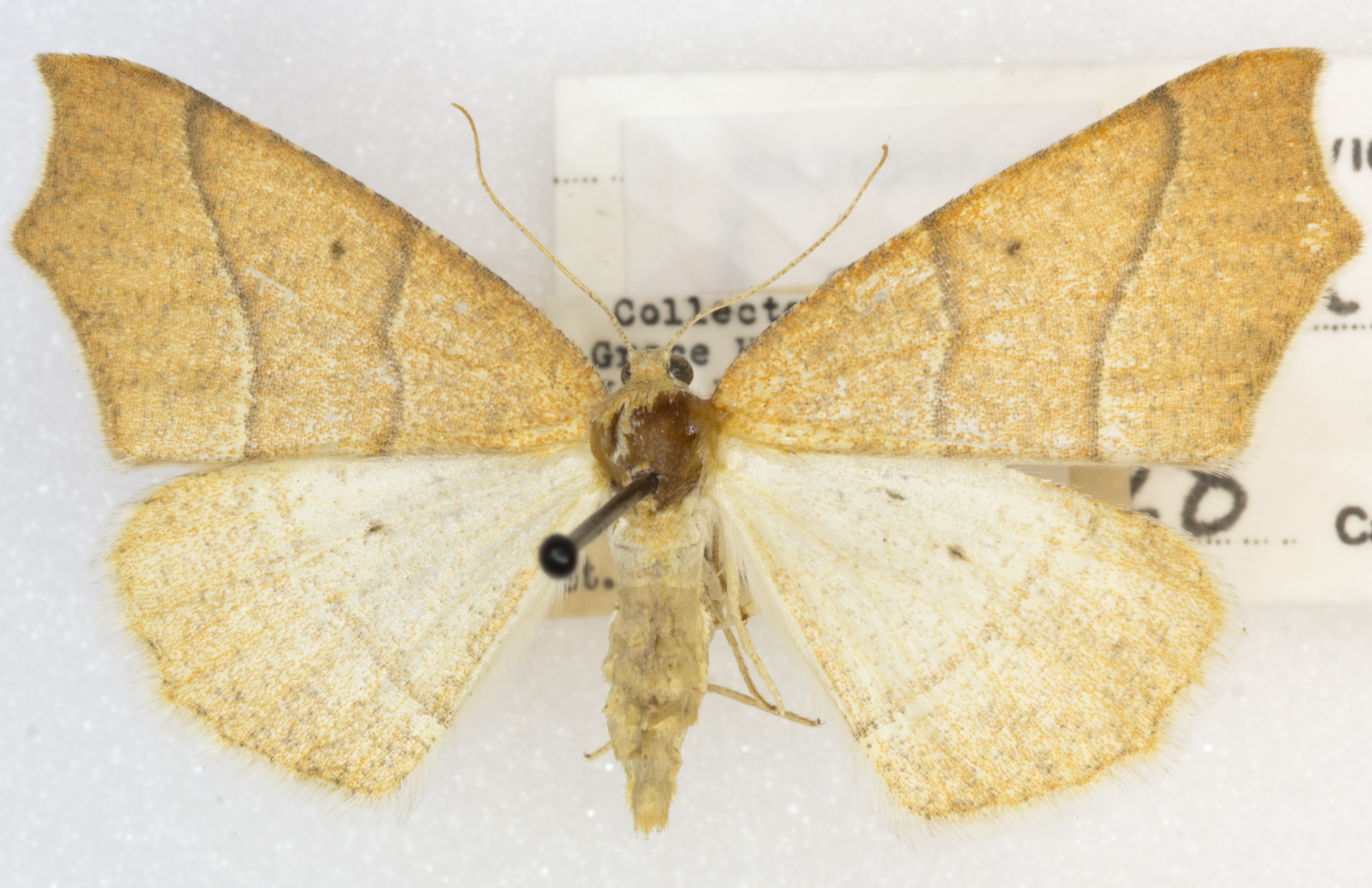

Scientific classification
- Kingdom: Animalia
- Phylum: Arthropoda
- Clade: Pancrustacea
- Class: Insecta
- Order: Lepidoptera
- Family: Geometridae
- Tribe: Ourapterygini
- Genus: Destutia
- Species: D. excelsa

Binomial name
- Destutia excelsa (Strecker in Ruffner, 1878)

= Destutia excelsa =

Species of moth

Destutia excelsa is a species of moth in the family Geometridae found in the southwestern United States. It was first described by Strecker in 1878.

The MONA or Hodges number for Destutia excelsa is 6883.

== Distribution ==
Southwest US; Arizona to western Texas and north to Utah and Colorado. Adults fly mid-May to August.

== Subspecies ==
Three subspecies belong to Destutia excelsa:

- Destutia excelsa excelsa (Strecker in Ruffner, 1878)^{i g}
- Destutia excelsa olivata (Barnes & McDunnough, 1917)^{i}
- Destutia excelsa simpliciaria (Grote, 1883)^{i g}

Data sources: i = ITIS, c = Catalogue of Life, g = GBIF, b = BugGuide

== Similar Species ==
- Tetracis jubararia and other Tetracis moths.
