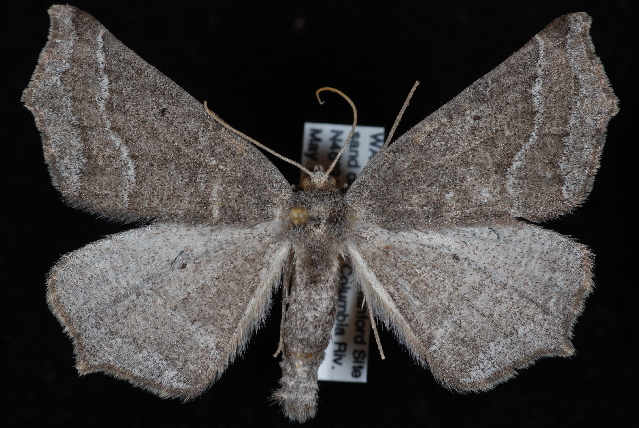

Scientific classification
- Domain: Eukaryota
- Kingdom: Animalia
- Phylum: Arthropoda
- Class: Insecta
- Order: Lepidoptera
- Family: Geometridae
- Tribe: Ourapterygini
- Genus: Prochoerodes
- Species: P. amplicineraria

Binomial name
- Prochoerodes amplicineraria (Pearsall, 1906)

= Prochoerodes amplicineraria =

Species of moth

Prochoerodes amplicineraria is a species of geometrid moth in the family Geometridae. It is found in North America.

The MONA or Hodges number for Prochoerodes amplicineraria is 6978.
