= Pherne sperryi =

Scientific classification
- Domain: Eukaryota
- Kingdom: Animalia
- Phylum: Arthropoda
- Class: Insecta
- Order: Lepidoptera
- Family: Geometridae
- Tribe: Ourapterygini
- Genus: Pherne
- Species: P. sperryi

Binomial name
- Pherne sperryi McDunnough, 1935

Species of moth

Pherne sperryi is a species of geometrid moth in the family Geometridae. It is found in North America.

The MONA or Hodges number for Pherne sperryi is 6951.
