= Tetracis australis =

Scientific classification
- Kingdom: Animalia
- Phylum: Arthropoda
- Clade: Pancrustacea
- Class: Insecta
- Order: Lepidoptera
- Family: Geometridae
- Genus: Tetracis
- Species: T. australis

Binomial name
- Tetracis australis Ferris, 2009

Species of moth

Likely T. australis. San Diego, CA

Tetracis australis is a moth of the family Geometridae, found on the west coast of North America. The species was first described by Clifford D. Ferris in 2010.

It can be recognized by its fawn color, wing margins that come to a single point and a nearly straight postmedial line. The length of the forewings 19–23 mm. Adults have an early flight season from around March to late June. T. australist is visually indistinguishable from Tetracis cervinaria, but there is enough genetic variation for this moth to be considered a separate species. The two species differ in geographic range and male genitalic characteristics. (See T. cervinaria for a more detailed description.)

The larvae may feed on Quercus and Populus species.

== Distribution ==
This species has a very limited geographic range. It is only found on the coast of North America in southern California from Monterey County south to Baja California, Mexico. In California it has been recorded in the counties of: Los Angeles, Monterey, Orange, Riverside, San Bernardino, San Diego, San Luis Obispo, Santa Barbara and Baja Caifornia Norte, in Mexico. It is found in pine-oak-manzanita habitats at altitudes from near sea level to 2,135 meters.
