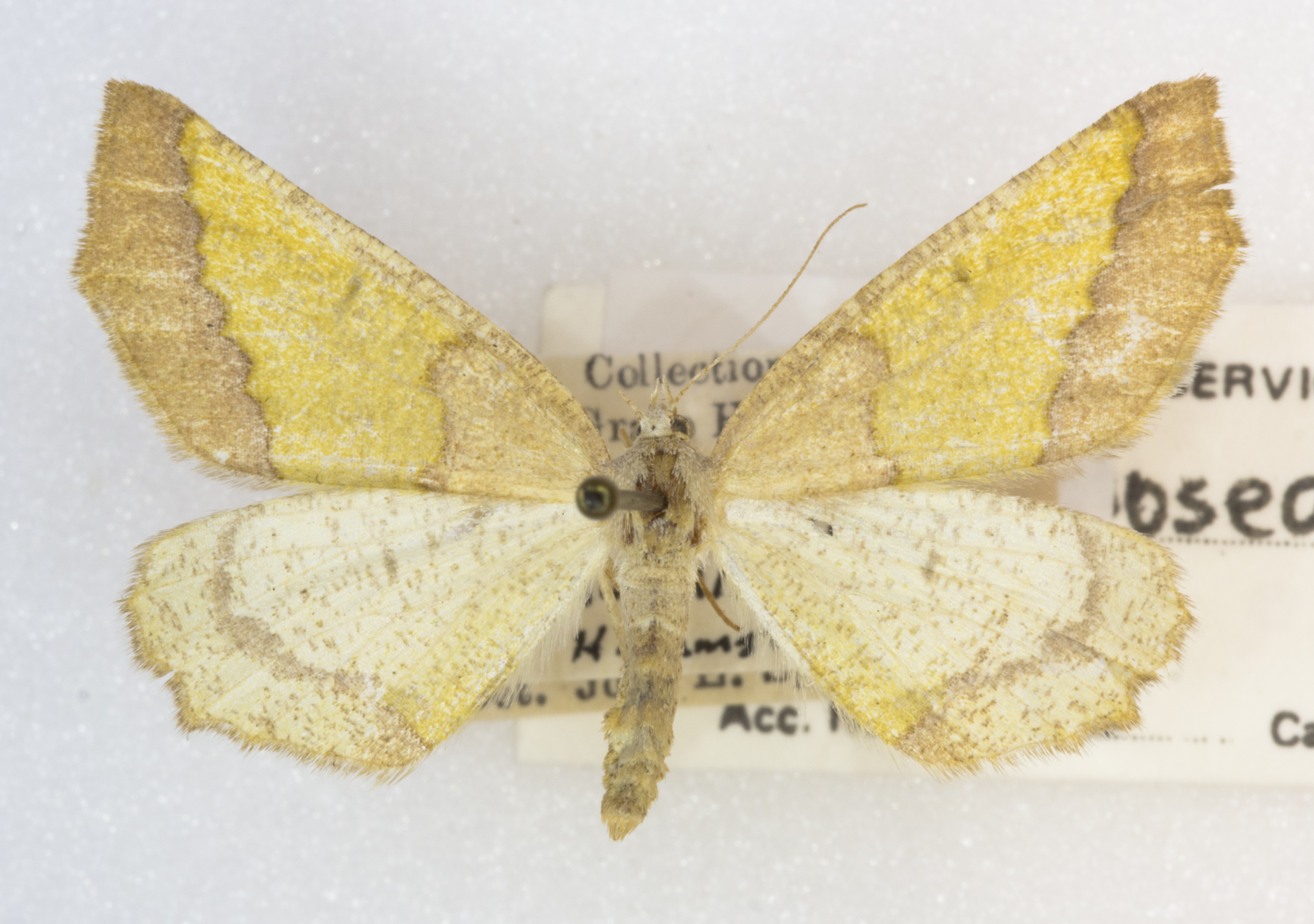
- Lychnosea helveolaria in the Grand Canyon Museum

Scientific classification
- Domain: Eukaryota
- Kingdom: Animalia
- Phylum: Arthropoda
- Class: Insecta
- Order: Lepidoptera
- Family: Geometridae
- Tribe: Ourapterygini
- Genus: Lychnosea; Grote, 1883

= Lychnosea =

Genus of moths

Lychnosea is a genus of moths in the family Geometridae erected by Augustus Radcliffe Grote in 1883.

== Species ==
- Lychnosea helveolaria (Hulst, 1881)
- Lychnosea intermicata (Walker, 1862)
