= Tetracis cachexiata =

White slant-line

Scientific classification
- Kingdom: Animalia
- Phylum: Arthropoda
- Clade: Pancrustacea
- Class: Insecta
- Order: Lepidoptera
- Family: Geometridae
- Genus: Tetracis
- Species: T. cachexiata

Binomial name
- Tetracis cachexiata Guenée,1858

Synonyms
- Tetracis lorata Grote,1864

Species of moth

Tetracis cachexiata, the White slant-line (also called the "White slaut" and the "Mayapple moth"), is a moth of the family Geometridae. It is widespread across much of North American. Adults fly in May to July, peaking in June. The species was described by Achille Guenée in 1857.

== Description ==
=== General description ===
- Wingspan 34-50mm, forewing length 18-26mm
- Antenna are thread-like in both sexes.
- Wings are white or creamy-white.
- Has wedge-shaped wings with somewhat falcate forewings and rounded hindwings.
- Has one thin, straight, brown crossline on forewing.
- No discal spots.
- Hindwings solid white or cream with no markings.

=== Halotype description ===
Ferris and Schmidt give an anatomical description in "Revision of the North American Genera Tetracis...".

"FWL: 19–26 mm. Antenna (stated as prismatic by some authors) essentially filiform, ventrally minutely setose, thinner in females. Palpi, upcurved, short (about to horizontal midline of eye), tan scales on outer side, paler inward. Head, thorax, abdomen, legs, wings concolorous varying across individuals from white to creamy-white; tarsal spines brown. Wings: DFW with thin straight brown transverse PM line from apex to inner margin (sometimes indistinct) discal spot absent; DHW unmarked. Underside unmaculated." The publication also describes characteristics of the species' reproductive organs.

=== Identification ===
T. cachexiata and T. crocallata are similar looking moths with overlapping ranges, which can be easily confused. Crocallata, the Yellow slant-line, (despite the name), can also have white, as well as cream, tan or bright yellow colored wings. The wings are often speckled with small brown spots. It has a straight, bold, dark brown crossline and small brown discal spots. In comparison Cachexiata, the White slant-line, may be pale yellow or pure white with no speckling. The crossline is light brown or golden and it has no discal spots.

== Life Cycle ==
Adults fly in May to July, depending upon locality. It overwinters as a pupa.

- In Canadian populations larvae feed from early June to late September. Pupation occurs from July to mid-August and adults fly in September or May.
- On Canada's Block Island, adults were only observed in June.
- In Alberta Canada, adults fly in mid to late June.
- In Minnesota populations there is one brood a year in late May to late July.

The caterpillars are stick mimicing inchworms. Along with the color and texture, a conspicuously thickened second thoracic segment gives the caterpillar the appearance of a broken twig. The Canadian Forest Service describes the mature larva as "up to 45 mm long. Head is small, flattened, dull yellowish white with dark markings. Body is brown to grey and variously marked with repeating middorsal hourglass pattern. Body slim, wider from segments 6-9. Second thoracic segment with a pair of large angular lateral swellings and small addorsal tubercles. Both abdominal segments 4 and 5 have a pair of subdorsal tubercles."

== Host Plants ==
Caterpillars are polyphagous generalists feeding on a wide range of hardwood, conifers, shrubs and plants. The larvae are "innocuous solitary defoliators", browsing on leaves while not significantly harming the host plant.

- Ferris records hosts including Alnus, Betula, Prunus, Salix, Tilia, Ulmus, Viburnum, Abies, Larix, Pinus, Tsuga.
- Canadian population are reported to feed on Douglas-fir, tamarack and white spruce. As well as white birch, trembling aspen and willow. (A full list of host plants is listed at Natural Resources Canada.)
- Hosts of Alberta's population include alder (Alnus), birch (Betula), cherry (Prunus), poplar (Populus), Viburnum and willow (Salix).
- Hosts plants of the North Carolina population are list at Moths of North Carolina.

Adult White Slant-lines feed on nectar and have been observed on flowers including Milkweeds, Phlox, Dogwood and Dame’s rocket. They may play a minor role in pollination.

T. cachexiata is often photographed resting on Pink Lady's Slipper (Cypripedium acaule) orchids and congregating on Mayapple (Podophyllum peltatum) blooms. Since these flowers do not produce nectar the relationship between the plant and moth is unclear.

== Range and Habitat ==
This species is found in a variety of habitats including Boreal forest, montane and piedmont. It is found in forests, river valleys and prairies across North America from Nova Scotia to central British Columbia Canada, and in the US along the eastern seaboard from Maine to Florida and across the midwest. Less frequently it is reported further west as far as Montana and Colorado.

== Conservation ==
The University of Alberta reports that "extensive surveying in recent years has failed to turn up T. cachexiata in the central Boreal forest region" of Alberta, where it previously was known. But was still being sighted in river valleys of Alberta's southern prairies.

== Similar species ==
- Yellow Slant-line Moth (Tetracis crocallata)
- Elm Spanworm Moth (Ennomos subsignaria)
- White Spring Moth (Lomographa vestaliata)

== Photos ==
Cachexiara moth on a Lady Slipper

Tetracis cachexiata

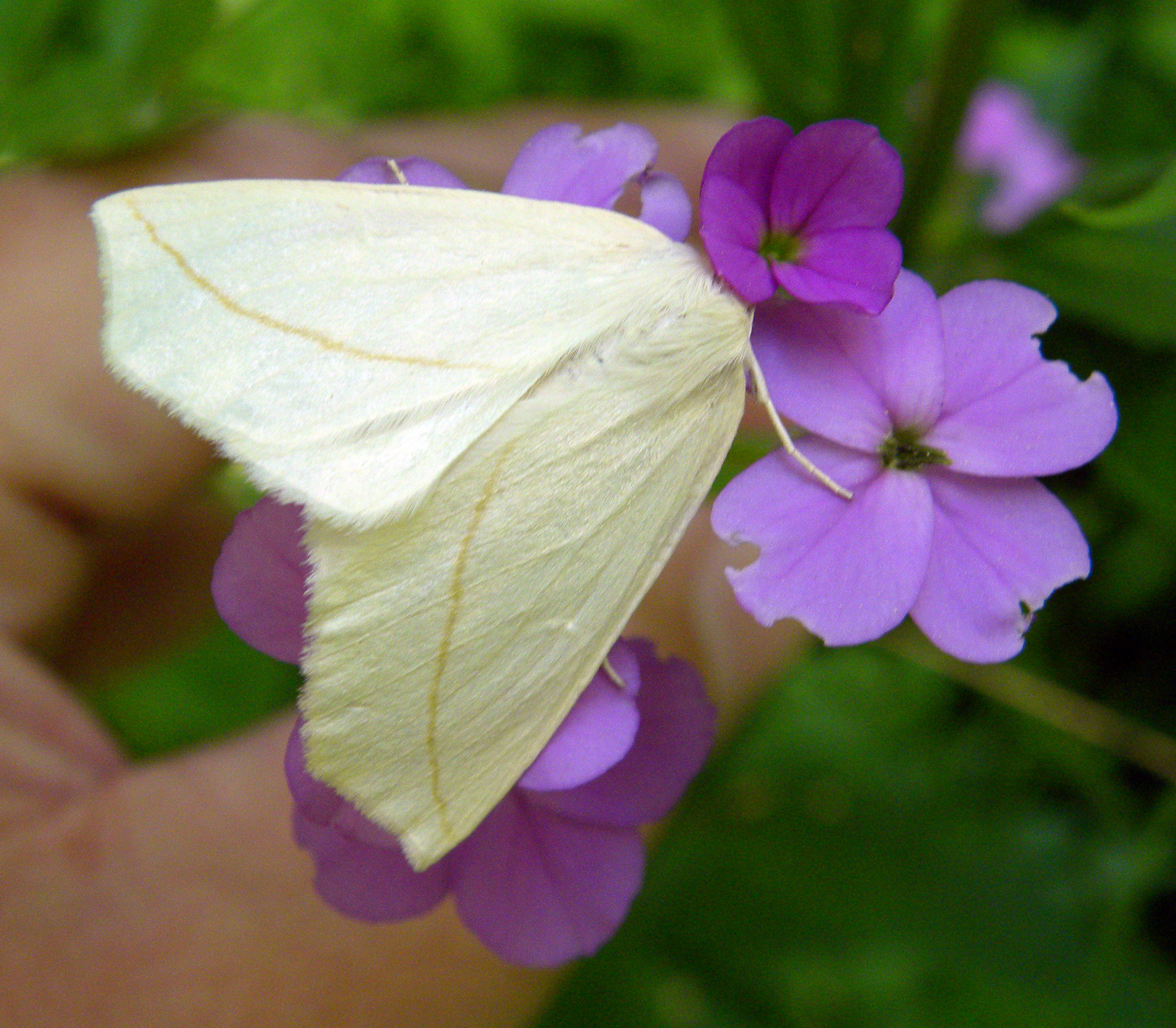
Tetracis cachexiata

Cachexiara moth on flower

Cachexiara closeup

Yellow T. cachexiara

== External links with Photos ==
- Bug Guide
- iNaturalist
- Moths of North Carolina
- Natural Resources Canada

== Additional Reading ==
- Revision of the North American genera Tetracis Guenée and synonymization of Synaxis Hulst with descriptions of three new species By Clifford D. Ferris & B. Christian Schmidt (2010). (Includes Identification key, descriptions, illustrations of genitalia and distribution maps.)(Read online)
- The poem "The Moths" by Mary Oliver
