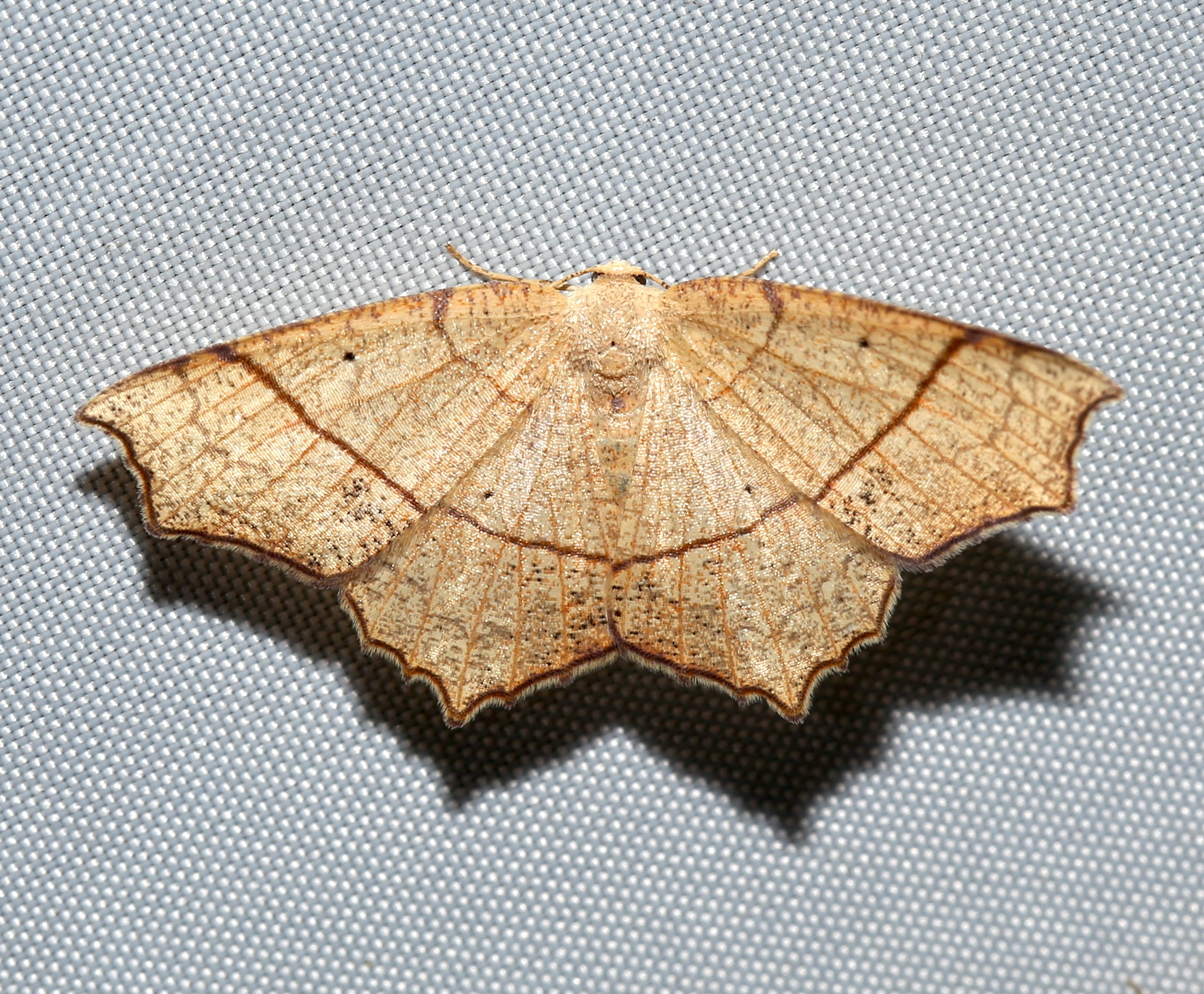
- Female
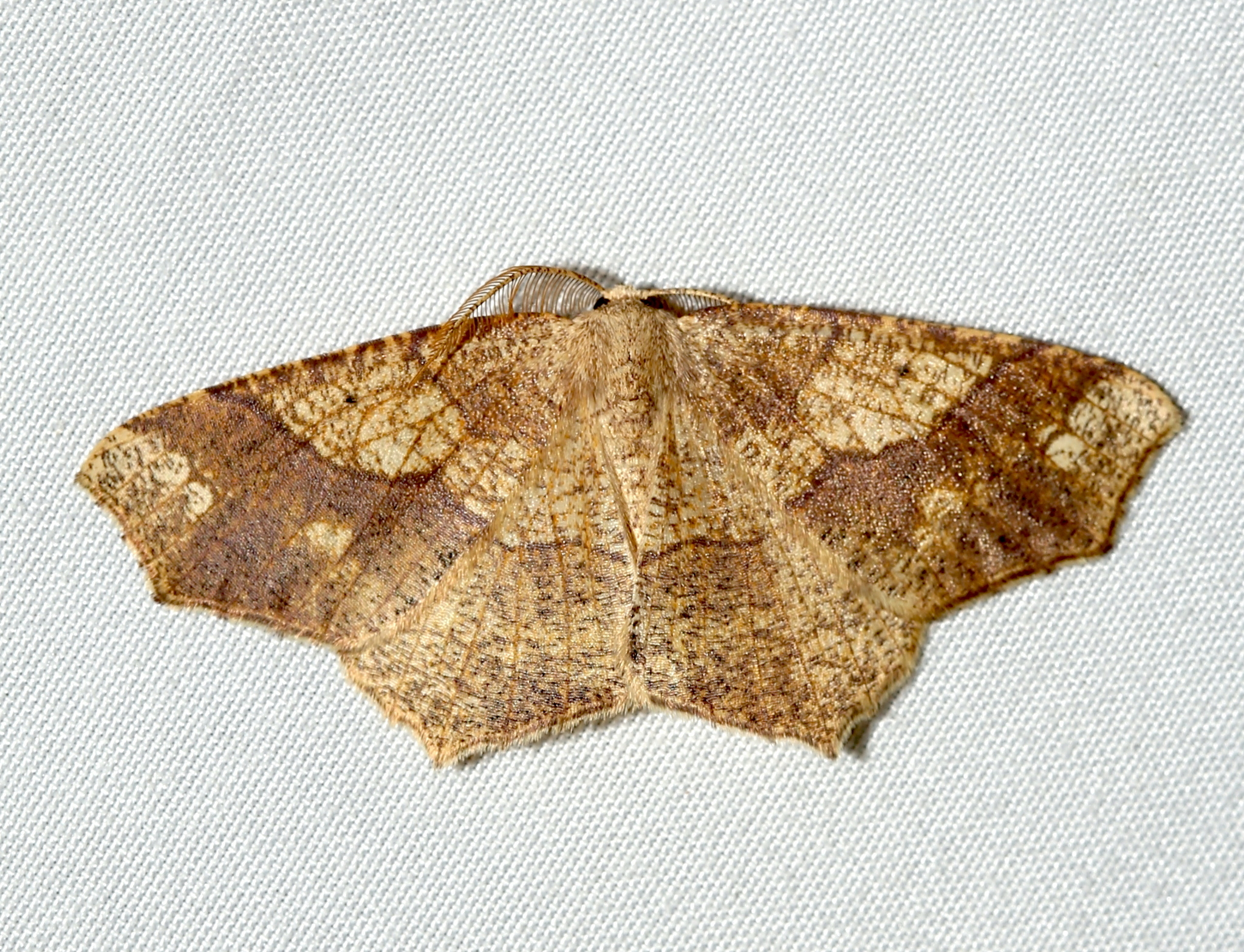
- Male

Scientific classification
- Kingdom: Animalia
- Phylum: Arthropoda
- Class: Insecta
- Order: Lepidoptera
- Family: Geometridae
- Genus: Besma
- Species: B. quercivoraria

Binomial name
- Besma quercivoraria (Guenée, 1857)

Synonyms
- Metanema quercivoraria Guenée, 1857; Besma aeliaria (Walker, 1860); Besma textrinaria (Grote & Robinson, 1867); Besma trilinearia (Packard, 1876); Besma incongruaria (Hulst, 1887)

= Besma quercivoraria =

Oak besma

Species of moth

Besma quercivoraria, the oak besma, is a moth of the family Geometridae. The species was first described by Achille Guenée in 1857. It is found across southern Canada (from Newfoundland to British Columbia) and all of the United States except California.

Adults are sexually dimorphic.

The wingspan is 27–41 mm. Adults are on wing from April to September in the south, from May to August in Ontario and from late May to July in Alberta. There are two generations per year.

The larvae feed on the leaves of oak, elm, poplar, willow, Picea glauca, and mostly Betula papyrifera in southern Canada.
