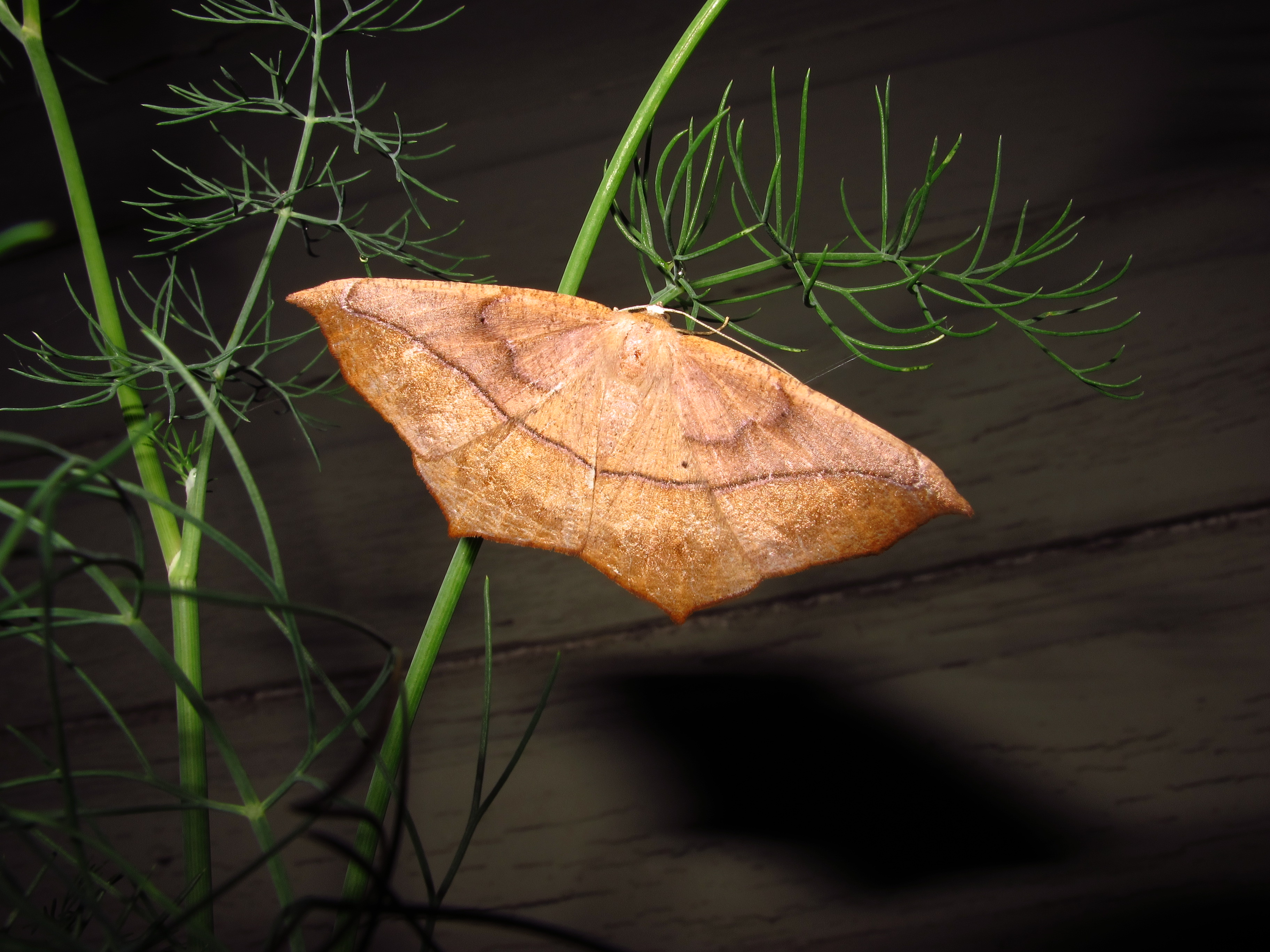
- Prochoerodes lineola

Scientific classification
- Kingdom: Animalia
- Phylum: Arthropoda
- Class: Insecta
- Order: Lepidoptera
- Family: Geometridae
- Tribe: Ourapterygini
- Genus: Prochoerodes; Grote, 1883

Synonyms
- Choerodes Guenée, 1857 (preocc.); Aeschropteryx Butler, 1883

= Prochoerodes =

Genus of moths

Prochoerodes is a genus of moths in the family Geometridae erected by Augustus Radcliffe Grote in 1883.

== Species ==
- Prochoerodes accentuata
- Prochoerodes amplicineraria
- Prochoerodes artemon
- Prochoerodes completaria
- Prochoerodes costipunctaria
- Prochoerodes cristata
- Prochoerodes exiliata
- Prochoerodes flexilinea
- Prochoerodes fleximargo
- Prochoerodes forficaria
- Prochoerodes gibbosa
- Prochoerodes lineola
- Prochoerodes marciana
- Prochoerodes martina
- Prochoerodes nonangulata
- Prochoerodes olivata
- Prochoerodes onustaria
- Prochoerodes pilosa
- Prochoerodes striata
- Prochoerodes tetragonata
- Prochoerodes transpectans
- Prochoerodes transtincta
- Prochoerodes truxaliata
