= Destutia =

Scientific classification
- Kingdom: Animalia
- Phylum: Arthropoda
- Clade: Pancrustacea
- Class: Insecta
- Order: Lepidoptera
- Family: Geometridae
- Subfamily: Ennominae
- Tribe: Ourapterygini
- Genus: Destutia; Grossbeck, 1908

Genus of moths

Destutia is a genus of moths in the family Geometridae.

== Species ==
- Destutia excelsa (Strecker, 1878)
- Destutia flumenata (Pearsall, 1906)
- Destutia novata Grossbeck, 1908
- Destutia oblentaria (Grote, 1883)
