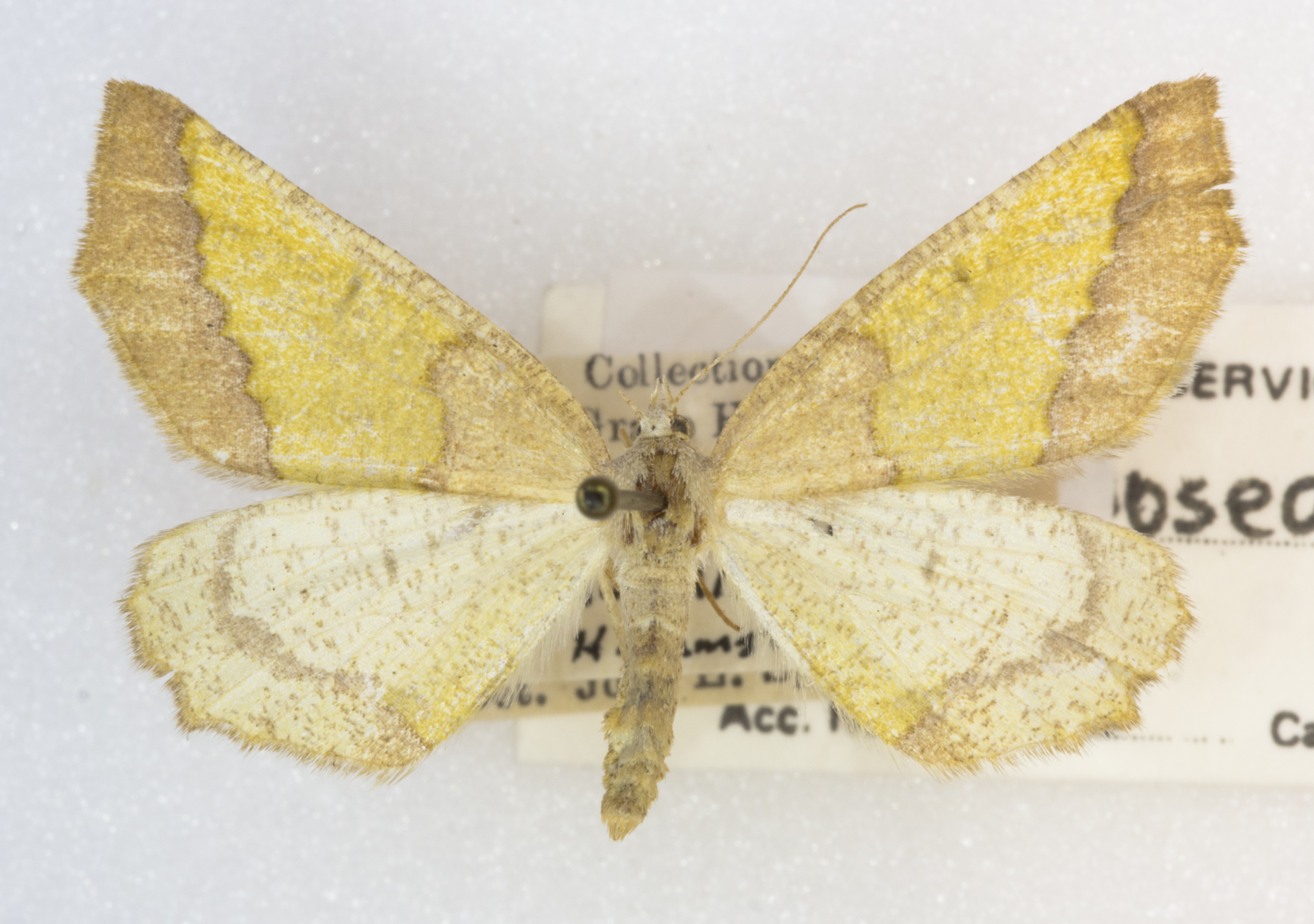

Scientific classification
- Domain: Eukaryota
- Kingdom: Animalia
- Phylum: Arthropoda
- Class: Insecta
- Order: Lepidoptera
- Family: Geometridae
- Tribe: Ourapterygini
- Genus: Lychnosea
- Species: L. helveolaria

Binomial name
- Lychnosea helveolaria (Hulst, 1881)

Synonyms
- Endropia helveolaria Hulst, 1881; Lychnosea aulularia Grote, 1883; Lychnosea runcinaria Strecker, 1899

= Lychnosea helveolaria =

Species of moth

Lychnosea helveolaria is a species of geometrid moth in the family Geometridae. It is found in North America.

The MONA or Hodges number for Lychnosea helveolaria is 6857.
