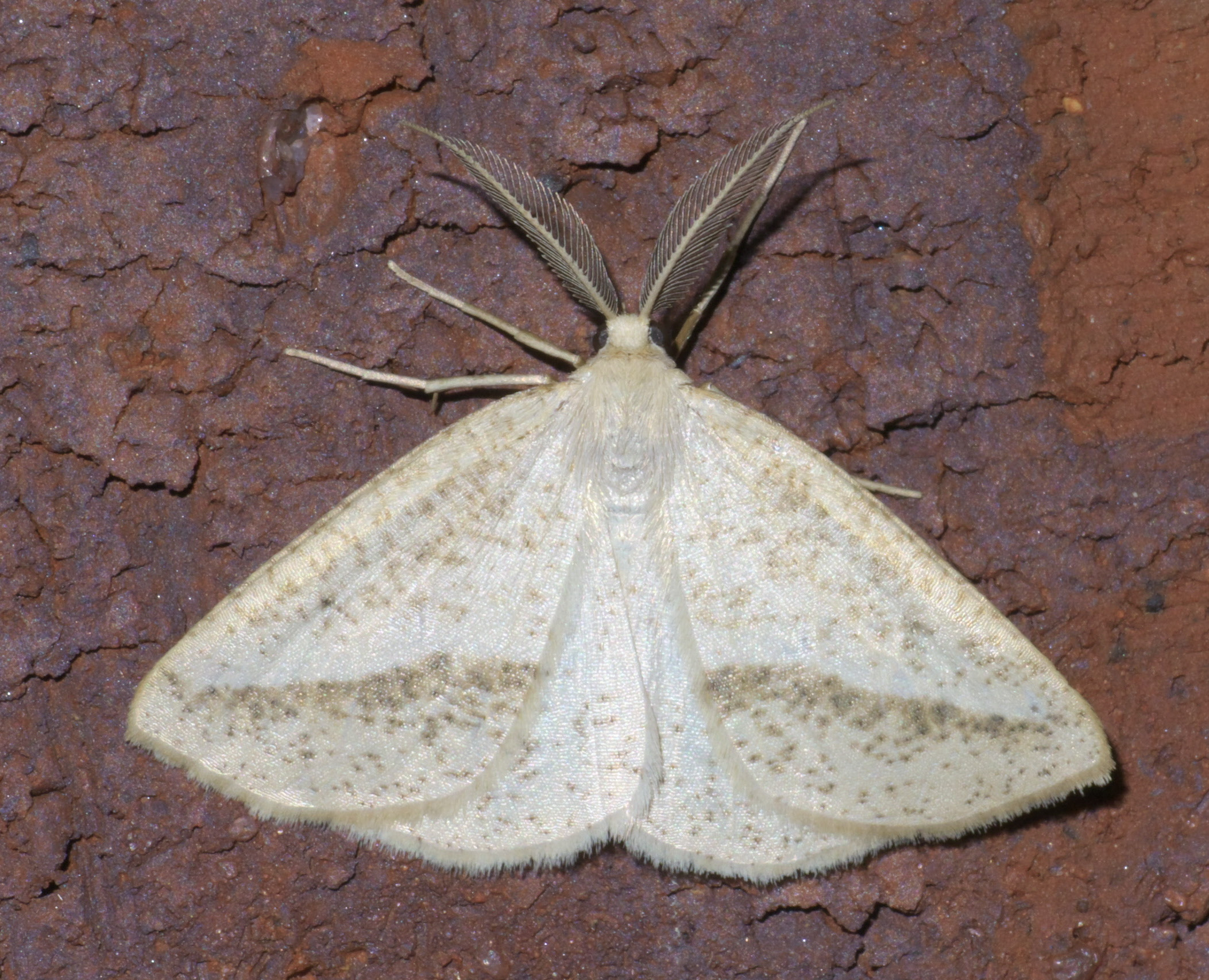

Scientific classification
- Kingdom: Animalia
- Phylum: Arthropoda
- Clade: Pancrustacea
- Class: Insecta
- Order: Lepidoptera
- Family: Geometridae
- Genus: Lychnosea
- Species: L. intermicata

Binomial name
- Lychnosea intermicata (Walker, 1862)

Synonyms
- Aspilates intermicata Walker, 1862; Aspilates pervaria Packard, 1873; Aspilates pervaria interminaria Grote, 1877

= Lychnosea intermicata =

Species of moth

Lychnosea intermicata (often misspelled as Ychnosea intermicata), the Speckled Lamplighter, is a species of geometrid moth in the family Geometridae. It is found in North America.

The MONA or Hodges number for Lychnosea intermicata is 6858.

== Similar species ==
- Yellow Slant-line Moth (Tetracis crocallata)
- Confused Eusarca Moth (Eusarca confusaria)

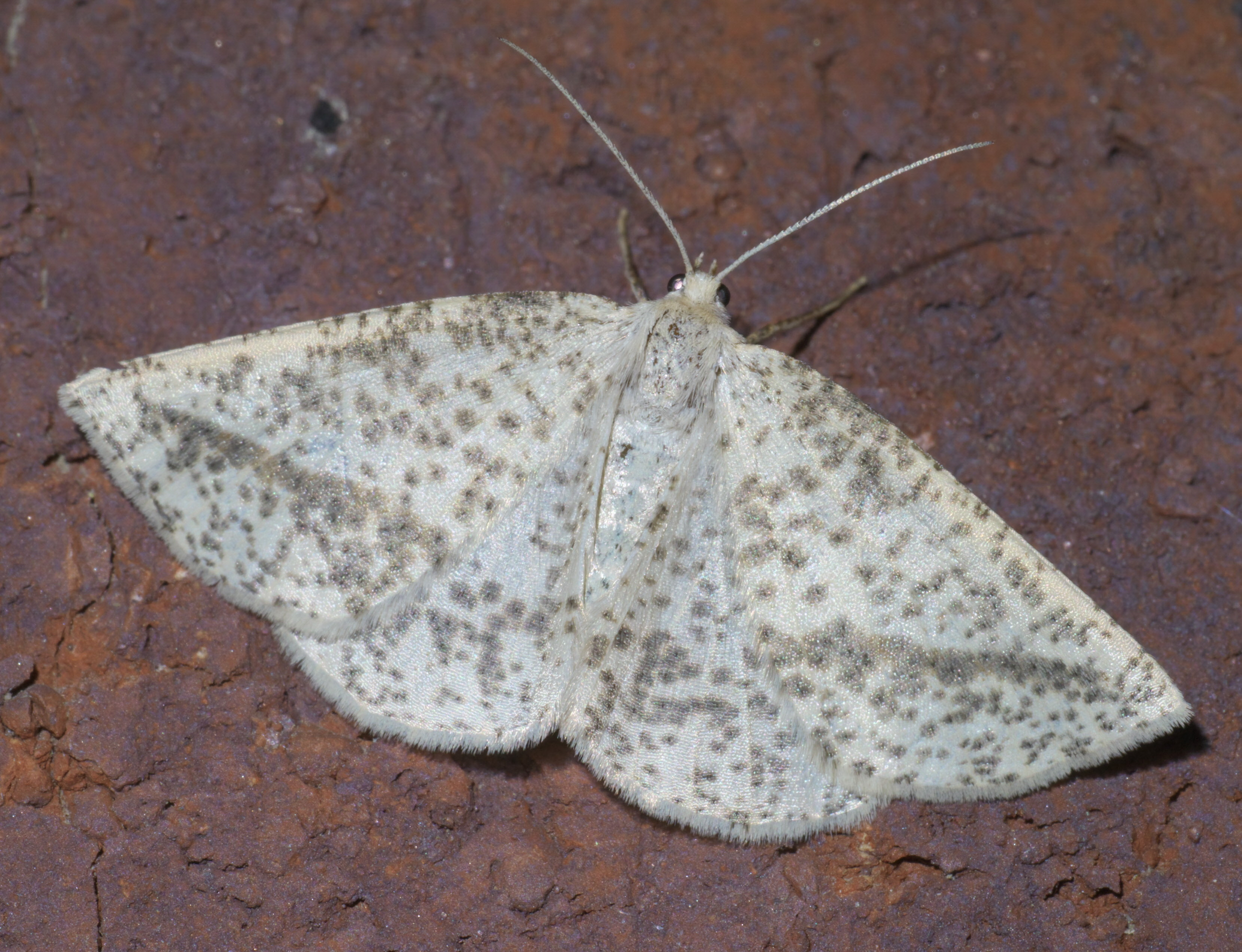
