= Tetracis hirsutaria =

Scientific classification
- Kingdom: Animalia
- Phylum: Arthropoda
- Clade: Pancrustacea
- Class: Insecta
- Order: Lepidoptera
- Family: Geometridae
- Genus: Tetracis
- Species: T. hirsutaria

Binomial name
- Tetracis hirsutaria ( Barnes & McDunnough, 1913)

Synonyms
- Metanema hirsutaria Barnes & McDunnough, 1913; Synaxis hirsutaria McDunnough, 1938

Species of moth

Tetracis hirsutaria is a moth of the family Geometridae, It is found predominately in the state of California and adults fly in the autumn. Like other 'Thorns', it has a prominent point in the middle of each wing's margin.

== Taxonomy ==
The species was first described by William Barnes and James Halliday McDunnough in 1913 under the named Metanema hirsutaria. It was moved to the genus Synaxis in 1938 and then to genus Tetracis in 2010.

== Distribution ==
Its current range is predominately in California and southern Nevada at elevations around 68–5100’ (21–1555m). Unconfirmed sightings have also been recorded for Alberta, British Columbia, California, New Mexico, Nevada, Oregon, Utah, Washington and Baja California, Mexico.

Confirmed observations have been made in the Californian counties of: Contra Costa, Kern, Lake, Los Angeles, Mono, Monterey, Napa, Nevada, Orange, Placer, Plumas, Riverside, San Bernardino, San Diego, Santa Barbara, Santa Clara, Shasta, Solano, Sonoma, Stanislaus, Tulare, Ventura, Modoc. And in Clark Co. Nevada.

== Description ==
This species is difficult to identify in the field and records of this moth may be misidentified, especially with other Tetracis species and Prochoerodes truxaliata. Tetracis hirsutaria is sexually dimorphic. Males are often tan with an orange tint and a well-defined orangish-brown lines. While females are usually gray to gray-brown with a speckled aspect and strongly falcate wingtips.

=== General description ===
The distinguishing feature of this moth is small dots where transverse lines cross the veins (magnification may be necessary).
- Antennae are bipectinate in males and filiform in females.
- Color is very variable, from yellow-brown, tan, gray, chocolate or white.
- Often heavily speckled, but maculation vary variable.
- Forewing wingtips are strongly falcate, more so in females.
- Wings have a prominent mid wing point.
- The antimedial line is convex, often faint.
- The postmedial line is thin, sinuate and variable, usualy with pale distal shading.
- Hindwings are paler with an incomplete median line.

=== Halotype description ===
Ferris and Schmidt give an anatomical description in "Revision of the North American Genera Tetracis...

"FWL: 17–23 mm. Antenna nearly white dorsally, bipectinate in male, nearly filiform in female and densely setose ventrally. Palpi medium width about 2x eye width, tan to brown, porrect, tips slightly decurved. Head, thorax,, abdomen, legs concolorous with base color of wings. Thorax dorsally and ventrally hirsute [the basis for the name, but no more so than in barnesii and formosa]. Wings: Base color variable in males, gray, pale ochreous, orange-ochreous, cinnamon, to chocolate brown; females gray or grayish-brown, irrorated with brown scales D and V. FW apex falcate, more so in females than males. DFW: AM line convex; PM line thin, sinuate, and only slightly bent basad at M3. PM line may appear brown with pale thin border distad, or pale with thin dark border line basad. Brown spots appear where the AM and PM lines cross the veins (magnification may be required to see these spots). Small brown discal spot present. DHW slightly paler than DFW with incomplete median line; brown discal spot small to obsolete. Wings much paler ventrally with dorsal maculation repeated lightly, or obsolete; wings lightly irrorated with brown scales." The publication also describes characteristics of the species' reproductive organs.

== Biology ==
The full life cycle of this moth is Unknown. "The timing of the adult flight in late August into September varies annually depending upon climatic conditions and flight ceases with the onset of the first hard mountain frost."(Ferris)

- Ferris & Schmidt reports early October to November flight.
- Moth Photographers Group reports May to July and September to November.

=== Host Plants ===
Larvae have been reared on Ceanothus (including Ceanothus cuneatus); Cercocarpus, (including Cercocarpus betuloides); Prunus emarginata and Ribes malvaceum.

== Similar Species ==
- Tetracis barnesii (Does not have the dark dots along AM and PM lines at the veins.)
- Prochoerodes truxaliata
- Sabulodes aegrotata

== External links and images ==
- Bug Guide
- iNaturalist
- Ecdysis arthropod collections
- Moth Photography Group
- Revision of the North American genera Tetracis Guenée and synonymization of Synaxis Hulst with descriptions of three new species (Lepidoptera: Geometridae: Ennominae)
