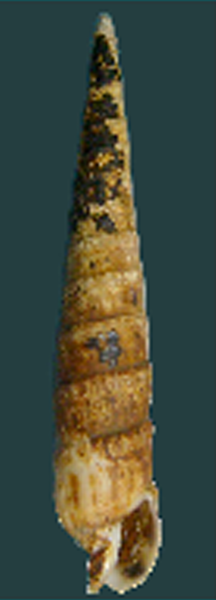
- Shell of Terebra cf. formosa

Scientific classification
- Kingdom: Animalia
- Phylum: Mollusca
- Class: Gastropoda
- Subclass: Caenogastropoda
- Order: Neogastropoda
- Family: Terebridae
- Genus: Terebra
- Species: T. formosa

Binomial name
- Terebra formosa Deshayes, 1857

Synonyms
- Terebra formosa Deshayes, 1958; Terebra incomparabilis Deshayes, 1859; Terebra pachyzoma Mörch, 1861

= Terebra formosa =

Species of sea snail

Terebra formosa is a species of sea snail, a marine gastropod mollusc in the family Terebridae, the auger snails.
