= Tetracis mosesiani =

Scientific classification
- Domain: Eukaryota
- Kingdom: Animalia
- Phylum: Arthropoda
- Class: Insecta
- Order: Lepidoptera
- Family: Geometridae
- Genus: Tetracis
- Species: T. mosesiani

Binomial name
- Tetracis mosesiani (Sala, [1971])

Synonyms
- Synaxis mosesiani Sala, [1971]

Species of moth

Tetracis mosesiani is a moth of the family Geometridae. It is found coastal California from near sea level to 915 meters.

The length of the forewings 17–23 mm. Adults are on wing from October to early December.

Larvae feed on Lonicera hispidula.
