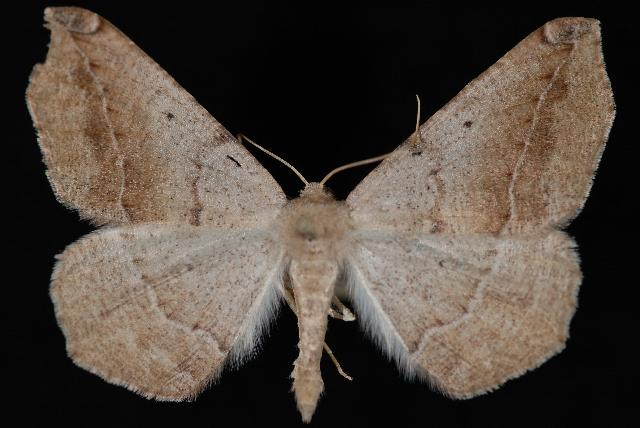

Scientific classification
- Kingdom: Animalia
- Phylum: Arthropoda
- Class: Insecta
- Order: Lepidoptera
- Family: Geometridae
- Tribe: Ourapterygini
- Genus: Prochoerodes
- Species: P. forficaria

Binomial name
- Prochoerodes forficaria (Guenée in Boisduval & Guenée, 1858)

= Prochoerodes forficaria =

Species of moth

Prochoerodes forficaria is a species of geometrid moth in the family Geometridae. It is found in North America.

The MONA or Hodges number for Prochoerodes forficaria is 6981.
