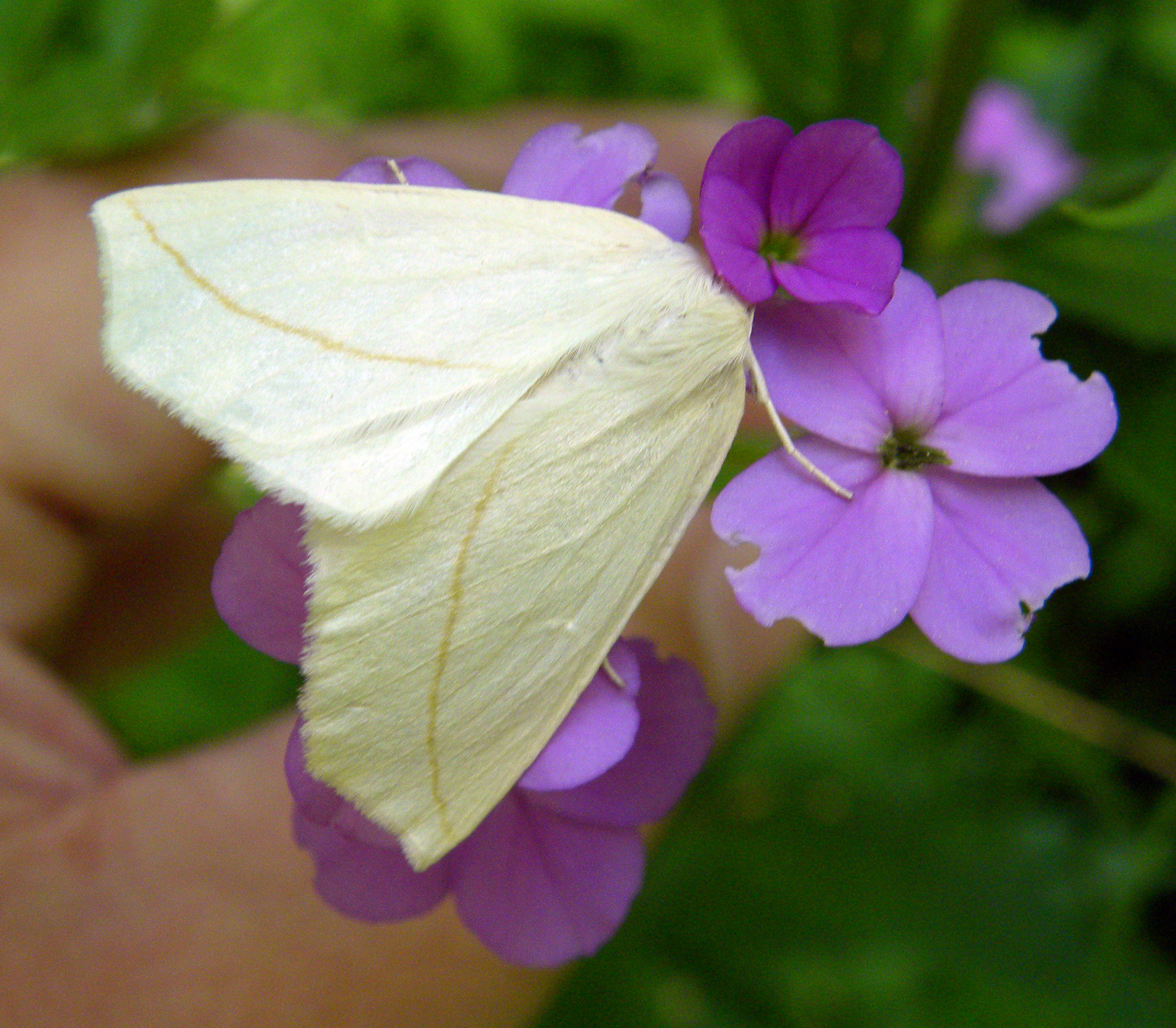
- White slant-line

Scientific classification
- Kingdom: Animalia
- Phylum: Arthropoda
- Clade: Pancrustacea
- Class: Insecta
- Order: Lepidoptera
- Family: Geometridae
- Subfamily: Ennominae
- Genus: Tetracis; Guenée, 1858

Synonyms
- Synaxis Hulst, 1896; Prionotetracis Warren, 1894

= Tetracis =

Genus of moths

Tetracis is a genus of moths in the family Geometridae erected by Achille Guenée in 1858.

== Species ==
- Tetracis australis Ferris, 2009
- Tetracis barnesii (Hulst, 1896)
- Tetracis cachexiata Guenée, [1858] – White slant-line
- Tetracis cervinaria (Packard, 1871) -Elegant Thorn
- Tetracis crocallata Guenée, [1858] - Yellow slant-line
- Tetracis formosa (Hulst, 1896)
- Tetracis fuscata (Hulst, 1898)
- Tetracis hirsutaria (Barnes & McDunnough, 1913)
- Tetracis jubararia Hulst, 1886 - October Thorn
- Tetracis montanaria Ferris, 2009
- Tetracis mosesiani (Sala, [1971])
- Tetracis pallidata Ferris, 2009
- Tetracis pallulata (Hulst, 1887)
