= Tetracis formosa =

Scientific classification
- Domain: Eukaryota
- Kingdom: Animalia
- Phylum: Arthropoda
- Class: Insecta
- Order: Lepidoptera
- Family: Geometridae
- Genus: Tetracis
- Species: T. formosa

Binomial name
- Tetracis formosa (Hulst, 1896)

Synonyms
- Gonodontis formosa Hulst, 1896; Synaxis formosa McDunnough, 1938

Species of moth

Tetracis formosa is a moth of the family Geometridae first described by George Duryea Hulst in 1896. It is found in North America from Colorado, eastern Utah and eastern Wyoming west to California and north to southern British Columbia and southern Alberta at elevations between 870 and 2,320 meters.

The length of the forewings 17–23 mm. Adults are on wing from early September to late November.

Larvae have been reared on Prunus andersonii.
