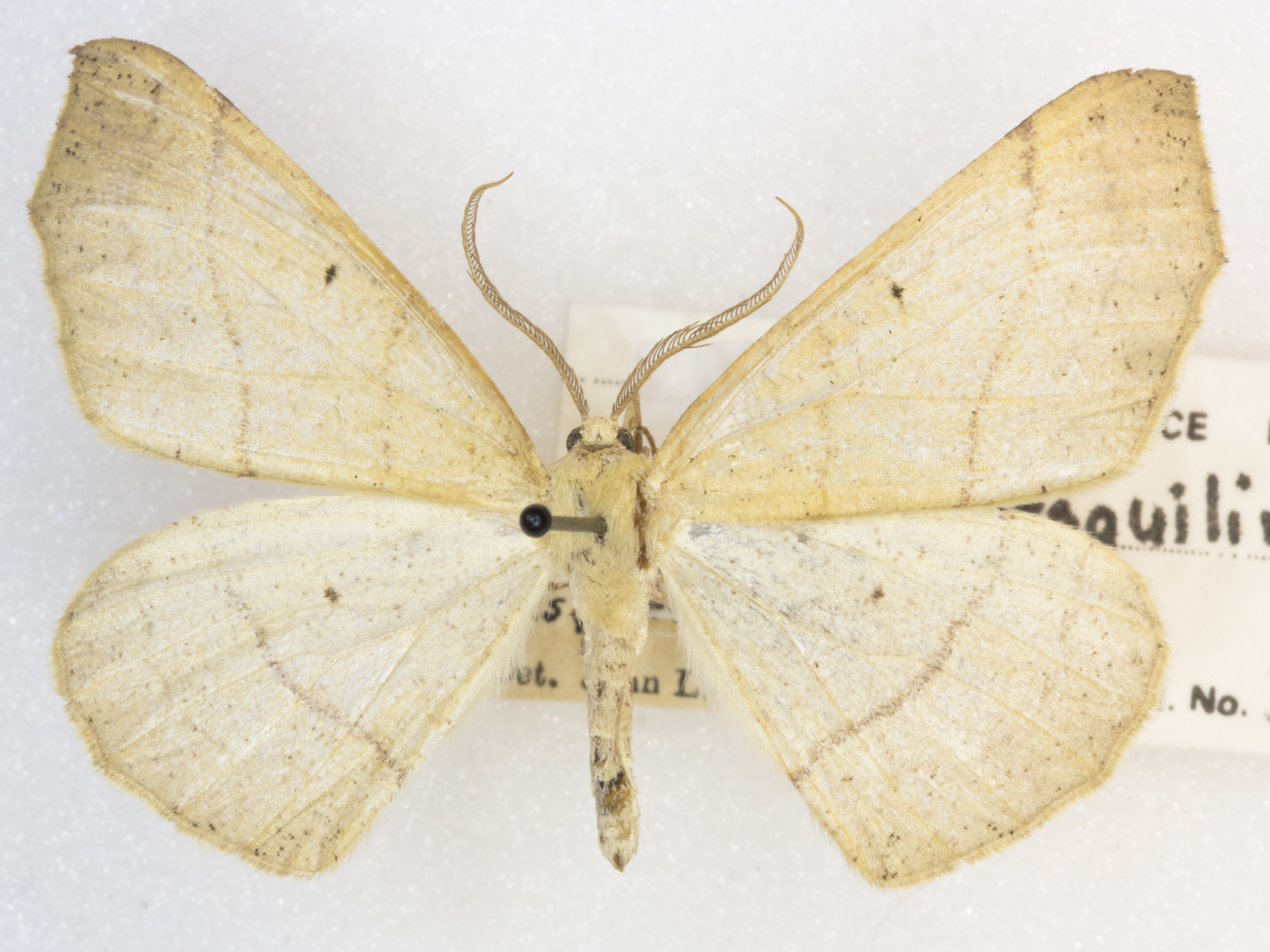

Scientific classification
- Kingdom: Animalia
- Phylum: Arthropoda
- Class: Insecta
- Order: Lepidoptera
- Family: Geometridae
- Genus: Besma
- Species: B. sesquilinearia

Binomial name
- Besma sesquilinearia (Grote, 1883)

Synonyms
- Tetracis cavillaria Hulst, 1886

= Besma sesquilinearia =

Species of moth

Besma sesquilinearia is a species of geometrid moth in the family Geometridae. It is found in North America.

The MONA or Hodges number for Besma sesquilinearia is 6887.
