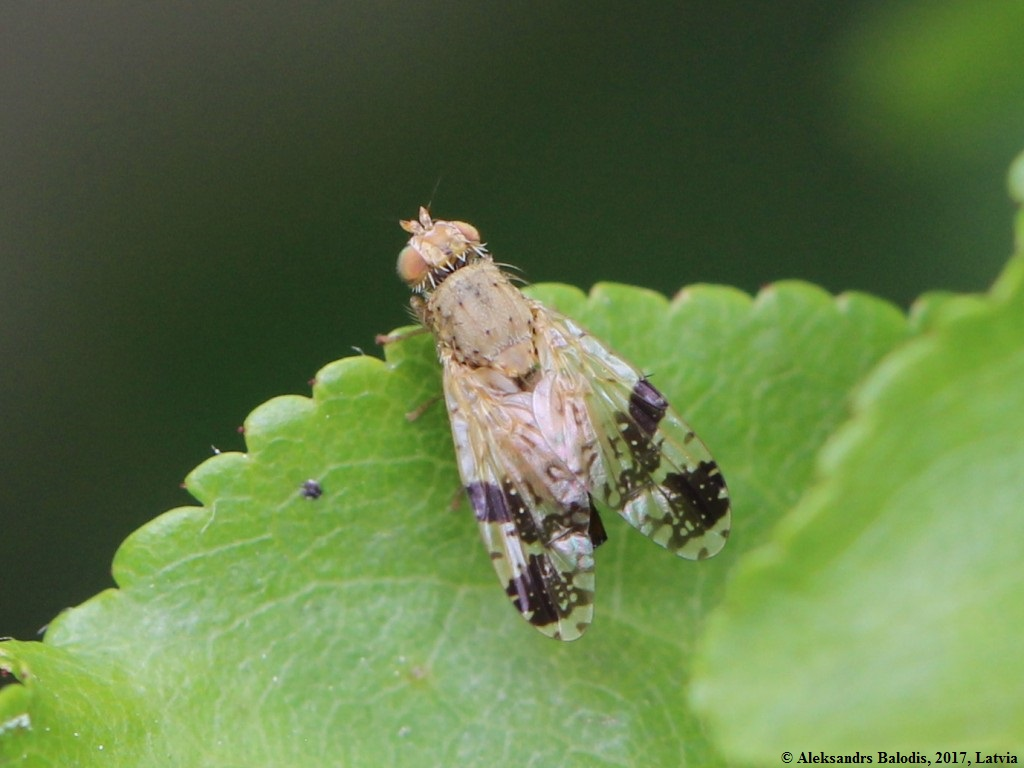
- Tephritis formosa. Dorsal view
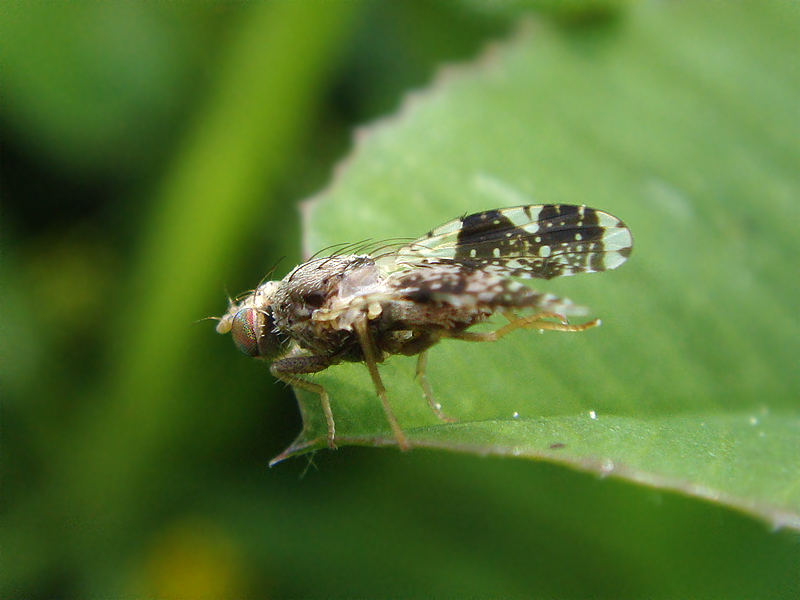
- Side view

Scientific classification
- Kingdom: Animalia
- Phylum: Arthropoda
- Clade: Pancrustacea
- Class: Insecta
- Order: Diptera
- Family: Tephritidae
- Subfamily: Tephritinae
- Tribe: Tephritini
- Genus: Tephritis
- Species: T. formosa

Binomial name
- Tephritis formosa (Loew, 1844)
- Range of Tephritis formosa in Europe

Synonyms
- Trypeta formosa Loew, 1844

= Tephritis formosa =

Species of fly

Tephritis formosa is a species of tephritid fly. It is one of many species known commonly as gall fly.

== Distribution ==
This species is found in most countries across Europe (Albania, Andorra, Austria, Balearic Islands, Belgium, United Kingdom, Ireland, Bulgaria, Czech Republic, France, Germany, Greece, Hungary, Italy, Malta, Republic of Moldova, Poland, Portugal, Romania, Slovakia, Spain, Switzerland, The Netherlands and Ukraine) and it also occurs in the Near East (Turkey, Caucasus, Israel and Iran).

== Habitat ==
These flies inhabit a wide range of habitats, but mainly prefer meadows, grassland and urban gardens where the host plants grow.

== Description ==
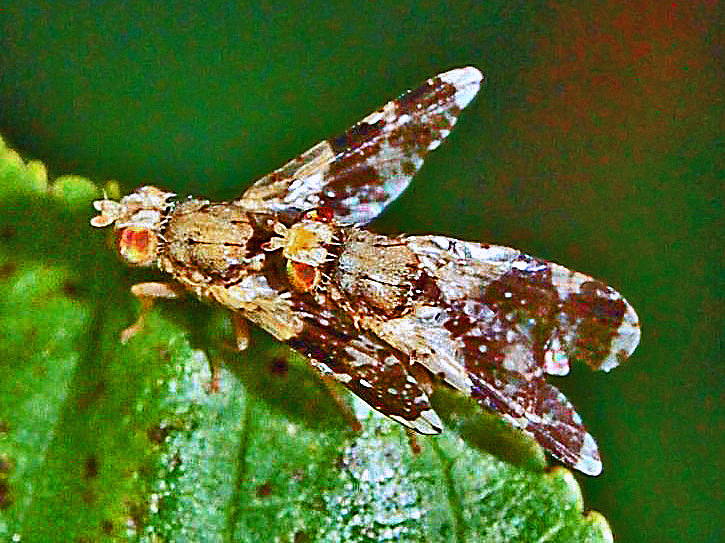
Mating pair

The adult male of Tephritis formosa is 4 to 5 mm long with wings about 4 mm long. The females are about 5 to 6 mm in length with wings of about 4 to 5 mm. The thorax and the abdomen are brownish. The head shows yellow-reddish eyes. The abdomen of the females ends in a tapered ovipositor, while it is rather rounded in males. The legs are yellowish. These small flies have light beige wings with large dark brown markings and small hyaline areas. The apical fork is missing. There are only some brown spots at end of veins R4+5 and M.

== Biology ==
The host plants for the larvae are hawksbeards (Crepis virens), cat's ear (Hypochaeris radicata) and sow-thistle (Sonchus olearius, Sonchus aspera, Sonchus arvensis).

Larvae invade the flower heads, causing galls to form.
