= Turbonilla bushiana =

Scientific classification
- Kingdom: Animalia
- Phylum: Mollusca
- Class: Gastropoda
- Family: Pyramidellidae
- Genus: Turbonilla
- Species: T. bushiana

Binomial name
- Turbonilla bushiana A. E. Verrill, 1882

Synonyms
- Odostomia bushiana (A. E. Verrill, 1882); Turbonilla abyssicola Bartsch, 1909; Turbonilla formosa Verrill & Smith, 1880; Turbonilla inornata Bush, 1909

Species of gastropod

Turbonilla bushiana is a species of sea snail, a marine gastropod mollusk in the family Pyramidellidae, the pyrams and their allies.

== Description ==
The shell grows to a length of 13.5 mm.

== Distribution ==
This marine species occurs in the following locations at depths between 668 m and 2811 m:

- Cobscook Bay
- Gulf of Maine
- Northwest Atlantic
- European waters (ERMS scope)
- United Kingdom Exclusive Economic Zone

== Notes ==
Additional information regarding this species:

- Diet: generally for group, planktonic and minute detrital food items through either suspension or deposit feeding
- Dimensions: maximum size of 11 mm
- Distribution: Georges Bank to Long Island, New York
- Reproduction: sexes are separate but are seldom conspicuously different externally; simultaneous hermaphrodites yet self-fertilization is prevented due to various morphological, physiological, or behavioral mechanisms; generally, marine gastropods shed their eggs
