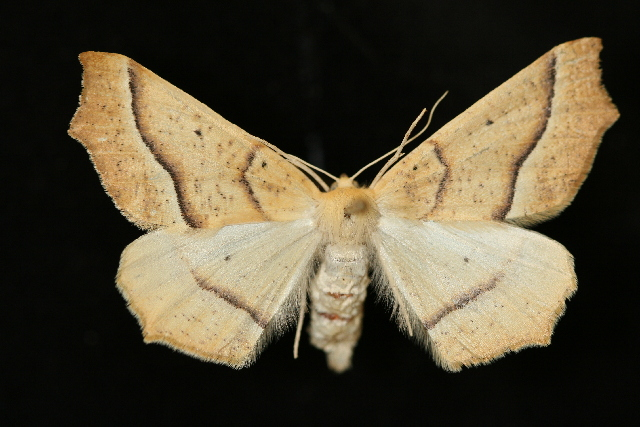

Scientific classification
- Domain: Eukaryota
- Kingdom: Animalia
- Phylum: Arthropoda
- Class: Insecta
- Order: Lepidoptera
- Family: Geometridae
- Genus: Tetracis
- Species: T. pallulata

Binomial name
- Tetracis pallulata (Hulst, 1887)

Synonyms
- Synaxis pallulata Hulst, 1896

= Tetracis pallulata =

Species of moth

Tetracis pallulata is a moth of the family Geometridae first described by George Duryea Hulst in 1887. It is found in western North America from southern California north to British Columbia, east to Idaho (Clearwater County) and western Montana (Lewis and Clark County) from near sea level to 2,200 meters.

The length of the forewings 18–24 mm. Adults are on wing from August to October.

Larvae have been recorded on Abies concolor, Picea engelmannii, Picea sitchensis, Abies grandis, Pseudotsuga menziesii and Tsuga species (including Tsuga heterophylla and Tsuga canadensis).
