= Pherne parallelia =

Scientific classification
- Kingdom: Animalia
- Phylum: Arthropoda
- Clade: Pancrustacea
- Class: Insecta
- Order: Lepidoptera
- Family: Geometridae
- Genus: Pherne
- Species: P. parallelia

Binomial name
- Pherne parallelia (Packard, 1873)

Species of moth

Pherne parallelia is a species of geometrid moth in the family Geometridae. It is found in North America.

The MONA or Hodges number for Pherne parallelia is 6950.
