= Tetracis pallidata =

Scientific classification
- Domain: Eukaryota
- Kingdom: Animalia
- Phylum: Arthropoda
- Class: Insecta
- Order: Lepidoptera
- Family: Geometridae
- Genus: Tetracis
- Species: T. pallidata

Binomial name
- Tetracis pallidata Ferris, 2009

Species of moth

Tetracis pallidata is a moth of the family Geometridae first described by Clifford D. Ferris in 2009. It is found in British Columbia, Idaho and Washington.

The length of the forewings 20–23 mm. Adults are on wing from mid-September into early October.

Larvae have been reared on Ribes species.
