= Pherne placeraria =

Scientific classification
- Kingdom: Animalia
- Phylum: Arthropoda
- Class: Insecta
- Order: Lepidoptera
- Family: Geometridae
- Tribe: Ourapterygini
- Genus: Pherne
- Species: P. placeraria

Binomial name
- Pherne placeraria (Guenée in Boisduval & Guenée, 1858)

Species of moth

Pherne placeraria is a species of geometrid moth in the family Geometridae. It is found in North America.

The MONA or Hodges number for Pherne placeraria is 6949.
