= Destutia oblentaria =

Scientific classification
- Domain: Eukaryota
- Kingdom: Animalia
- Phylum: Arthropoda
- Class: Insecta
- Order: Lepidoptera
- Family: Geometridae
- Genus: Destutia
- Species: D. oblentaria

Binomial name
- Destutia oblentaria (Grote, 1883)

Synonyms
- Tetracis oblentaria Grote, 1883

Species of moth

Destutia oblentaria is a species of geometrid moth in the family Geometridae. It is found in North America.

The MONA or Hodges number for Destutia oblentaria is 6882.
