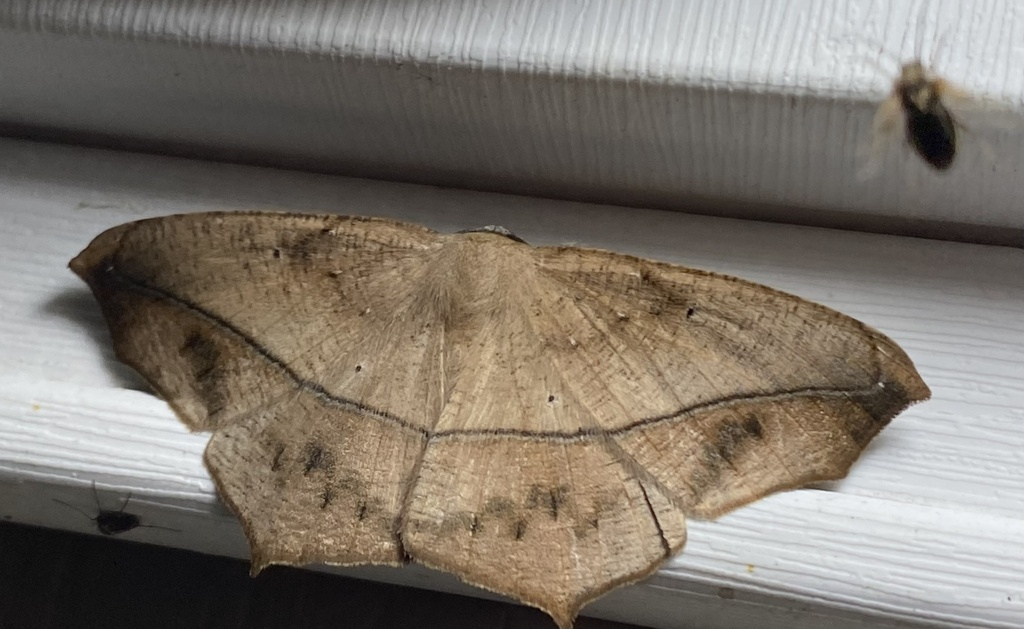

Scientific classification
- Domain: Eukaryota
- Kingdom: Animalia
- Phylum: Arthropoda
- Class: Insecta
- Order: Lepidoptera
- Family: Geometridae
- Genus: Prochoerodes
- Species: P. lineola

Binomial name
- Prochoerodes lineola (Goeze, 1781)

Synonyms
- Phalaena lineola Goeze, 1781; Prochoerodes transversata (Drury, 1770); Prochoerodes goniata (Guenée, 1857); Prochoerodes contingens (Walker, 1860); Prochoerodes transposita (Walker, 1860); Prochoerodes transfindens (Walker, 1860); Prochoerodes transvertens (Walker, 1860); Prochoerodes transmutans (Walker, 1860)

= Prochoerodes lineola =

Species of moth

Prochoerodes lineola, the large maple spanworm, is a moth of the family Geometridae. It is found from Nova Scotia to Florida, west to Texas and north to Alberta.

The wingspan is 35–50 mm. They are on wing from April to October in the south and from July to September in the north.

The larvae feed on the leaves of a wide range of plants, including apple, birch, blueberry, cherry, currant, geranium, grass, maple, oak, poplar, soybean, sweetfern, walnut and willow.

== Subspecies ==
- Prochoerodes lineola lineola
- Prochoerodes lineola incurvata (Guenée, 1857)
