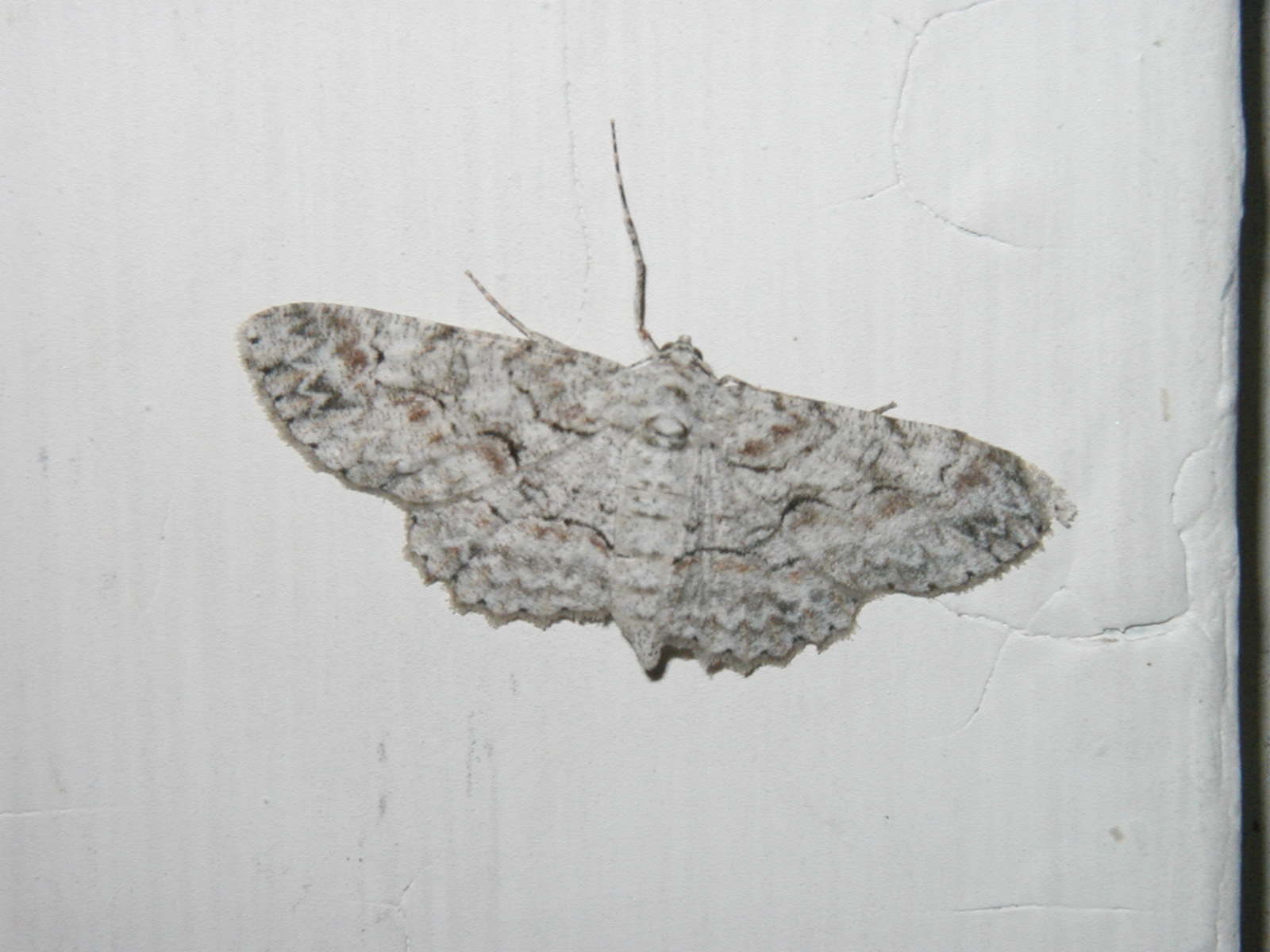
- Anacamptodes defectaria

Scientific classification
- Kingdom: Animalia
- Phylum: Arthropoda
- Clade: Pancrustacea
- Class: Insecta
- Order: Lepidoptera
- Family: Geometridae
- Tribe: Boarmiini
- Genus: Anacamptodes; McDunnough, 1920

= Anacamptodes =

Genus of geometer moths

Anacamptodes is a genus of moths in the family Geometridae erected by James Halliday McDunnough in 1920. There are around 40 species within the genus, although a number have been reassigned to the genus Iridopsis.

== Species ==
- Anacamptodes angulata Rindge, 1966
- Anacamptodes cerasta Rindge, 1966
- Anacamptodes clivinaria Guenée, 1858
- Anacamptodes cypressaria Grossbeck, 1917
- Anacamptodes dataria Grote, 1882
- Anacamptodes defectaria Guenée, 1857 (syn: Anacamptodes albigenaria Walker, 1860)
- Anacamptodes emida Schaus
- Anacamptodes encarsia Rindge, 1966
- Anacamptodes ephyraria Walker, 1860
- Anacamptodes expressaria Walker, 1862
- Anacamptodes fragilaria Grossbeck, 1909
- Anacamptodes fragillaria Barnes & McDunnough, 1912
- Anacamptodes gemella Rindge, 1966
- Anacamptodes herse Schaus, 1912
- Anacamptodes humaria Packard, 1876
- Anacamptodes illaudata Walker, 1860
- Anacamptodes illaudatum Dyar, 1902
- Anacamptodes impia Rindge, 1966
- Anacamptodes intractaria Walker, 1860
- Anacamptodes intraria Guenée, 1857
- Anacamptodes jacumbaria Dyar, 1908
- Anacamptodes larvaria Saunders, 1874
- Anacamptodes lurida Schaus, 1918
- Anacamptodes monticola Rindge, 1966
- Anacamptodes obliquaria Grote, 1883
- Anacamptodes pallida Rindge, 1966
- Anacamptodes perfectaria McDunnough, 1940
- Anacamptodes pergracilis Hulst, 1900
- Anacamptodes profanata Barnes & McDunnough, 1916
- Anacamptodes providentia Rindge, 1966
- Anacamptodes pseudoherse Rindge, 1966
- Anacamptodes rufaria Grote, 1883
- Anacamptodes sancta Rindge, 1966
- Anacamptodes sanctissima Barnes & McDunnough, 1916
- Anacamptodes takenaria Pearsall, 1909
- Anacamptodes tethe Rindge, 1966
- Anacamptodes triplicia Rindge, 1966
- Anacamptodes vellivolata Hulst, 1887

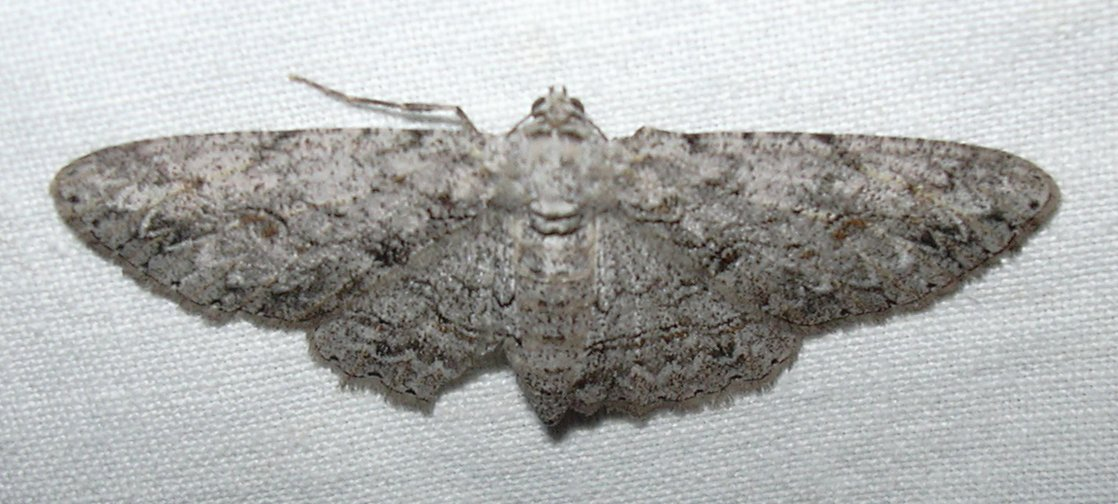
Anacamptodes fragilaria
