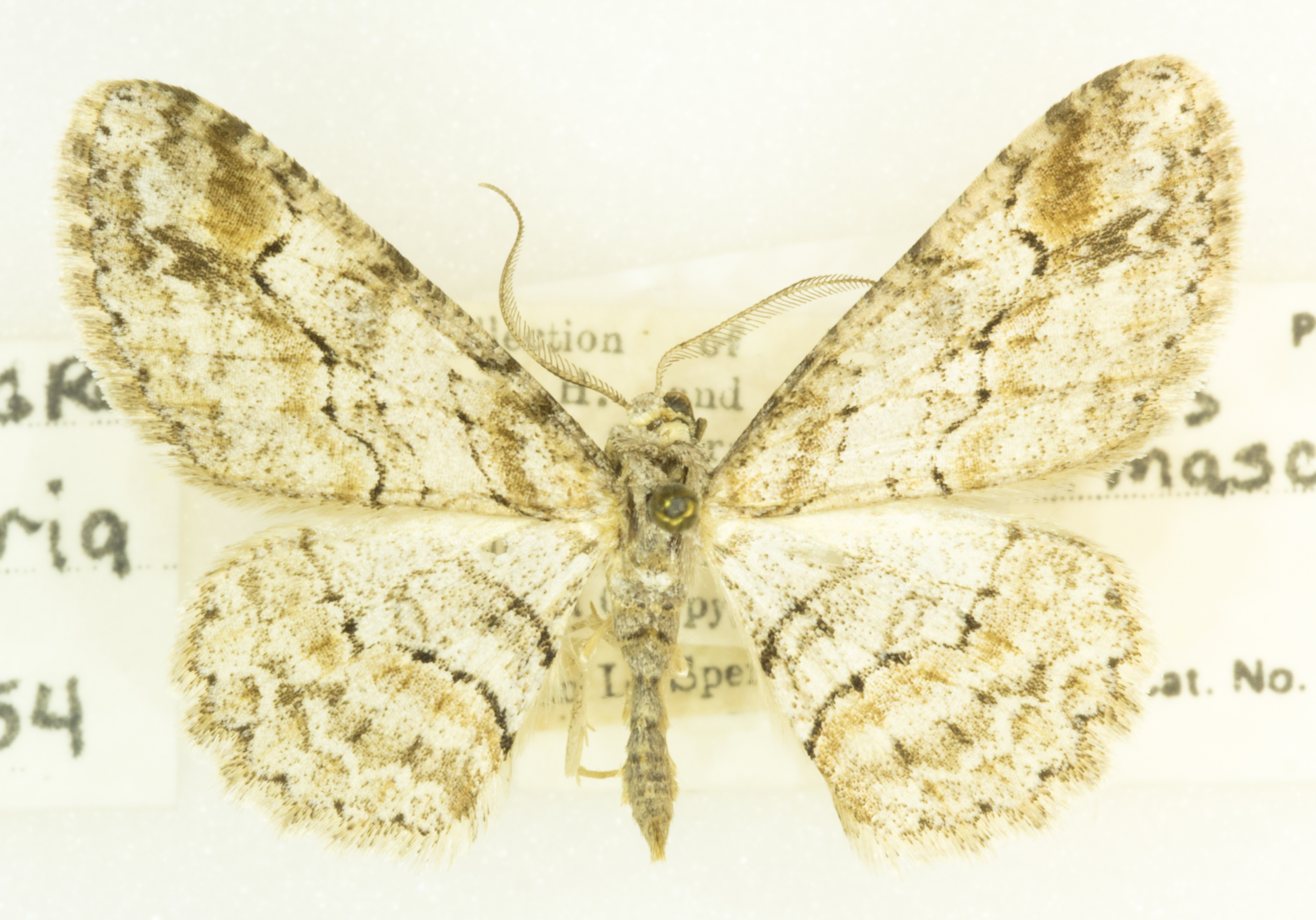
- Iridopsis emasculatum

Scientific classification
- Kingdom: Animalia
- Phylum: Arthropoda
- Class: Insecta
- Order: Lepidoptera
- Family: Geometridae
- Genus: Iridopsis
- Species: I. emasculatum

Binomial name
- Iridopsis emasculatum (Dyar, 1904)

= Iridopsis emasculatum =

Species of moth

Iridopsis emasculatum is a species of geometrid moth in the family Geometridae. It is found in North America.

The MONA or Hodges number for Iridopsis emasculatum is 6589.
