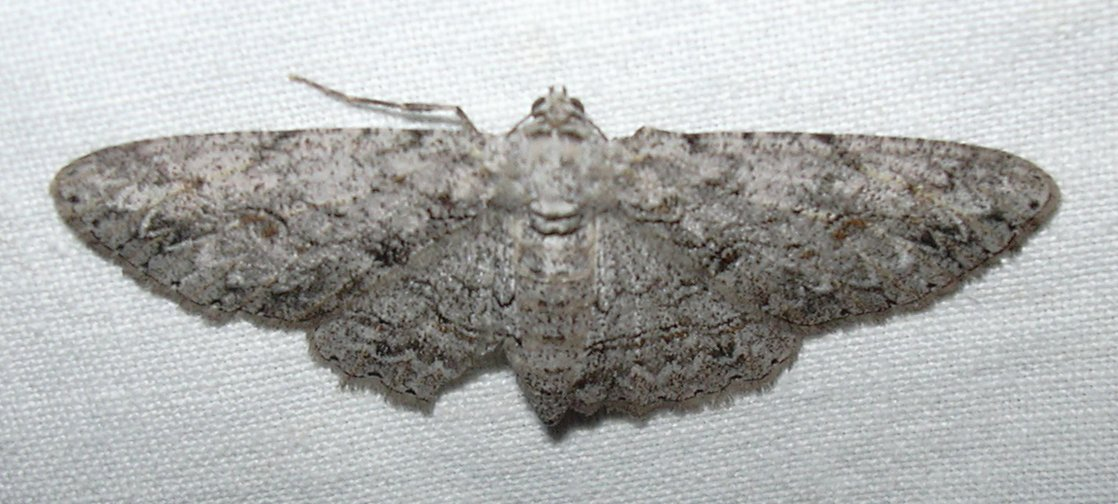

Scientific classification
- Domain: Eukaryota
- Kingdom: Animalia
- Phylum: Arthropoda
- Class: Insecta
- Order: Lepidoptera
- Family: Geometridae
- Subfamily: Ennominae
- Tribe: Boarmiini
- Genus: Anacamptodes
- Species: A. fragilaria

Binomial name
- Anacamptodes fragilaria Grossbeck, 1909

Synonyms
- Cleora fragilaria

= Anacamptodes fragilaria =

Species of moth

Anacamptodes fragilaria, the kiawe moth, koa haole looper or citrus looper, is a species of moth in the family Geometridae. The species was first described by John Arthur Grossbeck in 1909. It is found in the Hawaiian islands of Kauai, Niihau, Oahu, Molokai, Maui and Hawaii as well as California, where it is native.

There are five generations per year.

== Food ==
The larvae are a pest on citrus species. Recorded hosts are:

- Acacia farnesiana
- Amaranthus
- Antigonon leptopus
- Bauhinia monandra
- Calliandra haematomma
- Cassia grandis
- Cassia javanica × Cassia fistula
- Cordia subcordata
- Delonix regia
- Desmanthus virgatus
- Hibiscus
- Justicia betonica
- Leucaena glauca
- Litchi chinensis
- Macadamia ternifolia
- Malvastrum tricuspidatum
- Merremia tuberosa
- Momordica balsamina
- Nicotiana glauca
- Ocimum basilicum
- Passiflora foetida
- Pithecellobium dulce
- Portulaca oleracea
- Prosopis chilensis
- Psidium cattleianum
- Rosa
- Samanea saman
- Santalum album
- Schinus molle
- Schinus terebinthifolius
- Sida
- Spathodea campanulata
- Tectona grandis
- Terminalia catappa
