= Iridopsis jacumbaria =

Scientific classification
- Kingdom: Animalia
- Phylum: Arthropoda
- Class: Insecta
- Order: Lepidoptera
- Family: Geometridae
- Genus: Iridopsis
- Species: I. jacumbaria

Binomial name
- Iridopsis jacumbaria (Dyar, 1908)

Species of moth

Iridopsis jacumbaria is a species of geometrid moth in the family Geometridae.

The MONA or Hodges number for Iridopsis jacumbaria is 6572.
