= Iridopsis gemella =

Scientific classification
- Kingdom: Animalia
- Phylum: Arthropoda
- Clade: Pancrustacea
- Class: Insecta
- Order: Lepidoptera
- Family: Geometridae
- Tribe: Boarmiini
- Genus: Iridopsis
- Species: I. gemella

Binomial name
- Iridopsis gemella (Rindge, 1966)

Synonyms
- Anacamptodes gemella Rindge, 1966

Species of moth

Iridopsis gemella is a species of geometrid moth in the family Geometridae.

The MONA or Hodges number for Iridopsis gemella is 6587.
