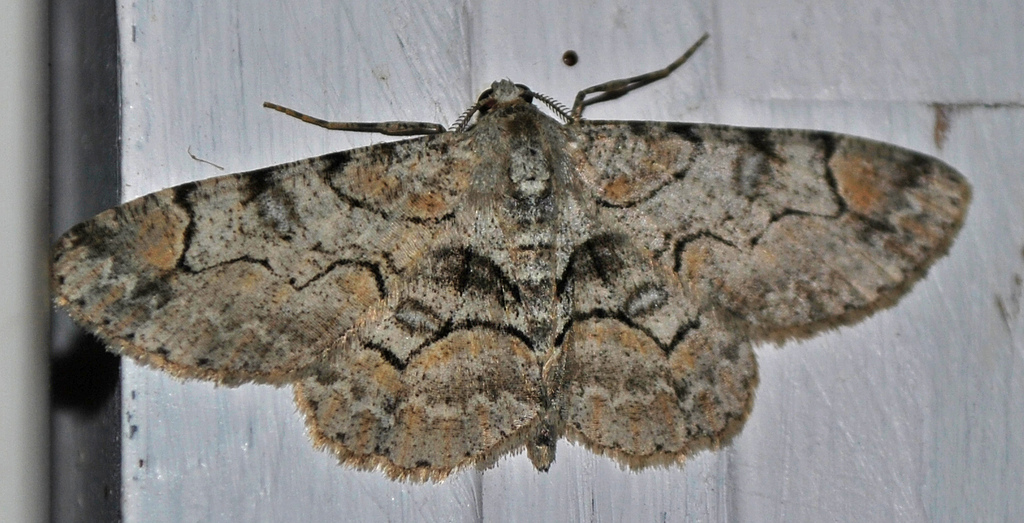

Scientific classification
- Kingdom: Animalia
- Phylum: Arthropoda
- Class: Insecta
- Order: Lepidoptera
- Family: Geometridae
- Genus: Iridopsis
- Species: I. larvaria

Binomial name
- Iridopsis larvaria (Guenée in Boisduval & Guenée, 1858)

= Iridopsis larvaria =

Species of moth

Iridopsis larvaria, the bent-line gray, is a species of geometrid moth in the family Geometridae.

== Distribution ==
It is found in North America.

The MONA or Hodges number for Iridopsis larvaria is 6588.
