= Iridopsis sancta =

Scientific classification
- Domain: Eukaryota
- Kingdom: Animalia
- Phylum: Arthropoda
- Class: Insecta
- Order: Lepidoptera
- Family: Geometridae
- Tribe: Boarmiini
- Genus: Iridopsis
- Species: I. sancta

Binomial name
- Iridopsis sancta (Rindge, 1966)

Synonyms
- Anacamptodes sancta Rindge, 1966

Species of moth

Iridopsis sancta is a species of geometrid moth in the family Geometridae.

The MONA or Hodges number for Iridopsis sancta is 6579.
