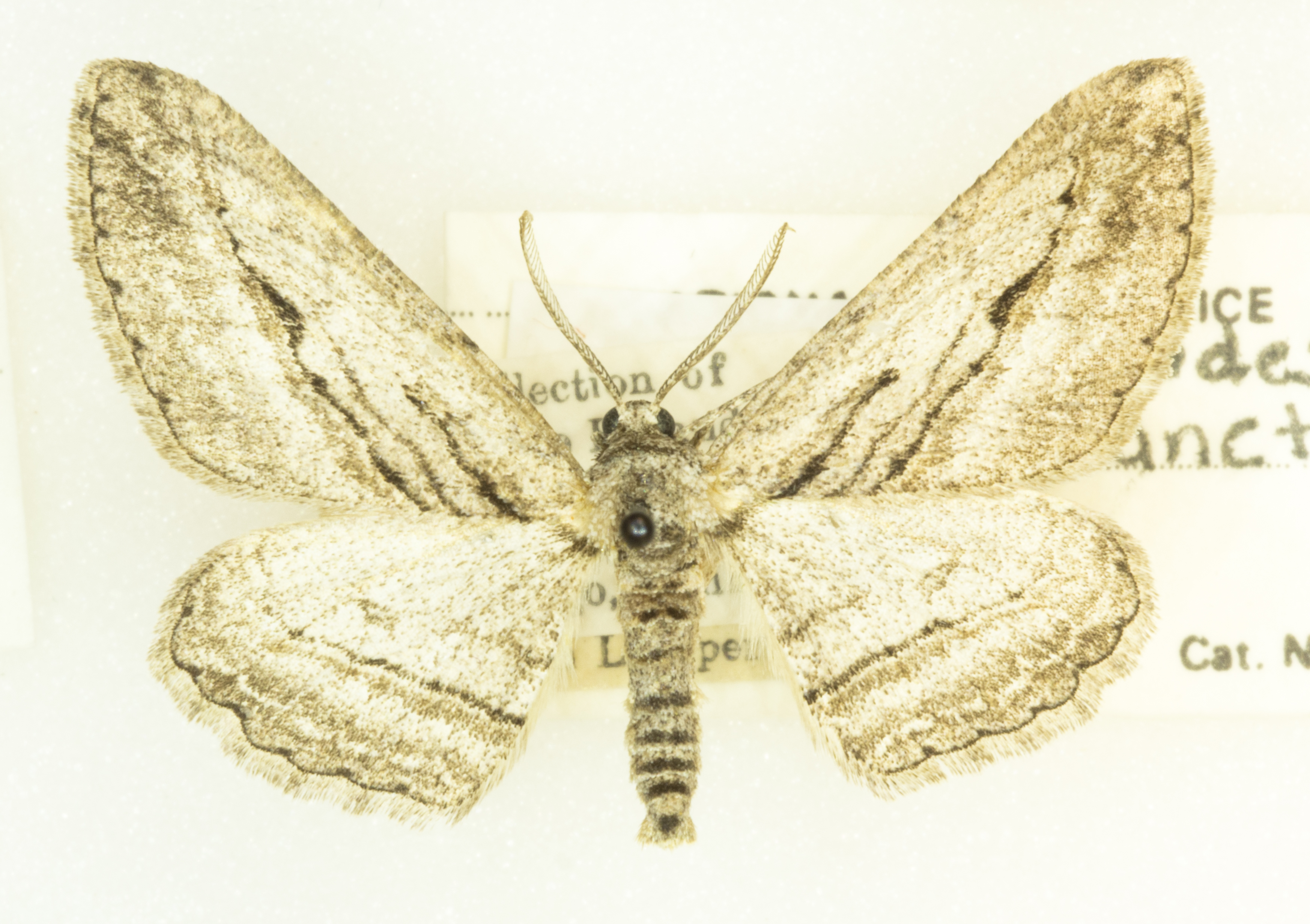
- Iridopsis sanctissima specimine

Scientific classification
- Domain: Eukaryota
- Kingdom: Animalia
- Phylum: Arthropoda
- Class: Insecta
- Order: Lepidoptera
- Family: Geometridae
- Genus: Iridopsis
- Species: I. sanctissima

Binomial name
- Iridopsis sanctissima (Barnes & McDunnough, 1917)

Synonyms
- Cleora sanctissima Barnes & McDunnough, 1917

= Iridopsis sanctissima =

Species of moth

Iridopsis sanctissima is a species of moth in the family Geometridae first described by William Barnes and James Halliday McDunnough in 1917. It is found in Central and North America, where has been recorded from Nevada, Arizona, California and northern Baja California.

The length of the forewings is 15–18 mm for males and 15–20 mm for females.

The MONA or Hodges number for Iridopsis sanctissima is 6576.
