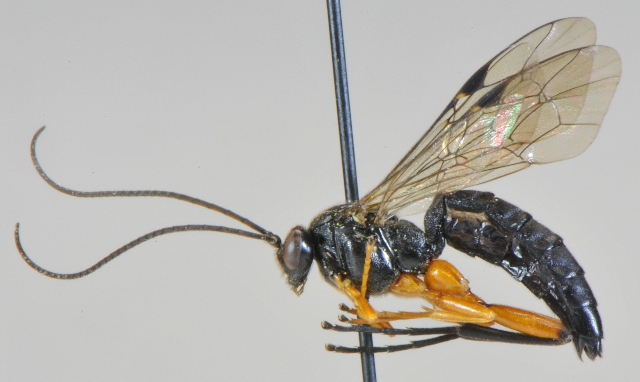

Scientific classification
- Domain: Eukaryota
- Kingdom: Animalia
- Phylum: Arthropoda
- Class: Insecta
- Order: Hymenoptera
- Family: Ichneumonidae
- Genus: Pimpla
- Species: P. pedalis

Binomial name
- Pimpla pedalis Cresson, 1865

= Pimpla pedalis =

Species of wasp

Pimpla pedalis is a species of ichneumon wasp in the family Ichneumonidae. The species is a pupal parasitoid of Iridopsis ephyraria.
