= Iridopsis cypressaria =

Scientific classification
- Kingdom: Animalia
- Phylum: Arthropoda
- Clade: Pancrustacea
- Class: Insecta
- Order: Lepidoptera
- Family: Geometridae
- Genus: Iridopsis
- Species: I. cypressaria

Binomial name
- Iridopsis cypressaria (Grossbeck, 1917)

Species of moth

Iridopsis cypressaria is a species of geometrid moth in the family Geometridae.
