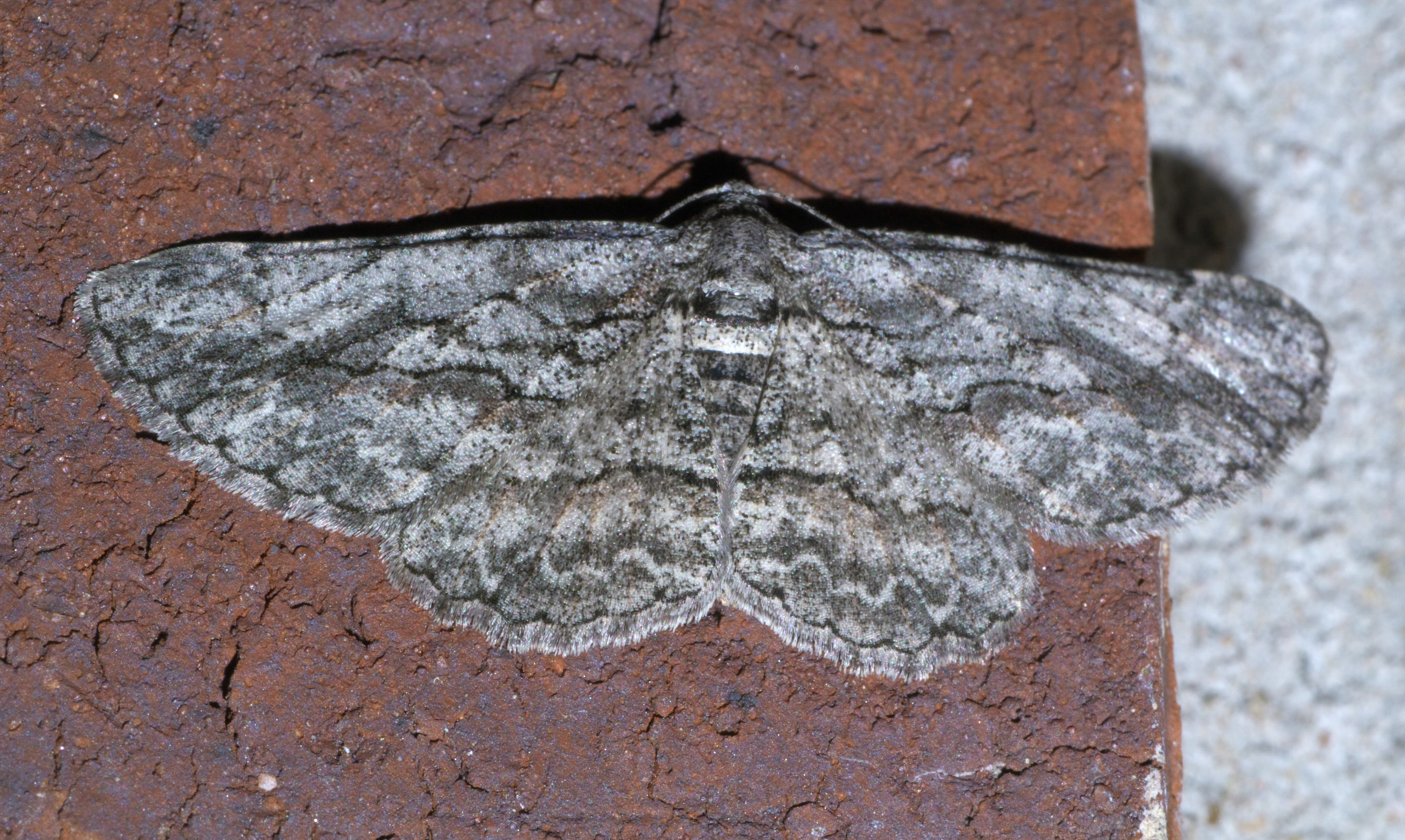

Scientific classification
- Kingdom: Animalia
- Phylum: Arthropoda
- Class: Insecta
- Order: Lepidoptera
- Family: Geometridae
- Tribe: Boarmiini
- Genus: Iridopsis
- Species: I. humaria

Binomial name
- Iridopsis humaria (Guenée in Boisduval & Guenée, 1858)

= Iridopsis humaria =

Species of moth

Iridopsis humaria, the small purplish gray, is a species of geometrid moth in the family Geometridae.

The MONA or Hodges number for Iridopsis humaria is 6584.
