= Iridopsis angulata =

Scientific classification
- Kingdom: Animalia
- Phylum: Arthropoda
- Clade: Pancrustacea
- Class: Insecta
- Order: Lepidoptera
- Family: Geometridae
- Genus: Iridopsis
- Species: I. angulata

Binomial name
- Iridopsis angulata (Rindge, 1966)

Synonyms
- Anacamptodes angulata

Species of moth

Iridopsis angulata is a moth of the family Geometridae. The larvae feed on the leaves of Asteraceae.
