= Iridopsis perfectaria =

Scientific classification
- Kingdom: Animalia
- Phylum: Arthropoda
- Clade: Pancrustacea
- Class: Insecta
- Order: Lepidoptera
- Family: Geometridae
- Tribe: Boarmiini
- Genus: Iridopsis
- Species: I. perfectaria

Binomial name
- Iridopsis perfectaria (McDunnough, 1940)

Synonyms
- Anacamptodes perfectaria McDunnough, 1940

Species of moth

Iridopsis perfectaria is a species of geometrid moth in the family Geometridae.
