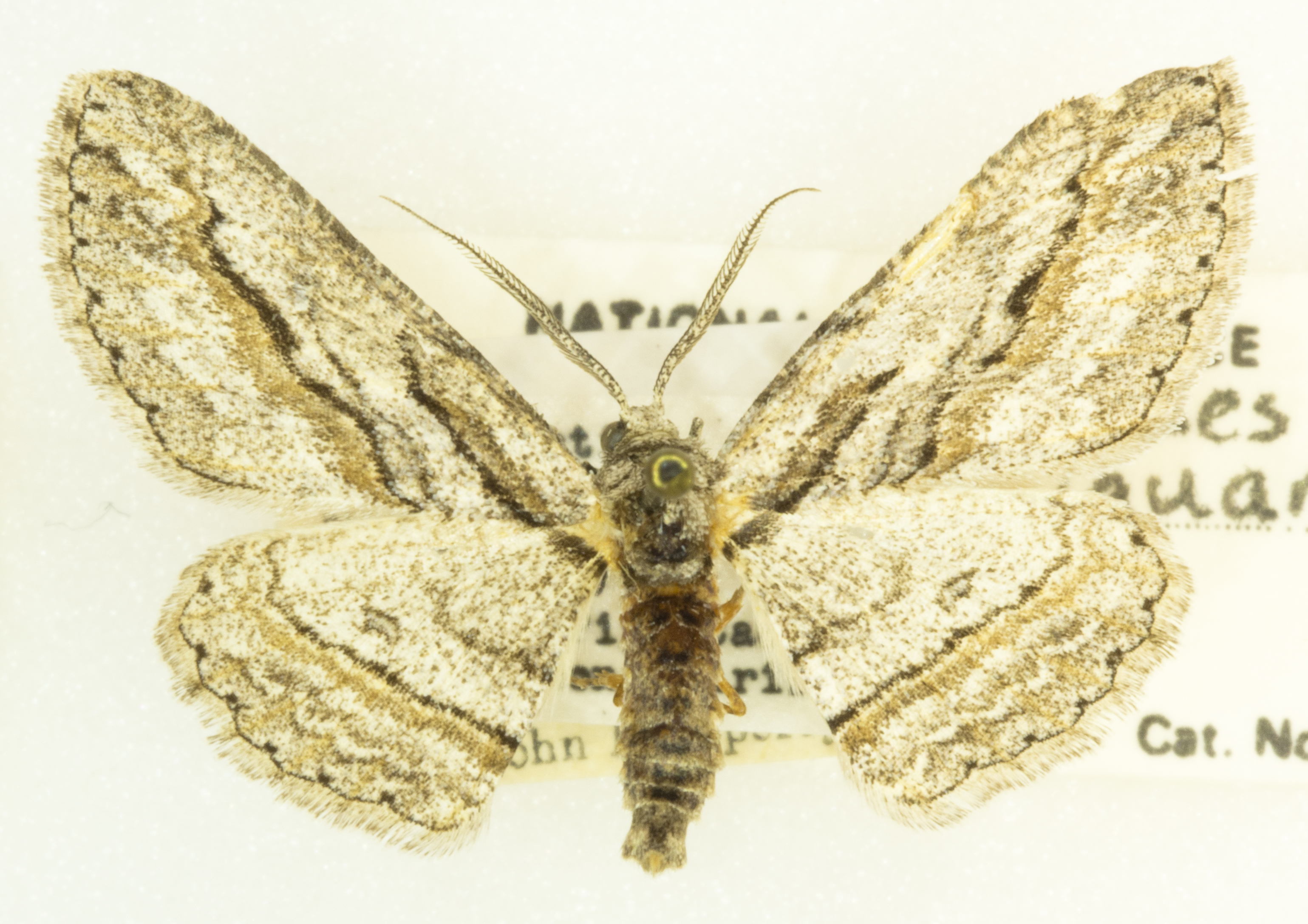

Scientific classification
- Kingdom: Animalia
- Phylum: Arthropoda
- Class: Insecta
- Order: Lepidoptera
- Family: Geometridae
- Genus: Iridopsis
- Species: I. obliquaria

Binomial name
- Iridopsis obliquaria (Grote, 1883)

= Iridopsis obliquaria =

Species of moth

Iridopsis obliquaria, the oblique looper moth, is a species of geometrid moth in the family Geometridae.

The MONA or Hodges number for Iridopsis obliquaria is 6577.
