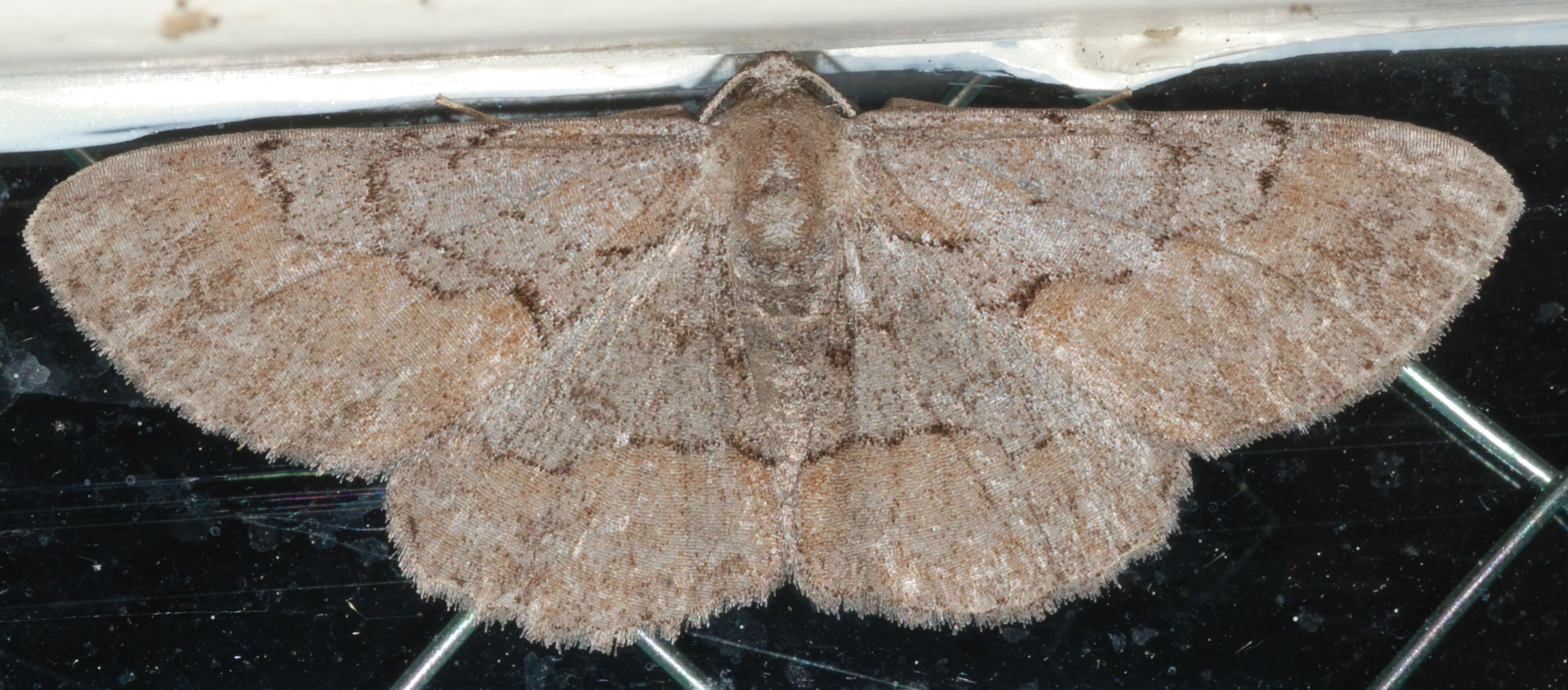
- Iridopsis vellivolata

Scientific classification
- Domain: Eukaryota
- Kingdom: Animalia
- Phylum: Arthropoda
- Class: Insecta
- Order: Lepidoptera
- Family: Geometridae
- Genus: Iridopsis
- Species: I. vellivolata

Binomial name
- Iridopsis vellivolata (Hulst, 1881)

= Iridopsis vellivolata =

Species of moth

Iridopsis vellivolata, the large purplish gray, is a species of geometrid moth in the family Geometridae. It is found in North America.

The MONA or Hodges number for Iridopsis vellivolata is 6582.
