= Iridopsis dataria =

Scientific classification
- Kingdom: Animalia
- Phylum: Arthropoda
- Clade: Pancrustacea
- Class: Insecta
- Order: Lepidoptera
- Family: Geometridae
- Genus: Iridopsis
- Species: I. dataria

Binomial name
- Iridopsis dataria (Grote, 1882)

Species of moth

Iridopsis dataria is a species of geometrid moth in the family Geometridae.
