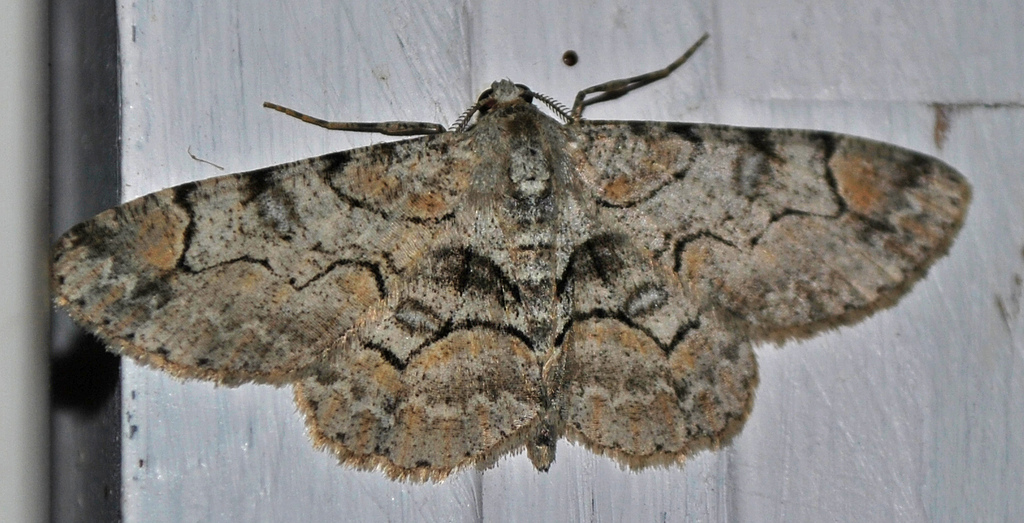
- Iridopsis larvaria

Scientific classification
- Kingdom: Animalia
- Phylum: Arthropoda
- Class: Insecta
- Order: Lepidoptera
- Family: Geometridae
- Subfamily: Ennominae
- Tribe: Boarmiini
- Genus: Iridopsis; Warren, 1894

= Iridopsis =

Genus of moths

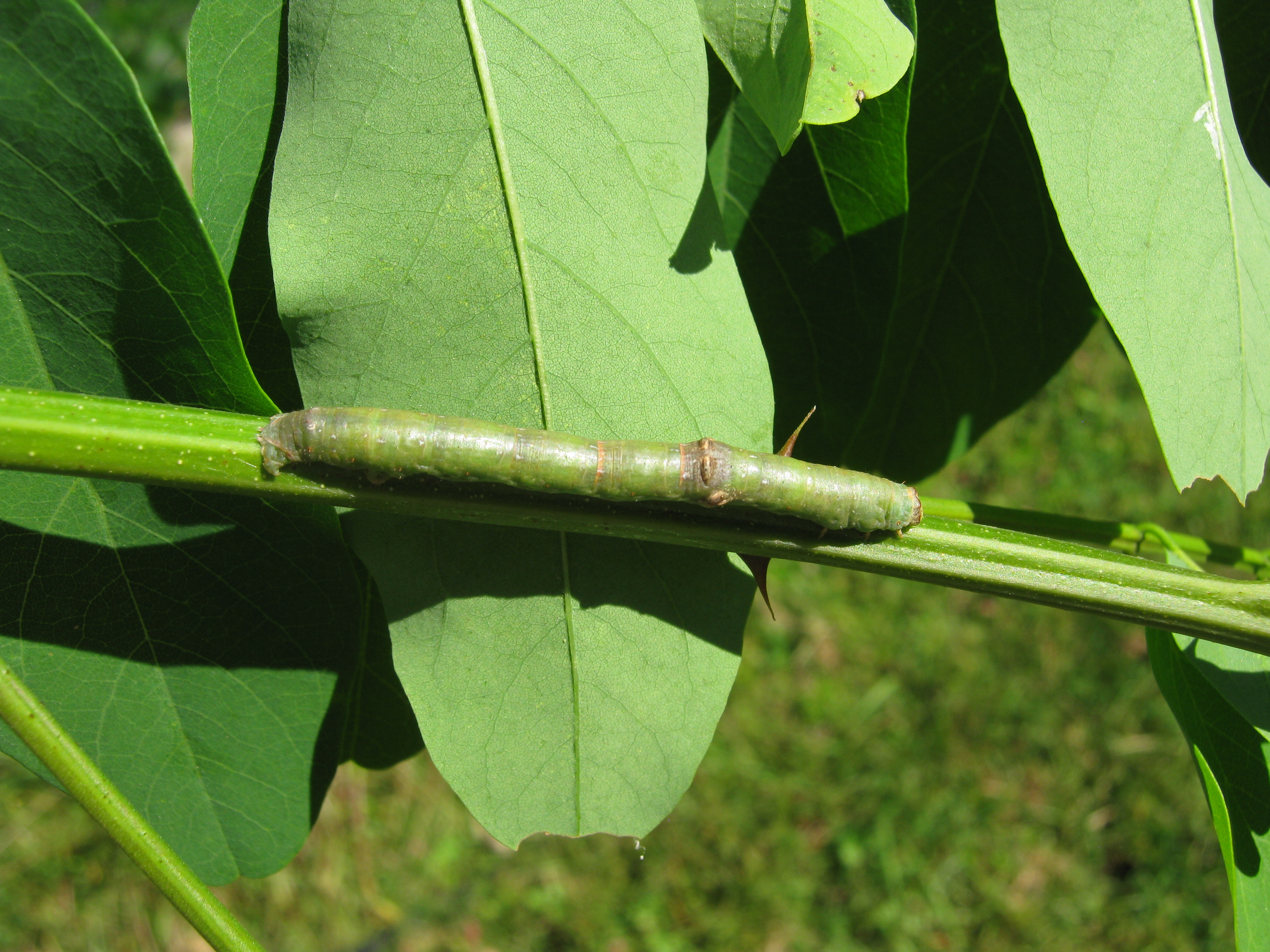
Iridopsis defectaria, larva

Iridopsis is a genus of moths in the family Geometridae first described by Warren in 1894.

== Species ==
The following species are classified in the genus. This species list may be incomplete.

- Iridopsis angulata
- Iridopsis brittonae
- Iridopsis clivinaria – mountain mahogany looper moth
- Iridopsis cypressaria
- Iridopsis dataria
- Iridopsis defectaria – brown-shaded gray moth
- Iridopsis emasculatum
- Iridopsis ephyraria – pale-winged gray moth
- Iridopsis fragilaria
- Iridopsis gemella
- Iridopsis humaria – small purplish gray moth
- Iridopsis jacumbaria
- Iridopsis larvaria – bent-line gray moth
- Iridopsis obliquaria – oblique looper moth
- Iridopsis perfectaria
- Iridopsis pergracilis – cypress looper moth
- Iridopsis profanata
- Iridopsis providentia
- Iridopsis pseudoherse
- Iridopsis sancta
- Iridopsis sanctissima
- Iridopsis vellivolata – large purplish gray moth
