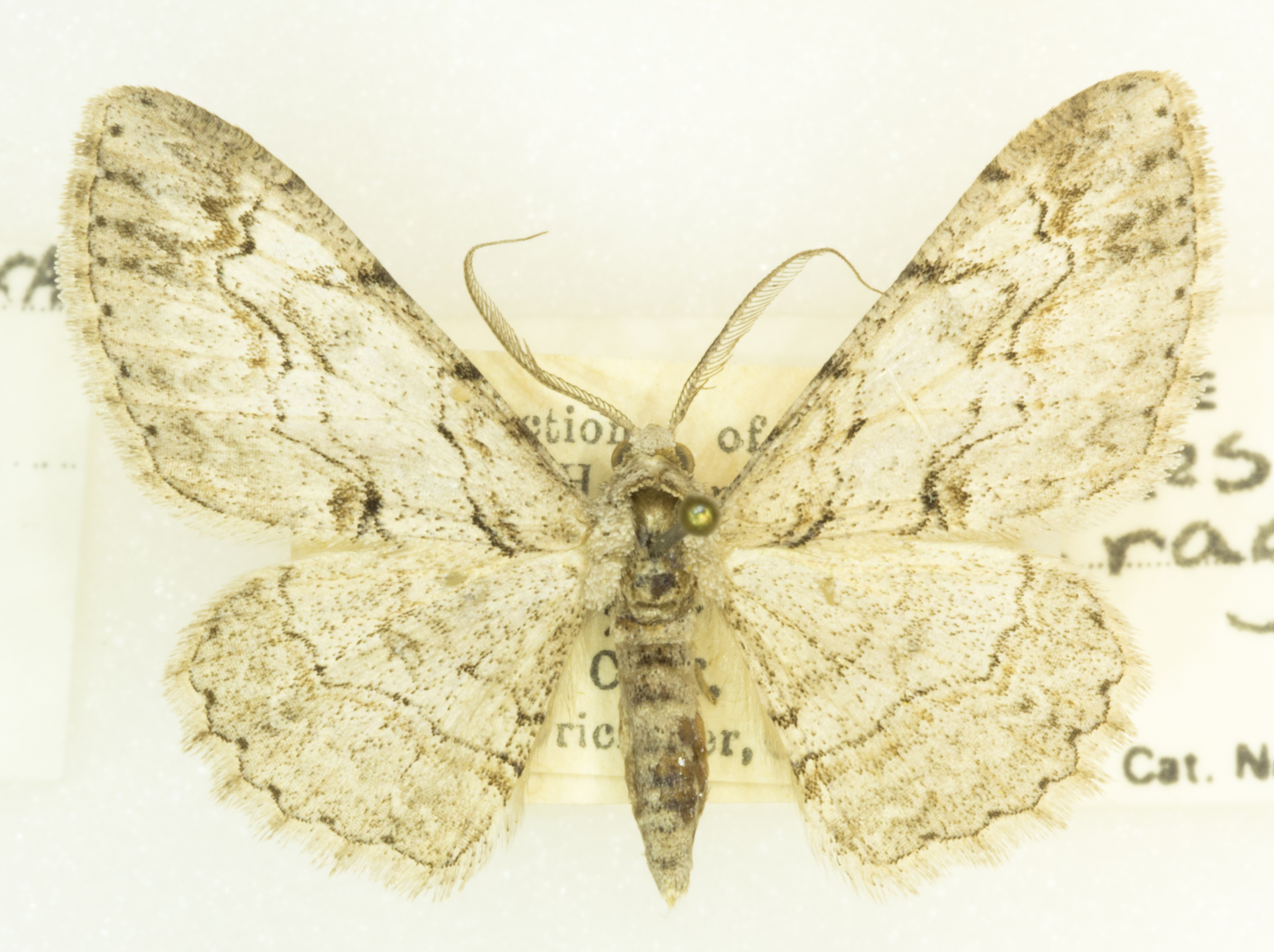
- Iridopsis fragilaria

Scientific classification
- Kingdom: Animalia
- Phylum: Arthropoda
- Clade: Pancrustacea
- Class: Insecta
- Order: Lepidoptera
- Family: Geometridae
- Tribe: Boarmiini
- Genus: Iridopsis
- Species: I. fragilaria

Binomial name
- Iridopsis fragilaria (Grossbeck, 1909)

= Iridopsis fragilaria =

Species of moth

Iridopsis fragilaria is a species of geometrid moth in the family Geometridae. It is found in Central America, North America, and Oceania.

The MONA or Hodges number for Iridopsis fragilaria is 6585.
