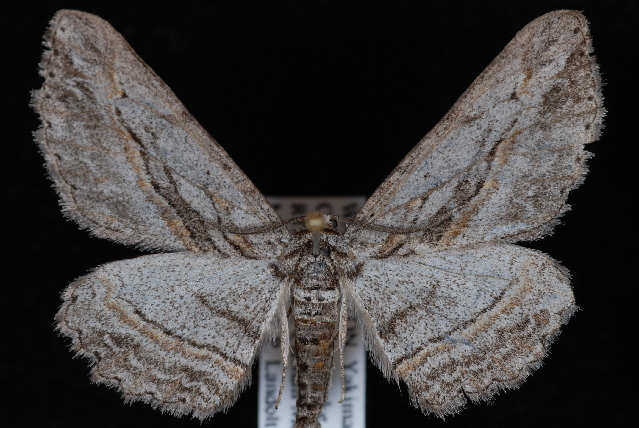

Scientific classification
- Kingdom: Animalia
- Phylum: Arthropoda
- Clade: Pancrustacea
- Class: Insecta
- Order: Lepidoptera
- Family: Geometridae
- Genus: Iridopsis
- Species: I. clivinaria

Binomial name
- Iridopsis clivinaria (Guenée, [1858])

Synonyms
- Anacamptodes clivinaria

= Iridopsis clivinaria =

Species of moth

Iridopsis clivinaria, the mountain mahogany looper moth, is a moth of the family Geometridae. It is found from British Columbia south to California and east to Idaho, Colorado and Arizona.

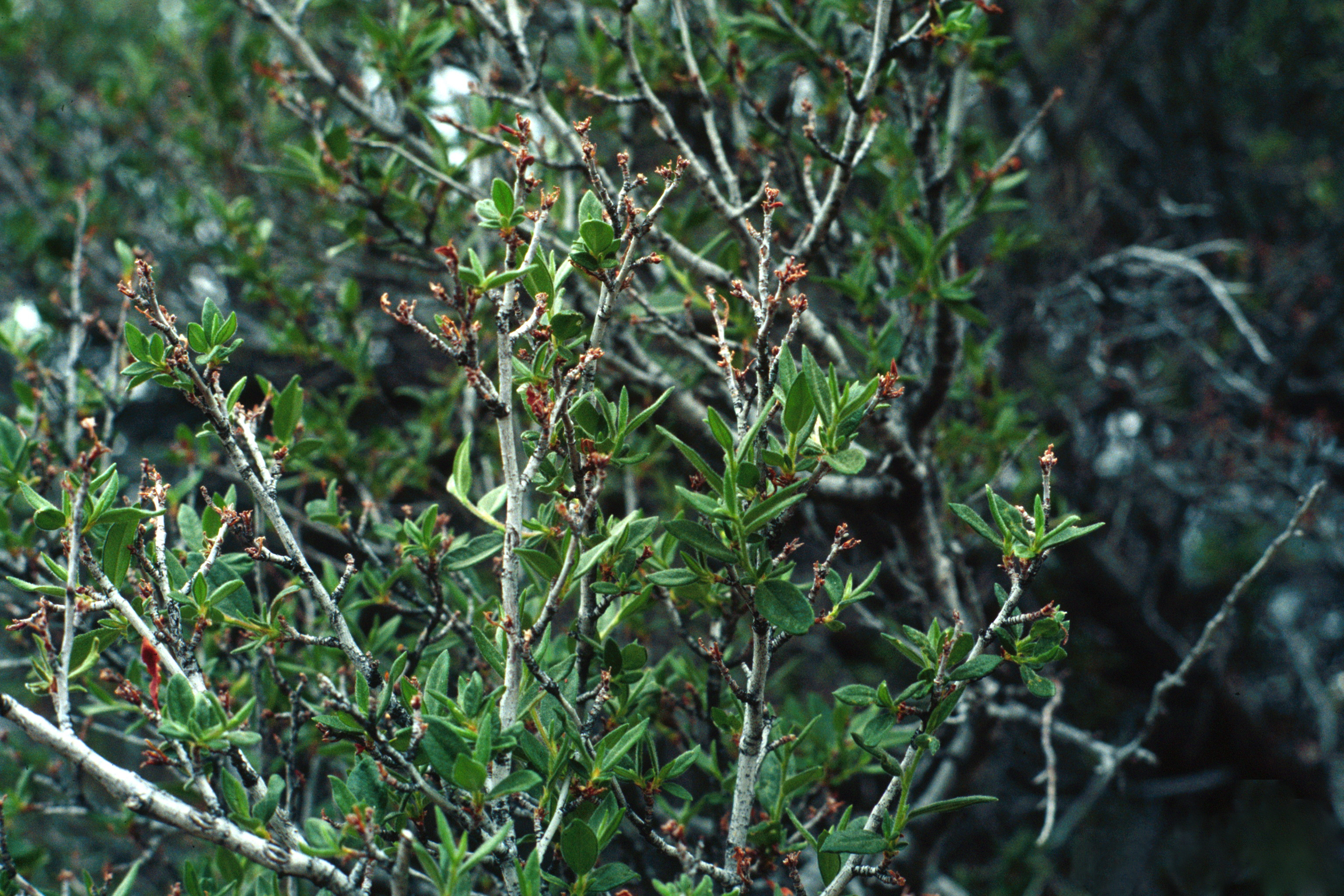
Damage

The length of the forewings is 22–25 mm. They are on wing from March to July in one generation per year.

The larvae mainly feed on the leaves of Cercocarpus species and Purshia tridentata, but have also been recorded on Prunus species and Ceanothus velutinus. Young larvae skeletonise the leaves of their host plant.

== Subspecies ==
- Iridopsis clivinaria clivinaria
- Iridopsis clivinaria impia Rindge, 1966
- Iridopsis clivinaria profanata (Barnes & McDunnough, 1917)
