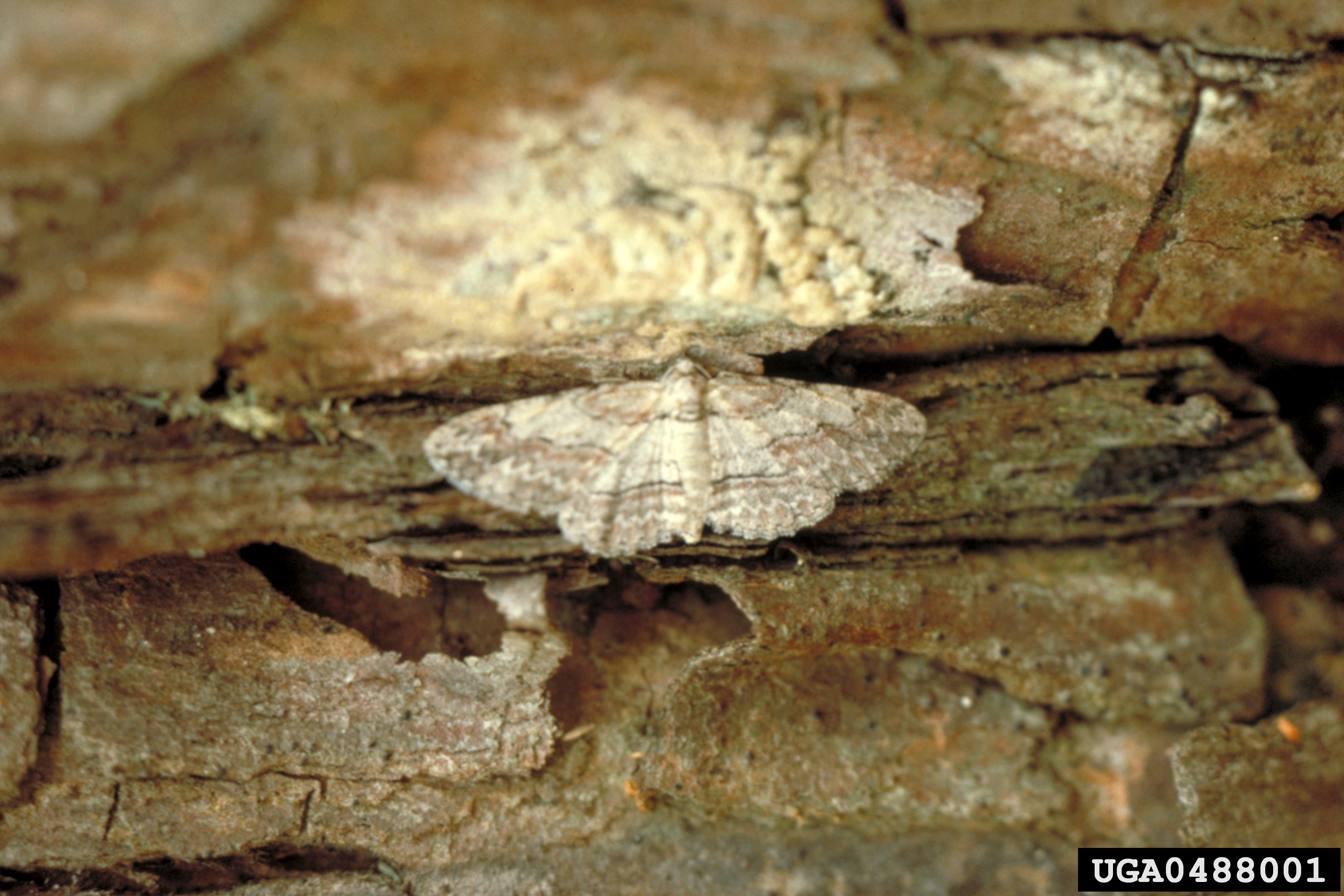

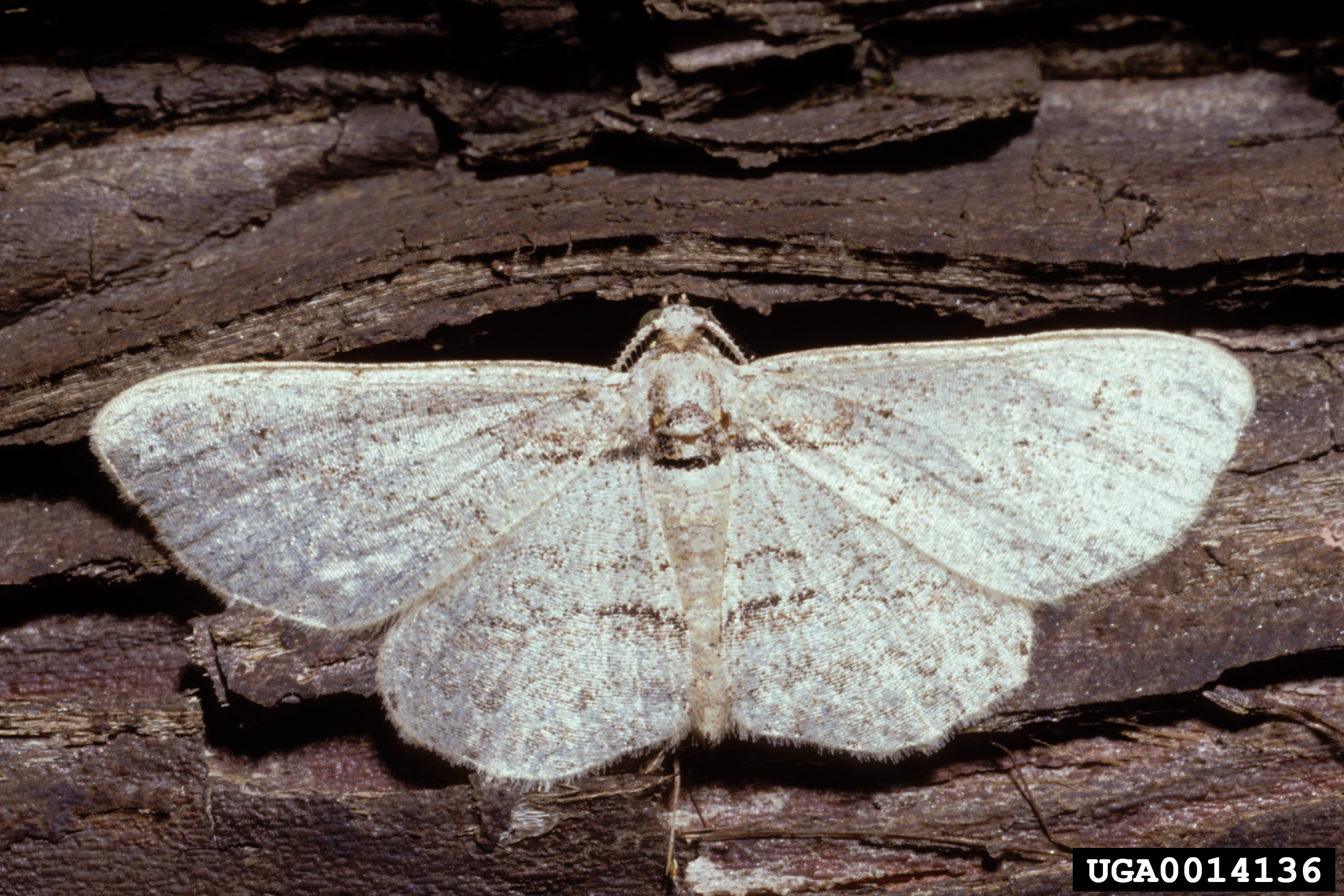

Scientific classification
- Domain: Eukaryota
- Kingdom: Animalia
- Phylum: Arthropoda
- Class: Insecta
- Order: Lepidoptera
- Family: Geometridae
- Subfamily: Ennominae
- Tribe: Boarmiini
- Genus: Iridopsis
- Species: I. pergracilis

Binomial name
- Iridopsis pergracilis (Hulst, 1900)

Synonyms
- Synelys pergracilis Hulst 1900; Anacamptodes pergracilis

= Iridopsis pergracilis =

Species of moth

Iridopsis pergracilis, the cypress looper moth, is a moth of the family Geometridae. The species was first described by George Duryea Hulst in 1900. It is found in the US from Maryland to Florida.

The wingspan is 26–28 mm.

The larvae feed on Taxodium distichum (including Taxodium distichum var. nutans).

== Gallery ==
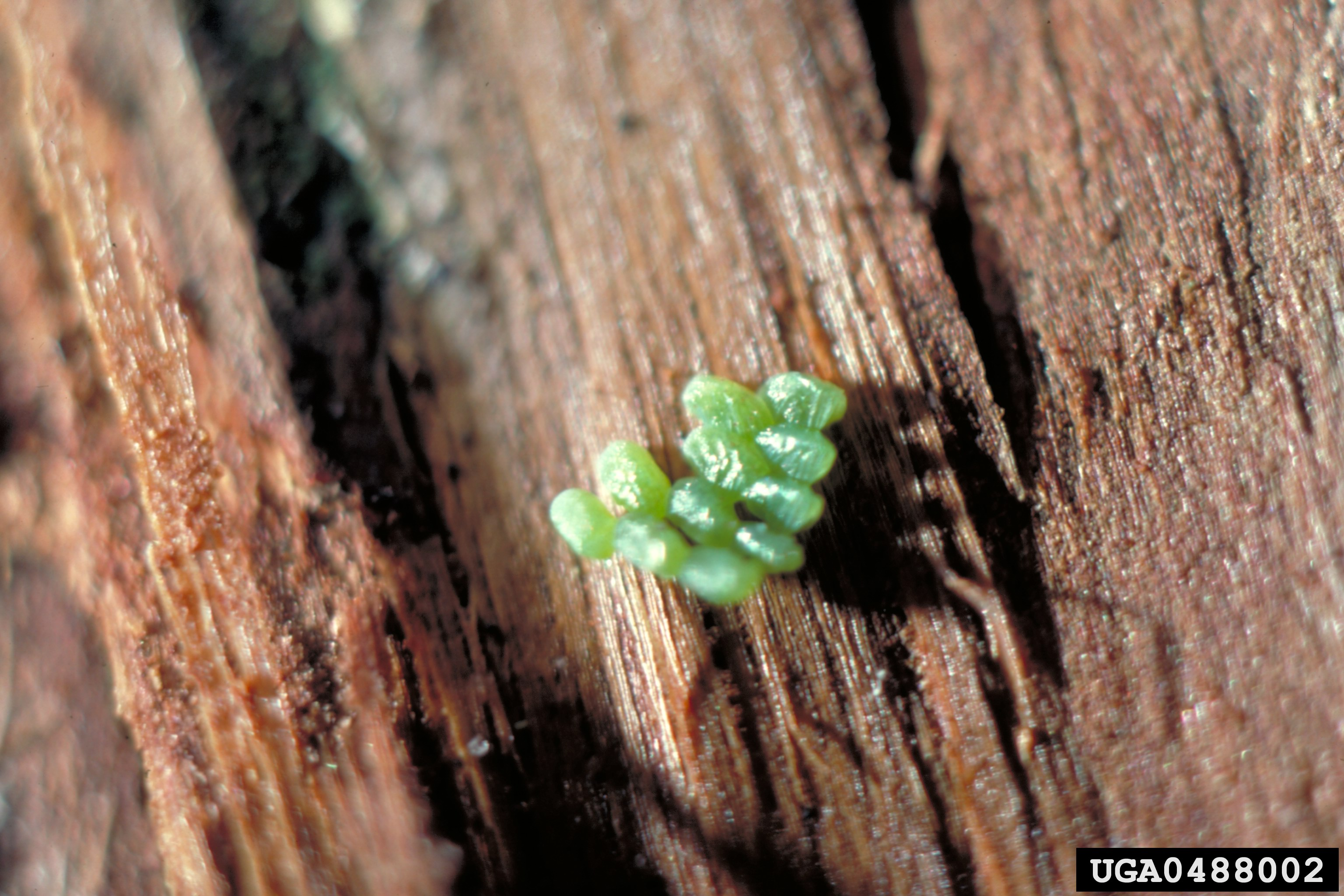
Eggs

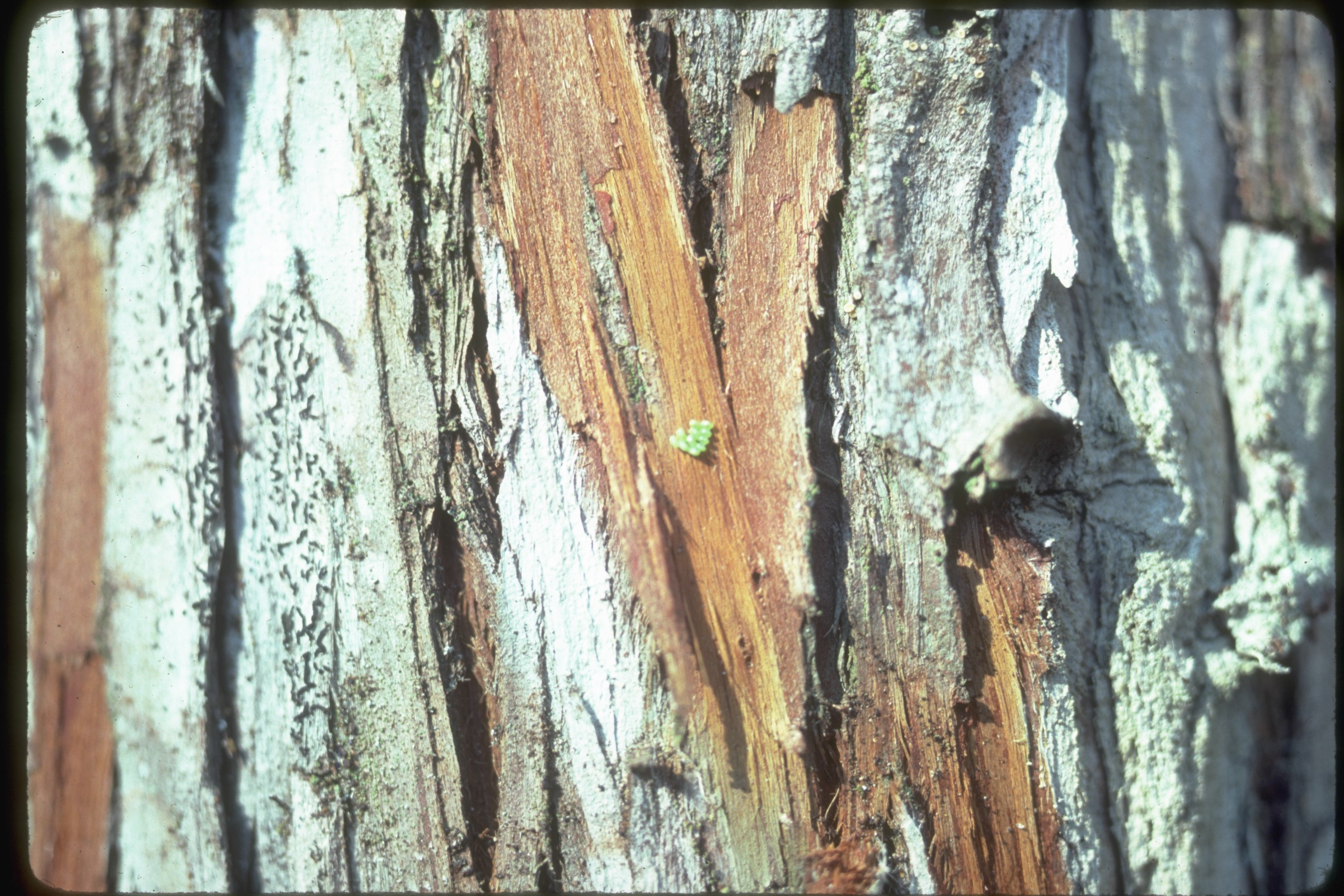
Eggs

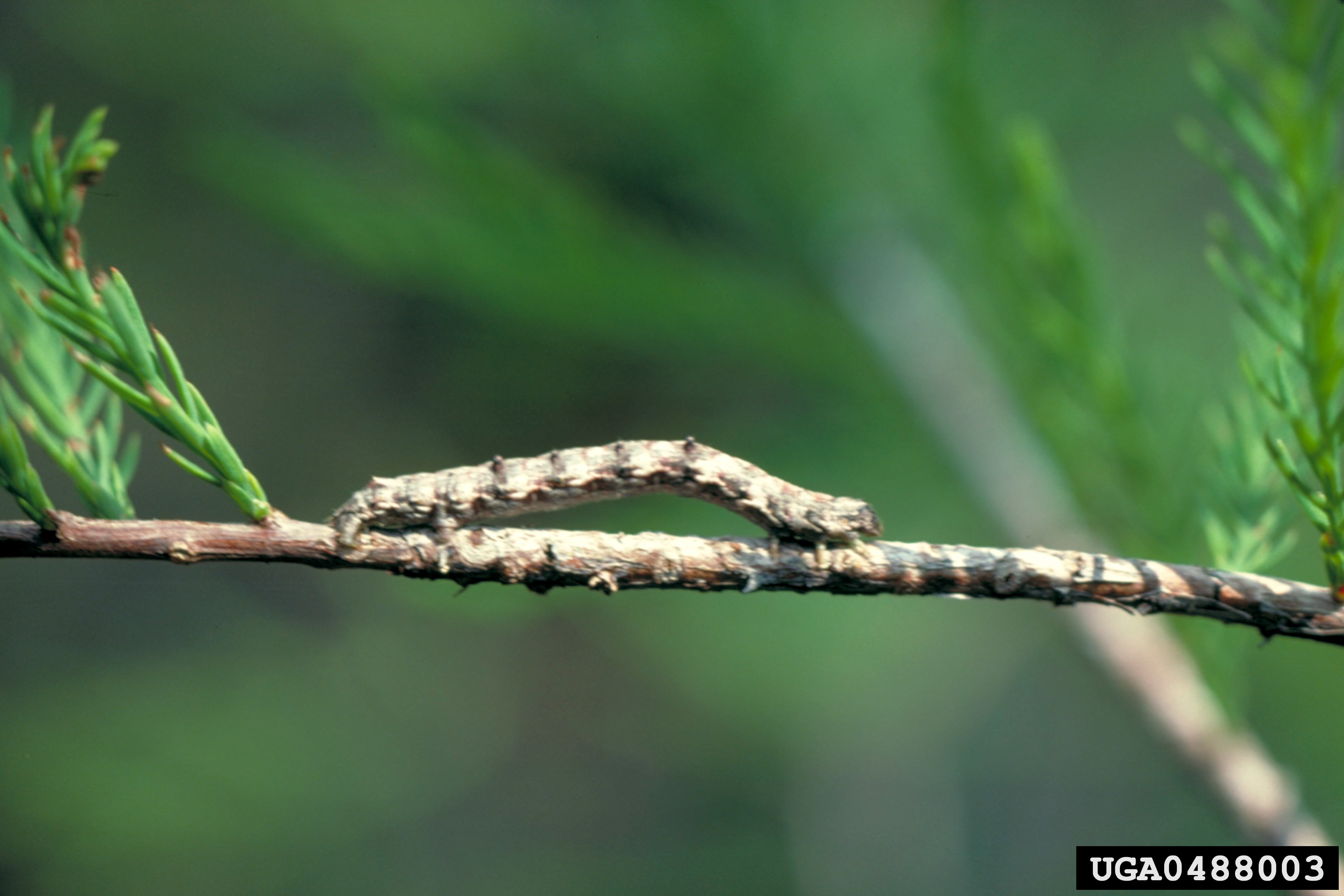
Larva

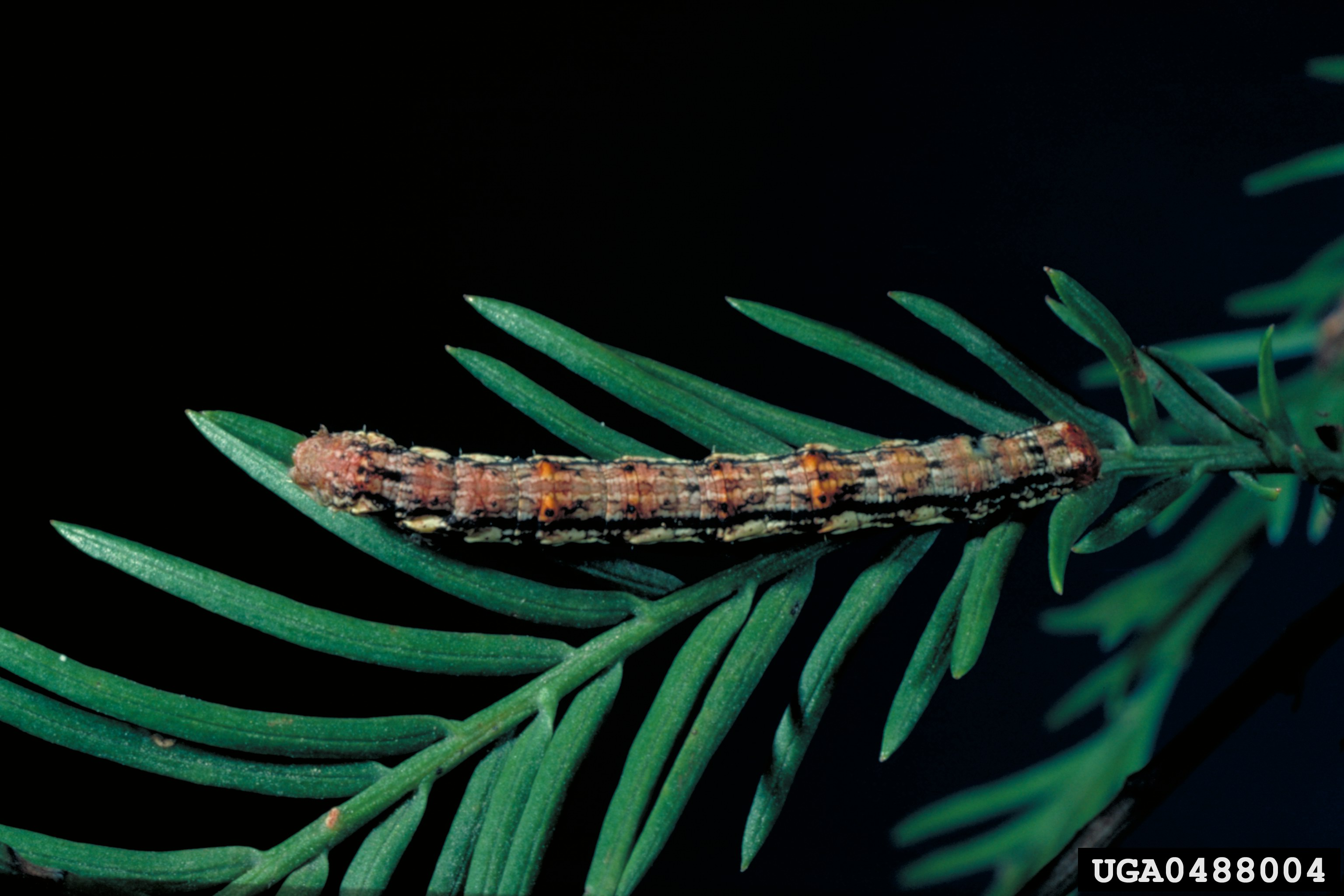
Larva

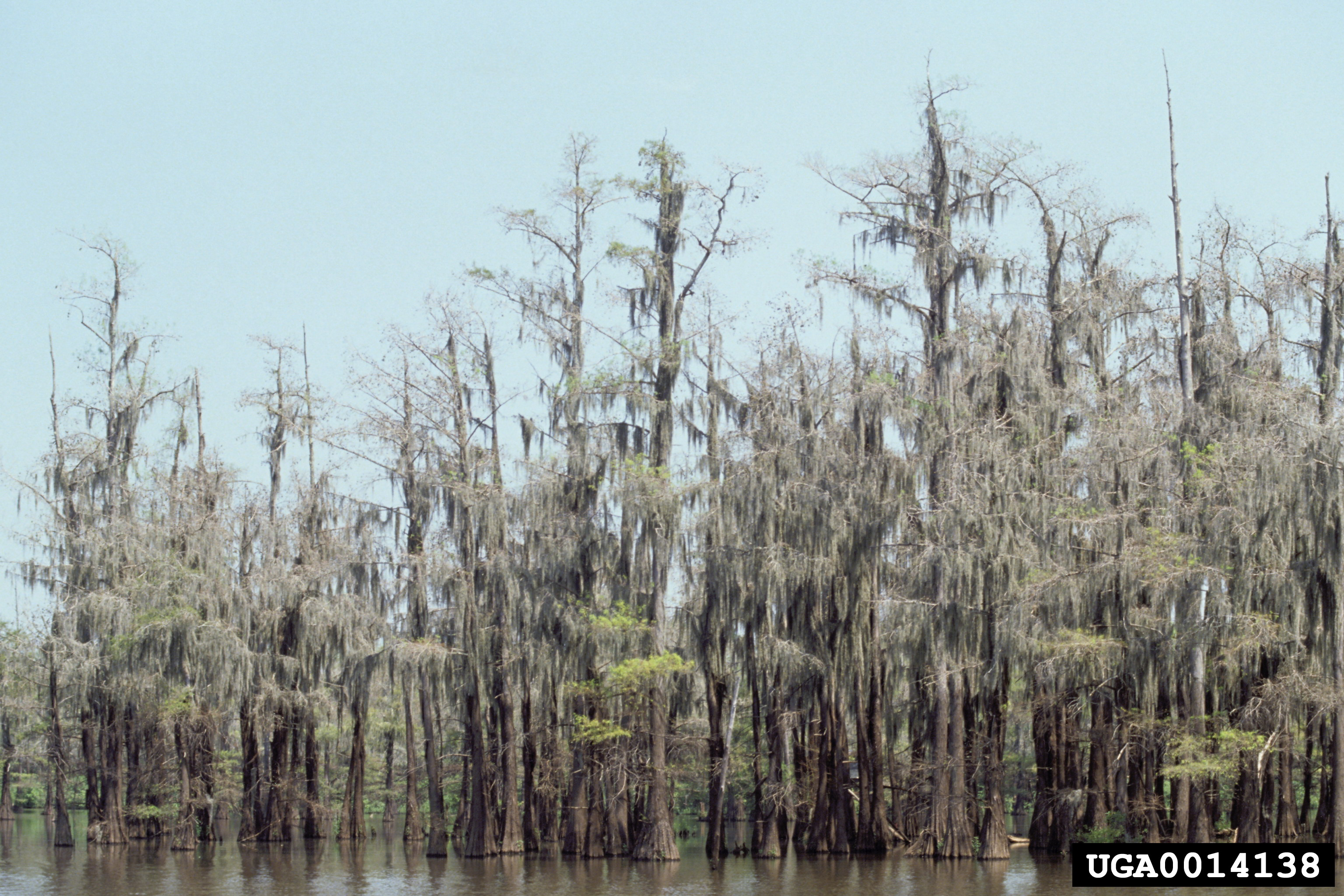
Damage

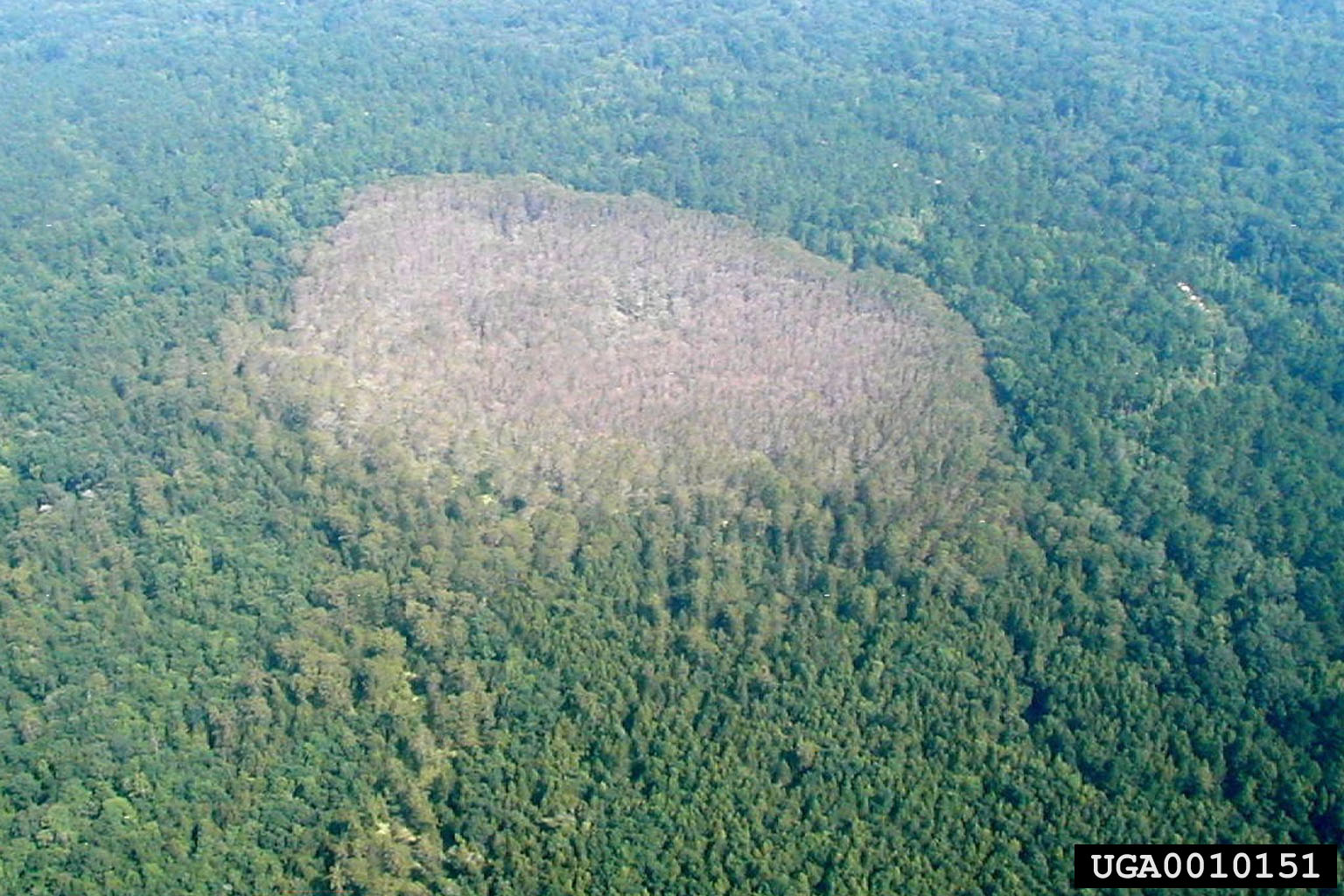
Damage

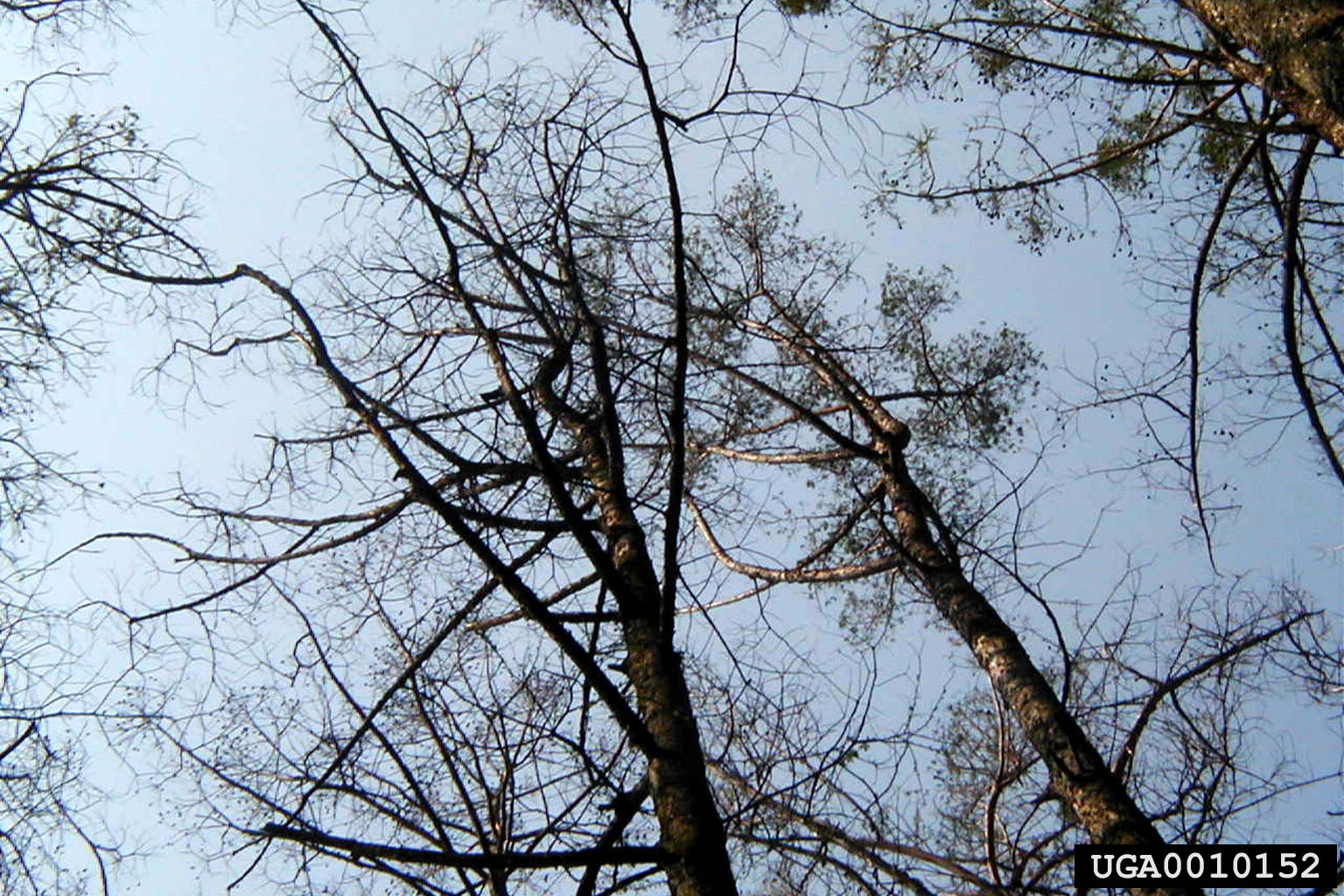
Damage

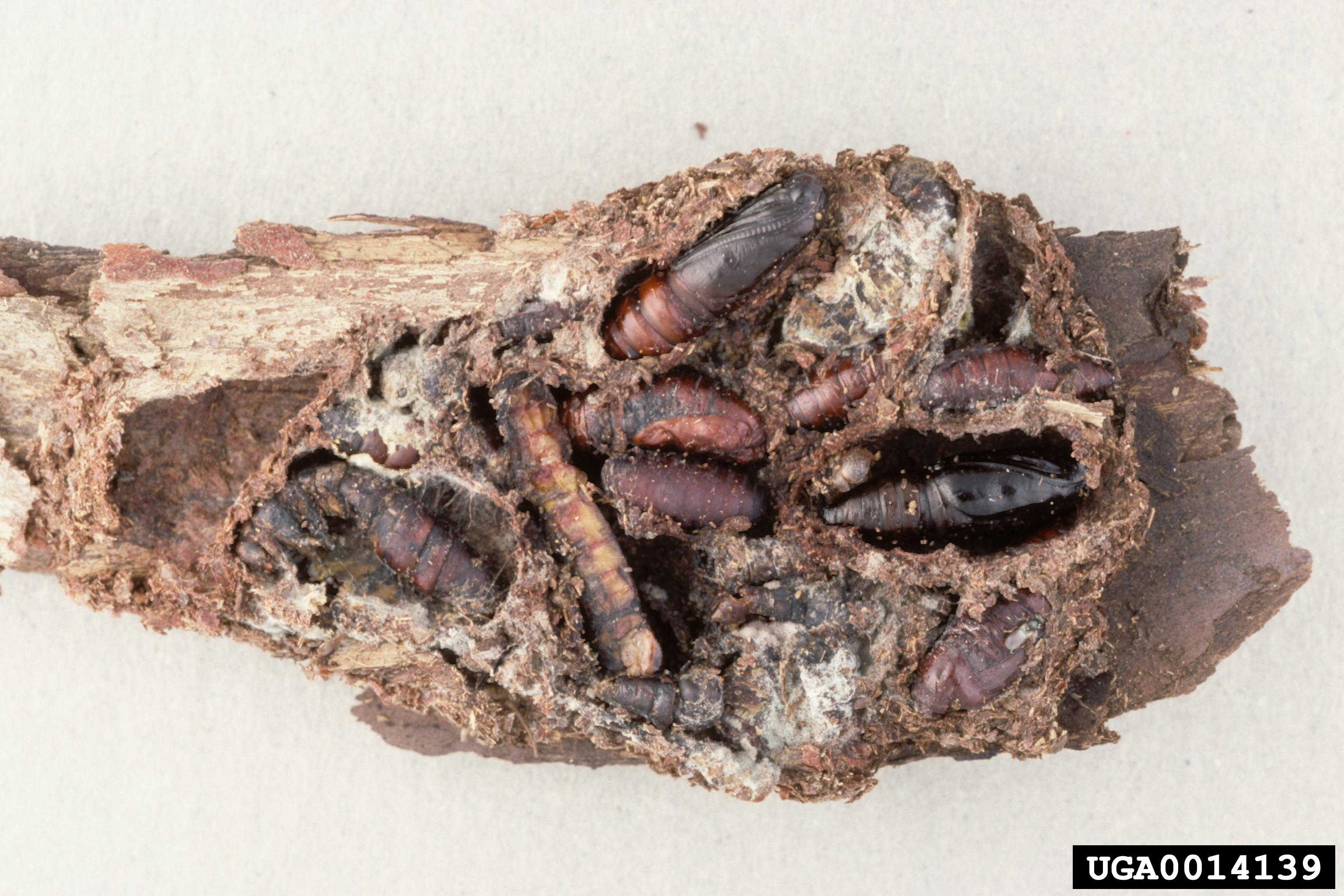
Pupae

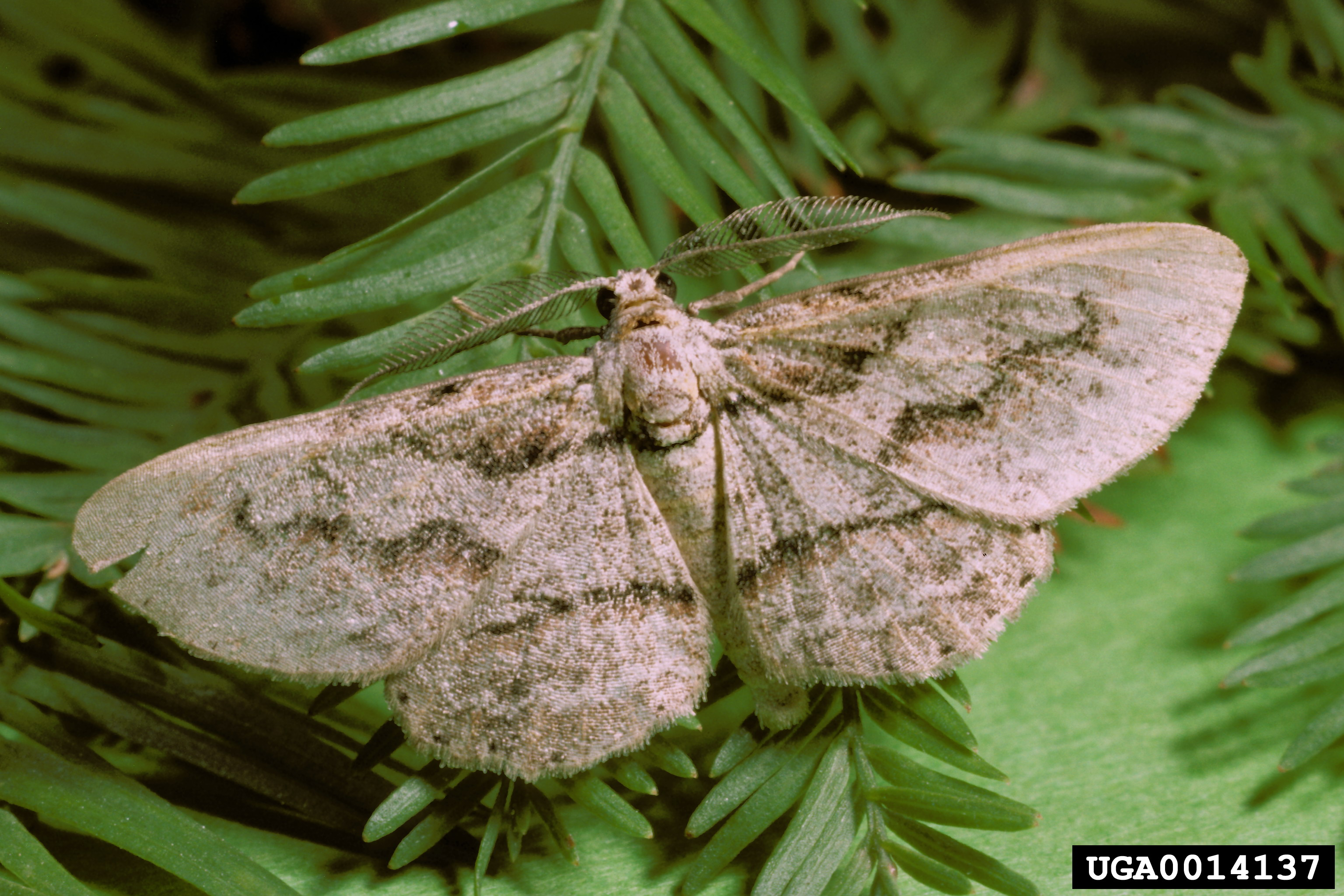
Adult
