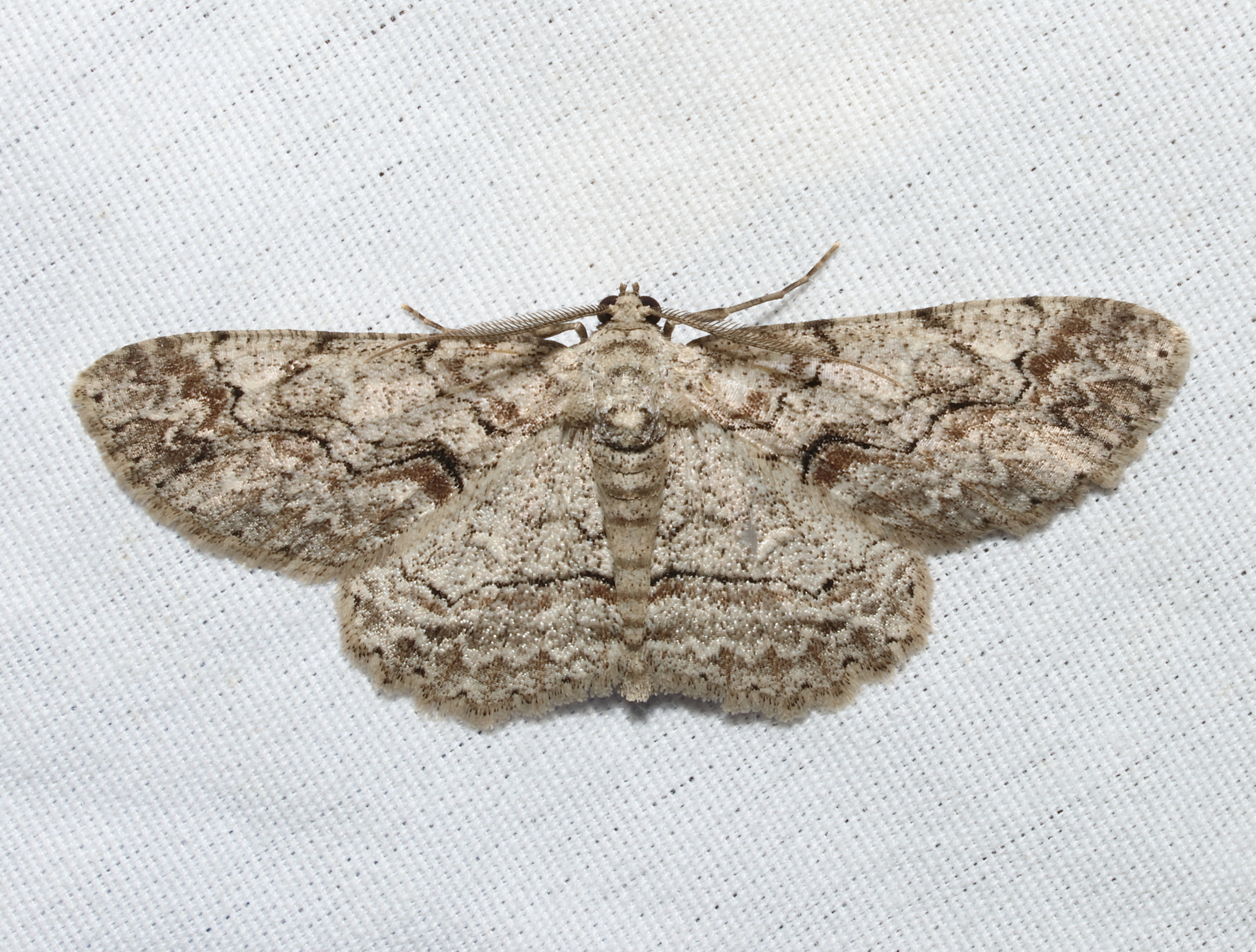

Scientific classification
- Kingdom: Animalia
- Phylum: Arthropoda
- Class: Insecta
- Order: Lepidoptera
- Family: Geometridae
- Subfamily: Ennominae
- Tribe: Boarmiini
- Genus: Anacamptodes
- Species: A. defectaria

Binomial name
- Anacamptodes defectaria Guenée, 1857

Synonyms
- Anacamptodes albigenaria (Walker, 1860); Iridopsis defectaria

= Anacamptodes defectaria =

Species of moth

Anacamptodes defectaria, the brown-shaded gray moth, is a moth of the family Geometridae. It is found from Pennsylvania, west to Iowa and Kansas, south to Texas, and south and east to Florida.

The wingspan is about 30 mm. Adults are on wing from February to November depending on the location.

The larvae feed on oak, poplar, sweet cherry and willow.

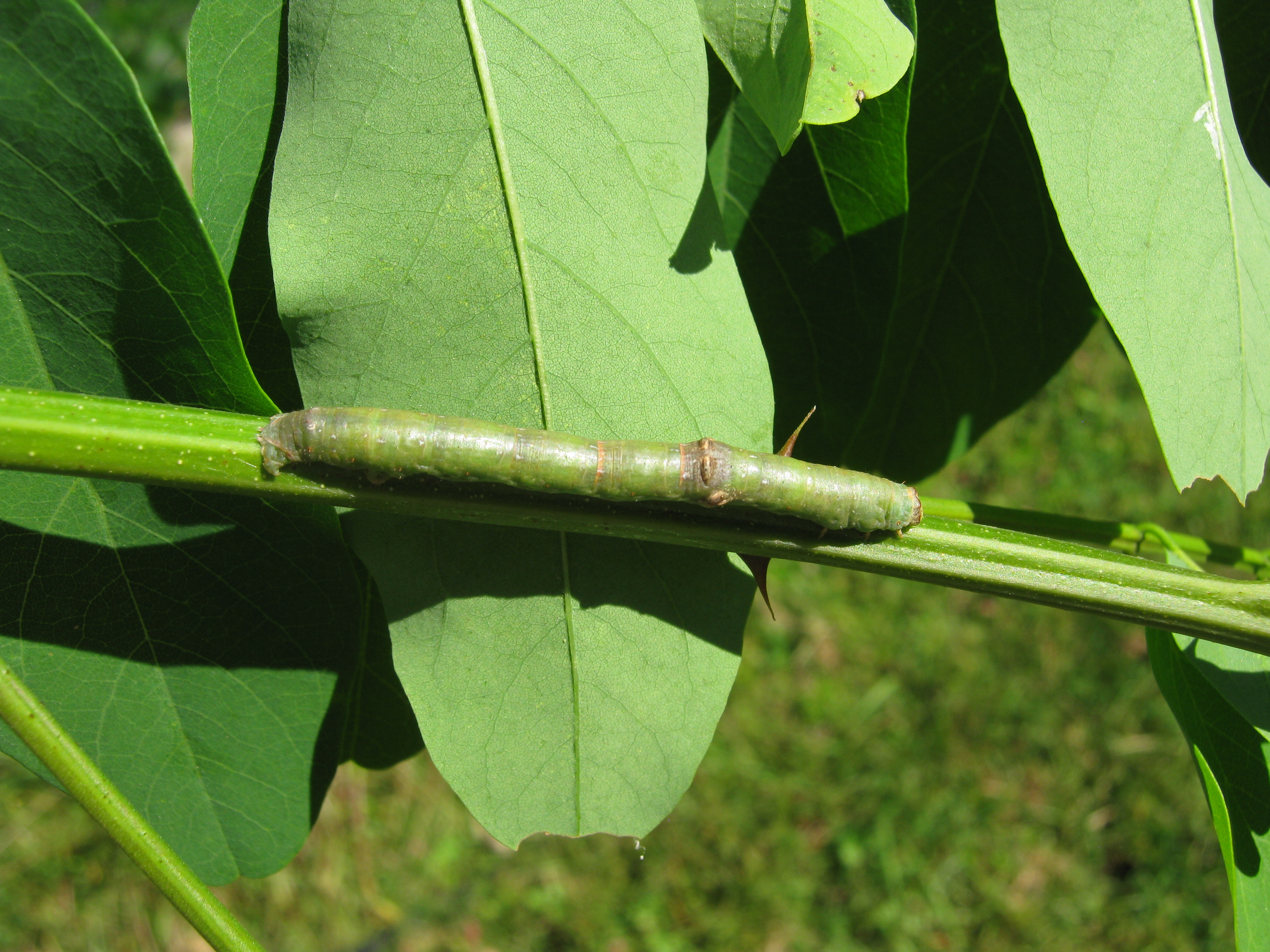
Larva
