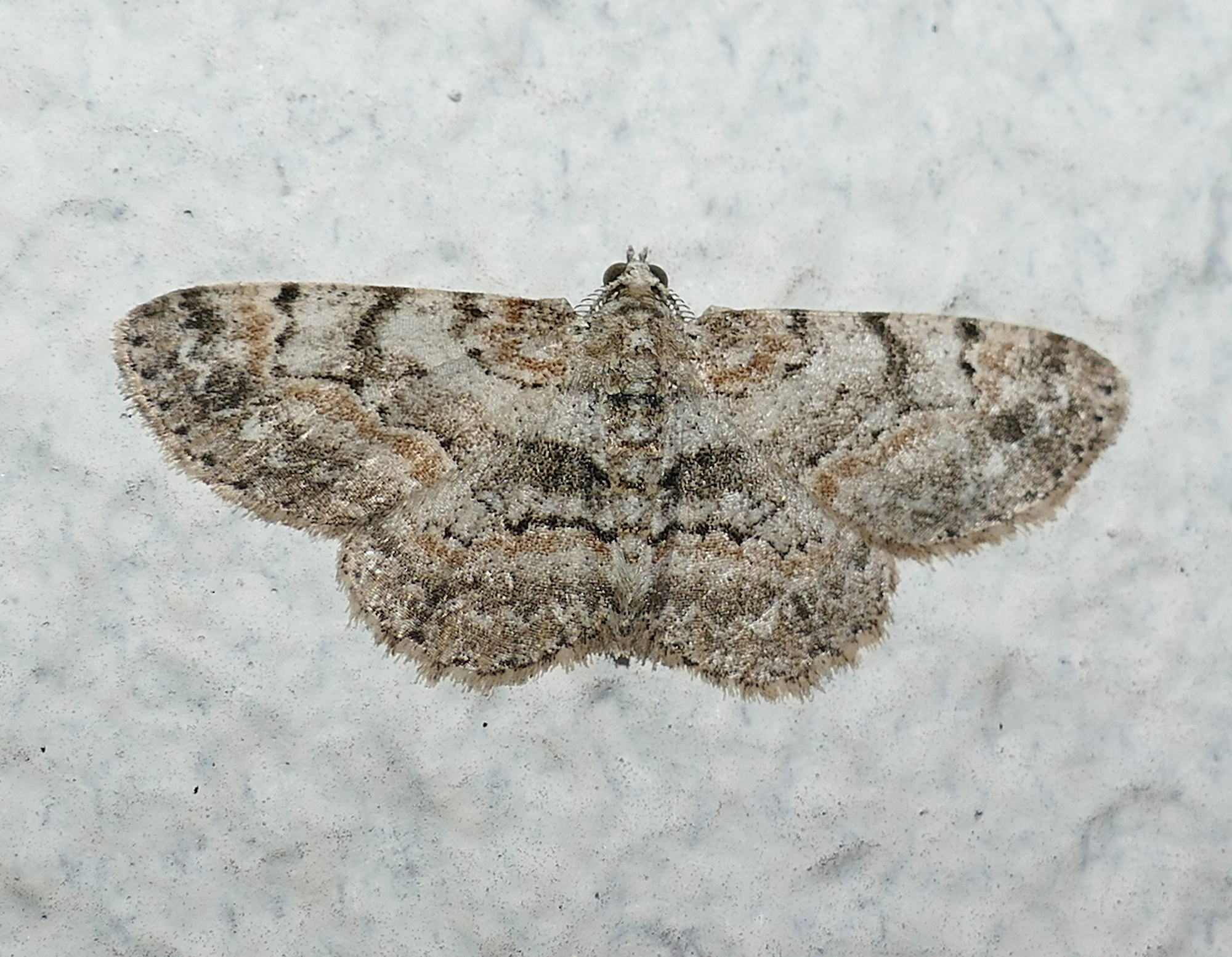

Scientific classification
- Kingdom: Animalia
- Phylum: Arthropoda
- Class: Insecta
- Order: Lepidoptera
- Family: Geometridae
- Subfamily: Ennominae
- Tribe: Boarmiini
- Genus: Iridopsis
- Species: I. ephyraria

Binomial name
- Iridopsis ephyraria (Walker, 1860)

Synonyms
- Boarmia ephyraria Walker, 1860; Anacamptodes ephyraria; Anacamptodes expressaria (Walker, 1863); Cleora takenaria Pearsall, 1909

= Iridopsis ephyraria =

Species of moth

Iridopsis ephyraria, commonly known as the pale-winged gray, is a species of moth in the family Geometridae. The species was first described by Francis Walker in 1860. It is found in the United States and southern Canada east of the Rocky Mountains, from New Brunswick to Florida, west to Texas and north to Alberta.

The wingspan is 23–28 mm.

Adults are on wing from June to September.

The larvae feed on a wide range of woody plants Fraxinus, Abies balsamea, Betula, Prunus virginiana, Tsuga canadensis, Ulmus, Ribes uva-crispa, Acer and Salix species.

Pimpla pedalis is a parasitoid of I. ephyraria pupae.
