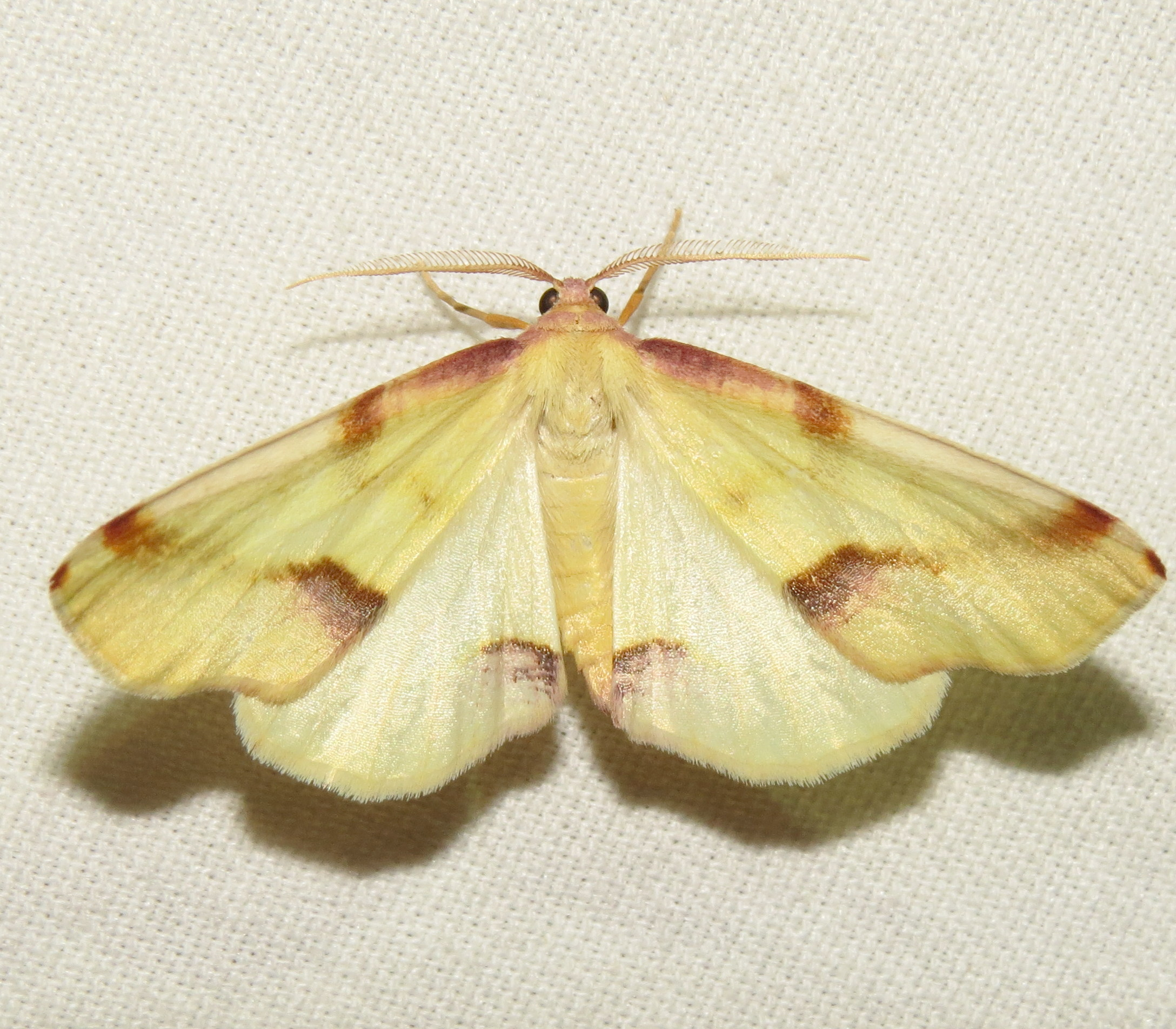

Scientific classification
- Domain: Eukaryota
- Kingdom: Animalia
- Phylum: Arthropoda
- Class: Insecta
- Order: Lepidoptera
- Family: Geometridae
- Genus: Plagodis
- Species: P. serinaria

Binomial name
- Plagodis serinaria Herrich-Schaffer, 1855

= Plagodis serinaria =

Species of moth

Plagodis serinaria, the lemon plagodis, is a species of geometrid moth in the family Geometridae. It is found in North America.
