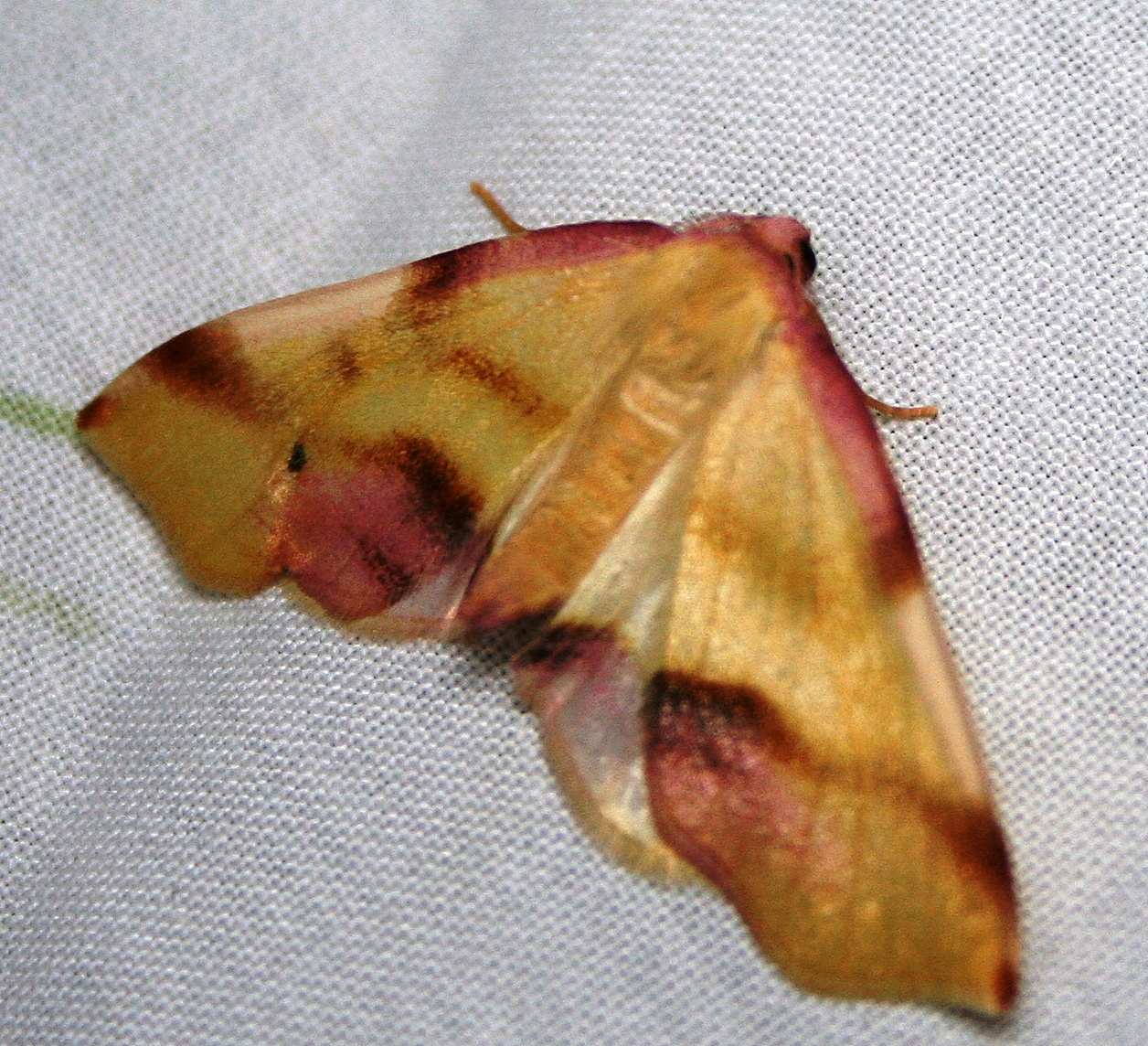

Scientific classification
- Kingdom: Animalia
- Phylum: Arthropoda
- Clade: Pancrustacea
- Class: Insecta
- Order: Lepidoptera
- Family: Geometridae
- Genus: Plagodis
- Species: P. phlogosaria

Binomial name
- Plagodis phlogosaria Guenée, 1857

Synonyms
- Plagodis altruaria; Plagodis intermediaria

= Plagodis phlogosaria =

Species of moth

Plagodis phlogosaria, the scorched wing or straight-lined plagodis, is a species of moth of the family Geometridae. It is found in all of North America except the far south and Yukon and Alaska.

The wingspan is 28–38 mm. The moth flies from April to August depending on the location.

The larvae feed on alder, basswood, birch, black cherry, chokecherry, hazel and willow.

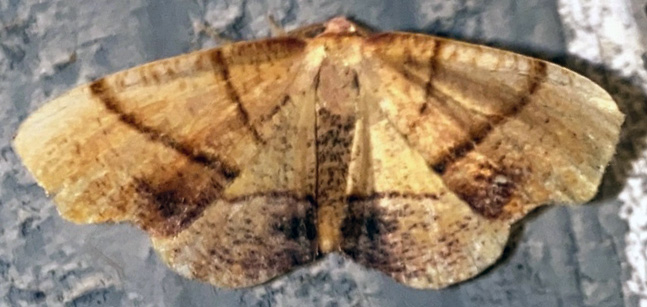
Plagodis phlogosaria found in Oregon

== Subspecies ==
The following subspecies are recognised:

- Plagodis phlogosaria iris
- Plagodis phlogosaria bowmanaria
- Plagodis phlogosaria approximaria
- Plagodis phlogosaria keutzingaria
- Plagodis phlogosaria purpuraria Pearsall
- Plagodis phlogosaria illinoiaria
