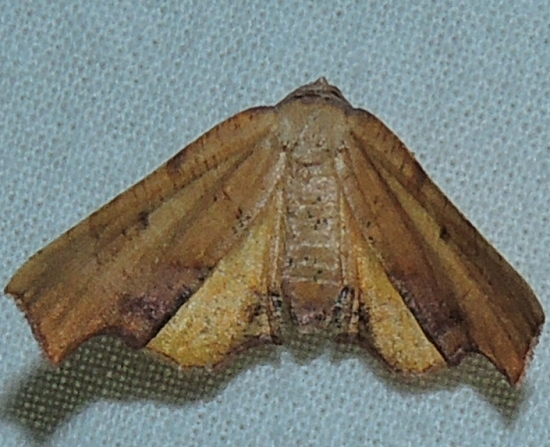

Scientific classification
- Kingdom: Animalia
- Phylum: Arthropoda
- Clade: Pancrustacea
- Class: Insecta
- Order: Lepidoptera
- Family: Geometridae
- Subfamily: Ennominae
- Genus: Plagodis
- Species: P. fervidaria

Binomial name
- Plagodis fervidaria (Herrich-Schäffer, 1855)

= Plagodis fervidaria =

Species of moth

Plagodis fervidaria, the fervid plagodis, is a species of geometrid moth in the family Geometridae. It is found in North America.

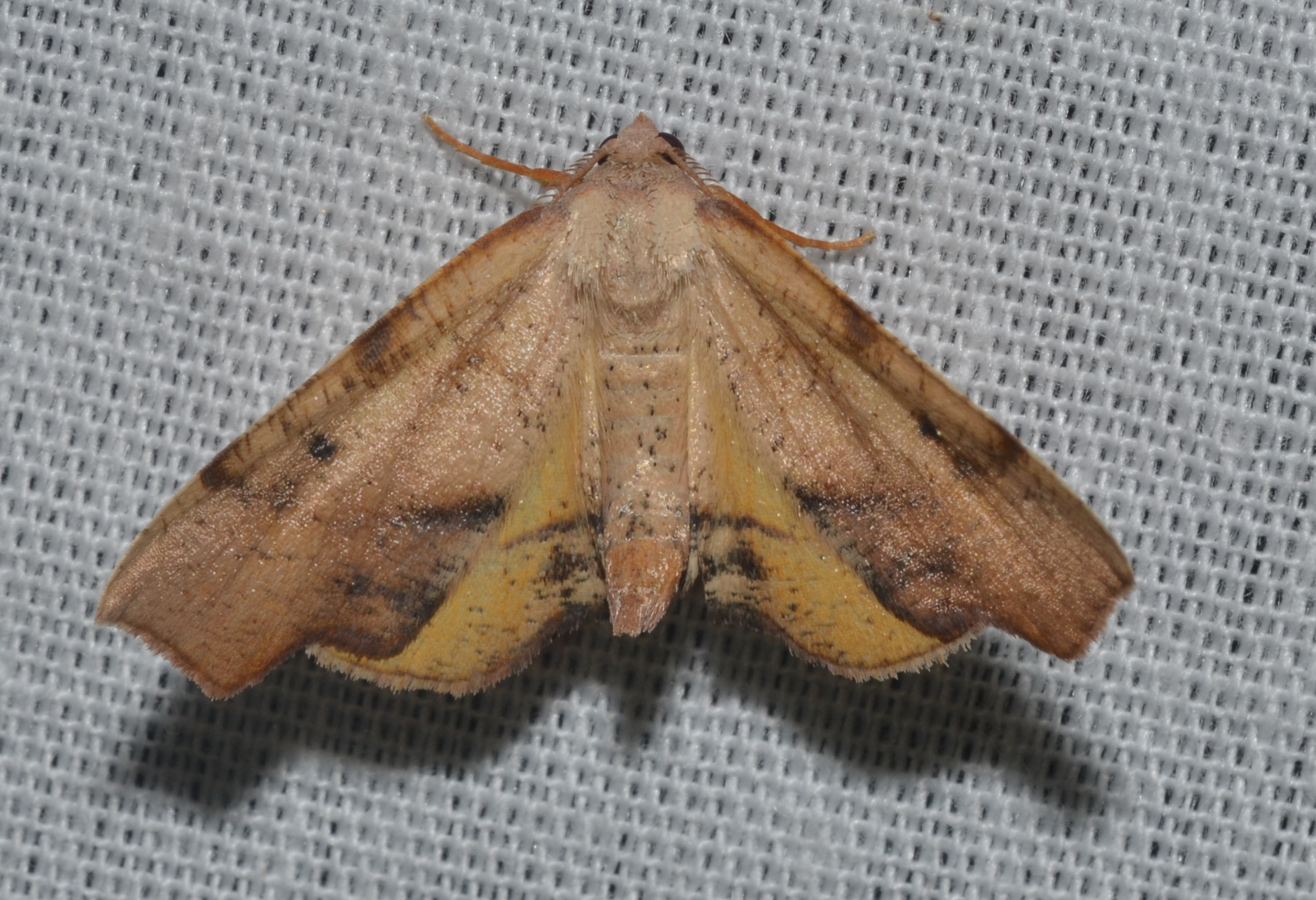
Fervid plagodis, Plagodis fervidaria
