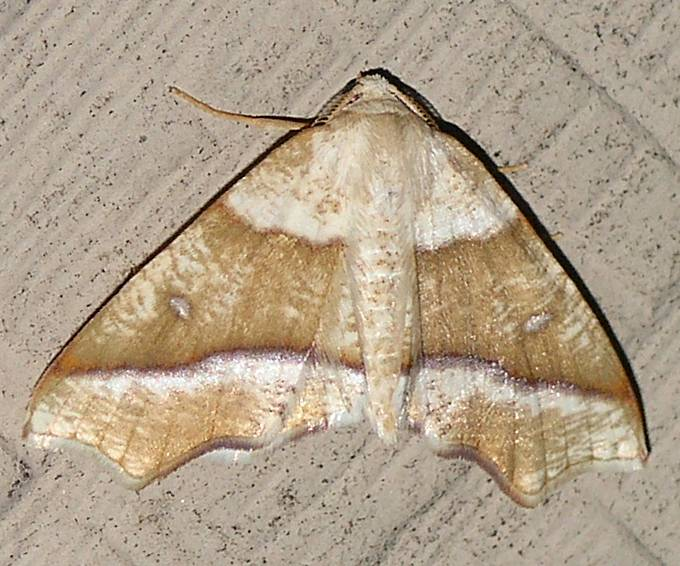
- Plagodis alcoolaria

Scientific classification
- Kingdom: Animalia
- Phylum: Arthropoda
- Class: Insecta
- Order: Lepidoptera
- Family: Geometridae
- Subfamily: Ennominae
- Genus: Plagodis; Hübner, [1823]

Synonyms
- Anagoga Hübner, [1823]; Azinephora Stephens, 1827; Numeria Duponchel, 1829; Eurymene Duponchel, 1829; Eurimene Rondani, 1872; Axinophora Agassiz, 1847; Anagoge Stephens, 1850; Apoplagodis Wehrli, 1939

= Plagodis =

Genus of moths

Plagodis is a genus of moths in the family Geometridae erected by Jacob Hübner in 1825.

== Selected species ==
- Plagodis alcoolaria Guenée, 1857) - hollow-spotted plagodis
- Plagodis dolabraria (Linnaeus, 1767) - scorched wing
- Plagodis fervidaria (Herrich-Schäffer, 1855) - fervid plagodis
- Plagodis kuetzingi (Grote, 1876) - purple plagodis
- Plagodis occiduaria Walker, 1861
- Plagodis ochraceata Viidalepp, 1988
- Plagodis phlogosaria Guenée, 1857 - scorched wing or straight-lined plagodis
- Plagodis pulveraria (Linnaeus, 1758) - barred umber
- Plagodis reticulata Warren, 1893
- Plagodis serinaria Herrich-Schaffer, 1855 - lemon plagodis
