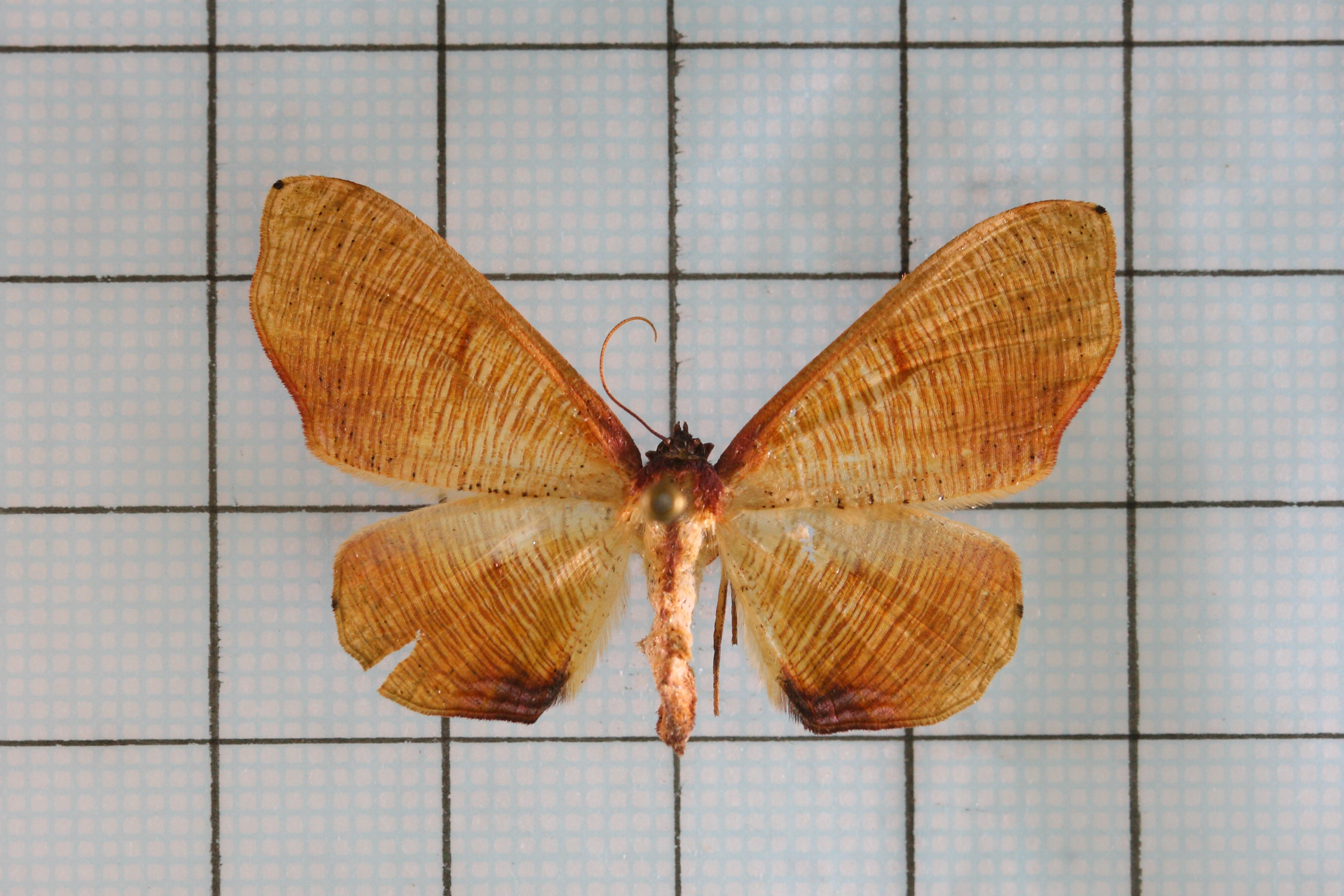

Scientific classification
- Domain: Eukaryota
- Kingdom: Animalia
- Phylum: Arthropoda
- Class: Insecta
- Order: Lepidoptera
- Family: Geometridae
- Genus: Plagodis
- Species: P. reticulata

Binomial name
- Plagodis reticulata Warren, 1893

Synonyms
- Apoplagodis reticulata

= Plagodis reticulata =

Species of moth

Plagodis reticulata is a species of moth of the family Geometridae. It is found in south-east Asia, including Bhutan and Taiwan.

The wingspan is about 28 mm.
