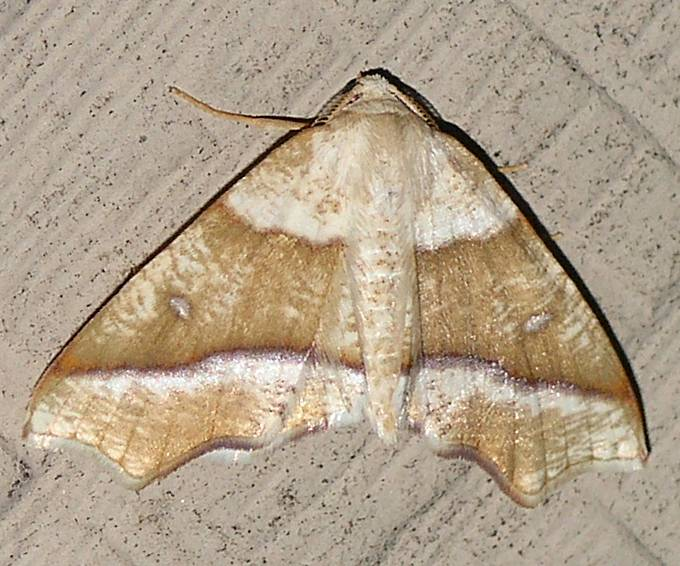

Scientific classification
- Kingdom: Animalia
- Phylum: Arthropoda
- Class: Insecta
- Order: Lepidoptera
- Family: Geometridae
- Genus: Plagodis
- Species: P. alcoolaria

Binomial name
- Plagodis alcoolaria (Guenée, 1857)

Synonyms
- Plagodis kempii Hulst, 1900 (summer form)

= Plagodis alcoolaria =

Species of moth

Plagodis alcoolaria, the hollow-spotted plagodis, is a moth of the family Geometridae. The species was first described by Achille Guenée in 1857. It is found in eastern and central North America.

The wingspan is 26–35 mm. Adults are on wing from the end of March to September.

The larvae feed on various deciduous trees, including basswood, beech, maple and oak. They prefer Betula (birch) species.

== Description ==
They have yellowish-white wings, with orangish-brown shading and lines that range in color from orange to brown black. The perimeter line curves outward and meets costa closer to apex than in other Plagodis species. They also have a large discal spot. The summer brood (P. kempii) have a paler yellow color with fewer markings than the spring brood.

== Distribution and habitat ==
They are found across North America. They are spotted from Nova Scotia to Georgia, west to Manitoba, and in South Dakota, Missouri, and Mississippi.
