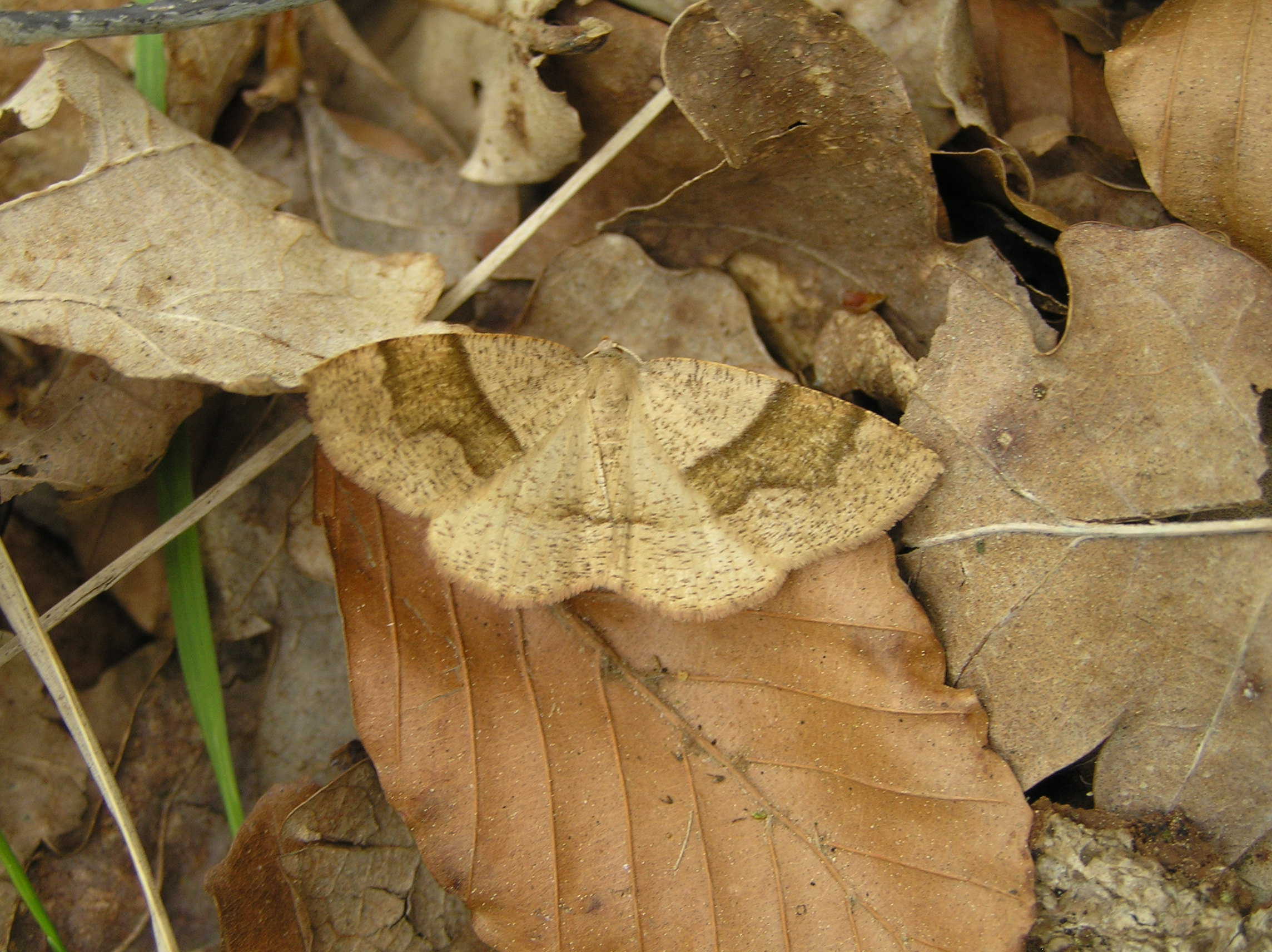

Scientific classification
- Kingdom: Animalia
- Phylum: Arthropoda
- Class: Insecta
- Order: Lepidoptera
- Family: Geometridae
- Genus: Plagodis
- Species: P. pulveraria

Binomial name
- Plagodis pulveraria (Linnaeus, 1758)

= Plagodis pulveraria =

Species of moth

Plagodis pulveraria, the barred umber, is a moth of the family Geometridae. The species was first described by Carl Linnaeus in his 1758 10th edition of Systema Naturae. It is found throughout much of the Palearctic realm from Ireland to Japan, and in the Nearctic realm (Canada).

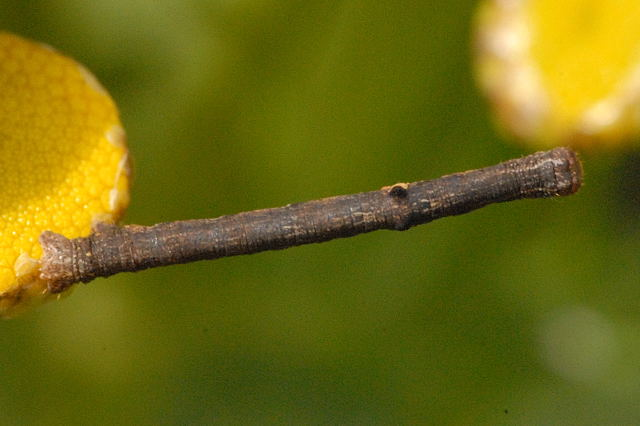

The wingspan is 28–33 mm. The length of the forewings is 17–19 mm. "Variable, but always showing more or less of a reddish tone, with no markings except the rather straight antemedian and posteriorly strongly incurved postmedian lines of the forewing. The median area in the name-typical form is darkened. — ab. passetii Th.-Mieg is violaceous grey instead of reddish brown, the median band sharply expressed. - ab. marginepurpuraria Bastelb. is deeper red, the median area of forewing and basal half of hindwing more orange-, the rest more purple-tinged, lines thick, antemedian rather curved, postmedian less broad anteriorly than in the type. Rather small and round-winged. Rheingau - ab. unicolor Hirschke has both wings uniform brown, dark-dusted, without lines or band. - gadmensis Ratzer is a rather small, brighter (yellower) brown form from Switzerland (Gadmenthal), with the median area almost or quite concolorous, the lines remaining.- violacearia Graeser (15 h), from Amurland, is a very small form, coloured nearly like marginepurpuraria, which must perhaps sink to it, but the thick lines are described as dark violet and it is not indicated that their form differs from the normal; compare, however, the following form. -japonica Btlr. is a small race, or possibly distinct species, from Japan and Korea, bright deep red-brown, the median area as broad posteriorly as anteriorly, not differentiated in colour, the lines which bound it deeper red brown, the postmedian only projecting a little in the middle. Line on hindwing continued nearly to the costal margin, straighter than in marginepurpuraria, which also shows this peculiarity."

The moth flies in two generations from mid-March to August.

The larva feeds on various deciduous trees such as oak, birch and sallow.

== Notes ==
1. The flight season refers to Belgium and the Netherlands. This may vary in other parts of the range.
