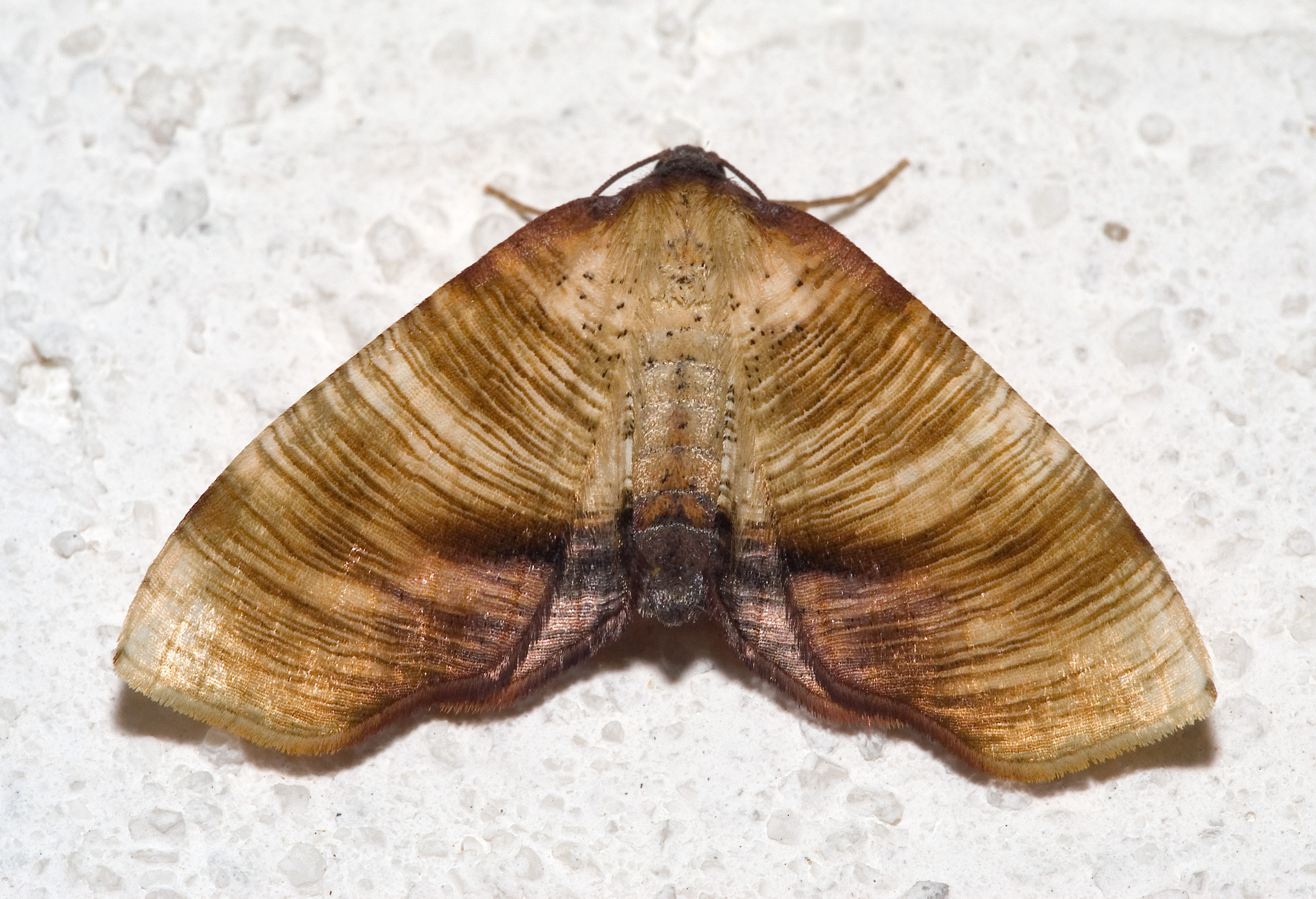

Scientific classification
- Kingdom: Animalia
- Phylum: Arthropoda
- Class: Insecta
- Order: Lepidoptera
- Family: Geometridae
- Genus: Plagodis
- Species: P. dolabraria

Binomial name
- Plagodis dolabraria (Linnaeus, 1767)

= Plagodis dolabraria =

Species of moth

Plagodis dolabraria, the scorched wing, is a moth of the family Geometridae. The species was first described by Carl Linnaeus in 1767. It is found throughout Europe and through the Palearctic, east to Transcaucasia, south east Siberia and Japan.

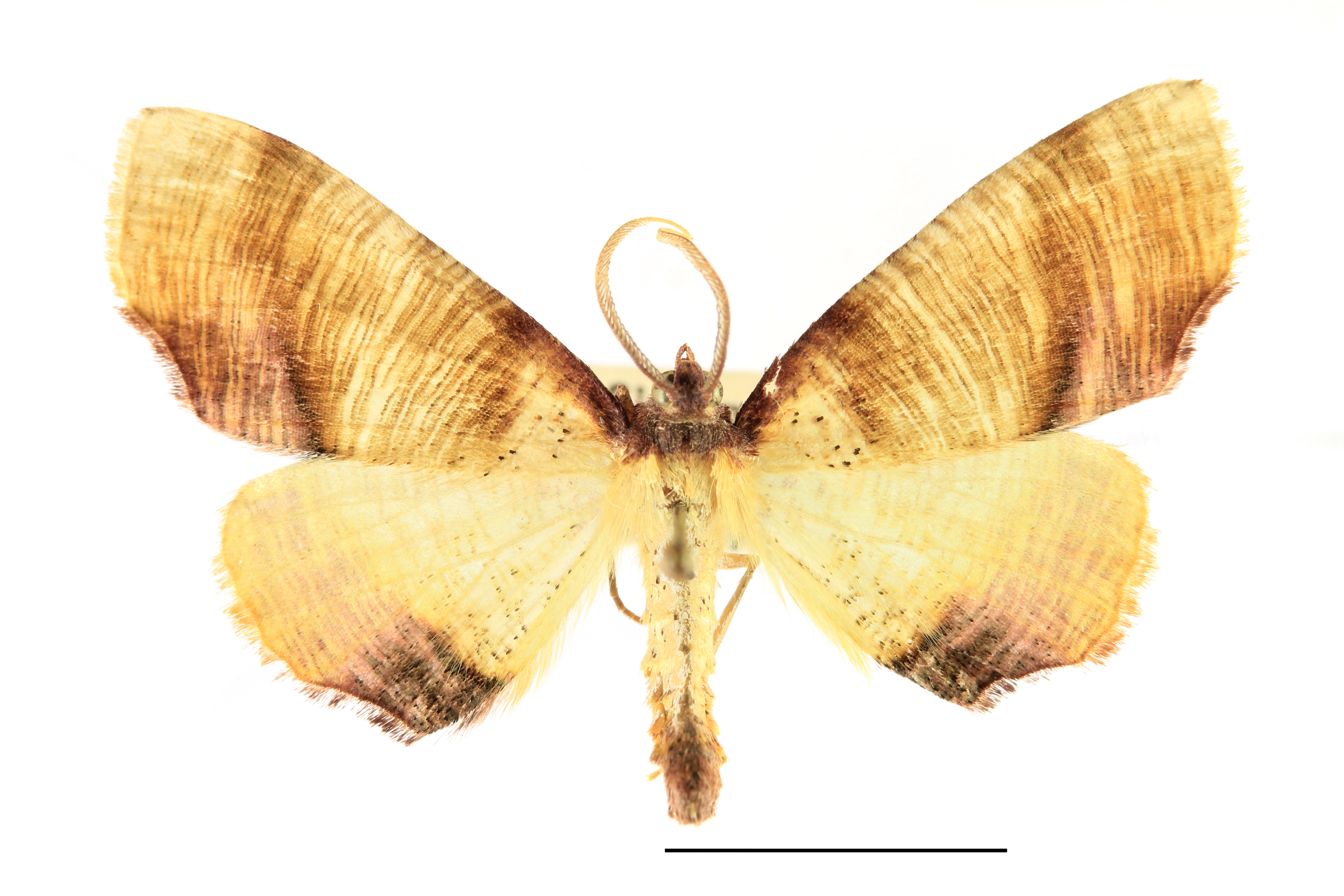

The wingspan is 28–32 mm. The length of the forewings is 16–19 mm. Forewing with innumerable fine, slightly oblique, transverse striae, no distinct lines; the postmedian on both wings indicated by a thick dark fuscous shade posteriorly, distally to which (especially on hindwing) there is an ill-defined purplish blotch reaching to the hinder angle. Ab. atrox Zerny is a melanotic form, forewing mostly dark chestnut brown, towards the base and hinder angle black.

The moth flies in one generation from the beginning of May to mid-July.

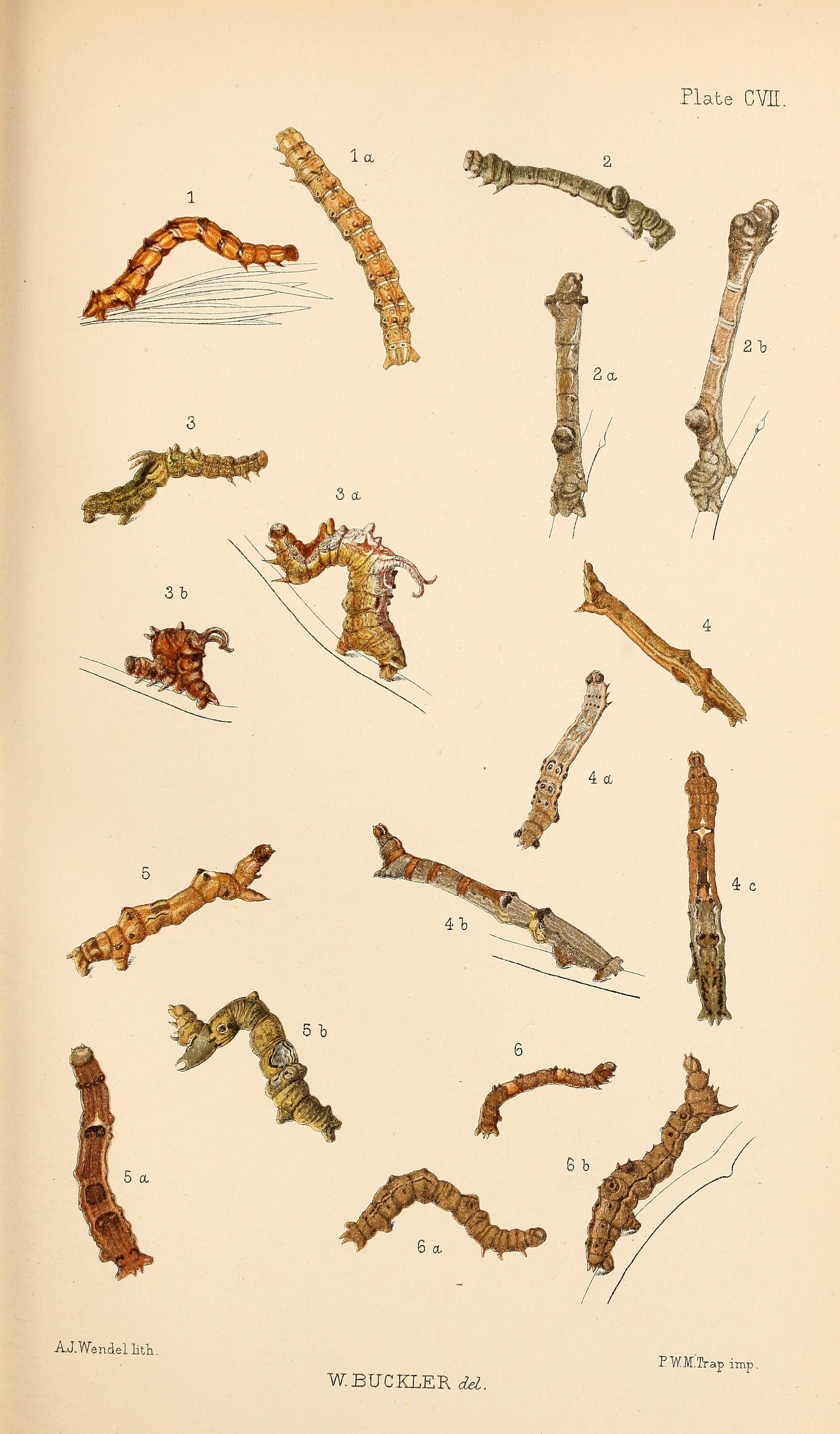
figs 2, 2a, 2b Larva growth stages

The larva is twig like, brownish and variegated. The thorax is darker dorsally, there is a hump on the 5th abdominal and a transverse mark near the tail is also dark.

The larva feeds on various deciduous trees such as oak, birch and sallow.

== Notes ==
1. The flight season refers to the Belgium and the Netherlands. This may vary in other parts of the range.
