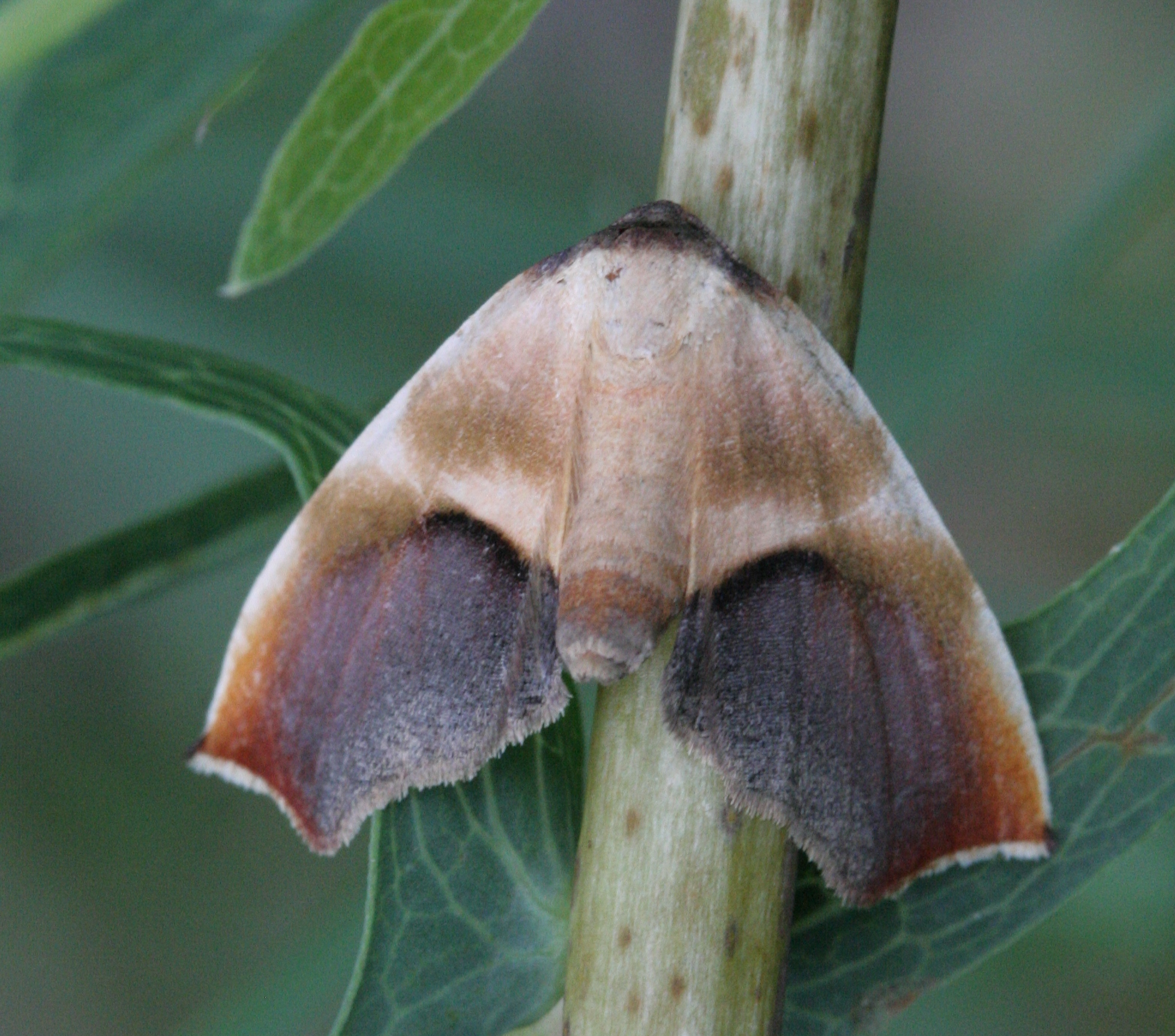

Scientific classification
- Kingdom: Animalia
- Phylum: Arthropoda
- Class: Insecta
- Order: Lepidoptera
- Family: Geometridae
- Genus: Plagodis
- Species: P. kuetzingi

Binomial name
- Plagodis kuetzingi (Grote, 1876)

= Plagodis kuetzingi =

Species of moth

Plagodis kuetzingi, the purple plagodis, is a North American moth in the family Geometridae. It is an uncommon to rare moth.

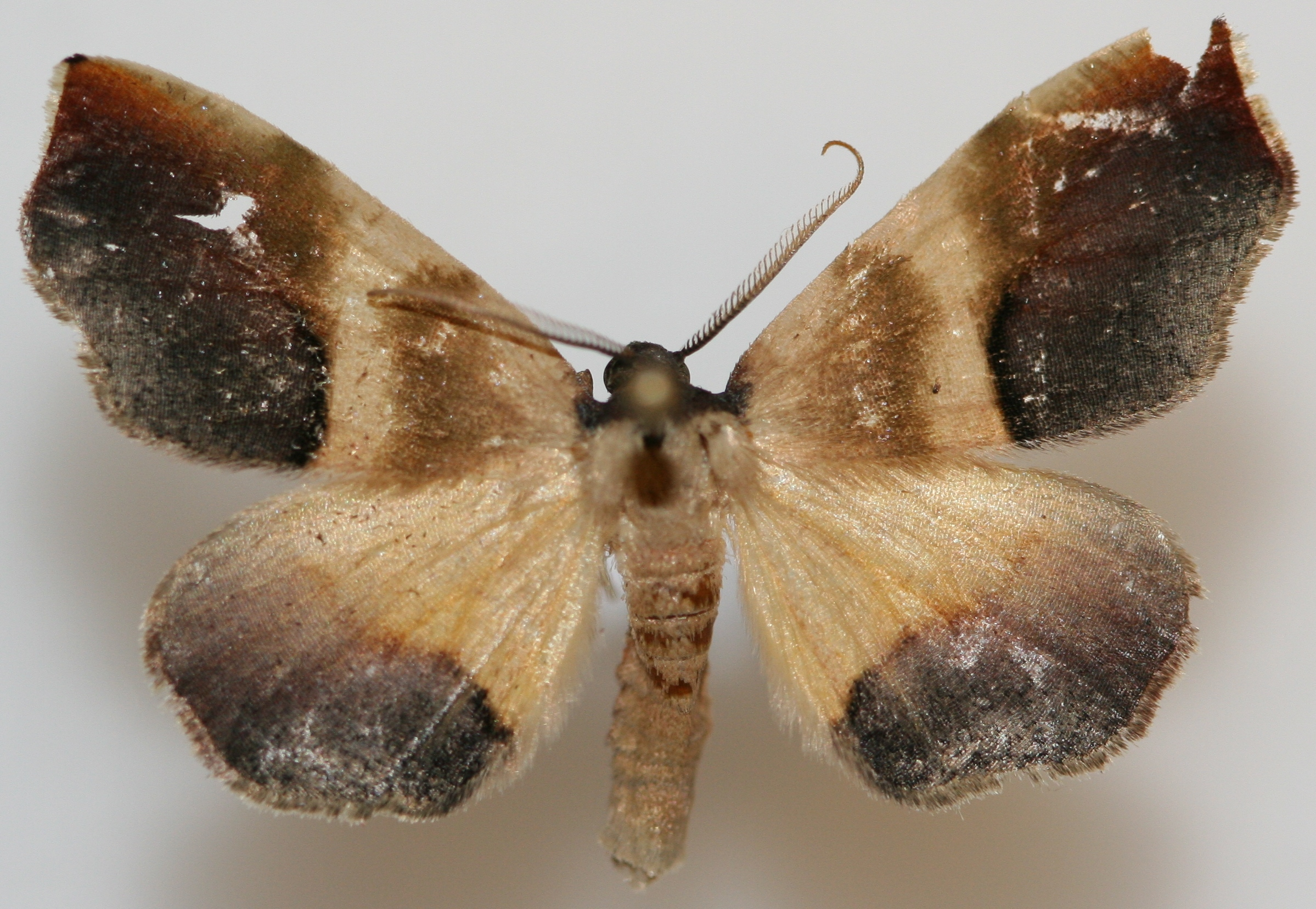
Mounted

== Distribution ==
This moth is found from Nova Scotia south to Virginia and Tennessee west to Illinois, Iowa, and Wisconsin.

== Flight ==
The purple plagodis is found from May to July.

== Host plants ==
It feeds only on ash trees (Fraxinus sp.)
