= List of moths of North America (MONA 6089–7648) =

North American moths represent approximately 12,000 types of moths, whereas there are around 825 species of North American butterflies. Moths (mostly nocturnal) and butterflies (mostly diurnal) together comprise the taxonomic order Lepidoptera.

This list is sorted by MONA number (MONA is short for Moths of America North of Mexico). The numbering system for North American moths was introduced by Ronald W. Hodges et al. in 1983 in the publication Check List of the Lepidoptera of America North of Mexico. Although the list has been updated, the placement of some species within families is outdated.

This list covers America north of Mexico (effectively the continental United States and Canada). For a list of moths and butterflies recorded from the state of Hawaii, see List of Lepidoptera of Hawaii.

This is a partial list, covering moths with MONA numbers ranging from 6089 to 7648. For the rest of the list, see List of moths of North America.

== Pterophoridae ==
- 6089 – Agdistis americana
- 6090 – Sphenarches ontario
- 6090.1 – Sphenarches anisodactylus
- 6090.2 – Leptodeuterocopus neales
- 6091 – Geina periscelidactylus, grape plume moth
- 6091.1 – Geina sheppardi, Sheppard's plume moth
- 6092 – Geina tenuidactyla, Himmelman's plume moth
- 6093 – Geina buscki
- 6094 – Capperia ningoris
- 6095 – Capperia evansi
- 6096 – Capperia raptor
- 6097 – Oxyptilus delawaricus
- 6098 – Buckleria parvulus, sundew plume moth
- 6099 – Trichoptilus potentellus
- 6099.1 – Exelastis pumilio
- 6099.2 – Exelastis rhynchosiae
- 6099.3 – Exelastis montischristi
- 6100 – Dejongia californicus
- 6101 – Trichoptilus pygmaeus
- 6102 – Dejongia lobidactylus
- 6103 – Michaelophorus indentatus
- 6104 – Megalorhipida leucodactylus
- 6105 – Cnaemidophorus rhododactyla, rose plume moth
- 6106 – Platyptilia tesseradactyla
- 6107 – Gillmeria pallidactyla
- 6108 – Platyptilia johnstoni
- 6109 – Platyptilia carduidactylus, artichoke plume moth
- 6110 – Platyptilia percnodactylus
- 6111 – Platyptilia comstocki
- 6112 – Platyptilia williamsii
- 6113 – Platyptilia ardua
- 6114 – Platyptilia washburnensis
- 6115 – Platyptilia albicans
- 6116 – Gillmeria albertae
- 6117 – Anstenoptilia marmarodactyla
- 6118 – Amblyptilia pica, geranium plume moth
- 6119 – Lantanophaga pusillidactylus, lantana plume moth
- 6120 – Lioptilodes albistriolatus
- 6121.1 – Stenoptilodes taprobanes
- 6122 – Stenoptilodes brevipennis
- 6123 – Stenoptilodes antirrhina
- 6124 – Paraplatyptilia grandis
- 6125 – Paraplatyptilia carolina
- 6125.1 – Paraplatyptliia atlantica
- 6126 – Paraplatyptilia immaculata
- 6127 – Paraplatyptilia auriga
- 6127.1 – Paraplatyptilia albui
- 6127.2 – Paraplatyptilia glacialis
- 6127.3 – Paraplatyptilia sabourini
- 6127.4 – Paraplatyptilia watkinsi
- 6128 – Paraplatyptilia edwardsii
- 6129 – Paraplatyptilia baueri
- 6130 – Paraplatyptilia albiciliatus
- 6131 – Paraplatyptilia lutescens
- 6132 – Paraplatyptilia albidus
- 6133 – Paraplatyptilia shastae
- 6134 – Paraplatyptilia nana
- 6135 – Paraplatyptilia albidorsellus
- 6136 – Paraplatyptilia fragilis
- 6137 – Paraplatyptilia maea
- 6138 – Paraplatyptilia cooleyi
- 6139 – Paraplatyptilia xylopsamma
- 6140 – Paraplatyptilia modestus
- 6141 – Paraplatyptilia bifida
- 6142 – Paraplatyptilia petrodactylus
- 6143 – Stenoptilia pterodactyla
- 6144 – Stenoptilia zophodactylus
- 6145 – Stenoptilia pallistriga
- 6146 – Stenoptilia mengeli
- 6147 – Amblyptilia bowmani
- 6148 – Stenoptilia exclamationis
- 6149 – Stenoptilia coloradensis
- 6150 – Stenoptilia columbia
- 6151 – Stenoptilia grandipuncta
- 6153 – Singularia walsinghami
- 6154 – Pselnophorus belfragei, Belfrage's plume moth
- no number yet – Pselnophorus chihuahuaensis
- no number yet – Pselnophorus hodgesi
- no number yet – Pselnophorus kutisi
- 6155 – Adaina bipunctatus
- 6155.1 – Adaina simplicius
- No number yet – Adaina primulacea
- 6156 – Adaina zephyria
- 6156.1 – Adaina thomae
- 6156.2 – Adaina perplexus
- 6157 – Adaina montanus
- 6158 – Adaina cinerascens
- 6159 – Emmelina buscki
- 6160 – Adaina ambrosiae, ambrosia plume moth
- 6161 – Oidaematophorus occidentalis
- 6162 – Oidaematophorus balsamorrhizae
- 6163 – Oidaematophorus cretidactylus
- 6164 – Oidaematophorus downesi
- 6165 – Oidaematophorus guttatus
- 6166 – Oidaematophorus mathewianus
- 6167 – Hellinsia fishii
- 6168 – Oidaematophorus eupatorii, eupatorium plume moth
- 6169 – Oidaematophorus rogenhoferi
- 6170 – Oidaematophorus phaceliae
- 6171 – Oidaematophorus grisescens
- 6172 – Oidaematophorus cineraceus
- 6173 – Oidaematophorus rileyi
- 6174 – Oidaematophorus lindseyi
- 6175 – Oidaematophorus baroni
- 6176 – Oidaematophorus castor
- No number yet – Hellinsia habecki
- 6177 – Hellinsia pollux
- 6178 – Hellinsia mizar
- 6179 – Hellinsia meyricki
- 6180 – Hellinsia gratiosus
- 6181 – Hellinsia fieldi
- 6182 – Hellinsia confusus
- 6183 – Hellinsia citrites
- 6184 – Hellinsia brucei
- 6185 – Hellinsia albilobata
- 6186 – Hellinsia inquinatus
- 6187 – Hellinsia eros
- 6188 – Hellinsia pan
- 6189 – Hellinsia phoebus
- 6190 – Hellinsia thor
- 6191 – Hellinsia triton
- 6192 – Hellinsia integratus
- 6193 – Hellinsia auster
- 6194 – Hellinsia medius
- 6195 – Hellinsia linus
- 6196 – Hellinsia cadmus
- 6197 – Hellinsia iobates
- 6198 – Hellinsia cochise
- 6199 – Hellinsia ares
- 6200 – Hellinsia tinctus
- 6201 – Hellinsia thoracica
- 6202 – Hellinsia helianthi
- 6203 – Hellinsia homodactylus
- 6204 – Hellinsia elliottii
- 6206 – Hellinsia pectodactylus
- 6207 – Hellinsia paleaceus
- 6208 – Hellinsia venapunctus
- 6209 – Hellinsia luteolus
- 6210 – Hellinsia balanotes, baccharis borer plume moth
- 6211 – Hellinsia grandis, coyote brush borer plume moth
- 6212 – Hellinsia kellicottii, goldenrod borer plume moth
- 6212.1 – Hellinsia chlorias
- 6213 – Hellinsia lacteodactylus
- 6214 – Hellinsia glenni
- 6215 – Hellinsia subochraceus
- 6216 – Hellinsia sulphureodactylus
- 6217 – Hellinsia serenus
- 6218 – Hellinsia australis
- 6219 – Hellinsia costatus
- 6220 – Hellinsia falsus
- 6221 – Hellinsia varius
- 6222 – Hellinsia varioides
- 6223 – Hellinsia corvus
- 6224 – Hellinsia perditus
- 6225 – Hellinsia simplicissimus
- 6226 – Hellinsia unicolor
- 6227 – Hellinsia inconditus
- 6228 – Hellinsia caudelli
- 6229 – Hellinsia rigidus
- 6230 – Hellinsia contortus
- 6231 – Hellinsia catalinae
- 6232 – Hellinsia arion
- 6233 – Hellinsia longifrons
- 6234 – Emmelina monodactyla, morning-glory plume moth

== Drepanoidea ==
- 6235 – Habrosyne scripta, lettered habrosyne moth
- 6236 – Habrosyne gloriosa, glorious habrosyne moth
- 6237 – Pseudothyatira cymatophoroides, tufted thyatirid moth
- 6238 – Thyatira mexicana
- 6239 – Thyatira lorata
- 6240 – Euthyatira pudens, dogwood thyatirid moth
- 6241 – Euthyatira semicircularis
- 6242 – Ceranemota improvisa
- 6243 – Ceranemota fasciata
- 6244 – Ceranemota crumbi
- 6245 – Ceranemota semifasciata
- 6246 – Ceranemota tearlei
- 6248 – Ceranemota albertae, Alberta lutestring moth
- no number – Ceranemota partida
- no number – Ceranemota amplifascia
- 6250 – Bycombia verdugoensis
- 6251 – Drepana arcuata, arched hooktip moth
- 6252 – Drepana bilineata, two-lined hooktip moth
- 6253 – Eudeilinia herminiata, northern eudeilinea moth
- 6255 – Oreta rosea, rose hooktip moth

== Geometridae ==
- 6256 E – Archiearis infans, infant moth
- 6256.1 E – Boudinotiana hodeberti
- 6257 E – Leucobrephos brephoides, scarce infant moth
- 6258 E – Alsophila pometaria, fall cankerworm moth
- 6259 E – Ametris nitocris, seagrape spanworm moth
- 6260 E – Almodes terraria
- 6261 E – Heliomata cycladata, common spring moth
- 6261.1 E – Heliomata scintillata
- 6263 E – Heliomata infulata, rare spring moth
- 6266 W – Protitame subalbaria
- 6270 B – Protitame virginalis, virgin moth
- 6271.1 E – Mellilla xanthometata, orangewing moth
- 6272 E – Eumacaria madopata, brown-bordered geometer moth
- 6273 E – Speranza pustularia, lesser maple spanworm moth
- 6274 E – Speranza ribearia, currant spanworm moth
- 6276 W – Speranza flavicaria
- 6277 W – Speranza helena
- 6278 E – Speranza evagaria, drab angle moth
- 6279 E – Speranza occiduaria
- 6280 E – Speranza andersoni
- 6281 W – Speranza simplex
- 6282 E – Speranza argillacearia, mousy angle moth
- 6283 B – Speranza sulphurea, sulphur angle moth
- 6284 W – Speranza amboflava
- 6285 E – Speranza inextricata
- 6285.1 E – Speranza exonerata
- 6286 E – Speranza brunneata
- 6287 E – Speranza anataria
- 6287.1 B – Speranza boreata
- 6288 W – Speranza quadrilinearia
- 6289 W – Speranza coloradensis
- 6290 E – Speranza loricaria
- 6291 W – Speranza semivolata
- 6292 E – Speranza exauspicata
- 6293 W – Speranza umbriferata
- 6294 E – Speranza abruptata
- 6295 W – Speranza confederata
- 6296 W – Speranza plumosata
- 6298 W – Speranza extemporata
- 6299 E – Speranza coortaria, four-spotted angle moth
- 6299.1 W – Speranza hesperata
- 6299.2 W – Speranza prunosata
- 6300 W – Speranza perornata
- 6301 W – Speranza guenearia
- 6301.1 W – Speranza austrinata
- 6302 W – Speranza trilinearia
- 6303 E – Speranza subcessaria, barred angle moth
- 6304 E – Speranza bitactata, split-lined angle moth
- 6304.1 E – Speranza wauaria
- 6305 W – Speranza denticulodes
- 6306 W – Speranza decorata
- 6308 W – Speranza colata
- 6309 W – Speranza benigna
- 6310 W – Speranza schatzeata
- 6311 W – Speranza graphidaria
- 6312 W – Speranza deceptrix
- 6314 E – Speranza varadaria, southern angle moth
- 6315 W – Speranza grossbecki
- 6315.1 W – Speranza saphenata
- 6316 W – Speranza simpliciata
- 6317 W – Speranza pallipennata
- 6321 B – Epelis truncataria, black-banded orange moth
- 6323 W – Speranza marcescaria
- 6324 W – Speranza lorquinaria, Lorquin's angle moth
- 6325 W – Letispe metanemaria
- 6326 B – Macaria aemulataria, common angle moth
- 6326.1 W – Macaria juglandata
- 6328.1 W – Psamatodes atrimacularia
- 6328.2 E – Psamatodes rectilineata
- 6330 E – Macaria notata, birch angle moth
- 6331 E – Macaria promiscuata, promiscuous angle moth
- 6332 W – Psamatodes abydata, dot-lined angle moth
- 6332.1 E – Psamatodes trientata
- 6333 W – Psamatodes everiata
- 6334 E – Macaria carpo
- 6335 E – Macaria aequiferaria, woody angle moth
- 6336 E – Macaria distribuaria, southern chocolate angle moth
- 6337 E – Macaria sanfordi
- 6338 W – Macaria adonis
- 6338.1 W – Macaria ponderosae
- 6339 E – Macaria transitaria, blurry chocolate angle moth
- 6340 E – Macaria minorata, minor angle moth
- 6341 B – Macaria bicolorata, bicolored angle moth
- 6342 B – Macaria bisignata, red-headed inchworm moth
- 6342.1 B – Macaria masquerata
- 6343 E – Macaria sexmaculata, six-spotted angle moth
- 6344 E – Macaria signaria, pale-marked angle moth
- 6346 W – Macaria unipunctaria
- 6347 E – Macaria pinistrobata, white pine angle moth
- 6348 E – Macaria fissinotata, hemlock angle moth
- 6349 E – Macaria marmorata
- 6350 E – Macaria submarmorata
- 6351 E – Macaria oweni
- 6352 E – Macaria granitata, granite moth
- 6353 E – Macaria multilineata, many-lined angle moth
- 6354 W – Psamatodes pallidata
- 6355 W – Digrammia sublacteolata
- 6357 E – Digrammia eremiata, three-lined angle moth
- 6357.1 E – Digrammia equivocata
- 6358 E – Digrammia ordinata
- 6359 W – Taeniogramma quadrilinea
- 6360 E – Trigrammia quadrinotaria, four-spotted angle moth
- 6362 B – Digrammia continuata, curve-lined angle moth
- 6363 W – Digrammia excurvata
- 6363.1 W – Digrammia pallorata
- 6363.2 W – Digrammia cinereola
- 6364 W – Digrammia setonana
- 6365 W – Digrammia pertinata
- 6366 W – Digrammia napensis
- 6366.1 W – Digrammia imparilata
- 6368 W – Digrammia atrofasciata
- 6368.1 W – Digrammia modocata
- 6370 B – Digrammia curvata
- 6371 W – Digrammia nubiculata
- 6371.1 W – Digrammia palodurata
- 6372 W – Digrammia pictipennata
- 6372.1 W – Digrammia terramalata
- 6373 B – Digrammia denticulata
- 6374 W – Digrammia delectata
- 6374.1 W – Digrammia ubiquitata
- 6376 W – Digrammia burneyata
- 6377 W – Digrammia muscariata
- 6377.1 W – Digrammia extenuata
- 6380 W – Digrammia californiaria, Californian granite moth
- 6381 W – Digrammia colorata, creosote moth
- 6383 W – Digrammia pervolata
- 6385 W – Digrammia triviata
- 6386 E – Digrammia ocellinata, faint-spotted angle moth
- 6387 W – Digrammia aliceata
- 6387.1 W – Digrammia sexpunctata, six-spotted digrammia moth
- 6389 B – Digrammia decorata, decorated granite moth
- 6389.1 W – Digrammia plemmelata
- 6391 B – Digrammia spinata
- 6392 W – Digrammia indeterminata
- 6393 W – Digrammia yavapai
- 6394 B – Digrammia rippertaria
- 6394.1 W – Digrammia hebetata
- 6395 W – Digrammia irrorata
- 6396 B – Digrammia neptaria, dark-bordered granite moth
- 6397 E – Digrammia mellistrigata, yellow-lined angle moth
- 6399 B – Digrammia subminiata
- 6400 W – Digrammia gilletteata
- 6402 W – Digrammia fieldi
- 6403 W – Digrammia minuta
- 6404 W – Digrammia puertata
- 6405 E – Digrammia gnophosaria, hollow-spotted angle moth
- 6406 W – Rindgea parcata
- 6406.1 E – Rindgea disparcata
- 6407 W – Rindgea nigricomma
- 6408 W – Rindgea piccoloi
- 6409 E – Rindgea stipularia
- 6409.1 B – Rindgea prolificata
- 6410 E – Digrammia pallidata
- 6411 W – Rindgea maricopa
- 6412 W – Rindgea flaviterminata
- 6413 B – Rindgea subterminata
- 6414 W – Rindgea s-signata, signate looper moth
- 6415 W – Rindgea cyda, mesquite looper moth
- 6416 W – Rindgea ballandrata
- 6417 W – Rindgea hypaethrata
- 6419 E – Isturgia dislocaria, pale-veined isturgia moth
- 6420 W – Fernaldella fimetaria, green broomweed looper moth
- 6420.1 E – Fernaldella georgiana
- 6421 W – Fernaldella stalachtaria
- 6422 W – Protitame cervula
- 6423 W – Taeniogramma octolineata
- 6424 W – Taeniogramma mendicata
- 6425 W – Taeniogramma tenebrosata
- 6426 W – Dasyfidonia avuncularia, red-winged wave moth
- 6427 W – Dasyfidonia macdunnoughi
- 6428 E – Orthofidonia tinctaria
- 6429 E – Orthofidonia exornata
- 6430 E – Orthofidonia flavivenata, yellow-veined geometer moth
- 6431 E – Hesperumia sulphuraria, sulphur moth
- 6432 W – Hesperumia fumosaria
- 6433 W – Hesperumia latipennis
- 6434 W – Hesperumia fumida
- 6435 W – Neoalcis californiaria, brown-lined looper moth
- 6436 E – Ematurga amitaria, cranberry spanworm moth
- 6437 E – Hypomecis luridula
- 6438 E – Hypomecis buchholzaria
- 6439 E – Hypomecis umbrosaria, umber moth
- 6439.1 E – Hypomecis longipectinaria
- 6440 E – Hypomecis gnopharia
- 6441 W – Pimaphera percata
- 6442 E – Pimaphera sparsaria
- 6443 E – Glenoides texanaria, Texas gray moth
- 6444 E – Glenoides lenticuligera
- 6445 W – Glena grisearia
- 6446 W – Glena furfuraria
- 6447 W – Glena arcana
- 6448 W – Glena nigricaria
- 6449 E – Glena cribrataria, dotted gray moth
- 6450 B – Glena cognataria, blueberry gray moth
- 6450.1 – Glaucina incognitaria
- 6451 W – Glena interpunctata
- 6452 B – Glena plumosaria, dainty gray moth
- 6453 W – Glena quinquelinearia, five-lined gray moth
- 6454 W – Glena macdunnougharia
- 6455 W – Stenoporpia pulchella
- 6456 W – Stenoporpia margueritae
- 6457 W – Stenoporpia asymmetra
- 6458 W – Stenoporpia dionaria
- 6459 B – Stenoporpia polygrammaria
- 6460 W – Stenoporpia mediatra
- 6461 W – Stenoporpia dissonaria
- 6462 W – Stenoporpia anastomosaria
- 6463 B – Stenoporpia pulmonaria
- 6464 W – Stenoporpia purpuraria
- 6465 W – Stenoporpia vernata
- 6466 W – Stenoporpia vernalella
- 6467 W – Stenoporpia insipidaria
- 6468 W – Stenoporpia anellula
- 6469 W – Stenoporpia badia
- 6470 W – Stenoporpia macdunnoughi
- 6471 W – Stenoporpia blanchardi
- 6472 W – Stenoporpia glaucomarginaria
- 6473 B – Stenoporpia separataria
- 6474 B – Stenoporpia excelsaria
- 6475 W – Stenoporpia larga
- 6476 W – Stenoporpia graciella
- 6477 W – Stenoporpia lea
- 6478 E – Exelis pyrolaria, fine-lined gray moth
- 6479 E – Exelis dicolus
- 6480 B – Exelis ophiurus
- 6481 B – Tornos punctata
- 6482 B – Tornos hoffmanni
- 6483 W – Tornos benjamini
- 6484 W – Tornos erectarius
- 6485 E – Tornos cinctarius
- 6486 E – Tornos scolopacinaria, dimorphic gray moth
- 6487 E – Tornos abjectarius
- 6488 W – Glaucina erroraria
- 6489 W – Glaucina biartata
- 6490 W – Glaucina utahensis
- 6491 W – Glaucina cilla
- 6492 W – Glaucina macdunnoughi
- 6493 W – Glaucina epiphysaria
- 6494 W – Glaucina baea
- 6495 W – Glaucina escaria
- 6496 W – Glaucina eupetheciaria
- 6496.1 W – Glaucina lucida
- 6497 W – Glaucina elongata
- 6498 W – Glaucina golgolata
- 6499 W – Glaucina magnifica
- 6500 W – Glaucina ampla
- 6501 W – Glaucina bifida
- 6502 W – Glaucina interruptaria
- 6503 W – Glaucina spaldingata
- 6504 W – Glaucina gonia
- 6505 W – Glaucina platia
- 6506 W – Glaucina nephos
- 6507 W – Glaucina infumataria
- 6508 W – Glaucina ignavaria
- 6509 W – Glaucina lowensis
- 6510 W – Glaucina dispersa
- 6511 W – Glaucina denticularia
- 6512 W – Glaucina imperdata
- 6513 W – Glaucina mayelisaria
- 6514 W – Glaucina nota
- 6515 W – Glaucina eureka
- 6515.1 W – Glaucina agnesae
- 6516 W – Glaucina ochrofuscaria
- 6517 W – Glaucina loxa
- 6518 W – Glaucina anomala
- 6519 W – Synglochis perumbraria
- 6520 W – Eubarnesia ritaria
- 6521 W – Paraglaucina hulstinoides
- 6522 B – Nepterotaea diagonalis
- 6523 W – Nepterotaea marjorae
- 6524 E – Nepterotaea ozarkensis
- 6525 W – Nepterotaea dorotheata
- 6526 – Nepterotaea furva
- 6527 W – Nepterotaea memoriata
- 6528 W – Nepterotaea obliviscata
- 6529 W – Chesiadodes simularia
- 6530 W – Chesiadodes cinerea
- 6531 W – Chesiadodes morosata
- 6532 W – Chesiadodes tubercula
- 6533 W – Chesiadodes polingi
- 6534 W – Chesiadodes bicolor
- 6535 W – Chesiadodes coniferaria
- 6536 W – Chesiadodes fusca
- 6537 W – Chesiadodes curvata
- 6538 W – Chesiadodes longa
- 6539 W – Chesiadodes dissimilis
- 6540 W – Hulstina formosata
- 6541 W – Hulstina imitatrix
- 6542 W – Hulstina tanycraeros
- 6543 W – Hulstina aridata
- 6544 W – Hulstina xera
- 6545 W – Hulstina grossbecki
- 6546 W – Hulstina exhumata
- 6547 W – Hulstina wrightiaria, Wright's hulstina moth
- 6548 W – Pterotaea crickmeri
- 6549 W – Pterotaea crinigera
- 6549.1 – Pterotaea depromaria
- 6550 W – Pterotaea sperryae
- 6551 W – Pterotaea leuschneri
- 6552 W – Pterotaea plagia
- 6553 W – Pterotaea lamiaria
- 6554 W – Pterotaea campestraria
- 6555 W – Pterotaea succurva
- 6556 W – Pterotaea glauca
- 6557 W – Pterotaea cavea
- 6558 W – Pterotaea miscella
- 6559 W – Pterotaea systole
- 6560 W – Pterotaea euroa
- 6561 W – Pterotaea lira
- 6562 W – Pterotaea obscura
- 6563 W – Pterotaea comstocki
- 6564 W – Pterotaea macrocercos
- 6565 W – Pterotaea powelli
- 6566 W – Pterotaea albescens
- 6567 W – Pterotaea melanocarpa
- 6568 W – Pterotaea cariosa
- 6569 W – Pterotaea newcombi
- 6570 E – Aethalura intertexta, four-barred gray moth
- 6571 E – Iridopsis cypressaria
- 6572 W – Iridopsis jacumbaria
- 6573 W – Iridopsis dataria
- 6574 W – Iridopsis angulata
- 6575 W – Iridopsis clivinaria, mountain mahogany looper moth
- 6575.1 W – Iridopsis profanata
- 6576 W – Iridopsis sanctissima
- 6577 W – Iridopsis obliquaria, oblique looper moth
- 6578 W – Iridopsis providentia
- 6579 W – Iridopsis sancta
- 6580 E – Iridopsis pergracilis, cypress looper moth
- 6581 B – Iridopsis perfectaria
- 6582 E – Iridopsis vellivolata, large purplish gray moth
- 6583 E – Iridopsis ephyraria, pale-winged gray moth
- 6584 E – Iridopsis humaria, small purplish gray moth
- 6585 W – Iridopsis fragilaria
- 6586 E – Iridopsis defectaria, brown-shaded gray moth
- 6587 – Iridopsis gemella
- 6587.1 – Iridopsis pseudoherse
- 6588 E – Iridopsis larvaria, bent-line gray moth
- 6589 W – Iridopsis emasculatum
- 6590 B – Anavitrinella pampinaria, common gray moth
- 6591 W – Anavitrinella atristrigaria, Gulf Coast gray moth
- 6592 W – Anavitrinella addendaria
- 6593 W – Anavitrinella ocularia
- 6594 E – Cleora sublunaria, double-lined gray moth
- 6595 E – Cleora projecta, projecta gray moth
- 6596 W – Gnophos macguffini
- 6597 E – Ectropis crepuscularia, small engrailed moth
- 6598 E – Protoboarmia porcelaria, porcelain gray moth
- 6599 E – Epimecis hortaria, tulip-tree beauty moth
- 6600 E – Epimecis subaustralis
- 6601 E – Epimecis matronaria
- 6602 E – Epimecis anonaria
- 6603 E – Epimecis fraternaria
- 6604 E – Epimecis detexta, avocado spanworm moth
- 6605 W – Mericisca gracea
- 6606 W – Mericisca perpictaria
- 6607 W – Mericisca scobina
- 6608 W – Parapheromia cassinoi
- 6609 W – Parapheromia lichenaria
- 6610 – Parapheromia ficta
- 6611 W – Parapheromia configurata
- 6612 W – Parapheromia falsata
- 6613 W – Prionomelia spododea
- 6614 W – Prionomelia ceraea
- 6615 W – Tracheops bolteri
- 6616 E – Melanochroia chephise, white-tipped black moth
- 6617 E – Melanochroia geometroides
- 6618 W – Melanolophia imitata, western carpet moth
- 6619 W – Melanolophia centralis
- 6620 E – Melanolophia canadaria, Canadian melanolophia moth
- 6621 E – Melanolophia signataria, signate melanolophia moth
- 6622 E – Melanolophia imperfectaria
- 6623 W – Carphoides setigera, green carphoides moth
- 6624 W – Carphoides incopriarius
- 6625 W – Carphoides inconspicuaria
- 6626 W – Antiphoides errantaria
- 6627 W – Galenara consimilis
- 6628 W – Galenara lallata
- 6629 W – Galenara glaucaria
- 6630 W – Galenara lixaria
- 6631 W – Galenara lixarioides
- 6632 W – Galenara stenomacra
- 6633 W – Galenara olivacea
- 6634 W – Vinemina perdita
- 6635 W – Vinemina opacaria
- 6636 W – Vinemina catalina
- 6637 E – Eufidonia convergaria
- 6638 E – Eufidonia notataria, powder moth
- 6639 E – Eufidonia discospilata, sharp-lined powder moth
- 6639.1 W – Astalotesia bucurvata
- 6640 B – Biston betularia, peppered moth
- 6641 W – Biston multidentata
- 6642 W – Cochisea rigidaria
- 6643 – Cochisea barnesi
- 6644 W – Cochisea undulata
- 6645 W – Cochisea paula
- 6646 W – Cochisea unicoloris
- 6647 W – Cochisea sonomensis
- 6648 W – Cochisea recisa
- 6649 W – Cochisea curva
- 6650 W – Cochisea sinuaria
- 6651 B – Lycia ursaria, stout spanworm moth
- 6652 E – Lycia ypsilon, woolly gray moth
- 6653 B – Lycia rachelae, twilight moth
- 6654 E – Hypagyrtis unipunctata, one-spotted variant moth
- 6655 E – Hypagyrtis esther, Esther moth
- 6656 E – Hypagyrtis piniata, pine measuringworm moth
- 6657 E – Hypagyrtis brendae, Brenda's hypagyrtis moth
- 6658 E – Phigalia titea, half-wing moth
- 6659 E – Phigalia denticulata, toothed phigalia moth
- 6660 E – Phigalia strigataria, small phigalia moth
- 6661 W – Phigalia plumogeraria, walnut spanworm moth
- 6662 B – Paleacrita vernata, spring cankerworm moth
- 6663 B – Paleacrita merriccata, white-spotted cankerworm moth
- 6664 W – Paleacrita longiciliata
- 6665 B – Erannis tiliaria, linden looper moth
- 6665.1 W – Erannis vancouverensis
- 6666 B – Lomographa semiclarata, bluish spring moth
- 6667 E – Lomographa vestaliata, white spring moth
- 6668 E – Lomographa glomeraria, gray spring moth
- 6669 W – Lomographa elsinora
- 6669.1 – Molybdogompha polymygmata
- 6670 E – Phrygionis auriferaria, golden-winged palyas moth
- 6671 E – Phrygionis paradoxata, jeweled satyr moth
- 6671.2 – Phrygionis privignaria
- 6672 W – Sericosema juturnaria, bordered fawn moth
- 6673 W – Sericosema immaculata
- 6674 W – Sericosema wilsonensis
- 6675 W – Sericosema simularia
- 6676 B – Cabera exanthemata
- 6677 E – Cabera erythemaria, yellow-dusted cream moth
- 6678 E – Cabera variolaria, vestal moth
- 6679 E – Cabera borealis
- 6680 E – Cabera quadrifasciaria, four-lined cabera moth
- 6681 W – Eudrepanulatrix rectifascia
- 6682 W – Drepanulatrix unicalcararia, spurred wave moth
- 6683 W – Drepanulatrix hulstii
- 6684 W – Drepanulatrix bifilata
- 6685 W – Drepanulatrix quadraria
- 6686 W – Drepanulatrix foeminaria
- 6686.1 W – Drepanulatrix garneri
- 6687 W – Drepanulatrix nevadaria
- 6688 W – Drepanulatrix carnearia
- 6689 W – Drepanulatrix falcataria
- 6690 W – Drepanulatrix secundaria
- 6691 W – Drepanulatrix baueraria
- 6692 W – Drepanulatrix monicaria
- 6693 E – Apodrepanulatrix liberaria
- 6694 W – Apodrepanulatrix litaria
- 6695 W – Ixala desperaria
- 6696 W – Ixala proutearia
- 6697 W – Ixala klotsi
- 6698 W – Ixala adventaria
- 6699 E – Numia terebintharia
- 6700 W – Chloraspilates bicoloraria, bicolored chloraspilates moth
- 6701 W – Chloraspilates minima
- 6702 E – Erastria decrepitaria
- 6703 W – Erastria viridirufaria
- 6704 E – Erastria coloraria, broad-lined erastria moth
- 6705 E – Erastria cruentaria, thin-lined erastria moth
- 6706 W – Pterospoda nigrescens
- 6707 W – Pterospoda opuscularia
- 6708 W – Pterospoda kunzei
- 6709 W – Stergamataea inornata
- 6710 W – Stergamataea delicatum
- 6711 E – Ilecta intractata, black-dotted ruddy moth
- 6712 E – Thysanopyga proditata
- 6713 E – Episemasia solitaria
- 6714 B – Episemasia cervinaria
- 6715 B – Aspitates aberrata
- 6716 E – Aspitates forbesi
- 6716.1 – Aspitates ochrearia
- 6717 E – Aspitates orciferaria
- 6718 E – Aspitates conspersarius
- 6719 W – Aspitates taylori
- 6720 E – Lytrosis unitaria, common lytrosis moth
- 6721 E – Lytrosis sinuosa, sinuous lytrosis moth
- 6722 B – Lytrosis heitzmanorum
- 6723 E – Lytrosis permagnaria
- 6724 E – Euchlaena serrata, saw-wing moth
- 6725 E – Euchlaena muzaria, muzaria euchlaena moth
- 6726 E – Euchlaena obtusaria, obtuse euchlaena moth
- 6727 W – Euchlaena silacea
- 6728 E – Euchlaena effecta, effective euchlaena moth
- 6729 E – Euchlaena johnsonaria, Johnson's euchlaena moth
- 6730 W – Euchlaena mollisaria
- 6731 E – Euchlaena madusaria, scrub euchlaena moth
- 6732 E – Euchlaena deplanaria
- 6733 E – Euchlaena amoenaria, deep yellow euchlaena moth
- 6734 E – Euchlaena marginaria, ochre euchlaena moth
- 6735 E – Euchlaena pectinaria, forked euchlaena moth
- 6736 W – Euchlaena manubiaria
- 6737 B – Euchlaena tigrinaria, mottled euchlaena moth
- 6738 E – Euchlaena milnei
- 6739 E – Euchlaena irraria, least-marked euchlaena moth
- 6740 E – Xanthotype urticaria, false crocus geometer moth
- 6741 W – Xanthotype barnesi
- 6742 E – Xanthotype rufaria, rufous geometer moth
- 6743 E – Xanthotype sospeta, crocus geometer moth
- 6744 E – Xanthotype attenuaria
- 6745 E – Cymatophora approximaria, giant gray moth
- 6746 E – Stenaspilatodes antidiscaria
- 6747 B – Pero meskaria, Meske's pero moth
- 6748 B – Pero ancetaria, Hübner's pero moth
- 6749 W – Pero radiosaria
- 6750 W – Pero inviolata
- 6751 W – Pero flavisaria
- 6752 E – Pero zalissaria
- 6753 E – Pero honestaria, honest pero moth
- 6755 E – Pero morrisonaria, Morrison's pero moth
- 6756 W – Pero giganteus
- 6757 W – Pero mizon
- 6758 W – Pero macdunnoughi
- 6759 W – Pero modestus
- 6760 W – Pero behrensaria
- 6761 W – Pero occidentalis
- 6762 E – Pero nerisaria
- 6762.1 W – Pero pima
- 6762.2 W – Pero catalina
- 6762.3 – Pero lastima
- 6763 E – Phaeoura quernaria, oak beauty moth
- 6764 W – Phaeoura cristifera
- 6765 W – Phaeoura kirkwoodi
- 6766 B – Phaeoura mexicanaria
- 6767 W – Phaeoura belua
- 6768 W – Phaeoura perfidaria
- 6769 W – Phaeoura utahensis
- 6770 W – Phaeoura aetha
- 6771 W – Phaeoura cana
- 6772 – Thyrinteina arnobia
- 6773 W – Holochroa dissociarius
- 6774 W – Aethaloida packardaria
- 6775 – Hemimorina dissociata
- 6776 W – Hemnypia baueri
- 6777 W – Parexcelsa ultraria
- 6778 W – Ceratonyx arizonensis
- 6779 W – Ceratonyx permagnaria
- 6780 E – Ceratonyx satanaria
- 6781 W – Gabriola dyari
- 6782 W – Gabriola sierrae
- 6783 W – Gabriola minima
- 6784 W – Gabriola minor
- 6785 W – Gabriola regularia
- 6786 W – Yermoia perplexata
- 6787 W – Yermoia glaucina
- 6788 W – Animomyia smithii
- 6789 W – Animomyia dilatata
- 6790 B – Animomyia hardwicki
- 6791 W – Animomyia morta
- 6792 W – Animomyia turgida
- 6793 W – Animomyia nuda
- 6794 W – Animomyia minuta
- 6795 – Colotois pennaria
- 6796 B – Campaea perlata, pale beauty moth
- 6797 E – Ennomos magnaria, maple spanworm moth
- 6797.1 W – Ennomos alniaria, canary-shouldered thorn moth
- 6798 E – Ennomos subsignaria, elm spanworm moth
- 6799 B – Spodolepis substriataria
- 6800 E – Sphacelodes vulneraria
- 6801 E – Sphacelodes haitiaria
- 6802 W – Philedia punctomacularia
- 6803 E – Petrophora divisata, common petrophora moth
- 6804 E – Petrophora subaequaria, northern petrophora moth
- 6805 E – Tacparia zalissaria
- 6806 E – Tacparia atropunctata
- 6807 E – Tacparia detersata, pale alder moth
- 6808 W – Thallophaga taylorata
- 6809 W – Thallophaga hyperborea
- 6810 W – Thallophaga nigroseriata
- 6811 E – Homochlodes lactispargaria
- 6812 E – Homochlodes fritillaria, pale homochlodes moth
- 6813 E – Homochlodes disconventa
- 6815 E – Gueneria similaria
- 6816 W – Slossonia rubrotincta
- 6817 E – Selenia alciphearia, northern selenia moth
- 6818 E – Selenia kentaria, Kent's geometer moth
- 6819 B – Metanema inatomaria, pale metanema moth
- 6820 E – Metanema determinata, dark metanema moth
- 6821 B – Metarranthis warneri, Warner's metarranthis moth
- 6822 E – Metarranthis duaria, ruddy metarranthis moth
- 6823 E – Metarranthis angularia, angled metarranthis moth
- 6824 E – Metarranthis amyrisaria
- 6825 B – Metarranthis indeclinata, pale metarranthis moth
- 6826 E – Metarranthis hypochraria, common metarranthis moth
- 6827 E – Metarranthis refractaria, refracted metarranthis moth
- 6828 E – Metarranthis homuraria, purplish metarranthis moth
- 6829 E – Metarranthis lateritiaria
- 6830 E – Metarranthis pilosaria
- 6831 E – Metarranthis apiciaria
- 6832 E – Metarranthis obfirmaria, yellow-washed metarranthis moth
- 6833 E – Metarranthis mollicularia
- 6834 E – Cepphis decoloraria, dark scallop moth
- 6835 E – Cepphis armataria, scallop moth
- 6836 B – Plagodis pulveraria, American barred umber moth
- 6837 B – Probole alienaria, alien probole moth
- 6838 B – Probole amicaria, friendly probole moth
- 6839 E – Probole nepiasaria, heath probole moth
- 6840 E – Plagodis serinaria, lemon plagodis moth
- 6841 E – Plagodis kuetzingi, purple plagodis moth
- 6842 E – Plagodis phlogosaria, straight-lined plagodis moth
- 6843 E – Plagodis fervidaria, fervid plagodis moth
- 6844 E – Plagodis alcoolaria, hollow-spotted plagodis moth
- 6845 W – Philtraea elegantaria
- 6846 W – Philtraea utahensis
- 6847 W – Philtraea surcaliforniae
- 6848 W – Philtraea latifoliae
- 6849 W – Philtraea albimaxima
- 6850 W – Philtraea paucimacula
- 6851 E – Philtraea monillata
- 6852 W – Eriplatymetra coloradaria
- 6853 W – Eriplatymetra lentifluata
- 6854 W – Eriplatymetra grotearia
- 6855 W – Melemaea magdalena
- 6856 W – Melemaea virgata
- 6857 W – Lychnosea helveolaria
- 6858 E – Lychnosea intermicata
- 6859 W – Neoterpes ephelidaria
- 6860 W – Neoterpes trianguliferata
- 6861 W – Neoterpes edwardsata
- 6862 W – Neoterpes graefiaria
- 6863 E – Caripeta divisata, gray spruce looper moth
- 6864 E – Caripeta piniata, northern pine looper moth
- 6865 W – Caripeta aequaliaria, red girdle moth
- 6865.1 W – Caripeta suffusata
- 6866 W – Caripeta interalbicans
- 6867 E – Caripeta angustiorata, brown pine looper moth
- 6868 E – Caripeta latiorata
- 6869 E – Caripeta aretaria, southern pine looper moth
- 6870 W – Caripeta pulcherrima
- 6871 W – Caripeta hilumaria
- 6872 W – Caripeta canidiaria
- 6873 W – Caripeta ocellaria
- 6874 W – Caripeta macularia
- 6875 W – Snowia montanaria
- 6876 W – Nemeris speciosa
- 6876.1 W – Nemeris percne
- 6876.2 W – Nemeris sternitzkyi
- 6877 W – Meris paradoxa
- 6878 W – Meris suffusaria
- 6879 W – Meris patula
- 6879.1 – Meris alticola
- 6879.2 – Meris cultrata
- 6880 W – Destutia flumenata
- 6881 W – Destutia novata
- 6882 W – Destutia oblentaria
- 6883 W – Destutia excelsa
- 6884 E – Besma endropiaria, straw besma moth
- 6885 B – Besma quercivoraria, oak besma moth
- 6886 W – Besma rubritincta
- 6887 W – Besma sesquilinearia
- 6888 B – Lambdina fiscellaria, hemlock looper moth
- 6889 E – Lambdina pultaria, southern oak looper moth
- 6890 W – Lambdina flavilinearia
- 6891 W – Lambdina laeta
- 6892 E – Lambdina pellucidaria, yellow-headed looper moth
- 6893 E – Lambdina canitiaria
- 6894 E – Lambdina fervidaria, curve-lined looper moth
- 6895 W – Lambdina vitraria
- 6896 W – Lambdina phantoma
- 6897 W – Evita hyalinaria
- 6898 E – Cingilia catenaria, chain-dotted geometer moth
- 6899 W – Nepytia umbrosaria
- 6900 W – Nepytia regulata
- 6901 W – Nepytia disputata
- 6902 W – Nepytia janetae
- 6903 W – Nepytia juabata
- 6904 W – Nepytia lagunata
- 6905 W – Nepytia swetti
- 6906 E – Nepytia canosaria, false hemlock looper moth
- 6907 W – Nepytia phantasmaria, phantom hemlock looper moth
- 6908 E – Nepytia semiclusaria, pine conelet looper moth
- 6909 E – Nepytia pellucidaria
- 6910 W – Nepytia freemani
- 6911 B – Sicya crocearia
- 6912 B – Sicya macularia, sharp-lined yellow moth
- 6913 W – Sicya laetula
- 6914 W – Sicya pergilvaria
- 6915 W – Sicya morsicaria
- 6916 W – Sicya olivata
- 6916.1 – Sicyopsis blanchardata
- 6917 W – Euaspilates spinataria
- 6918 W – Eucaterva variaria
- 6919 W – Eucaterva bonniwelli
- 6920 W – Acanthotoca graefi
- 6921 W – Plataea calcaria
- 6921.1 – Plataea blanchardaria
- 6922 W – Plataea personaria
- 6923 W – Plataea ursaria
- 6924 W – Plataea californiaria
- 6925 W – Plataea diva
- 6926 W – Plataea trilinearia, sagebrush girdle moth
- 6927 W – Eusarca falcata
- 6928 W – Eusarca terraria
- 6929 W – Eusarca argillaria
- 6930 W – Eusarca galbanaria
- 6931 W – Eusarca detractaria
- 6932 W – Eusarca lutzi
- 6933 E – Eusarca fundaria, dark-edged eusarca moth
- 6934 E – Eusarca subflavaria
- 6935 – Eusarca distycharia
- 6936 B – Eusarca packardaria, Packard's eusarca moth
- 6937 W – Eusarca venosaria
- 6938 W – Eusarca subcineraria
- 6939 W – Eusarca geniculata
- 6940 W – Eusarca tibiaria
- 6941 B – Eusarca confusaria, confused eusarca moth
- 6942 W – Eusarca graceiaria
- 6943 W – Somatolophia desolata
- 6944 W – Somatolophia montana
- 6945 W – Somatolophia ectrapelaria
- 6946 W – Somatolophia pallescens
- 6947 W – Somatolophia haydenata
- 6948 W – Somatolophia incana
- 6948.1 W – Somatolophia vatia
- 6948.2 W – Somatolophia petila
- 6948.3 W – Somatolophia simplicius
- 6948.4 W – Somatolophia cuyama
- 6949 W – Pherne placeraria
- 6950 W – Pherne parallelia
- 6951 W – Pherne sperryi
- 6952 W – Pherne subpunctata
- 6953 W – Tetracis fuscata
- 6954 W – Tetracis jubararia, October thorn moth
- 6954.1 W – Tetracis montanaria
- 6955 W – Tetracis pallulata
- 6956 W – Tetracis cervinaria
- 6956.1 W – Tetracis australis
- 6957 W – Caripeta triangulata
- 6958 W – Tetracis formosa
- 6959 W – Tetracis barnesii
- 6960 W – Tetracis hirsutaria
- 6960.1 W – Tetracis pallidata
- 6961 W – Tetracis mosesiani
- 6962 W – Metanema brunneilinearia
- 6963 E – Tetracis crocallata, yellow slant-line moth
- 6964 E – Tetracis cachexiata, white slant-line moth
- 6965 E – Eugonobapta nivosaria, snowy geometer moth
- 6966 E – Eutrapela clemataria, curve-toothed geometer moth
- 6967 E – Oxydia vesulia, spurge spanworm moth
- 6968 E – Oxydia cubana, Cuban spanworm moth
- 6969 E – Oxydia gueneei
- 6970 E – Oxydia nimbata
- 6971 W – Oxydia mundata
- 6972 E – Oxydia masthala
- 6973 W – Phyllodonta peccataria
- 6973.1 W – Phyllodonta sarukhani
- 6974 E – Patalene olyzonaria, juniper geometer moth
- 6975 E – Patalene epionata
- 6976 – Patalene nicoaria
- 6977 W – Prochoerodes truxaliata
- 6978 W – Prochoerodes amplicineraria
- 6979 W – Prochoerodes accentuata
- 6980 – Prochoerodes nonangulata
- 6981 W – Prochoerodes forficaria
- 6982 B – Prochoerodes lineola, large maple spanworm moth
- 6983 – Prochoerodes olivata
- 6984 W – Pityeja ornata
- 6985 E – Nepheloleuca politia
- 6986 E – Nepheloleuca floridata
- 6987 E – Antepione thisoaria, variable antepione moth
- 6990 W – Antepione imitata
- 6992 W – Pionenta ochreata
- 6994 E – Sericoptera virginaria
- 6995 W – Sabulodes aegrotata
- 6996 W – Sabulodes dissimilis
- 6997 W – Sabulodes sericeata
- 6998 W – Sabulodes huachuca
- 6999 W – Sabulodes mabelata
- 7000 W – Sabulodes niveostriata
- 7001 W – Sabulodes olifata
- 7002 W – Sabulodes duoangulata
- 7003 W – Sabulodes spoliata
- 7004 W – Sabulodes edwardsata
- 7005 W – Enypia venata, variable girdle moth
- 7006 W – Enypia griseata, mountain girdle moth
- 7007 W – Enypia packardata, Packard's girdle moth
- 7008 W – Enypia coolidgi
- 7009 E – Ligdia wagneri
- 7010 B – Nematocampa resistaria, horned spanworm moth
- 7010.1 E – Nematocampa baggettaria, Baggett's spanworm moth
- 7011 W – Nematocampa brehmeata
- 7011.1 – Tesiophora entephros
- 7011.2 – Anavinemia acomos
- 7012 W – Chlorosea nevadaria
- 7013 W – Chlorosea banksaria
- 7014 W – Chlorosea margaretaria
- 7015 W – Chlorosea roseitacta
- 7016 W – Nemoria pulcherrima
- 7017 W – Nemoria mutaticolor
- 7018 B – Nemoria unitaria, single-lined emerald moth
- 7019 W – Nemoria latirosaria
- 7020 W – Nemoria aemularia
- 7021 W – Nemoria arizonaria
- 7022 W – Nemoria daedalea
- 7023 W – Nemoria viridicaria
- 7024 W – Nemoria subsequens
- 7025 W – Nemoria diamesa
- 7026 W – Nemoria albaria
- 7027 W – Nemoria pistaciaria
- 7028 E – Nemoria extremaria
- 7029 E – Nemoria elfa, cypress emerald moth
- 7030 E – Nemoria tuscarora
- 7031 E – Nemoria catachloa
- 7032 E – Nemoria outina
- 7033 E – Nemoria lixaria, red-bordered emerald moth
- 7034 E – Nemoria saturiba
- 7035 W – Nemoria darwiniata, Columbian emerald moth
- 7036 W – Nemoria zelotes
- 7037 W – Nemoria obliqua
- 7038 W – Nemoria splendidaria
- 7039 W – Nemoria strigataria
- 7040 W – Nemoria zygotaria
- 7041 W – Nemoria leptalea
- 7042 W – Nemoria caerulescens
- 7043 W – Nemoria intensaria
- 7044 W – Nemoria festaria
- 7044.1 – Nemoria albilineata
- 7045 E – Nemoria bifilata, white-barred emerald moth
- 7046 E – Nemoria bistriaria, red-fringed emerald moth
- 7047 E – Nemoria rubrifrontaria, red-fronted emerald moth
- 7048 E – Nemoria mimosaria, white-fringed emerald moth
- 7049 W – Nemoria glaucomarginaria
- 7050 W – Nemoria rindgei
- 7051 E – Phrudocentra centrifugaria
- 7052 W – Phrudocentra neis
- 7053 E – Dichorda iridaria, showy emerald moth
- 7054 W – Dichorda consequaria
- 7055 W – Dichorda illustraria
- 7056 W – Dichorda rectaria
- 7057 W – Dichordophora phoenix, phoenix emerald moth
- 7058 B – Synchlora aerata, wavy-lined emerald moth
- 7059 B – Synchlora frondaria, southern emerald moth
- 7060 E – Synchlora xysteraria
- 7060.1 E – Synchlora gerularia
- 7061 E – Synchlora herbaria
- 7062 W – Synchlora irregularia
- 7063 W – Synchlora noel
- 7064 E – Synchlora cupedinaria
- 7065 W – Synchlora bistriaria, oblique-striped emerald moth
- 7066 W – Synchlora pectinaria
- 7067 W – Synchlora faseolaria
- 7068 W – Synchlora graefiaria
- 7069 W – Lophochorista lesteraria
- 7070 E – Eueana niveociliaria
- 7071 E – Chlorochlamys chloroleucaria, blackberry looper moth
- 7072 W – Chlorochlamys triangularis
- 7073 W – Chlorochlamys appellaria
- 7074 W – Chlorochlamys phyllinaria, thin-lined chlorochlamys moth
- 7075 E – Chloropteryx tepperaria, angle-winged emerald moth
- 7076 W – Chloropteryx nordicaria
- 7077 E – Chloropteryx paularia
- 7078 W – Xerochlora viridipallens
- 7079 W – Xerochlora inveterascaria
- 7080 W – Xerochlora martinaria
- 7081 W – Xerochlora masonaria
- 7082 W – Xerochlora mesotheides
- 7083 W – Hemithea aestivaria, common emerald moth
- 7084 E – Hethemia pistasciaria, pistachio emerald moth
- 7085 B – Mesothea incertata, day emerald moth
- 7086 E – Eumacrodes yponomeutaria
- 7087 W – Euacidalia sericearia
- 7088 W – Euacidalia puerta
- 7089 W – Euacidalia quakerata
- 7090 E – Euacidalia brownsvillea
- 7091 – Euacidalia nigridaria
- 7092 W – Protoproutia rusticaria
- 7093 W – Protoproutia laredoata
- 7094 B – Lobocleta ossularia, drab brown wave moth
- 7095 W – Lobocleta granitaria
- 7096 W – Lobocleta quaesitata
- 7097 B – Lobocleta plemyraria, straight-lined wave moth
- 7098 W – Lobocleta lanceolata
- 7099 W – Lobocleta griseata
- 7100 B – Lobocleta peralbata
- 7101 E – Idaea minuta
- 7102 B – Idaea bonifata
- 7103 W – Idaea nibseata
- 7104 E – Idaea microphysa
- 7105 E – Idaea scintillularia, diminutive wave moth
- 7106 E – Idaea insulensis
- 7107 E – Idaea pervertipennis
- 7108 B – Idaea furciferata, notch-winged wave moth
- 7109 E – Idaea celtima
- 7110 W – Idaea basinta, red-and-white wave moth
- 7111 W – Idaea skinnerata
- 7112 B – Idaea productata
- 7113 – Idaea miranda
- 7114 E – Idaea demissaria, red-bordered wave moth
- 7115 B – Idaea eremiata, straw wave moth
- 7116 W – Idaea gemmata
- 7117 W – Idaea occidentaria
- 7117.1 W – Idaea asceta
- 7118 E – Idaea hilliata, Hill's wave moth
- 7119 E – Idaea micropterata
- 7120 E – Idaea violacearia
- 7121 E – Idaea ostentaria, showy wave moth
- 7122 E – Idaea tacturata, dot-lined wave moth
- 7123 B – Idaea obfusaria, rippled wave moth
- 7124 E – Idaea retractaria
- 7125 E – Idaea rotundopennata
- 7126 B – Idaea dimidiata, single-dotted wave moth
- 7127 W – Paota fultaria
- 7128 W – Arcobara multilineata
- 7129 W – Arcobara perlineata
- 7130 B – Odontoptila obrimo
- 7131 – Ptychamalia dorneraria
- 7132 B – Pleuroprucha insulsaria, common tan wave moth
- 7133 E – Pleuroprucha asthenaria, asthene wave moth
- 7134 E – Cyclophora culicaria
- 7135 W – Cyclophora dataria
- 7136 E – Cyclophora packardi, Packard's wave moth
- 7137 E – Cyclophora myrtaria, waxmyrtle wave moth
- 7138 E – Cyclophora benjamini
- 7139 E – Cyclophora pendulinaria, sweetfern geometer moth
- 7140 B – Cyclophora nanaria
- 7141 – Semaeopus ella
- 7142 – Semaeopus gracilata
- 7143 – Semaeopus cantona
- 7144 – Semaeopus caecaria
- 7145 – Semaeopus marginata
- 7146 E – Haematopis grataria, chickweed geometer moth
- 7147 E – Timandra amaturaria, cross-lined wave moth
- 7148 E – Acratodes suavata
- 7149 E – Scopula lautaria, small frosted wave moth
- 7150 – Scopula eburneata
- 7151 E – Scopula aemulata
- 7152 E – Scopula compensata
- 7153 W – Scopula apparitaria
- 7154 B – Scopula plantagenaria
- 7155 – Scopula benitaria
- 7156 E – Scopula umbilicata, swag-lined wave moth
- 7157 E – Scopula cacuminaria, frosted tan wave moth
- 7158 E – Scopula purata, chalky wave moth
- 7159 E – Scopula limboundata, large lace-border moth
- 7160 E – Scopula timandrata
- 7161 E – Scopula ordinata
- 7162 B – Scopula ancellata, angled wave moth
- 7163 W – Scopula fuscata
- 7164 B – Scopula junctaria, simple wave moth
- 7164.1 E – Scopula quinquelinearia
- 7165 E – Scopula quadrilineata, four-lined wave moth
- 7166 E – Scopula frigidaria, frigid wave moth
- 7167 W – Scopula siccata
- 7168 W – Scopula septentrionicola
- 7169 B – Scopula inductata, soft-lined wave moth
- 7170 W – Scopula luteolata
- 7171 W – Scopula sideraria
- 7172 E – Scopula sentinaria
- 7173 E – Leptostales pannaria, pannaria wave moth
- 7174 E – Leptostales crossii, Cross's wave moth
- 7175 E – Leptostales hepaticaria
- 7176 E – Leptostales rubrotincta
- 7177 B – Leptostales laevitaria, raspberry wave moth
- 7178 E – Leptostales oblinataria
- 7179 B – Leptostales rubromarginaria, dark-ribboned wave moth
- 7180 E – Leptostales ferruminaria
- 7181 E – Lophosis labeculata, stained lophosis moth
- 7181.1 – Cambogia tegularia
- 7182 B – Dysstroma citrata, dark marbled carpet moth
- 7183 W – Dysstroma hewlettaria
- 7184 W – Dysstroma sobria
- 7185 E – Dysstroma suspectata
- 7186 W – Dysstroma ochrofuscaria
- 7187 B – Dysstroma truncata, marbled carpet moth
- 7188 B – Dysstroma walkerata, orange-spotted carpet moth
- 7189 E – Dysstroma hersiliata, orange-barred carpet moth
- 7190 W – Dysstroma rutlandia
- 7191 B – Dysstroma formosa, Formosa carpet moth
- 7192 W – Dysstroma colvillei
- 7193 W – Dysstroma rectiflavata
- 7194 B – Dysstroma brunneata
- 7195 W – Dysstroma mancipata
- 7196 E – Eulithis diversilineata, lesser grapevine looper moth
- 7197 E – Eulithis gracilineata, greater grapevine looper moth
- 7198 W – Eulithis luteolata
- 7199 E – Eulithis propulsata
- 7199.1 E – Eulithis prunata
- 7200 E – Eulithis populata
- 7201 E – Eulithis testata, chevron moth
- 7202 E – Eulithis mellinata
- 7203 E – Eulithis molliculata, dimorphic eulithis moth
- 7204 E – Eulithis destinata
- 7205 E – Eulithis flavibrunneata
- 7206 E – Eulithis explanata, white eulithis moth
- 7207 W – Eulithis xylina
- 7208 E – Eulithis serrataria, serrated eulithis moth
- 7209 W – Eurhinosea flavaria
- 7210 E – Eustroma semiatrata, black-banded carpet moth
- 7211 W – Eustroma fasciata
- 7212 W – Eustroma atrifasciata
- 7213 B – Ecliptopera silaceata, small phoenix moth
- 7214 – Ecliptopera atricolorata, dark-banded geometer moth
- 7215 W – Colostygia turbata
- 7216 B – Plemyria georgii, George's carpet moth
- 7217 E – Thera juniperata, juniper carpet moth
- 7218 E – Thera contractata, early juniper carpet moth
- 7219 W – Thera otisi
- 7220 W – Thera latens
- 7221 W – Ceratodalia gueneata
- 7222 W – Hydriomena tuolumne
- 7223 E – Hydriomena exculpata
- 7224 W – Hydriomena expurgata
- 7225 W – Hydriomena shasta
- 7226 W – Hydriomena borussata
- 7227 W – Hydriomena henshawi
- 7228 W – Hydriomena irata
- 7229 B – Hydriomena perfracta, shattered hydriomena moth
- 7230 W – Hydriomena charlestonia
- 7231 W – Hydriomena marinata
- 7232 W – Hydriomena edenata
- 7233 W – Hydriomena furtivata
- 7234 W – Hydriomena johnstoni
- 7235 E – Hydriomena divisaria, black-dashed hydriomena moth
- 7236 E – Hydriomena renunciata, renounced hydriomena moth
- 7237 E – Hydriomena transfigurata, transfigured hydriomena moth
- 7238 E – Hydriomena bistriolata
- 7239 E – Hydriomena pluviata, sharp green hydriomena moth
- 7240 W – Hydriomena obliquilinea
- 7241 W – Hydriomena rita
- 7242 W – Hydriomena arizonata
- 7243 W – Hydriomena albimontanata
- 7244 W – Hydriomena sierrae
- 7245 W – Hydriomena nevadae
- 7246 W – Hydriomena californiata
- 7247 W – Hydriomena crokeri
- 7248 W – Hydriomena glaucata
- 7249 W – Hydriomena muscata
- 7250 W – Hydriomena chiricahuata
- 7251 W – Hydriomena modestata
- 7252 E – Hydriomena mississippiensis
- 7253 W – Hydriomena feminata
- 7254 B – Hydriomena ruberata, ruddy highflyer moth
- 7255 W – Hydriomena macdunnoughi
- 7256 W – Hydriomena septemberata
- 7257 E – Hydriomena furcata, July highflyer moth
- 7258 W – Hydriomena quinquefasciata
- 7259 W – Hydriomena catalinata
- 7260 W – Hydriomena costipunctata
- 7261 W – Hydriomena albifasciata
- 7262 W – Hydriomena cochiseata
- 7263 W – Hydriomena speciosata
- 7264 W – Hydriomena morosata
- 7265 W – Hydriomena barnesata
- 7266 W – Hydriomena cyriadoides
- 7267 W – Hydriomena sperryi
- 7268 W – Hydriomena bryanti
- 7269 W – Hydriomena clarki
- 7270 W – Hydriomena magnificata
- 7271 W – Hydriomena gracillima
- 7272 W – Hydriomena regulata
- 7273 W – Hydriomena furculoides
- 7274 W – Hydriomena peratica
- 7275 W – Hydriomena similaris
- 7276 W – Hydriomena nubilofasciata, oak winter highflier moth
- 7277 W – Hydriomena manzanita
- 7278 W – Hymenodria mediodentata
- 7279 W – Ersephila indistincta
- 7280 W – Ersephila grandipennis
- 7281 W – Carptima hydriomenata
- 7282 W – Cyclica frondaria
- 7283 W – Grossbeckia semimaculata
- 7284 W – Eutrepsia inconstans
- 7285 B – Triphosa haesitata, tissue moth
- 7286 E – Triphosa affirmata
- 7287 W – Triphosa californiata
- 7288 W – Triphosa bipectinata
- 7289 W – Monostoecha semipectinata
- 7290 B – Coryphista meadii, barberry geometer moth
- 7291 B – Rheumaptera undulata
- 7292 E – Rheumaptera prunivorata, Ferguson's scallop shell moth
- 7293 E – Rheumaptera hastata, spear-marked black moth
- 7294 B – Rheumaptera subhastata, white-banded black moth
- 7295 W – Archirhoe neomexicana
- 7296 W – Archirhoe indefinata
- 7297 W – Archirhoe associata
- 7298 W – Archirhoe multipunctata
- 7299 E – Pterocypha floridata
- 7300 E – Entephria aurata
- 7300.1 W – Entephria beringiana
- 7300.2 E – Entephria bradorata
- 7300.3 W – Entephria kidluitata
- 7301 W – Entephria multivagata
- 7302 W – Entephria takuata
- 7303 W – Entephria lagganata
- 7303.1 W – Entephria lynda
- 7305 W – Entephria inventaraia
- 7306 B – Entephria polata
- 7306.1 W – Entephria punctipes
- 7306.2 E – Entephria separata
- 7307 E – Mesoleuca ruficillata, white-ribboned carpet moth
- 7308 W – Mesoleuca gratulata, western white-ribboned carpet moth
- 7309 W – Spargania viridescens
- 7310 W – Spargania aurata
- 7311 W – Spargania bellipicta
- 7312 E – Spargania magnoliata, double-banded carpet moth
- 7313 E – Spargania luctuata
- 7314 B – Hammaptera parinotata
- 7315 W – Psaliodes fervescens
- 7316 E – Perizoma basaliata, square-patched carpet moth
- 7317 W – Perizoma grandis
- 7318 W – Perizoma alaskae
- 7319 W – Perizoma actuata
- 7320 E – Perizoma alchemillata, small rivulet moth
- 7321 W – Perizoma interrupta
- 7322 W – Perizoma ochreata
- 7323 W – Perizoma oxygramma
- 7324 W – Perizoma curvilinea
- 7325 W – Perizoma costiguttata
- 7326 W – Perizoma epictata
- 7327 W – Perizoma ablata
- 7328 W – Perizoma custodiata
- 7329 E – Anticlea vasiliata, variable carpet moth
- 7330 B – Anticlea multiferata, many-lined carpet moth
- 7331 W – Anticlea switzeraria
- 7332 W – Anticlea pectinata
- 7333 E – Stamnodes gibbicostata, shiny gray carpet moth
- 7334 W – Stamnodes blackmorei
- 7335 W – Stamnodes albiapicata
- 7336 W – Stamnodes reckseckeri
- 7337 W – Stamnodes affiliata
- 7338 W – Stamnodes delicata
- 7339 W – Stamnodes mendocinoensis
- 7340 W – Stamnodes annellata
- 7341 W – Stamnodes coenonymphata
- 7342 W – Stamnodes eldridgensis
- 7343 W – Stamnodes marinata
- 7344 W – Stamnodes splendorata
- 7345 W – Stamnodes apollo
- 7346 W – Stamnodes artemis
- 7347 W – Stamnodes formosata
- 7348 W – Stamnodes lampra
- 7349 E – Stamnodes topazata
- 7350 W – Stamnodes franckata
- 7351 W – Stamnodes modocata
- 7352 W – Stamnodes cassinoi
- 7353 W – Stamnodes seiferti
- 7354 W – Stamnodes fervefactaria
- 7355 W – Stamnodes deceptiva
- 7356 W – Stamnoctenis morrisata
- 7357 W – Stamnoctenis pearsalli
- 7358 W – Stamnoctenis rubrosuffusa
- 7359 W – Stamnodes ululata
- 7360 W – Stamnodes costimacula
- 7361 W – Stamnodes similis
- 7362 W – Stamnoctenis vernon
- 7363 W – Stamnodes marmorata
- 7364 W – Stamnodes tessellata
- 7365 W – Stamnodes watsoni
- 7366 W – Stamnodes animata
- 7367 – Heterusia atalantata
- 7368 E – Xanthorhoe labradorensis, Labrador carpet moth
- 7369 E – Xanthorhoe packardata
- 7370 B – Xanthorhoe abrasaria
- 7371 E – Xanthorhoe iduata
- 7372 W – Xanthorhoe macdunnoughi
- 7373 E – Xanthorhoe ramaria
- 7374 W – Xanthorhoe incursata
- 7375 W – Xanthorhoe reclivisata
- 7376 E – Xanthorhoe baffinensis
- 7377 W – Xanthorhoe dodata
- 7378 E – Xanthorhoe algidata
- 7379 W – Xanthorhoe pontiaria
- 7380 W – Xanthorhoe fossaria
- 7381 W – Xanthorhoe montanata
- 7382 W – Xanthorhoe marinensis
- 7383 W – Xanthorhoe spaldingaria
- 7384 B – Xanthorhoe decoloraria
- 7385 W – Xanthorhoe alticolata
- 7386 W – Xanthorhoe defensaria
- 7387 W – Xanthorhoe offensaria
- 7388 E – Xanthorhoe ferrugata, red twin-spot moth
- 7389 – Xanthorhoe borealis
- 7389.1 W – Xanthorhoe clarkeata
- 7390 E – Xanthorhoe lacustrata, toothed brown carpet moth
- 7391 W – Xanthorhoe dentilinea
- 7392 W – Xanthorhoe mirabilata
- 7393 – Xanthorhoe columelloides
- 7394 E – Epirrhoe alternata, white-banded toothed carpet moth
- 7395 W – Epirrhoe plebeculata
- 7396 E – Epirrhoe sperryi
- 7397 W – Epirrhoe medeifascia
- 7398 W – Euphyia swetti
- 7399 B – Euphyia intermediata, sharp-angled carpet moth
- 7400 W – Euphyia implicata
- 7401 W – Euphyia minima
- 7402 W – Enchoria osculata
- 7403 W – Enchoria lacteata
- 7404 W – Enchoria herbicolata
- 7405 – Loxofidonia acidaliata
- 7406 B – Zenophleps lignicolorata
- 7407 W – Zenophleps pallescens
- 7408 B – Zenophleps alpinata
- 7409 W – Zenophleps obscurata
- 7410 W – Psychophora sabini
- 7411 E – Psychophora phocata
- 7412 E – Psychophora suttoni
- 7413 E – Psychophora immaculata
- 7414 B – Orthonama obstipata, gem moth
- 7415 E – Orthonama evansi
- 7416 B – Costaconvexa centrostrigaria, bent-line carpet moth
- 7417 E – Disclisioprocta stellata, somber carpet moth
- 7418 W – Herreshoffia gracea
- 7419 E – Hydrelia lucata, light carpet moth
- 7420 E – Hydrelia condensata
- 7421 – Hydrelia terraenovae
- 7422 E – Hydrelia inornata, unadorned carpet moth
- 7423 E – Hydrelia albifera, fragile white carpet moth
- 7424 W – Hydrelia brunneifasciata
- 7425 E – Venusia cambrica, Welsh wave moth
- 7426 W – Venusia duodecemlineata
- 7427 W – Venusia obsoleta
- 7428 E – Venusia comptaria, brown-shaded carpet moth
- 7429 W – Venusia pearsalli, Pearsall's carpet moth
- 7430 E – Trichodezia albovittata, white-striped black moth
- 7431 – Trichodezia albofasciata
- 7432 W – Trichodezia californiata
- 7433 B – Epirrita autumnata, autumnal moth
- 7434 W – Epirrita undulata
- 7435 W – Epirrita pulchraria, whitelined looper moth
- 7436 E – Operophtera brumata, winter moth
- 7437 B – Operophtera bruceata, bruce spanworm moth
- 7439 W – Operophtera danbyi
- 7439.1 – Tescalsia giulianiata
- 7439.2 – Tescalsia minata
- 7440 B – Eubaphe mendica, beggar moth
- 7440.1 – Eubaphe medea
- 7441 E – Eubaphe meridiana, little beggar moth
- 7442 – Eubaphe helveta
- 7443 W – Eubaphe rotundata
- 7444 W – Eubaphe unicolor
- 7445 B – Horisme intestinata, brown bark carpet moth
- 7446 B – Horisme incana
- 7447 – Horisme rectilineata
- 7448 – Horisme gillettei
- 7449 E – Eupithecia palpata, small pine looper moth
- 7451 E – Eupithecia slossonata
- 7452 W – Eupithecia albimontanata
- 7453 E – Eupithecia peckorum, Peck's pug moth
- 7454 B – Eupithecia longidens
- 7455 B – Eupithecia ornata
- 7456 W – Eupithecia monacheata
- 7457 W – Eupithecia terrestrata
- 7458 W – Eupithecia karenae
- 7459 E – Eupithecia columbiata
- 7460 W – Eupithecia maestosa
- 7461 W – Eupithecia subvirens
- 7462 W – Eupithecia castellata
- 7463 W – Eupithecia chiricahuata
- 7464 W – Eupithecia insolabilis
- 7465 W – Eupithecia catalinata
- 7466 W – Eupithecia edna
- 7467 W – Eupithecia owenata
- 7468 W – Eupithecia longipalpata
- 7469 W – Eupithecia sabulosata
- 7470 W – Eupithecia macrocarpata
- 7471 W – Eupithecia placidata
- 7472 W – Eupithecia unicolor
- 7473 W – Eupithecia pseudotsugata
- 7474 B – Eupithecia miserulata, common eupithecia moth
- 7475 – Eupithecia chlorofasciata
- 7476 B – Eupithecia misturata
- 7478 W – Eupithecia bivittata
- 7479 W – Eupithecia pygmaeata
- 7479.1 – Eupithecia broui
- 7480 W – Eupithecia bryanti
- 7481 E – Eupithecia coloradensis
- 7482 W – Eupithecia cretata
- 7483 B – Eupithecia regina
- 7484 B – Eupithecia undata
- 7485 B – Eupithecia borealis
- 7486 E – Eupithecia jejunata
- 7487 – Eupithecia subfuscata, grey pug moth
- 7488 E – Eupithecia tripunctaria
- 7489 – Eupithecia luteata
- 7490 W – Eupithecia harrisonata
- 7491 E – Eupithecia fletcherata
- 7492 E – Eupithecia casloata
- 7494 E – Eupithecia sheppardata
- 7495 E – Eupithecia affinata
- 7496 W – Eupithecia rotundopuncta
- 7497 W – Eupithecia sierrae
- 7498 W – Eupithecia litoris
- 7499 W – Eupithecia quakerata
- 7500 W – Eupithecia bolterii
- 7501 W – Eupithecia palmata
- 7502 W – Eupithecia piccata
- 7503 W – Eupithecia pretansata
- 7504 W – Eupithecia neomexicana
- 7505 W – Eupithecia alpinata
- 7506 W – Eupithecia prostrata
- 7507 W – Eupithecia persimulata
- 7508 – Eupithecia exudata
- 7509 B – Eupithecia herefordaria, Hereford's eupithecia moth
- 7509.1 B – Eupithecia matheri
- 7510 W – Eupithecia cazieri
- 7512 W – Eupithecia macdunnoughi
- 7513 W – Eupithecia nabokovi
- 7514 W – Eupithecia biedermanata
- 7515 W – Eupithecia cupressata
- 7516 E – Eupithecia albigrisata
- 7518 E – Eupithecia intricata
- 7519 W – Eupithecia uinta
- 7520 E – Eupithecia satyrata
- 7520.3 E – Eupithecia dodata
- 7522 E – Eupithecia nimbicolor
- 7523 E – Eupithecia strattonata
- 7524 E – Eupithecia cimicifugata
- 7526 E – Eupithecia russeliata
- 7527 B – Eupithecia ammonata
- 7530 E – Eupithecia swettii
- 7531 E – Eupithecia indistincta
- 7532 W – Eupithecia zygadeniata
- 7533 B – Eupithecia cretaceata
- 7534 W – Eupithecia nimbosa
- 7535 W – Eupithecia behrensata
- 7536 W – Eupithecia multiscripta
- 7537 – Eupithecia sewardata
- 7537.1 E – Eupithecia sharronata
- 7538 E – Eupithecia gelidata
- 7539 W – Eupithecia multistrigata
- 7540 E – Eupithecia perfusca
- 7543 B – Eupithecia annulata, larch pug moth
- 7544 – Eupithecia vinsullata
- 7546 W – Eupithecia olivacea
- 7547 W – Eupithecia cognizata
- 7548 W – Eupithecia lachrymosa
- 7548.1 W – Eupithecia lafontaineata
- 7548.2 E – Eupithecia lariciata, larch pug moth
- 7551 B – Eupithecia interruptofasciata, juniper looper moth
- 7552 W – Eupithecia niphadophilata
- 7553 W – Eupithecia subcolorata
- 7554 W – Eupithecia appendiculata
- 7554.1 E – Eupithecia assimilata
- 7555 W – Eupithecia zelmira
- 7555.1 – Eupithecia vicksburgi
- 7555.2 – Eupithecia fredericki
- 7556 W – Eupithecia vitreotata
- 7557 W – Eupithecia segregata
- 7558 W – Eupithecia pinata
- 7559 W – Eupithecia tenuata
- 7560 W – Eupithecia phyllisae
- 7561 W – Eupithecia agnesata
- 7562 W – Eupithecia huachuca
- 7563 W – Eupithecia woodgatata
- 7564 B – Eupithecia stellata
- 7565 E – Eupithecia bowmani
- 7566 W – Eupithecia niveifascia
- 7567 W – Eupithecia joanata
- 7568 W – Eupithecia flavigutta
- 7568.1 W – Eupithecia sonora
- 7569 W – Eupithecia sperryi
- 7570 E – Eupithecia johnstoni
- 7571 W – Eupithecia dichroma
- 7572 W – Eupithecia rindgei
- 7573 E – Eupithecia cocoata
- 7574 B – Eupithecia albicapitata
- 7575 E – Eupithecia mutata, spruce cone looper moth
- 7576 W – Eupithecia helena
- 7578 W – Eupithecia spermaphaga
- 7579 W – Eupithecia purpurissata
- 7580 W – Eupithecia mystiata
- 7581 W – Eupithecia gilvipennata
- 7583 W – Eupithecia scabrogata
- 7584 W – Eupithecia hohokamae
- 7585 W – Eupithecia adequata
- 7586 W – Eupithecia acutipennis
- 7586.1 B – Eupithecia absinthiata
- 7587 W – Eupithecia subapicata
- 7588 W – Eupithecia shirleyata
- 7589 W – Eupithecia sinuata
- 7590 W – Eupithecia redingtonia
- 7591 W – Eupithecia gilata
- 7592 W – Eupithecia plumasata
- 7593 W – Eupithecia jamesi
- 7594 B – Eupithecia anticaria
- 7595 W – Eupithecia pertusata
- 7596 W – Eupithecia tricolorata
- 7597 W – Eupithecia carneata
- 7598 W – Eupithecia classicata
- 7600 W – Eupithecia graefii
- 7601 W – Eupithecia nevadata
- 7602 W – Eupithecia implorata
- 7603 W – Eupithecia cestata
- 7604 W – Eupithecia cestatoides
- 7605 B – Eupithecia ravocostaliata, tawny eupithecia moth
- no number yet – Eupithecia macfarlandi
- no number yet – Eupithecia nonanticaria
- no number yet – Eupithecia penablanca
- 7606 W – Nasusina inferior
- 7606.1 W – Nasusina vallis
- 7607 W – Nasusina vaporata
- 7608 W – Nasusina mendicata
- 7609 W – Nasusina minuta
- 7610 W – Prorella emmedonia
- 7611 W – Prorella gypsata
- 7612 W – Prorella discoidalis
- 7613 W – Prorella leucata
- 7614 W – Prorella albida
- 7615 W – Prorella ochrocarneata
- 7616 W – Prorella irremorata
- 7617 W – Prorella tremorata
- 7618 W – Prorella remorata
- 7619 W – Prorella desperata
- 7620 W – Prorella artestata
- 7621 W – Prorella mellisa
- 7622 W – Prorella insipidata
- 7623 W – Prorella opinata
- 7624 – Prorella protoptata
- 7625 E – Pasiphila rectangulata, green pug moth
- 7626 E – Carsia sororiata
- 7627 B – Aplocera plagiata, treble-bar moth
- 7628 W – Lithostege rotundata
- 7629 W – Lithostege fuscata
- 7630 – Lithostege marcata
- 7631 W – Lithostege elegans
- 7632 W – Lithostege angelicata
- 7633 W – Lithostege deserticola
- 7634 W – Scelidacantha triseriata
- 7635 E – Acasis viridata, olive-and-black carpet moth
- 7636 W – Trichopteryx veritata
- 7637 B – Cladara limitaria, mottled gray carpet moth
- 7638 E – Cladara anguilineata, angle-lined carpet moth
- 7639 E – Cladara atroliturata, scribbler moth
- 7640 E – Lobophora nivigerata, powdered bigwing moth
- 7641 W – Lobophora montanata
- 7642 W – Lobophora simsata
- 7643 W – Lobophora magnoliatoidata
- 7644 W – Lobophora canavestita
- 7645 E – Heterophleps refusaria, three-patched bigwing moth
- 7646 – Heterophleps morensata
- 7647 E – Heterophleps triguttaria, three-spotted fillip moth
- 7648 E – Dyspteris abortivaria, badwing moth

== See also ==
- List of butterflies of North America
- List of Lepidoptera of Hawaii
- List of moths of Canada
- List of butterflies of Canada
