= Eumacrodes =

Scientific classification
- Kingdom: Animalia
- Phylum: Arthropoda
- Class: Insecta
- Order: Lepidoptera
- Family: Geometridae
- Genus: Eumacrodes; Warren, 1905
- Species: E. yponomeutaria

Binomial name
- Eumacrodes yponomeutaria (Guenée in Boisduval & Guenée, 1858)

Genus of moths

Eumacrodes is a monotypic moth genus in the family Geometridae described by Warren in 1905. Its only species, Eumacrodes yponomeutaria, first described by Achille Guenée in 1858, is found in the Caribbean and North America.

The MONA or Hodges number for Eumacrodes yponomeutaria is 7086.
