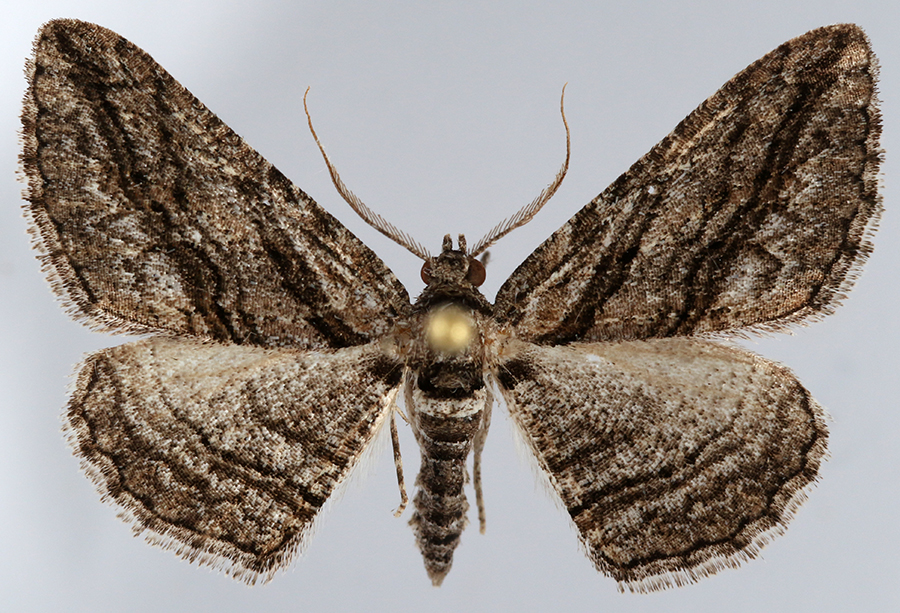

Scientific classification
- Kingdom: Animalia
- Phylum: Arthropoda
- Class: Insecta
- Order: Lepidoptera
- Family: Geometridae
- Genus: Hemimorina; McDunnough, 1941
- Species: H. dissociata

Binomial name
- Hemimorina dissociata McDunnough, 1941

= Hemimorina =

Genus of moths

Hemimorina is a monotypic moth genus in the family Geometridae. Its only species, Hemimorina dissociata, is found in North America. Both the genus and species were first described by James Halliday McDunnough in 1941.

The MONA or Hodges number for Hemimorina dissociata is 6775.
