= Ptychamalia =

Scientific classification
- Kingdom: Animalia
- Phylum: Arthropoda
- Clade: Pancrustacea
- Class: Insecta
- Order: Lepidoptera
- Family: Geometridae
- Genus: Ptychamalia; Prout, 1932
- Species: P. dorneraria

Binomial name
- Ptychamalia dorneraria (Barnes & McDunnough, 1913)

Genus of moths

Ptychamalia is a monotypic moth genus in the family Geometridae described by Prout in 1932. Its only species, Ptychamalia dorneraria, was first described by William Barnes and James Halliday McDunnough in 1913. It is found in North America.

The MONA or Hodges number for Ptychamalia dorneraria is 7131.
