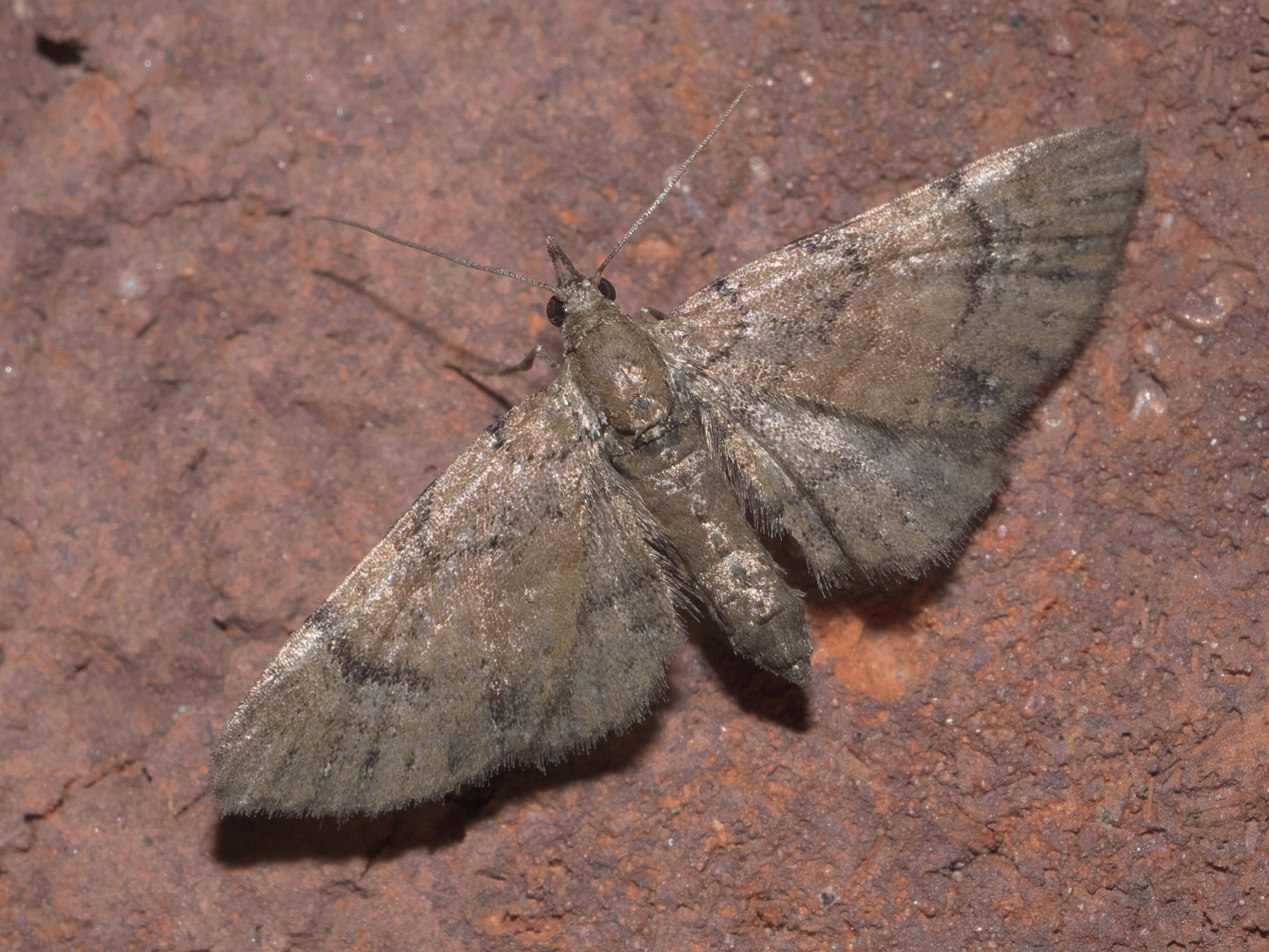

Scientific classification
- Domain: Eukaryota
- Kingdom: Animalia
- Phylum: Arthropoda
- Class: Insecta
- Order: Lepidoptera
- Family: Geometridae
- Genus: Eupithecia
- Species: E. peckorum

Binomial name
- Eupithecia peckorum Heitzman & Enns, 1977

= Eupithecia peckorum =

Species of moth

Eupithecia peckorum, or Peck's pug moth, is a moth in the family Geometridae. The species was first described by Roger L. Heitzman and Wilbur R. Enns in 1977. It is found in the United States in eastern Texas, Missouri, Mississippi and Louisiana.

The length of the forewings is 8.3-9.2 mm.

== Etymology ==
The species is named in honor of araneologist Dr. and Mrs. William B. Peck of Central Missouri State University, Warrensburg.
