= Eupithecia terrestrata =

Scientific classification
- Domain: Eukaryota
- Kingdom: Animalia
- Phylum: Arthropoda
- Class: Insecta
- Order: Lepidoptera
- Family: Geometridae
- Genus: Eupithecia
- Species: E. terrestrata

Binomial name
- Eupithecia terrestrata McDunnough, 1944

Species of moth

Eupithecia terrestrata is a moth in the family Geometridae. It is found in North America, including Arizona and New Mexico.

The wingspan is about 17 mm.
