= Eupithecia hohokamae =

Scientific classification
- Domain: Eukaryota
- Kingdom: Animalia
- Phylum: Arthropoda
- Class: Insecta
- Order: Lepidoptera
- Family: Geometridae
- Genus: Eupithecia
- Species: E. hohokamae

Binomial name
- Eupithecia hohokamae Rindge, 1963

Species of moth

Eupithecia hohokamae is a moth in the family Geometridae first described by Frederick H. Rindge in 1963. It is found in the United States in southern Arizona and California.

The length of the forewings is 11–12 mm for males and 10–12 mm for females. Adults are on wing in very early spring.

The larvae feed on the flowers of Arbutus pungens.
