= Eupithecia albigrisata =

Scientific classification
- Domain: Eukaryota
- Kingdom: Animalia
- Phylum: Arthropoda
- Class: Insecta
- Order: Lepidoptera
- Family: Geometridae
- Genus: Eupithecia
- Species: E. albigrisata

Binomial name
- Eupithecia albigrisata Pearsall, 1909

Species of moth

Eupithecia albigrisata is a moth in the family Geometridae. It is found in West Virginia and Georgia.
