= Eupithecia carneata =

Scientific classification
- Kingdom: Animalia
- Phylum: Arthropoda
- Clade: Pancrustacea
- Class: Insecta
- Order: Lepidoptera
- Family: Geometridae
- Genus: Eupithecia
- Species: E. carneata

Binomial name
- Eupithecia carneata McDunnough, 1946

Species of moth

Eupithecia carneata is a moth in the family Geometridae first described by James Halliday McDunnough in 1946. It is found in the US states of Utah and Arizona.

The wingspan is about 17 mm. Adults have been recorded on wing in August and September.
