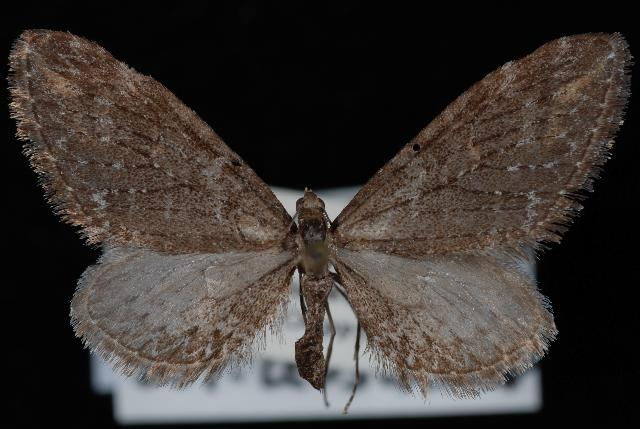

Scientific classification
- Domain: Eukaryota
- Kingdom: Animalia
- Phylum: Arthropoda
- Class: Insecta
- Order: Lepidoptera
- Family: Geometridae
- Genus: Eupithecia
- Species: E. scabrogata

Binomial name
- Eupithecia scabrogata Pearsall, 1912

Synonyms
- Eupithecia vistata Cassino & Swett 1922

= Eupithecia scabrogata =

Species of moth

Eupithecia scabrogata is a moth in the family Geometridae first described by Pearsall in 1912. It is found in western North America from British Columbia to California and Arizona.

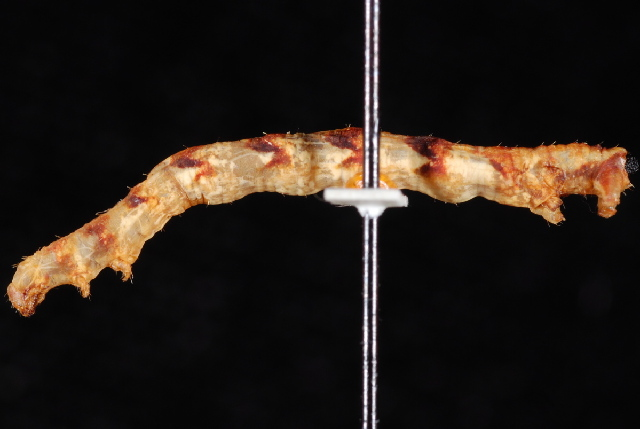
Larva

The wingspan is about 19 mm. Adults have been recorded on wing from November to March and in May, possibly representing a second generation.

The larvae feed on the flowers of Arbutus pungens.
