= Eupithecia zelmira =

Scientific classification
- Kingdom: Animalia
- Phylum: Arthropoda
- Class: Insecta
- Order: Lepidoptera
- Family: Geometridae
- Genus: Eupithecia
- Species: E. zelmira

Binomial name
- Eupithecia zelmira Swett & Cassino, 1920

Species of moth

Eupithecia zelmira is a moth in the family Geometridae first described by Louis W. Swett and Samuel E. Cassino in 1920. It is found in the US states of Oregon and California.

The wingspan is about 20 mm. Adults have been recorded on wing from February to July and in December.
