= Eupithecia sinuata =

Scientific classification
- Domain: Eukaryota
- Kingdom: Animalia
- Phylum: Arthropoda
- Class: Insecta
- Order: Lepidoptera
- Family: Geometridae
- Genus: Eupithecia
- Species: E. sinuata

Binomial name
- Eupithecia sinuata McDunnough, 1946

Species of moth

Eupithecia sinuata is a moth in the family Geometridae first described by James Halliday McDunnough in 1946. It is found in the US states of Arizona and New Mexico.

The wingspan is about 23 mm.
