= Eupithecia cestatoides =

Scientific classification
- Kingdom: Animalia
- Phylum: Arthropoda
- Class: Insecta
- Order: Lepidoptera
- Family: Geometridae
- Genus: Eupithecia
- Species: E. cestatoides

Binomial name
- Eupithecia cestatoides McDunnough, 1949

Species of moth

Eupithecia cestatoides is a moth in the family Geometridae first described by James Halliday McDunnough in 1949. It is found in the US state of California.

The wingspan is about 21 mm. Adults have been recorded on wing from March to June.
