= Eupithecia cocoata =

Scientific classification
- Domain: Eukaryota
- Kingdom: Animalia
- Phylum: Arthropoda
- Class: Insecta
- Order: Lepidoptera
- Family: Geometridae
- Genus: Eupithecia
- Species: E. cocoata

Binomial name
- Eupithecia cocoata Pearsall, 1908

Species of moth

Eupithecia cocoata is a moth in the family Geometridae. It is found in North America, with records from Maryland, Iowa and Washington.

The length of the forewings is 11 mm. Adults have been recorded on wing in May and July.
