= Eupithecia appendiculata =

Scientific classification
- Domain: Eukaryota
- Kingdom: Animalia
- Phylum: Arthropoda
- Class: Insecta
- Order: Lepidoptera
- Family: Geometridae
- Genus: Eupithecia
- Species: E. appendiculata

Binomial name
- Eupithecia appendiculata McDunnough, 1946

Species of moth

Eupithecia appendiculata is a moth in the family Geometridae first described by James Halliday McDunnough in 1946. It is found in western North America, including Utah, Colorado, Idaho and California, as well as Baja California.

The wingspan is about 15 mm.
