= Scopula benitaria =

Scientific classification
- Domain: Eukaryota
- Kingdom: Animalia
- Phylum: Arthropoda
- Class: Insecta
- Order: Lepidoptera
- Family: Geometridae
- Genus: Scopula
- Species: S. benitaria

Binomial name
- Scopula benitaria (Barnes & McDunnough, 1913)

Synonyms
- Leptomeris benitaria Barnes & McDunnough, 1913

Species of geometer moth in subfamily Sterrhinae

Scopula benitaria is a moth of the family Geometridae first described by William Barnes and James Halliday McDunnough in 1913. It is found in North America, including New Mexico and Texas.

The wingspan is 12–14 millimetres (0.47–0.55 in).
