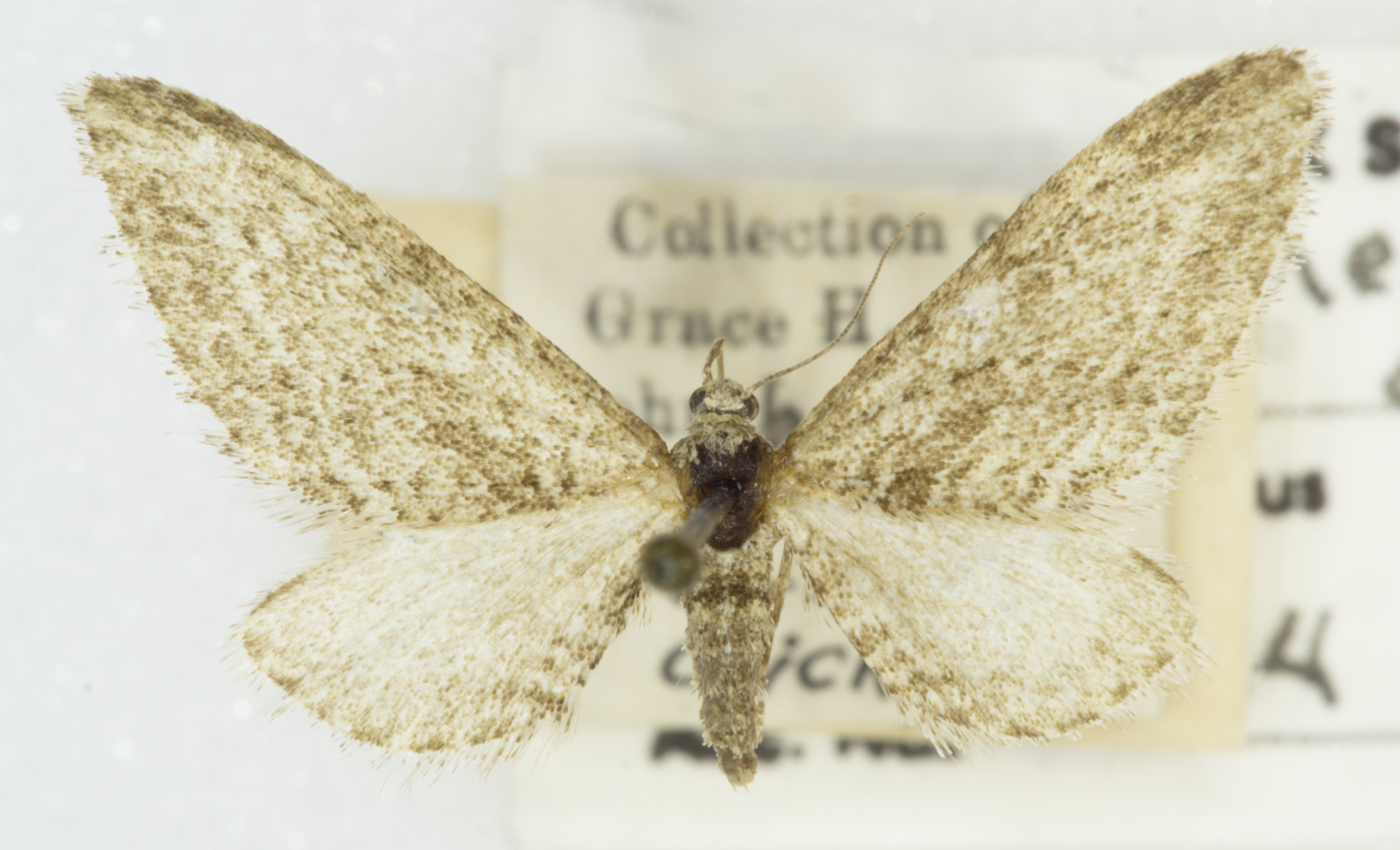
- "Eupithecia deserticola" from California, photo by Robb Hannawacker

Scientific classification
- Domain: Eukaryota
- Kingdom: Animalia
- Phylum: Arthropoda
- Class: Insecta
- Order: Lepidoptera
- Family: Geometridae
- Genus: Eupithecia
- Species: E. zekiyae

Binomial name
- Eupithecia zekiyae Koçak, 1986

Synonyms
- Eupithecia deserticola McDunnough, 1946 (preocc. Turati, 1934); Eupithecia jamesi Ferris & Mironov, 2007 (Superfluous replacement name)

= Eupithecia zekiyae =

Species of moth

Eupithecia zekiyae is a species of moth in the family Geometridae first described by McDunnough (1946), although the authorship of the currently valid species name is Koçak, 1986 (see taxonomy).

== Description ==
The wingspan is about 22–23 mm. Adults have been recorded on wing from January to March.

== Range ==
Moths of this family are found in the desert regions of the south-western United States, including Arizona, Nevada and California.

== Taxonomy ==
The species was initially described in Lepidoptera: Geometridae: Eupitheciini as Eupithecia deserticola McDunnough 1946. The name entered into some electronic databases in this combination. However, due to earlier use by Eupithecia deserticola Turati (1934) as a different species from Libya, the name combination was then considered preoccupied for nomenclature. This led Clifford D. Ferris and Vladimir G. Mironov (2007) establish Eupithecia jamesi Ferris & Mironov, 2007 as a replacement name making E. deserticola McDunnough a junior secondary homonym. However, Kemel & Koçak (2016) clarify that a replacement name had already been previously published as Eupithecia zekiyae Koçak, 1986. They treated Eupithecia jamesi Ferris & Mironov, 2007 as junior objective synonym of E. zekiyae Koçak, 1986, but can be more simply viewed as a superfluous replacement name. However, as of Aug. 2023, some websites continue to report the species under E. jamesi.
