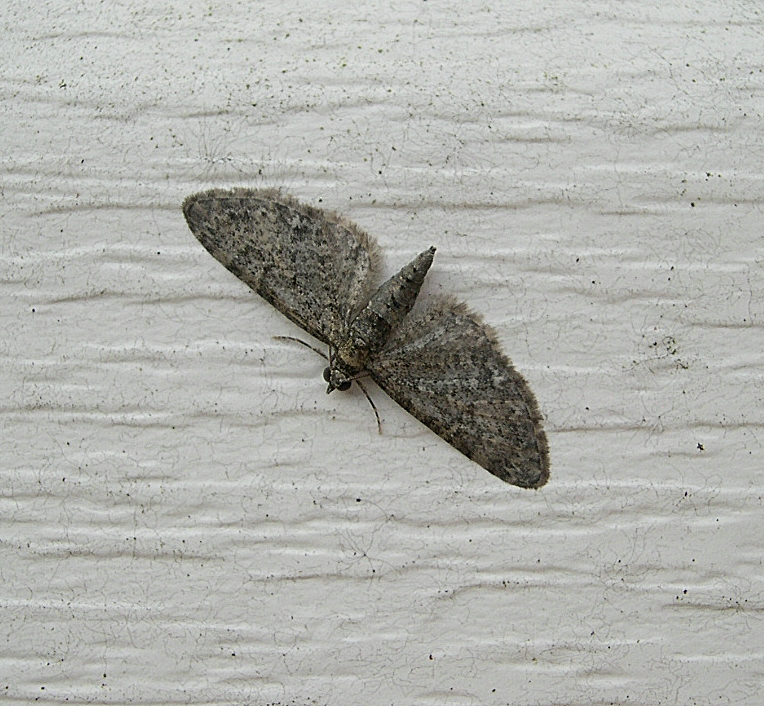

Scientific classification
- Domain: Eukaryota
- Kingdom: Animalia
- Phylum: Arthropoda
- Class: Insecta
- Order: Lepidoptera
- Family: Geometridae
- Genus: Eupithecia
- Species: E. jejunata

Binomial name
- Eupithecia jejunata McDunnough, 1949

= Eupithecia jejunata =

Species of moth

Eupithecia jejunata is a moth in the family Geometridae. It is found in the United States, from eastern Texas, north into Arkansas and Missouri, east through Louisiana and Mississippi to Florida and north to coastal North Carolina.

The forewings are gray with an indistinct pattern. Adults are on wing from February to mid-May. There can be a partial second generation.
