= Hellinsia pan =

Scientific classification
- Domain: Eukaryota
- Kingdom: Animalia
- Phylum: Arthropoda
- Class: Insecta
- Order: Lepidoptera
- Family: Pterophoridae
- Genus: Hellinsia
- Species: H. pan

Binomial name
- Hellinsia pan (Barnes & Lindsey, 1921)

Synonyms
- Oidaematophorus pan Barnes & Lindsey, 1921

Species of plume moth

Hellinsia pan is a moth of the family Pterophoridae that can be found in the U.S. states of California and Arizona. The species was first described by William Barnes and Arthur Ward Lindsey in 1921.

The wingspan is 17–24 millimetres (0.67–0.94 in). The head, body and legs white. The forewings are white with gray-brown irroration. There is a black costal dash over the base of the cleft and is usually separated from the discal area by a clear white subcostal line. There is a small spot before the cleft. The fringes are contrastingly dark but with extensive white areas. The hindwings are whitish to light gray.

Adults have been recorded in March, April and May.
