= Eupithecia chlorofasciata =

Scientific classification
- Domain: Eukaryota
- Kingdom: Animalia
- Phylum: Arthropoda
- Class: Insecta
- Order: Lepidoptera
- Family: Geometridae
- Genus: Eupithecia
- Species: E. chlorofasciata

Binomial name
- Eupithecia chlorofasciata Dietze, 1872

Species of moth

Eupithecia chlorofasciata is a moth in the family Geometridae. It is found in North America, including Kentucky.
