= Eupithecia uinta =

Scientific classification
- Domain: Eukaryota
- Kingdom: Animalia
- Phylum: Arthropoda
- Class: Insecta
- Order: Lepidoptera
- Family: Geometridae
- Genus: Eupithecia
- Species: E. uinta

Binomial name
- Eupithecia uinta Rindge, 1956

Species of moth

Eupithecia uinta is a moth in the family Geometridae. It is found in Colorado.

The wingspan is 19–22 mm for males and 18–21 mm for females. Adults have been recorded on wing in June.
