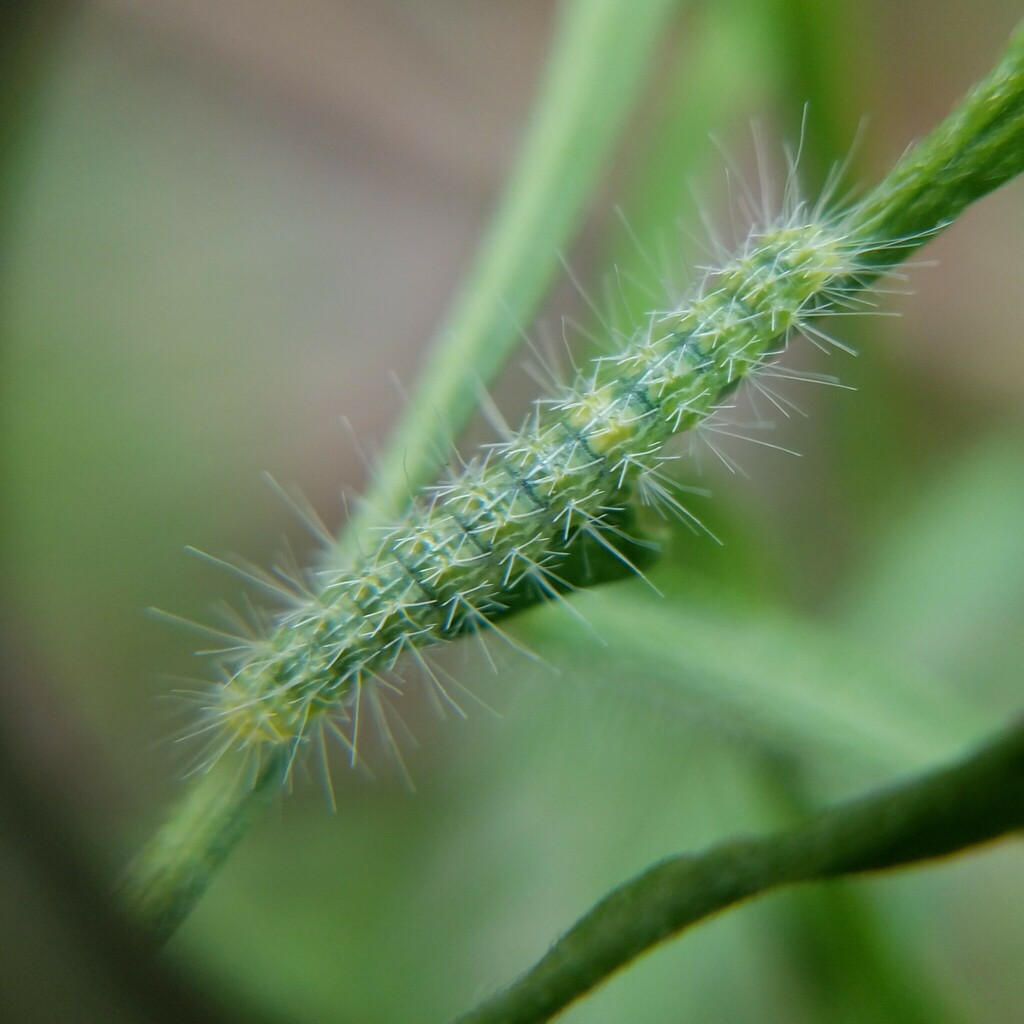

Scientific classification
- Domain: Eukaryota
- Kingdom: Animalia
- Phylum: Arthropoda
- Class: Insecta
- Order: Lepidoptera
- Family: Pterophoridae
- Genus: Hellinsia
- Species: H. habecki

Binomial name
- Hellinsia habecki Matthews, 2010

= Hellinsia habecki =

Species of plume moth

Hellinsia habecki is a moth of the family Pterophoridae. It is found in Florida, including the type location of Liberty County.
