= Eupithecia vicksburgi =

Scientific classification
- Domain: Eukaryota
- Kingdom: Animalia
- Phylum: Arthropoda
- Class: Insecta
- Order: Lepidoptera
- Family: Geometridae
- Genus: Eupithecia
- Species: E. vicksburgi

Binomial name
- Eupithecia vicksburgi Rindge, 1985

Species of insect

Eupithecia vicksburgi is a moth in the family Geometridae first described by Frederick H. Rindge in 1985. It is found in the US state of Mississippi.

The length of the forewings is 8.5-9.5 mm for males and 7.5–8 mm for females. Adults are on wing from March to April and again from September to October.

== Etymology ==
The specific name is based on the type locality.
