= Eupithecia broui =

Scientific classification
- Domain: Eukaryota
- Kingdom: Animalia
- Phylum: Arthropoda
- Class: Insecta
- Order: Lepidoptera
- Family: Geometridae
- Genus: Eupithecia
- Species: E. broui

Binomial name
- Eupithecia broui Rindge, 1985

Species of moth

Eupithecia broui is a moth in the family Geometridae first described by Frederick H. Rindge in 1985. It is found in the US states of Louisiana, Mississippi and coastal North Carolina.

The length of the forewings is 9.5–10.5 mm for males and 9–10 mm for females. Adults are on wing in February, March and April.

== Etymology ==
The species is named in honor of Vernon A. Brou, a collector of Louisiana Lepidoptera.
