= Eupithecia woodgatata =

Scientific classification
- Domain: Eukaryota
- Kingdom: Animalia
- Phylum: Arthropoda
- Class: Insecta
- Order: Lepidoptera
- Family: Geometridae
- Genus: Eupithecia
- Species: E. woodgatata

Binomial name
- Eupithecia woodgatata (Cassino & Swett, 1923)

Synonyms
- Prorella woodgatata Cassino & Swett, 1923

Species of moth

Eupithecia woodgatata is a moth in the family Geometridae first described by Samuel E. Cassino and Louis W. Swett in 1923. It is found in the US states of Arizona, New Mexico and California.

The wingspan is about 17 mm. Adults have been recorded on wing in August.
