= Hellinsia rigidus =

Scientific classification
- Domain: Eukaryota
- Kingdom: Animalia
- Phylum: Arthropoda
- Class: Insecta
- Order: Lepidoptera
- Family: Pterophoridae
- Genus: Hellinsia
- Species: H. rigidus

Binomial name
- Hellinsia rigidus (McDunnough, 1938)

Synonyms
- Oidaematophorus rigidus McDunnough, 1938

Species of plume moth

Hellinsia rigidus is a moth of the family Pterophoridae. It is found in North America, including California.
