= Eupithecia owenata =

Scientific classification
- Domain: Eukaryota
- Kingdom: Animalia
- Phylum: Arthropoda
- Class: Insecta
- Order: Lepidoptera
- Family: Geometridae
- Genus: Eupithecia
- Species: E. owenata

Binomial name
- Eupithecia owenata McDunnough, 1944

Species of moth

Eupithecia owenata is a moth in the family Geometridae first described by James Halliday McDunnough in 1944. It is found in the southern-western United States, including New Mexico, Arizona and California.

The wingspan is about 23 mm. Adults have been recorded on wing from June to August.
