= Eupithecia alpinata =

Scientific classification
- Domain: Eukaryota
- Kingdom: Animalia
- Phylum: Arthropoda
- Class: Insecta
- Order: Lepidoptera
- Family: Geometridae
- Genus: Eupithecia
- Species: E. alpinata

Binomial name
- Eupithecia alpinata Cassino, 1927

Species of moth

Eupithecia alpinata is a moth in the family Geometridae first described by Samuel E. Cassino in 1927. It is found in the US states of Texas and Arizona.

The wingspan is about 17 mm. Adults have been recorded on wing from March to May.
