= Eupithecia shirleyata =

Scientific classification
- Domain: Eukaryota
- Kingdom: Animalia
- Phylum: Arthropoda
- Class: Insecta
- Order: Lepidoptera
- Family: Geometridae
- Genus: Eupithecia
- Species: E. shirleyata

Binomial name
- Eupithecia shirleyata Cassino & Swett, 1922

Species of moth

Eupithecia shirleyata is a moth in the family Geometridae first described by Samuel E. Cassino and Louis W. Swett in 1922. It is found in the US in southern California and Arizona.

The wingspan is about 23 mm. Adults are on wing from the end of November to late March or even early April.
