= Eupithecia subapicata =

Scientific classification
- Kingdom: Animalia
- Phylum: Arthropoda
- Class: Insecta
- Order: Lepidoptera
- Family: Geometridae
- Genus: Eupithecia
- Species: E. subapicata

Binomial name
- Eupithecia subapicata Guenée, 1857

Synonyms
- Chesias occidentaliata Packard, 1871

Species of moth

Eupithecia subapicata is a moth in the family Geometridae first described by Achille Guenée in 1857. It is found in the western United States from California through Oregon to Washington.

The wingspan is about 22–26 mm. Adults have been recorded on wing from January to July.
