= Eupithecia pertusata =

Scientific classification
- Kingdom: Animalia
- Phylum: Arthropoda
- Clade: Pancrustacea
- Class: Insecta
- Order: Lepidoptera
- Family: Geometridae
- Genus: Eupithecia
- Species: E. pertusata

Binomial name
- Eupithecia pertusata McDunnough, 1938

Species of moth

Eupithecia pertusata is a moth in the family Geometridae. It is found the United States in south-western Texas, Arizona and New Mexico.

The wingspan is about 17 mm.
