= Eupithecia joanata =

Scientific classification
- Domain: Eukaryota
- Kingdom: Animalia
- Phylum: Arthropoda
- Class: Insecta
- Order: Lepidoptera
- Family: Geometridae
- Genus: Eupithecia
- Species: E. joanata

Binomial name
- Eupithecia joanata Cassino & Swett, 1922

Synonyms
- Eupithecia balboata Cassino & Swett, 1925

Species of moth

Eupithecia joanata is a moth in the family Geometridae first described by Samuel E. Cassino and Louis W. Swett in 1922. It is found in southern California, United States.

The wingspan is about 17 mm. Adults have been recorded on wing from December to March.
