= Eupithecia rindgei =

Scientific classification
- Kingdom: Animalia
- Phylum: Arthropoda
- Clade: Pancrustacea
- Class: Insecta
- Order: Lepidoptera
- Family: Geometridae
- Genus: Eupithecia
- Species: E. rindgei

Binomial name
- Eupithecia rindgei McDunnough, 1949

Synonyms
- Eupithecia balboata Cassino & Swett, 1925

Species of insect

Eupithecia rindgei is a moth in the family Geometridae, first described by James Halliday McDunnough in 1949. It is found in the U.S. state of California.

The wingspan is about 15 mm. Adults have been recorded on wing from May to July.
