= Eupithecia neomexicana =

Scientific classification
- Kingdom: Animalia
- Phylum: Arthropoda
- Class: Insecta
- Order: Lepidoptera
- Family: Geometridae
- Genus: Eupithecia
- Species: E. neomexicana

Binomial name
- Eupithecia neomexicana McDunnough, 1946

Species of moth

Eupithecia neomexicana is a moth in the family Geometridae first described by James Halliday McDunnough in 1946. It is found in the United States in western New Mexico and Arizona.

The wingspan is about 15–17 mm. Adults have been recorded on wing from late August to early September.
