= Eupithecia adequata =

Scientific classification
- Domain: Eukaryota
- Kingdom: Animalia
- Phylum: Arthropoda
- Class: Insecta
- Order: Lepidoptera
- Family: Geometridae
- Genus: Eupithecia
- Species: E. adequata

Binomial name
- Eupithecia adequata Pearsall, 1910

Species of moth

Eupithecia adequata is a moth in the family Geometridae first described by Pearsall in 1910. It is found in the United States from Utah and Colorado through Nevada to California and Arizona.

The wingspan is about 21 mm. Adults have been recorded on wing from March to May and in July.
