= Scopula eburneata =

Scientific classification
- Kingdom: Animalia
- Phylum: Arthropoda
- Class: Insecta
- Order: Lepidoptera
- Family: Geometridae
- Genus: Scopula
- Species: S. eburneata

Binomial name
- Scopula eburneata (Guenée, [1858])

Synonyms
- Acidalia eburneata Guenee, 1857; Emmiltis blandula Warren, 1906; Acidalia subsignaria Walker, 1861

Species of geometer moth in subfamily Sterrhinae

Scopula eburneata is a moth of the family Geometridae. It is found in Brazil, French Guiana, Jamaica and southern North America, including Texas.

The wingspan is 12–14 mm.
