= Eupithecia vitreotata =

Scientific classification
- Kingdom: Animalia
- Phylum: Arthropoda
- Class: Insecta
- Order: Lepidoptera
- Family: Geometridae
- Genus: Eupithecia
- Species: E. vitreotata

Binomial name
- Eupithecia vitreotata Cassino, 1927

Species of moth

Eupithecia vitreotata is a moth in the family Geometridae first described by Samuel E. Cassino in 1927. It is found in the US states of Colorado, Arizona and California.

The wingspan is about 17 mm. Adults have been recorded on wing from February to April.
