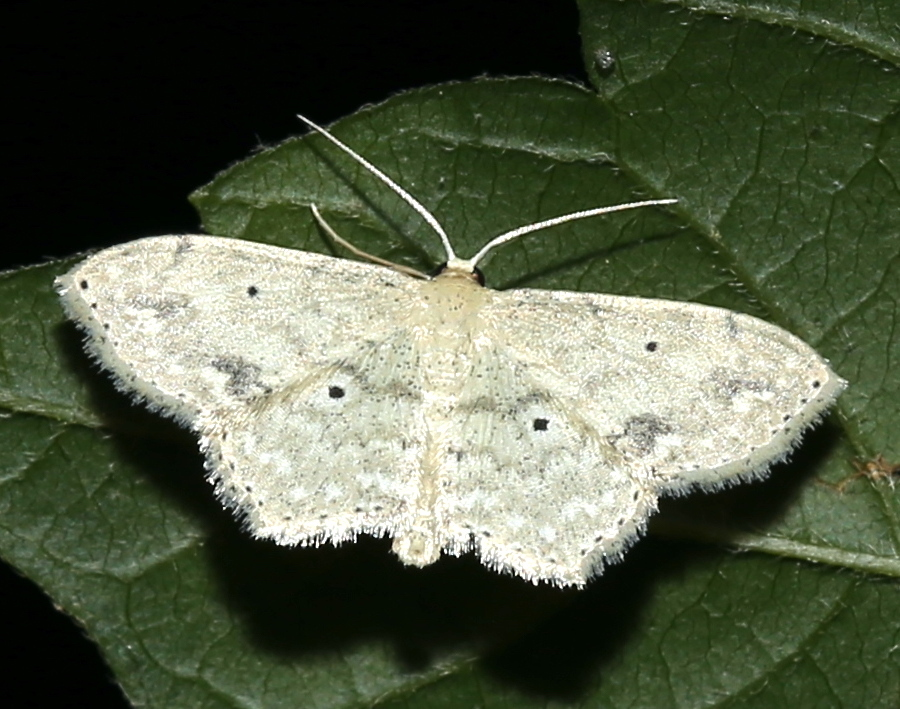

Scientific classification
- Kingdom: Animalia
- Phylum: Arthropoda
- Class: Insecta
- Order: Lepidoptera
- Family: Geometridae
- Genus: Scopula
- Species: S. compensata

Binomial name
- Scopula compensata (Walker, 1861)

Synonyms
- Acidalia compensata Walker, 1861; Acidalia obluridata Hulst, 1887

= Scopula compensata =

Species of geometer moth in subfamily Sterrhinae

Scopula compensata, the small frosted wave, is a moth of the family Geometridae. It was described by Francis Walker in 1861. It is found in southeastern North America, including Alabama, Florida, Georgia and South Carolina.

The wingspan is about 15 millimetres (0.59 in).
