= Eupithecia quakerata =

Scientific classification
- Domain: Eukaryota
- Kingdom: Animalia
- Phylum: Arthropoda
- Class: Insecta
- Order: Lepidoptera
- Family: Geometridae
- Genus: Eupithecia
- Species: E. quakerata

Binomial name
- Eupithecia quakerata Pearsall, 1909

Synonyms
- Eupithecia apacheata Cassino, 1927; Eupithecia conglomerata McDunnough, 1946

Species of moth

Eupithecia quakerata is a moth in the family Geometridae first described by Pearsall in 1909. It is found in the US states of Colorado, Utah, New Mexico, Arizona and California.

The Eupithecia quakerata has a wingspan of approximately 18mm. The forewings are brownish to deep gray in color.
