= Eupithecia nimbosa =

Scientific classification
- Kingdom: Animalia
- Phylum: Arthropoda
- Clade: Pancrustacea
- Class: Insecta
- Order: Lepidoptera
- Family: Geometridae
- Genus: Eupithecia
- Species: E. nimbosa

Binomial name
- Eupithecia nimbosa (Hulst, 1896)

Synonyms
- Tephroclystia nimbosa Hulst, 1896; Tephroclystia plenoscripta Hulst, 1900; Eupithecia bindata Pearsall, 1910

Species of moth

Eupithecia nimbosa is a moth in the family Geometridae first described by George Duryea Hulst in 1896. It is widespread in the Rocky Mountains, from Arizona to the Canada–US border.

The wingspan is 21–22 mm.

== Subspecies ==
- Eupithecia nimbosa nimbosa
- Eupithecia nimbosa bindata Pearsall, 1910 (Washington, California)
