= Scopula lautaria =

Scientific classification
- Domain: Eukaryota
- Kingdom: Animalia
- Phylum: Arthropoda
- Class: Insecta
- Order: Lepidoptera
- Family: Geometridae
- Genus: Scopula
- Species: S. lautaria

Binomial name
- Scopula lautaria (Hübner, [1831])

Synonyms
- Craspedia lautaria Hübner 1831; Acidalia minutularia Hulst, 1880; Acidalia myrmidonata Guenée, 1857

Species of geometer moth in subfamily Sterrhinae

Scopula lautaria, the small frosted wave moth, is a moth of the family Geometridae. It was described by Jacob Hübner in 1831. It is found in North America, including Florida, Georgia, Mississippi, South Carolina and Texas.

The wingspan is about 15 millimetres (0.59 in).
