= Eupithecia cazieri =

Scientific classification
- Domain: Eukaryota
- Kingdom: Animalia
- Phylum: Arthropoda
- Class: Insecta
- Order: Lepidoptera
- Family: Geometridae
- Genus: Eupithecia
- Species: E. cazieri

Binomial name
- Eupithecia cazieri Kirkwood, 1961

Species of moth

Eupithecia cazieri is a moth in the family Geometridae. It is found in Arizona.

The wingspan is about 14 mm. Adults have been recorded on wing in March.

== Etymology ==
The species is named in honor of Dr. Mont A. Cazier, Director of the Southwestern Research Station.
