= Eupithecia pinata =

Scientific classification
- Domain: Eukaryota
- Kingdom: Animalia
- Phylum: Arthropoda
- Class: Insecta
- Order: Lepidoptera
- Family: Geometridae
- Genus: Eupithecia
- Species: E. pinata

Binomial name
- Eupithecia pinata Cassino, 1925

Species of moth

Eupithecia pinata is a moth of the family Geometridae. It is found in North America (including Arizona). It was described by Samuel E. Cassino in 1925.
