= Eupithecia plumasata =

Scientific classification
- Domain: Eukaryota
- Kingdom: Animalia
- Phylum: Arthropoda
- Class: Insecta
- Order: Lepidoptera
- Family: Geometridae
- Genus: Eupithecia
- Species: E. plumasata

Binomial name
- Eupithecia plumasata McDunnough, 1946

Species of moth

Eupithecia plumasata is a moth in the family Geometridae first described by James Halliday McDunnough in 1946. It is found in the US state of California.

The wingspan is about 20 mm. The forewings are smoky gray. Adults have been recorded on wing from May to August and in December.
