= Eupithecia fredericki =

Scientific classification
- Domain: Eukaryota
- Kingdom: Animalia
- Phylum: Arthropoda
- Class: Insecta
- Order: Lepidoptera
- Family: Geometridae
- Genus: Eupithecia
- Species: E. fredericki

Binomial name
- Eupithecia fredericki Knudson, 1985

Species of moth

Eupithecia fredericki is a moth in the family Geometridae. It is found in North America, including Texas and Wisconsin.

The length of the forewings is about 7.5 mm. Adults have been recorded on wing in May and August.
