= Eupithecia tricolorata =

Scientific classification
- Domain: Eukaryota
- Kingdom: Animalia
- Phylum: Arthropoda
- Class: Insecta
- Order: Lepidoptera
- Family: Geometridae
- Genus: Eupithecia
- Species: E. tricolorata

Binomial name
- Eupithecia tricolorata Cassino, 1927

Species of moth

Eupithecia tricolorata is a moth in the family Geometridae first described by Samuel E. Cassino in 1927. It is found in the United States in southern Arizona.

The wingspan is about 17 mm. Adults have been recorded on wing in October.
