= Eupithecia cognizata =

Scientific classification
- Domain: Eukaryota
- Kingdom: Animalia
- Phylum: Arthropoda
- Class: Insecta
- Order: Lepidoptera
- Family: Geometridae
- Genus: Eupithecia
- Species: E. cognizata

Binomial name
- Eupithecia cognizata Pearsall, 1910

Species of moth

Eupithecia cognizata is a moth in the family Geometridae. It is found in central coastal California.

Adults have been recorded on the wing from January to March and in November.
