= Eupithecia phyllisae =

Scientific classification
- Domain: Eukaryota
- Kingdom: Animalia
- Phylum: Arthropoda
- Class: Insecta
- Order: Lepidoptera
- Family: Geometridae
- Genus: Eupithecia
- Species: E. phyllisae

Binomial name
- Eupithecia phyllisae Rindge, 1963

Species of moth

Eupithecia phyllisae is a moth in the family Geometridae first described by Rindge in 1963. It is found in the US states of New Mexico and Arizona.

The length of the forewings is 7-8.5 mm for males and 7–9 mm for females.

== Etymology ==
The species is named in honor of the wife of the author, Phyllis Rindge.
