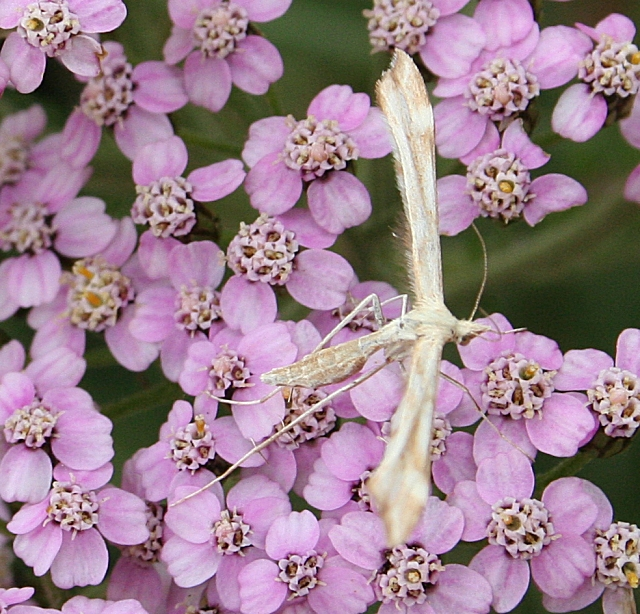
- Plume Moth on Yarrow Flower

Scientific classification
- Domain: Eukaryota
- Kingdom: Animalia
- Phylum: Arthropoda
- Class: Insecta
- Order: Lepidoptera
- Family: Pterophoridae
- Genus: Hellinsia
- Species: H. arion

Binomial name
- Hellinsia arion (Barnes & Lindsey, 1921)

Synonyms
- Oidaematophorus arion Barnes & Lindsey, 1921

= Hellinsia arion =

Species of plume moth

Hellinsia arion is a moth of the family Pterophoridae that can be found in North America, including Alberta and Arizona. The species was first described by William Barnes and Arthur Ward Lindsey in 1921.

The wingspan is about 22.5 millimetres (0.89 in). The head, thorax and abdomen are evenly dotted with brownish grey and white scales. There are single blackish dorsal dots in hind margins of the segments of the abdomen. The antennae have grey-brown and white scales, finely banded. The costal margin of the forewings is dark brownish grey, lighter outward with a heavy spot beyond the base of the cleft. The remainder of the wing is lighter brownish grey with white scales. There is a small dark dot in the cell and a larger one before the cleft. A few scattered dark scales are found near the inner margin. The fringes are darker than the wing and darkest in the cleft, cut by a few white hairs and tufts especially on the outer margin of the second lobe. The hindwings and fringes are light brownish grey.
