= Eupithecia subcolorata =

Scientific classification
- Kingdom: Animalia
- Phylum: Arthropoda
- Class: Insecta
- Order: Lepidoptera
- Family: Geometridae
- Genus: Eupithecia
- Species: E. subcolorata

Binomial name
- Eupithecia subcolorata (Hulst, 1898)

Synonyms
- Tephroclystia subcolorata Hulst, 1898

Species of moth

Eupithecia subcolorata is a moth in the family Geometridae first described by George Duryea Hulst in 1898. It is found in western North America, from British Columbia south to Arizona and New Mexico.

The wingspan is about 22 mm. Adults are on wing in late spring and early summer.

The larvae feed on the foliage of Vaccinium species.
