= Letispe =

Scientific classification
- Kingdom: Animalia
- Phylum: Arthropoda
- Class: Insecta
- Order: Lepidoptera
- Family: Geometridae
- Genus: Letispe; Ferguson, 2008
- Species: L. metanemaria

Binomial name
- Letispe metanemaria (Hulst, 1887)

Genus of moths

Letispe is a monotypic moth genus in the family Geometridae described by Alexander Douglas Campbell Ferguson in 2008. Its one described species, Letispe metanemaria, described by George Duryea Hulst in 1887, is found in southwest North America in Arizona, California, Sonora and Baja California.
