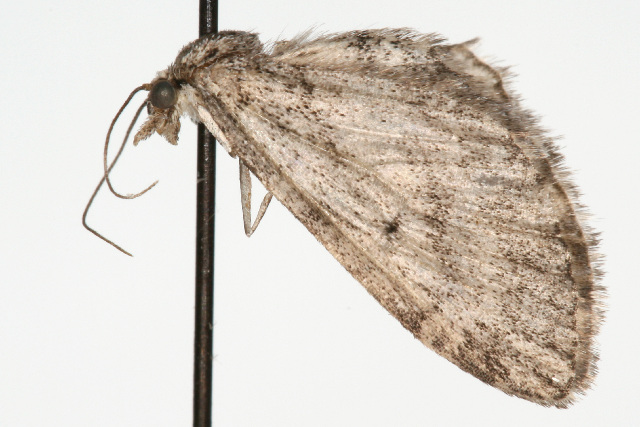

Scientific classification
- Domain: Eukaryota
- Kingdom: Animalia
- Phylum: Arthropoda
- Class: Insecta
- Order: Lepidoptera
- Family: Geometridae
- Genus: Eupithecia
- Species: E. castellata

Binomial name
- Eupithecia castellata McDunnough, 1944

= Eupithecia castellata =

Species of moth

Eupithecia castellata is a moth in the family Geometridae. It is found from California and Nevada to Washington.

The wingspan is 21 mm.
