= Eupithecia litoris =

Scientific classification
- Kingdom: Animalia
- Phylum: Arthropoda
- Class: Insecta
- Order: Lepidoptera
- Family: Geometridae
- Genus: Eupithecia
- Species: E. litoris

Binomial name
- Eupithecia litoris McDunnough, 1946

Species of moth

Eupithecia litoris is a moth in the family Geometridae first described by James Halliday McDunnough in 1946. It is found in the US state of California.

Adults are light grayish or cream in color.
