= Eupithecia catalinata =

Scientific classification
- Domain: Eukaryota
- Kingdom: Animalia
- Phylum: Arthropoda
- Class: Insecta
- Order: Lepidoptera
- Family: Geometridae
- Genus: Eupithecia
- Species: E. catalinata

Binomial name
- Eupithecia catalinata McDunnough, 1944

Species of moth

Eupithecia catalinata is a moth in the family Geometridae first described by James Halliday McDunnough in 1944. It is found in the southern United States, including Utah, Arizona and New Mexico.

The wingspan is about 23 mm. Adults have been recorded on wing in July and August.
