= Eupithecia monacheata =

Scientific classification
- Domain: Eukaryota
- Kingdom: Animalia
- Phylum: Arthropoda
- Class: Insecta
- Order: Lepidoptera
- Family: Geometridae
- Genus: Eupithecia
- Species: E. monacheata

Binomial name
- Eupithecia monacheata Cassino & Swett, 1922

Synonyms
- Eupithecia carolata McDunnough, 1944

Species of moth

Eupithecia monacheata is a moth in the family Geometridae. It is found in North America, including Arizona and California.
