= Eupithecia pretansata =

Scientific classification
- Domain: Eukaryota
- Kingdom: Animalia
- Phylum: Arthropoda
- Class: Insecta
- Order: Lepidoptera
- Family: Geometridae
- Genus: Eupithecia
- Species: E. pretansata

Binomial name
- Eupithecia pretansata Grossbeck, 1908

Species of moth

Eupithecia pretansata is a moth in the family Geometridae. It is found in Arizona (the Huachuca Mountains) and Chihuahua in Mexico.
