= Eupithecia persimulata =

Scientific classification
- Domain: Eukaryota
- Kingdom: Animalia
- Phylum: Arthropoda
- Class: Insecta
- Order: Lepidoptera
- Family: Geometridae
- Genus: Eupithecia
- Species: E. persimulata

Binomial name
- Eupithecia persimulata McDunnough, 1938

Species of moth

Eupithecia persimulata is a moth in the family Geometridae. It is found in south-western Texas and Arizona.

The wingspan is about 18 mm. Adults have been recorded on wing in August.
