= Eupithecia segregata =

Scientific classification
- Domain: Eukaryota
- Kingdom: Animalia
- Phylum: Arthropoda
- Class: Insecta
- Order: Lepidoptera
- Family: Geometridae
- Genus: Eupithecia
- Species: E. segregata

Binomial name
- Eupithecia segregata Pearsall, 1910

Synonyms
- Eupithecia bonita Cassino & Swett, 1925

Species of moth

Eupithecia segregata is a moth in the family Geometridae first described by Pearsall in 1910. It is found in the US states of Oregon, Arizona and California.

The wingspan is about 17 mm. It is a variable species. In coastal regions, adults are on wing from late February to April, but at higher altitudes in the Sierras, the flight time lasts till June.
