= Eupithecia flavigutta =

Scientific classification
- Domain: Eukaryota
- Kingdom: Animalia
- Phylum: Arthropoda
- Class: Insecta
- Order: Lepidoptera
- Family: Geometridae
- Genus: Eupithecia
- Species: E. flavigutta

Binomial name
- Eupithecia flavigutta (Hulst, 1896)

Synonyms
- Tephroclystia flavigutta Hulst, 1896

Species of moth

Eupithecia flavigutta is a moth in the family Geometridae first described by George Duryea Hulst in 1896. It is found in the United States in Colorado and montane forest areas in eastern Arizona and south-western New Mexico.

The wingspan is 16–20 mm.
