= Eupithecia albimontanata =

Scientific classification
- Domain: Eukaryota
- Kingdom: Animalia
- Phylum: Arthropoda
- Class: Insecta
- Order: Lepidoptera
- Family: Geometridae
- Genus: Eupithecia
- Species: E. albimontanata

Binomial name
- Eupithecia albimontanata McDunnough, 1940

Species of moth

Eupithecia albimontanata is a moth in the family Geometridae. It is found in North America, including Arizona, California, Colorado and Utah.

The wingspan is about 19 mm.
