= Eupithecia piccata =

Scientific classification
- Domain: Eukaryota
- Kingdom: Animalia
- Phylum: Arthropoda
- Class: Insecta
- Order: Lepidoptera
- Family: Geometridae
- Genus: Eupithecia
- Species: E. piccata

Binomial name
- Eupithecia piccata Pearsall, 1910

Species of moth

Eupithecia piccata is a moth in the family Geometridae first described by Pearsall in 1910. It is found in the US states of Arizona and New Mexico.

The wingspan is about 15 mm. Adults have smoky sprinkling over both wings.
