= Eupithecia exudata =

Scientific classification
- Kingdom: Animalia
- Phylum: Arthropoda
- Clade: Pancrustacea
- Class: Insecta
- Order: Lepidoptera
- Family: Geometridae
- Genus: Eupithecia
- Species: E. exudata

Binomial name
- Eupithecia exudata Pearsall, 1909

Species of moth

Eupithecia exudata is a moth in the family Geometridae first described by Pearsall in 1909. It is found in the eastern United States, including Pennsylvania, Indiana, Kentucky and Ohio.

The wingspan is about 15–16 mm. Adults are on wing in early spring.
