= Eupithecia gilata =

Scientific classification
- Domain: Eukaryota
- Kingdom: Animalia
- Phylum: Arthropoda
- Class: Insecta
- Order: Lepidoptera
- Family: Geometridae
- Genus: Eupithecia
- Species: E. gilata

Binomial name
- Eupithecia gilata Cassino, 1925

Species of moth

Eupithecia gilata is a moth in the family Geometridae first described by Samuel E. Cassino in 1925. It is found in the US states of Arizona and California.

The wingspan is about 19 mm. Adults have been recorded on wing from February to May.
