= Eupithecia sierrae =

Scientific classification
- Domain: Eukaryota
- Kingdom: Animalia
- Phylum: Arthropoda
- Class: Insecta
- Order: Lepidoptera
- Family: Geometridae
- Genus: Eupithecia
- Species: E. sierrae

Binomial name
- Eupithecia sierrae (Hulst, 1896)

Synonyms
- Tephroclystia sierrae Hulst, 1896; Eupithecia conceptata Pearsall, 1909; Eupithecia joymaketa Cassino, 1925

Species of moth

Eupithecia sierrae is a moth in the family Geometridae first described by George Duryea Hulst in 1896. It is found in North America, including Colorado, Wyoming, southern Utah, New Mexico, Arizona and California.

The wingspan is about 20 mm.
