= Eupithecia palmata =

Scientific classification
- Kingdom: Animalia
- Phylum: Arthropoda
- Class: Insecta
- Order: Lepidoptera
- Family: Geometridae
- Genus: Eupithecia
- Species: E. palmata

Binomial name
- Eupithecia palmata Cassino & Swett, 1922

Species of moth

Eupithecia palmata is a moth in the family Geometridae first described by Samuel E. Cassino and Louis W. Swett in 1922. It is found in the US state of California. Its habitat consists of deserts.

The wingspan is about 17 mm.
