= Eupithecia multiscripta =

Scientific classification
- Domain: Eukaryota
- Kingdom: Animalia
- Phylum: Arthropoda
- Class: Insecta
- Order: Lepidoptera
- Family: Geometridae
- Genus: Eupithecia
- Species: E. multiscripta

Binomial name
- Eupithecia multiscripta (Hulst, 1896)

Synonyms
- Tephroclystia multiscripta Hulst, 1896

Species of moth

Eupithecia multiscripta is a moth in the family Geometridae. It is found in North America, including Colorado, Utah, Idaho, Wyoming, Montana, Washington and California.

The wingspan is about 27 mm. Adults have been recorded on wing from April to June.
