= Eupithecia mystiata =

Scientific classification
- Domain: Eukaryota
- Kingdom: Animalia
- Phylum: Arthropoda
- Class: Insecta
- Order: Lepidoptera
- Family: Geometridae
- Genus: Eupithecia
- Species: E. mystiata

Binomial name
- Eupithecia mystiata Cassino, 1925

Species of moth

Eupithecia mystiata is a moth in the family Geometridae first described by Samuel E. Cassino in 1925. It is found in the US states of Arizona and California.

The wingspan is about 22 mm. Adults have been recorded on wing from February to May.
