= Scopula timandrata =

Scientific classification
- Kingdom: Animalia
- Phylum: Arthropoda
- Class: Insecta
- Order: Lepidoptera
- Family: Geometridae
- Genus: Scopula
- Species: S. timandrata

Binomial name
- Scopula timandrata (Walker, 1861)

Synonyms
- Acidalia timandrata Walker, 1861; Acidalia rufilinearia Walker, 1861

Species of geometer moth in subfamily Sterrhinae

Scopula timandrata is a moth of the family Geometridae. It is found in Florida.

The wingspan is about 24–27 mm.
