= Eupithecia helena =

Scientific classification
- Domain: Eukaryota
- Kingdom: Animalia
- Phylum: Arthropoda
- Class: Insecta
- Order: Lepidoptera
- Family: Geometridae
- Genus: Eupithecia
- Species: E. helena

Binomial name
- Eupithecia helena Taylor, 1906

Species of moth

Eupithecia helena is a moth in the family Geometridae. It is found from Arizona and New Mexico, through Utah to Montana.

The wingspan is about 18 mm. Adults have been recorded on wing from July to August.
