= Eupithecia macdunnoughi =

Scientific classification
- Domain: Eukaryota
- Kingdom: Animalia
- Phylum: Arthropoda
- Class: Insecta
- Order: Lepidoptera
- Family: Geometridae
- Genus: Eupithecia
- Species: E. macdunnoughi

Binomial name
- Eupithecia macdunnoughi Rindge, 1952

Synonyms
- Eupithecia suspiciosata McDunnough, 1949 (preocc. Dietze)

Species of moth

Eupithecia macdunnoughi is a moth in the family Geometridae first described by Rindge in 1952. It is found in the western US states of California, Arizona, Nevada, Utah and Colorado.

The wingspan is about 18 mm.
