= Eupithecia redingtonia =

Scientific classification
- Domain: Eukaryota
- Kingdom: Animalia
- Phylum: Arthropoda
- Class: Insecta
- Order: Lepidoptera
- Family: Geometridae
- Genus: Eupithecia
- Species: E. redingtonia

Binomial name
- Eupithecia redingtonia McDunnough, 1946

Species of moth

Eupithecia redingtonia is a moth in the family Geometridae first described by James Halliday McDunnough in 1946. It is found in the US state of Arizona.
