= Eupithecia karenae =

Scientific classification
- Domain: Eukaryota
- Kingdom: Animalia
- Phylum: Arthropoda
- Class: Insecta
- Order: Lepidoptera
- Family: Geometridae
- Genus: Eupithecia
- Species: E. karenae

Binomial name
- Eupithecia karenae Leuschner, 1966

Species of moth

Eupithecia karenae is a moth in the family Geometridae. It is found in coastal California and Arizona.

The wingspan is 19–22 mm. It was the first new species identified by the hobby Lepidopterist Ronald Leuschner, and named for his eldest daughter, Karen.
