= Eupithecia subvirens =

Scientific classification
- Domain: Eukaryota
- Kingdom: Animalia
- Phylum: Arthropoda
- Class: Insecta
- Order: Lepidoptera
- Family: Geometridae
- Genus: Eupithecia
- Species: E. subvirens

Binomial name
- Eupithecia subvirens Dietze, 1875

Synonyms
- Eupithecia diegata McDunnough, 1940; Eupithecia laisata Strecker, 1899

Species of moth

Eupithecia subvirens is a moth in the family Geometridae. It is found in California and Oregon.

The wingspan is 19 mm.
