= Eupithecia purpurissata =

Scientific classification
- Domain: Eukaryota
- Kingdom: Animalia
- Phylum: Arthropoda
- Class: Insecta
- Order: Lepidoptera
- Family: Geometridae
- Genus: Eupithecia
- Species: E. purpurissata

Binomial name
- Eupithecia purpurissata Grossbeck, 1908

Synonyms
- Tephroclystia muriflua Dyar, 1923

Species of moth

Eupithecia purpurissata is a moth in the family Geometridae first described by John Arthur Grossbeck in 1908. It is found in the US state of California.

The wingspan is about 20 millimetres (0.79 in). Adults have been recorded on wing from February to July.

== Subspecies ==
- Eupithecia purpurissata purpurissata (northern and central California)
- Eupithecia purpurissata valariata Pearsall, 1910 (southern California)
