= Eupithecia herefordaria =

Scientific classification
- Domain: Eukaryota
- Kingdom: Animalia
- Phylum: Arthropoda
- Class: Insecta
- Order: Lepidoptera
- Family: Geometridae
- Genus: Eupithecia
- Species: E. herefordaria

Binomial name
- Eupithecia herefordaria Cassino & Swett, 1923

Species of moth

Eupithecia herefordaria, or Hereford's eupithecia, is a moth in the family Geometridae. It is found in south-eastern Arizona, United States.

The length of the forewings is 9-10.5 mm. Adults are on wing in early spring.
