= Hellinsia thoracica =

Scientific classification
- Domain: Eukaryota
- Kingdom: Animalia
- Phylum: Arthropoda
- Class: Insecta
- Order: Lepidoptera
- Family: Pterophoridae
- Genus: Hellinsia
- Species: H. thoracica

Binomial name
- Hellinsia thoracica (McDunnough, 1939)

Synonyms
- Oidaematophora thoracica McDunnough, 1939

Species of moth

Hellinsia thoracica is a moth of the family Pterophoridae. It is found in North America, including Arizona.

The wingspan is 18–20 mm.
