= Eupithecia longidens =

Scientific classification
- Domain: Eukaryota
- Kingdom: Animalia
- Phylum: Arthropoda
- Class: Insecta
- Order: Lepidoptera
- Family: Geometridae
- Genus: Eupithecia
- Species: E. longidens

Binomial name
- Eupithecia longidens (Hulst, 1896)

Synonyms
- Tephroclystia longidens Hulst, 1896; Eupithecia kerrvillaria Cassino & Swett, 1924

Species of moth

Eupithecia longidens is a moth in the family Geometridae. It is found in North America, including Texas, Arizona, New Mexico, Colorado and Utah.

The wingspan is about 19 mm.
