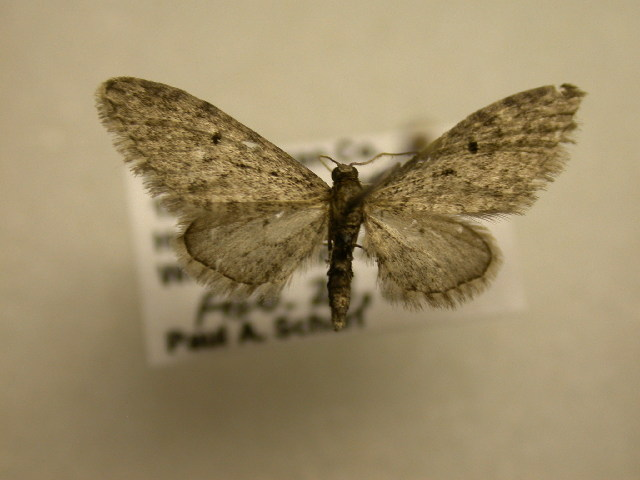

Scientific classification
- Domain: Eukaryota
- Kingdom: Animalia
- Phylum: Arthropoda
- Class: Insecta
- Order: Lepidoptera
- Family: Geometridae
- Genus: Eupithecia
- Species: E. matheri

Binomial name
- Eupithecia matheri Rindge, 1985

= Eupithecia matheri =

Species of moth

Eupithecia matheri is a moth in the family Geometridae first described by Frederick H. Rindge in 1985. It is found in the US states of Connecticut, New York, New Jersey, Pennsylvania, Virginia, North Carolina, Mississippi, Louisiana, Texas and possibly Kansas.

The length of the forewings is 9 mm for males and 8.5–10 mm for females. Adults are on wing from late January to the beginning of April.
