= Eupithecia slossonata =

Scientific classification
- Kingdom: Animalia
- Phylum: Arthropoda
- Class: Insecta
- Order: Lepidoptera
- Family: Geometridae
- Genus: Eupithecia
- Species: E. slossonata

Binomial name
- Eupithecia slossonata McDunnough, 1949

Species of moth

Eupithecia slossonata is a moth in the family Geometridae first described by James Halliday McDunnough in 1949. It is found in the US states of Florida, Georgia, Kentucky and Maryland.
