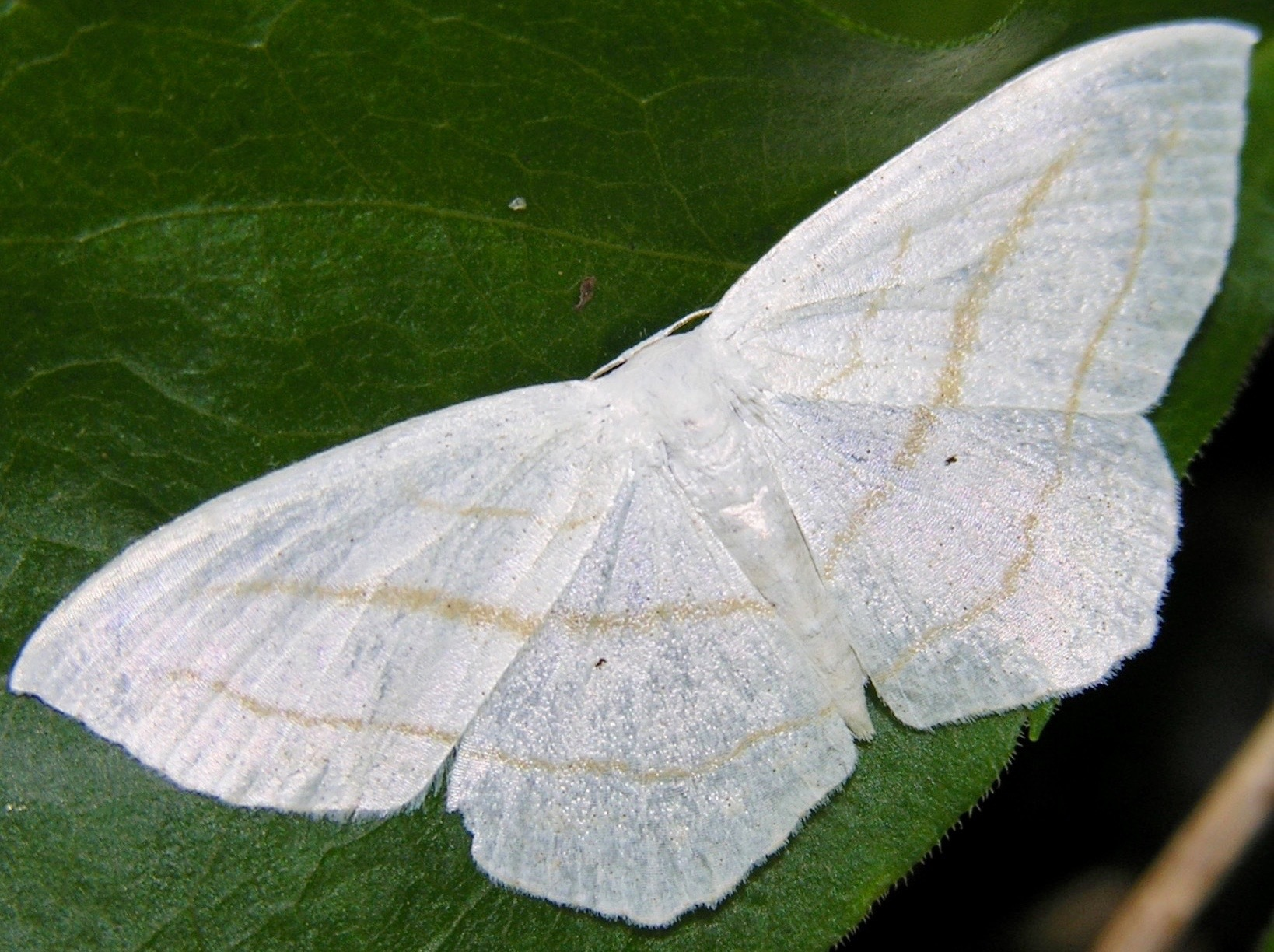

Scientific classification
- Kingdom: Animalia
- Phylum: Arthropoda
- Class: Insecta
- Order: Lepidoptera
- Family: Geometridae
- Genus: Scopula
- Species: S. ordinata

Binomial name
- Scopula ordinata (Walker, 1861)

Synonyms
- Acidalia ordinata Walker, 1861; Acidalia candidaria Packard, 1873; Acidalia puraria Walker, 1861

= Scopula ordinata =

Species of geometer moth in subfamily Sterrhinae

Scopula ordinata is a moth of the family Geometridae. It was described by Francis Walker in 1861. It is found in North America, including Alabama, Florida, Georgia, Iowa, Louisiana, North Carolina and Tennessee.

The larvae feed on Trillium catesbaei.
