= Eupithecia sabulosata =

Scientific classification
- Kingdom: Animalia
- Phylum: Arthropoda
- Class: Insecta
- Order: Lepidoptera
- Family: Geometridae
- Genus: Eupithecia
- Species: E. sabulosata

Binomial name
- Eupithecia sabulosata McDunnough, 1944

Species of moth

Eupithecia sabulosata is a moth in the family Geometridae first described by James Halliday McDunnough in 1944. It is found in the US state of California.

The wingspan is 22–23 mm.

The larvae feed on Thuja plicata. The larvae are various shades of green with a brown head.
