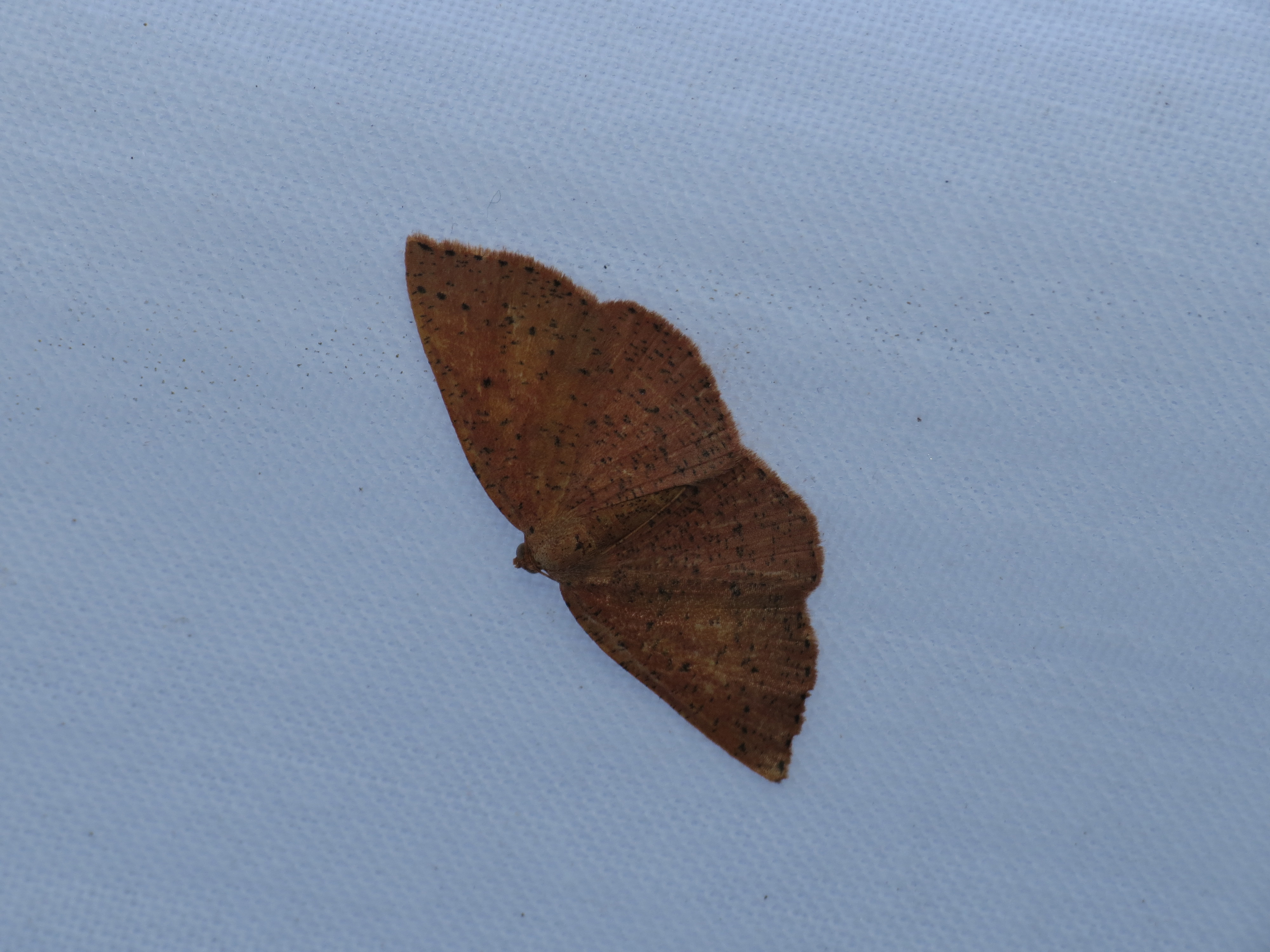
- adult
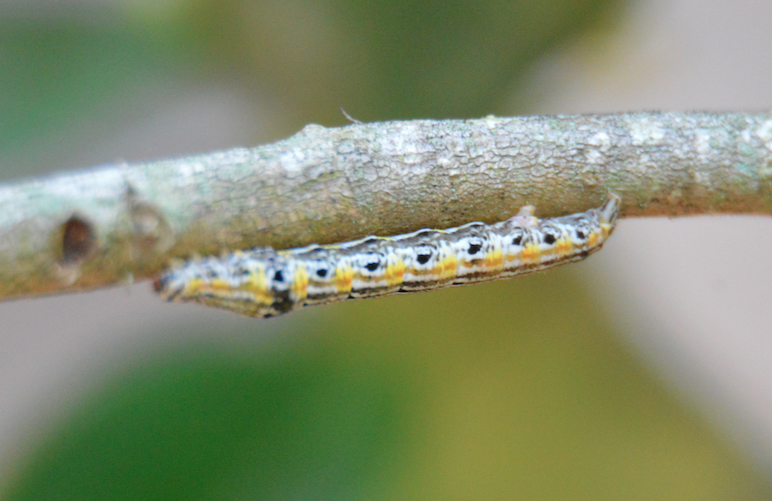
- caterpillar

Scientific classification
- Kingdom: Animalia
- Phylum: Arthropoda
- Clade: Pancrustacea
- Class: Insecta
- Order: Lepidoptera
- Family: Geometridae
- Tribe: Caberini
- Genus: Episemasia
- Species: E. solitaria

Binomial name
- Episemasia solitaria (Walker, 1861)

= Episemasia solitaria =

Species of moth

Episemasia solitaria is a species of geometrid moth in the family Geometridae. It is found in North America.
