= Parilexia proditata =

Scientific classification
- Kingdom: Animalia
- Phylum: Arthropoda
- Class: Insecta
- Order: Lepidoptera
- Family: Geometridae
- Tribe: Caberini
- Genus: Parilexia
- Species: P. proditata

Binomial name
- Parilexia proditata (Walker, 1861)

Species of insect

Parilexia proditata is a species of geometrid moth from the Geometridae family. It is found in the Caribbean Sea and North America.

The MONA or Hodges number for Parilexia proditata is 6712.
