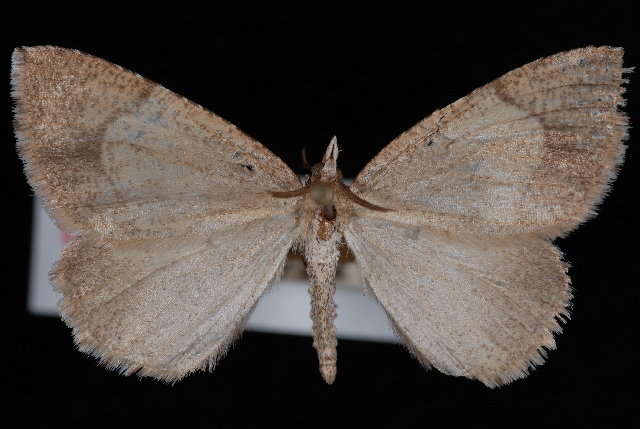

Scientific classification
- Domain: Eukaryota
- Kingdom: Animalia
- Phylum: Arthropoda
- Class: Insecta
- Order: Lepidoptera
- Family: Geometridae
- Tribe: Caberini
- Genus: Sericosema
- Species: S. wilsonensis

Binomial name
- Sericosema wilsonensis Cassino & Swett, 1922

= Sericosema wilsonensis =

Species of moth

Sericosema wilsonensis is a species of geometrid moth in the family Geometridae. It is found in North America.

The MONA or Hodges number for Sericosema wilsonensis is 6674.
