= Drepanulatrix garneri =

Scientific classification
- Domain: Eukaryota
- Kingdom: Animalia
- Phylum: Arthropoda
- Class: Insecta
- Order: Lepidoptera
- Family: Geometridae
- Tribe: Caberini
- Genus: Drepanulatrix
- Species: D. garneri

Binomial name
- Drepanulatrix garneri A. Blanchard & Knudson, 1986

Species of moth

Drepanulatrix garneri is a species of geometrid moth in the family Geometridae. It is found in North America.

The MONA or Hodges number for Drepanulatrix garneri is 6686.1.
