= Ixala proutearia =

Scientific classification
- Domain: Eukaryota
- Kingdom: Animalia
- Phylum: Arthropoda
- Class: Insecta
- Order: Lepidoptera
- Family: Geometridae
- Tribe: Caberini
- Genus: Ixala
- Species: I. proutearia

Binomial name
- Ixala proutearia Cassino, 1928

Species of moth

Ixala proutearia is a species of geometrid moth in the family Geometridae. It is found in North America.

The MONA or Hodges number for Ixala proutearia is 6696.
