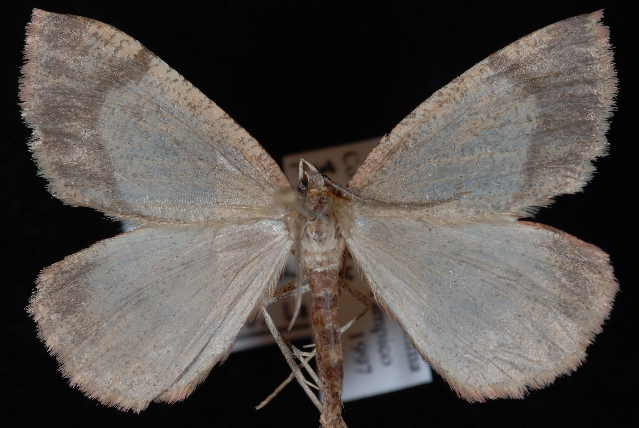

Scientific classification
- Kingdom: Animalia
- Phylum: Arthropoda
- Class: Insecta
- Order: Lepidoptera
- Family: Geometridae
- Tribe: Caberini
- Genus: Sericosema
- Species: S. juturnaria

Binomial name
- Sericosema juturnaria (Guenée in Boisduval & Guenée, 1858)

= Sericosema juturnaria =

Species of moth

Sericosema juturnaria, known as the Bordered Fawn, belongs to the family Geometridae. This species is identified across North America. The species is categorized under the geometrid moths, recognized for the caterpillars' "looping" movement. Its common name, Bordered Fawn, is derived from the distinct border on its wings. Adults of this species exhibit a wing pattern with shades of brown and tan, mimicking a fawn's appearance.

The MONA or Hodges number for Sericosema juturnaria is 6672.
