= Drepanulatrix monicaria =

Scientific classification
- Kingdom: Animalia
- Phylum: Arthropoda
- Class: Insecta
- Order: Lepidoptera
- Family: Geometridae
- Tribe: Caberini
- Genus: Drepanulatrix
- Species: D. monicaria

Binomial name
- Drepanulatrix monicaria (Guenée in Boisduval & Guenée, 1858)

Species of moth

Drepanulatrix monicaria is a species of geometrid moth in the family Geometridae. It is found in North America.

The MONA or Hodges number for Drepanulatrix monicaria is 6692.
