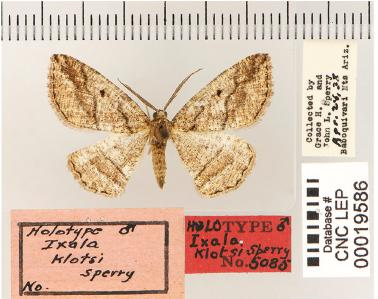
- Holotype of Ixala klotsi (2011)

Scientific classification
- Kingdom: Animalia
- Phylum: Arthropoda
- Clade: Pancrustacea
- Class: Insecta
- Order: Lepidoptera
- Family: Geometridae
- Tribe: Caberini
- Genus: Ixala; Hulst, 1896

= Ixala =

Genus of moths

Ixala is a genus of moths in the family Geometridae first described by George Duryea Hulst in 1896.

- Ixala desperaria Hulst, 1887
- Ixala proutearia Cassino, 1928
- Ixala klotsi Sperry, 1940
- Ixala adventaria Pearsall, 1906
