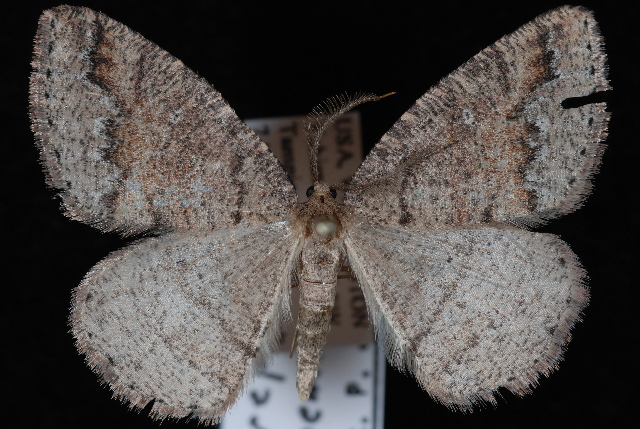

Scientific classification
- Kingdom: Animalia
- Phylum: Arthropoda
- Clade: Pancrustacea
- Class: Insecta
- Order: Lepidoptera
- Family: Geometridae
- Tribe: Caberini
- Genus: Drepanulatrix
- Species: D. foeminaria

Binomial name
- Drepanulatrix foeminaria (Guenée in Boisduval & Guenée, 1858)

= Drepanulatrix foeminaria =

Species of geometrid moth

Drepanulatrix foeminaria is a species of geometrid moth in the family Geometridae. It is found in North America.

The MONA or Hodges number for Drepanulatrix foeminaria is 6686.

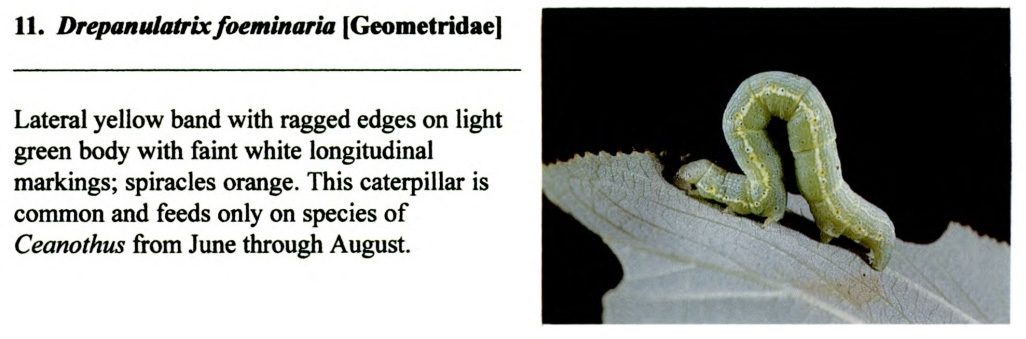
Drepanulatix foeminaria caterpillar
