= Ixala adventaria =

Scientific classification
- Domain: Eukaryota
- Kingdom: Animalia
- Phylum: Arthropoda
- Class: Insecta
- Order: Lepidoptera
- Family: Geometridae
- Tribe: Caberini
- Genus: Ixala
- Species: I. adventaria

Binomial name
- Ixala adventaria Pearsall, 1906

Species of moth

Ixala adventaria is a species of geometrid moth in the family Geometridae. It is found in North America.

The MONA or Hodges number for Ixala adventaria is 6698.
