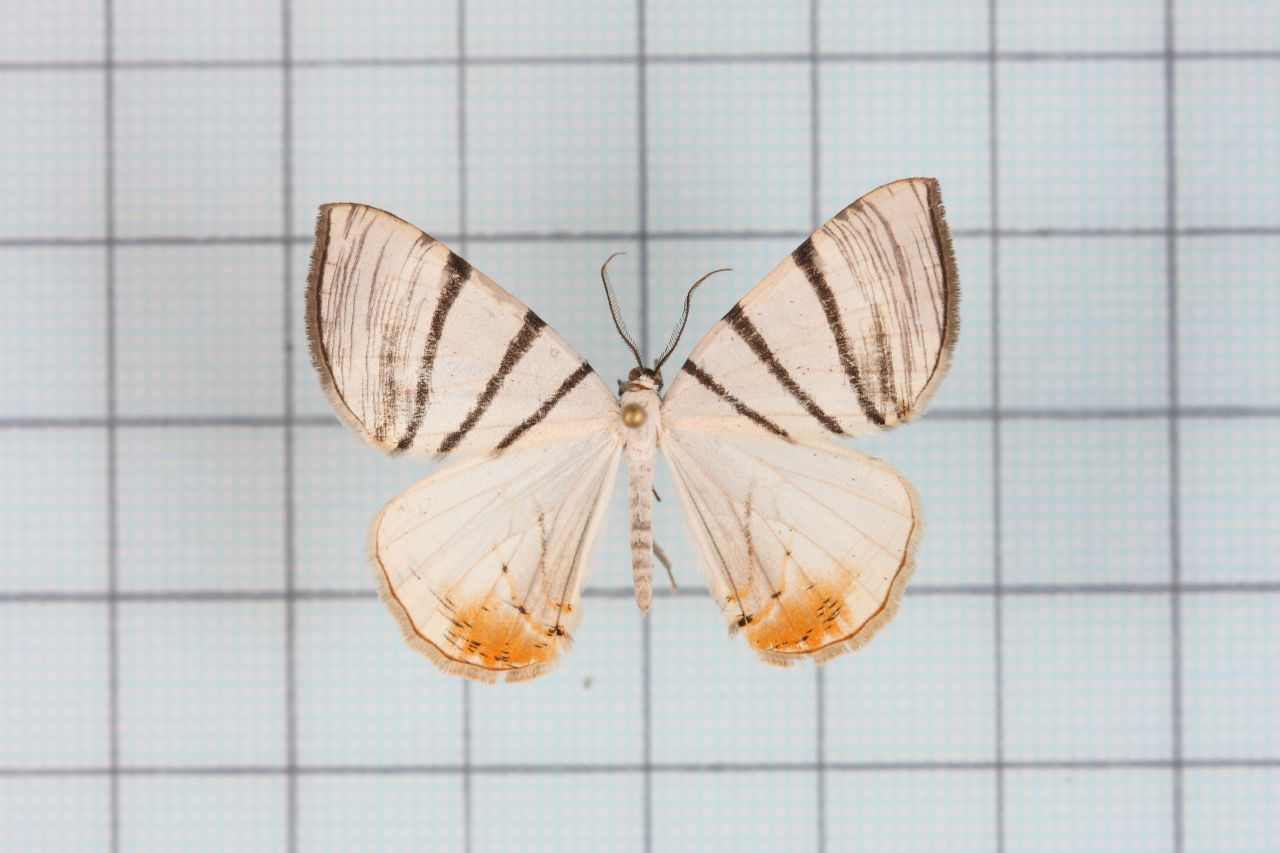
- Myrteta_angelica - Male

Scientific classification
- Kingdom: Animalia
- Phylum: Arthropoda
- Class: Insecta
- Order: Lepidoptera
- Family: Geometridae
- Tribe: Caberini
- Genus: Myrteta; Walker, 1861

= Myrteta =

Genus of moths

Myrteta is a genus of moths in the family Geometridae. It was first described by Francis Walker in 1861.

Palpi slender and porrect (extending forward), not reaching beyond the frons. Forewings with vein 3 from just before angle of cell. Veins 7 to 9 stalked from just before upper angle. Vein 10 and 11 stalked and anastomosing (fusing) with vein 12. Hindwings with vein 8 from before angle of cell.

== Species ==
- Myrteta angelica Butler, 1881
- Myrteta argentaria Leech, 1897
- Myrteta interferenda Wehrli, 1939
- Myrteta leroyi (D. S. Fletcher, 1958)
- Myrteta parallelaria (Warren, 1902)
- Myrteta planaria Walker, 1861
- Myrteta punctata (Warren, 1894)
- Myrteta sinensaria Leech, 1897
- Myrteta tripunctaria Leech, 1897
