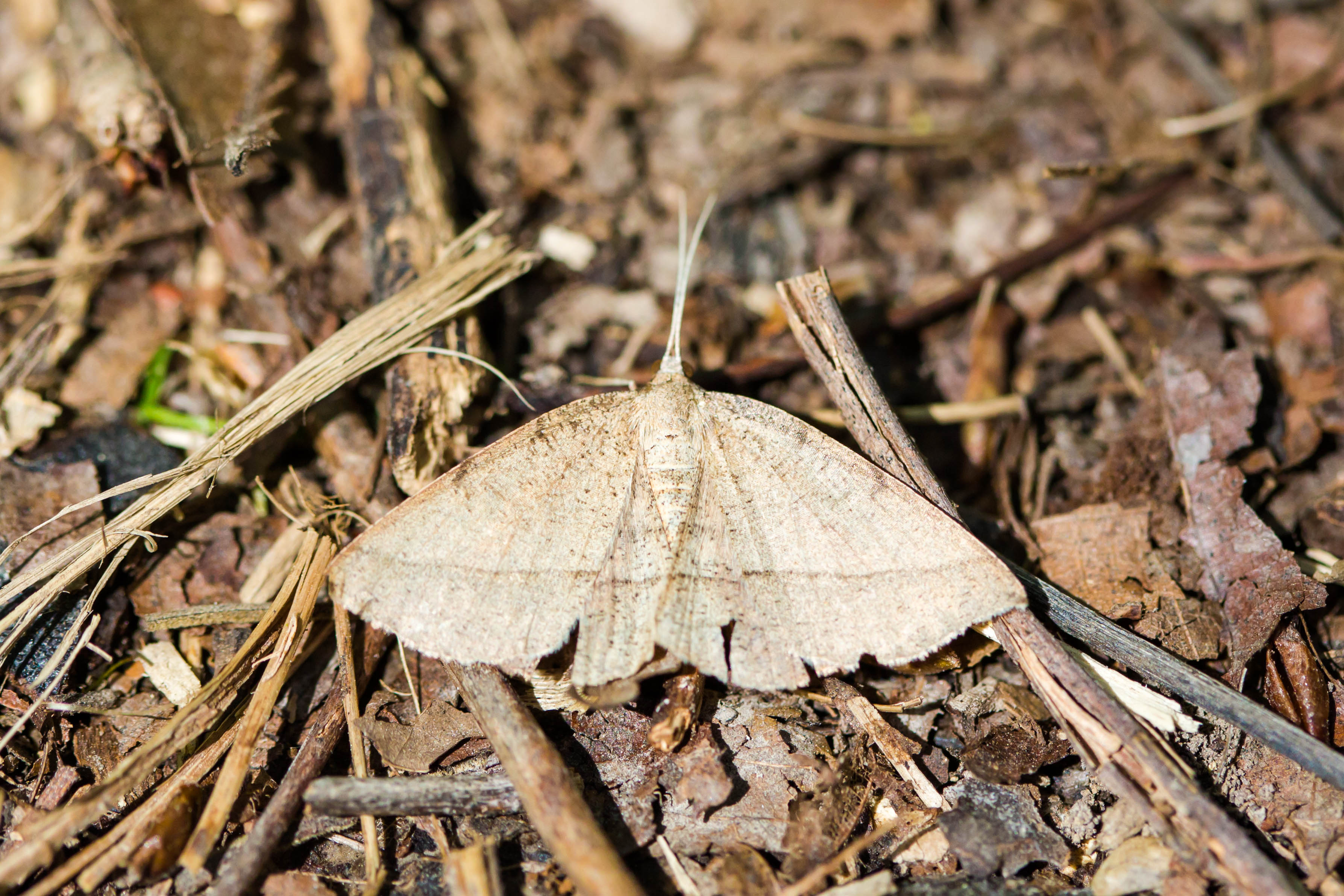

Scientific classification
- Kingdom: Animalia
- Phylum: Arthropoda
- Clade: Pancrustacea
- Class: Insecta
- Order: Lepidoptera
- Family: Geometridae
- Genus: Erastria
- Species: E. cruentaria

Binomial name
- Erastria cruentaria (Hübner, 1799)

= Erastria cruentaria =

Species of moth

Erastria cruentaria, the thin-lined erastria, is a species of geometrid moth in the family Geometridae. It is found in North America.

The MONA or Hodges number for Erastria cruentaria is 6705.
