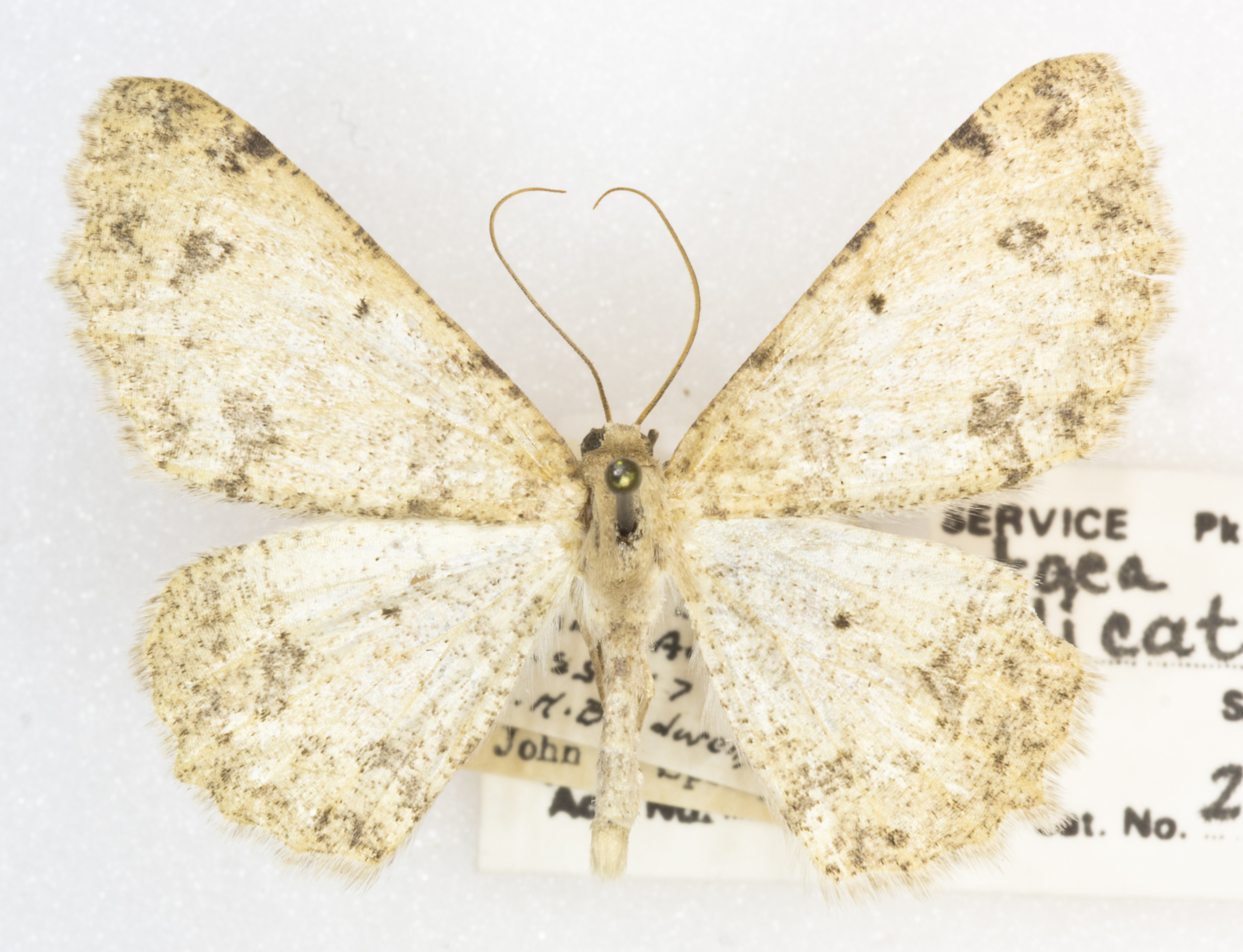

Scientific classification
- Domain: Eukaryota
- Kingdom: Animalia
- Phylum: Arthropoda
- Class: Insecta
- Order: Lepidoptera
- Family: Geometridae
- Genus: Stergamataea
- Species: S. delicatum

Binomial name
- Stergamataea delicatum (Hulst, 1900)

= Stergamataea delicatum =

Species of moth

Stergamataea delicatum is a species of geometrid moth in the family Geometridae. It is found in North America.

The MONA or Hodges number for Stergamataea delicatum is 6710.
