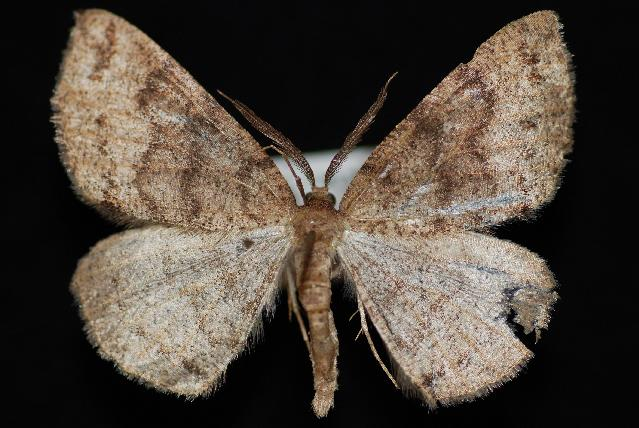

Scientific classification
- Domain: Eukaryota
- Kingdom: Animalia
- Phylum: Arthropoda
- Class: Insecta
- Order: Lepidoptera
- Family: Geometridae
- Genus: Apodrepanulatrix
- Species: A. litaria

Binomial name
- Apodrepanulatrix litaria (Hulst, 1887)

= Apodrepanulatrix litaria =

Species of moth

Apodrepanulatrix litaria, the large banded wave, is a species of geometrid moth in the family Geometridae.

The MONA or Hodges number for Apodrepanulatrix litaria is 6694.
