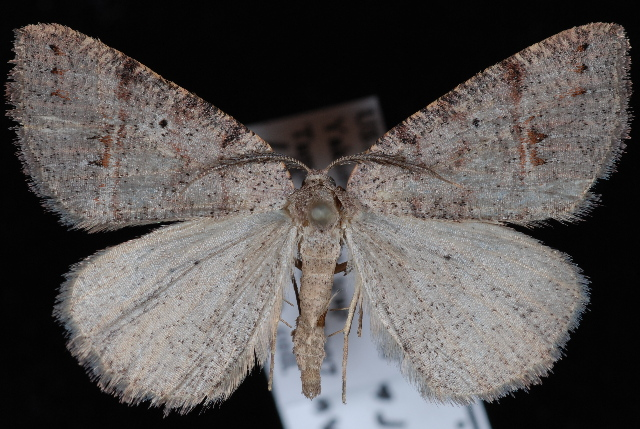

Scientific classification
- Kingdom: Animalia
- Phylum: Arthropoda
- Class: Insecta
- Order: Lepidoptera
- Family: Geometridae
- Genus: Drepanulatrix
- Species: D. quadraria

Binomial name
- Drepanulatrix quadraria (Grote, 1882)

= Drepanulatrix quadraria =

Species of moth

Drepanulatrix quadraria is a species of geometrid moth in the family Geometridae. It is found in North America.

The MONA or Hodges number for Drepanulatrix quadraria is 6685.

== Subspecies ==
These two subspecies belong to the species Drepanulatrix quadraria:

- Drepanulatrix quadraria quadraria
- Drepanulatrix quadraria usta Rindge, 1949
