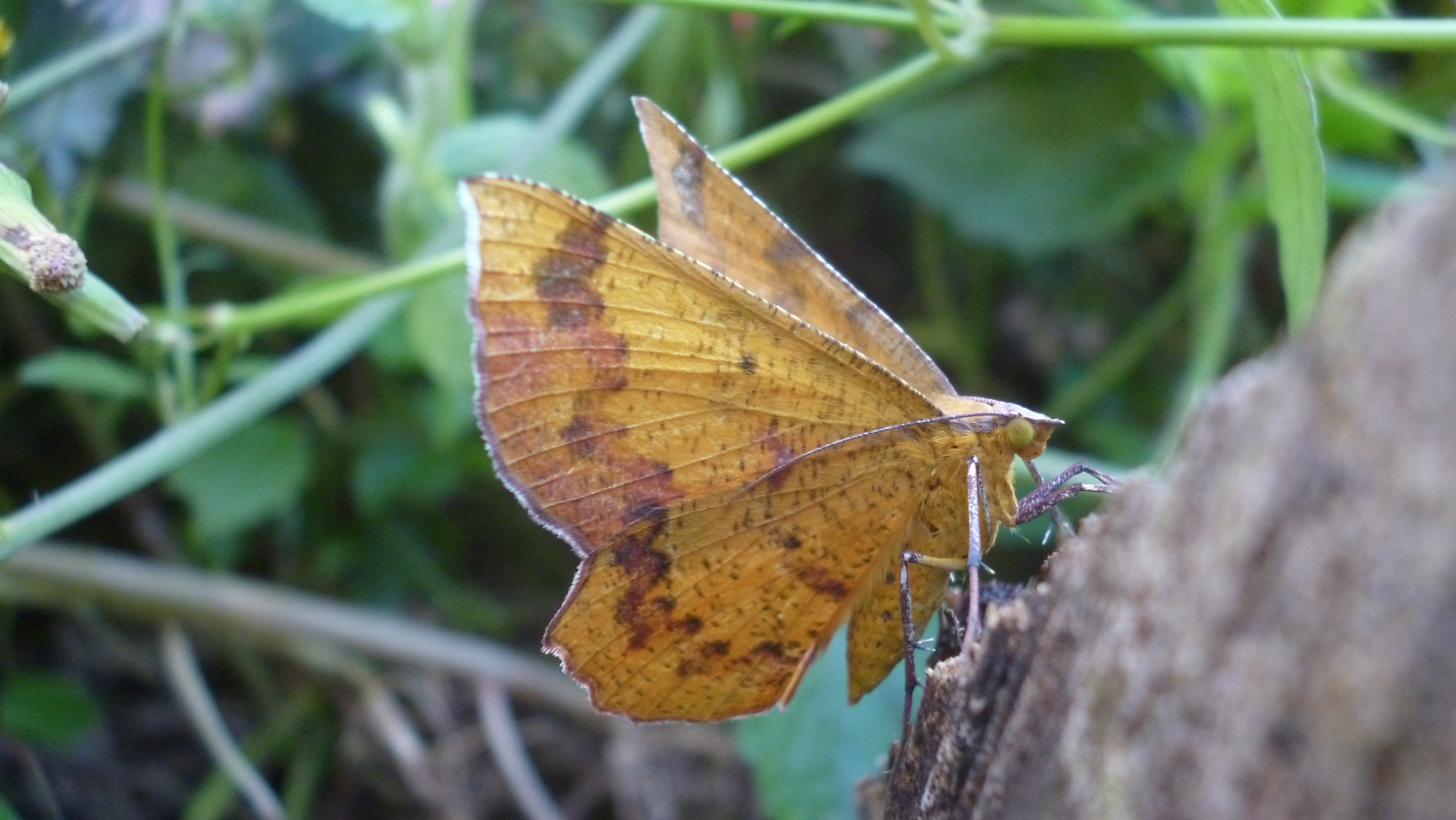

Scientific classification
- Kingdom: Animalia
- Phylum: Arthropoda
- Clade: Pancrustacea
- Class: Insecta
- Order: Lepidoptera
- Family: Geometridae
- Tribe: Caberini
- Genus: Erastria; Hübner, 1813

Synonyms
- Catopyrrha Hübner, 1823; Euchlidon Hübner, 1823; Petrodava Walker, 1863; Syrrhodia Hübner, 1823; Trosthis Hübner, 1821

= Erastria =

Genus of moths

Erastria is a genus of moths in the family Geometridae, found primarily in tropical and subtropical climates in Africa and Asia. The genus was erected by Jacob Hübner in 1813.

== Description ==
Palpi upturned, reaching above vertex of head, where the second joint clothed with long hair below, and third joint prominent. Antennae minutely ciliated in male. Thorax roughly scaled but tuftless. Abdomen with strong dorsal tufts, and shorter than the hindwings. Forewings with long and narrow areole. Hindwings with veins 3 and 4 from cell. Legs naked. Larva with four pairs of abdominal prolegs.

== Selected species ==
- Erastria accessaria (Hübner, 1825)
- Erastria aesymnusaria (Walker, 1860)
- Erastria albicatena (Warren, 1895) (from South Africa)
- Erastria albosignata (Walker, 1863) (from subtropical Africa)
- Erastria atrisignata (Warren, 1914)
- Erastria campylogramma (Prout, 1926)
- Erastria canente (Cramer, 1779) (from India)
- Erastria coloraria (Fabricius, 1798)
- Erastria combinataria (Walker)
- Erastria cruentaria (Hübner, 1796–99)
- Erastria curvilinea (Warren, 1901)
- Erastria decrepitaria (Hübner, 1823)
- Erastria dissimilaria (Hübner, 1806)
- Erastria esperanza (Barnes & McDonough, 1916)
- Erastria fletcheri (Viette, 1970)
- Erastria gibbosa (Warren, 1903)
- Erastria intensa (Warren, 1903)
- Erastria khasiana (Swinhoe, 1899) (from India)
- Erastria leucicolor (Butler, 1875) (from subtropical Africa)
- Erastria lucicolor (Swinhoe, 1904) (from subtropical Africa)
- Erastria lysima (Prout, 1926)
- Erastria madecassaria (Boisduval, 1833) (from subtropical Africa)
- Erastria marginata (Swinhoe, 1904) (from Ethiopia)
- Erastria nodieri (Oberthür, 1912) (from Senegal)
- Erastria phoenix (Swinhoe, 1898) (from India)
- Erastria swinhoei (Butler, 1880) (from India)
- Erastria viridirufaria (Neumoegen, 1881)
