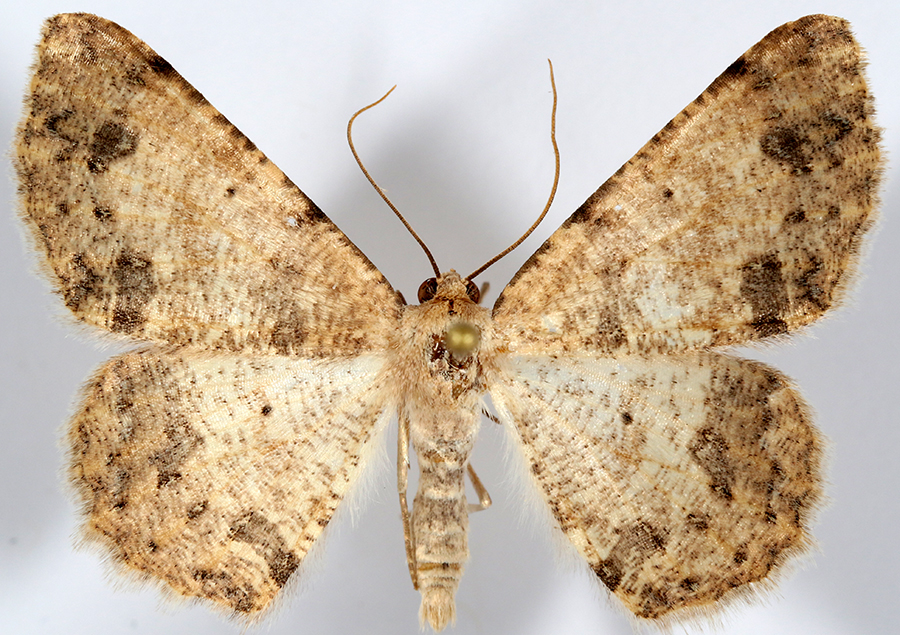
- Stergamataea inornata

Scientific classification
- Domain: Eukaryota
- Kingdom: Animalia
- Phylum: Arthropoda
- Class: Insecta
- Order: Lepidoptera
- Family: Geometridae
- Tribe: Caberini
- Genus: Stergamataea; Hulst, 1896

= Stergamataea =

Genus of moths

Stergamataea is a genus of moths in the family Geometridae first described by George Duryea Hulst in 1896.

== Species ==
- Stergamataea inornata Hulst, 1896
- Stergamataea delicatum (Hulst, 1900)
