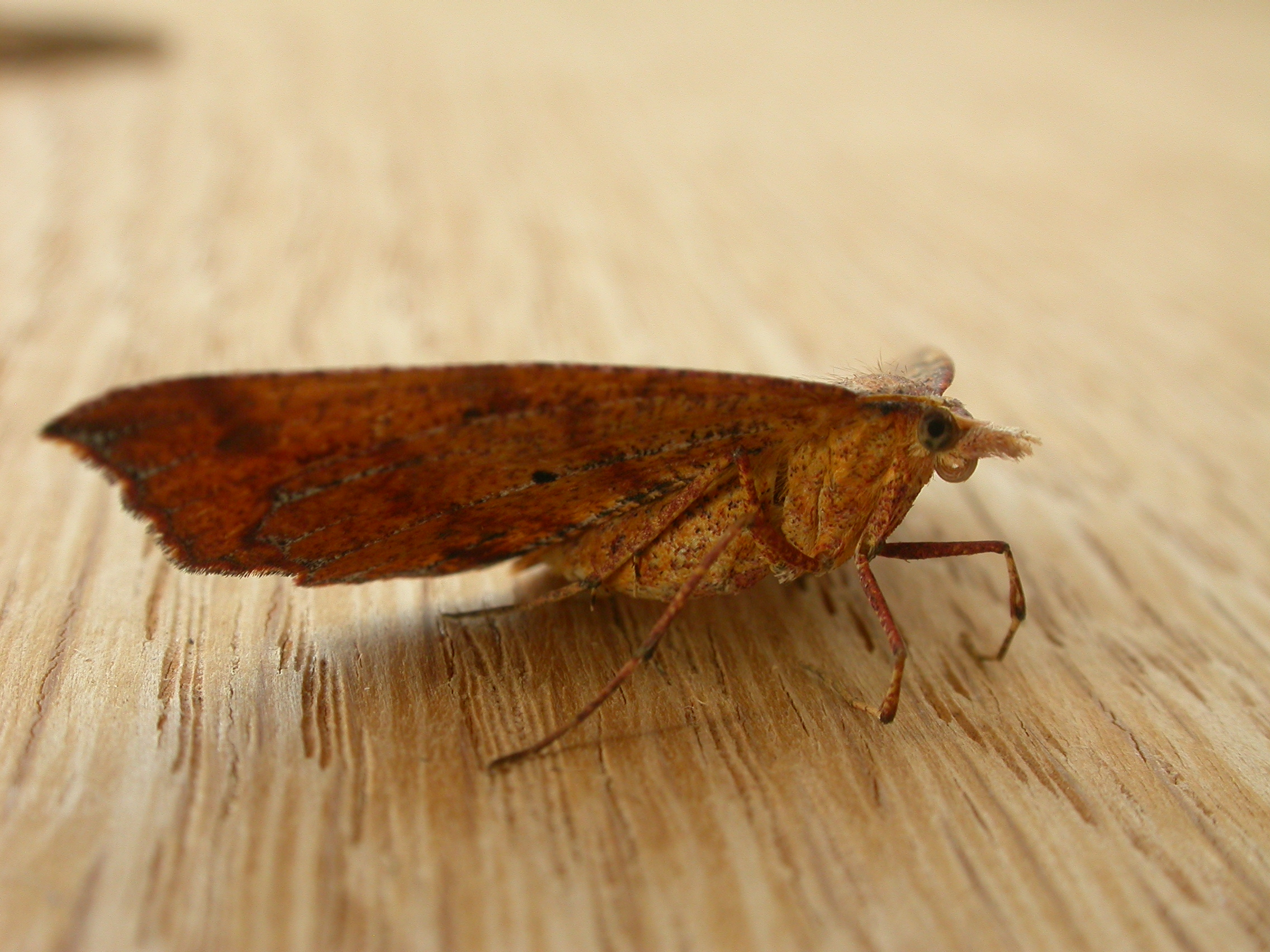

Scientific classification
- Kingdom: Animalia
- Phylum: Arthropoda
- Class: Insecta
- Order: Lepidoptera
- Family: Geometridae
- Genus: Rhinodia
- Species: R. rostraria

Binomial name
- Rhinodia rostraria Guenée, 1857

Synonyms
- Stegania allogata Felder & Rogenhofer, 1875

= Rhinodia rostraria =

Species of moth

Rhinodia rostraria is a moth of the family Geometridae first described by Achille Guenée in 1857. It is found in Australia, including Tasmania.

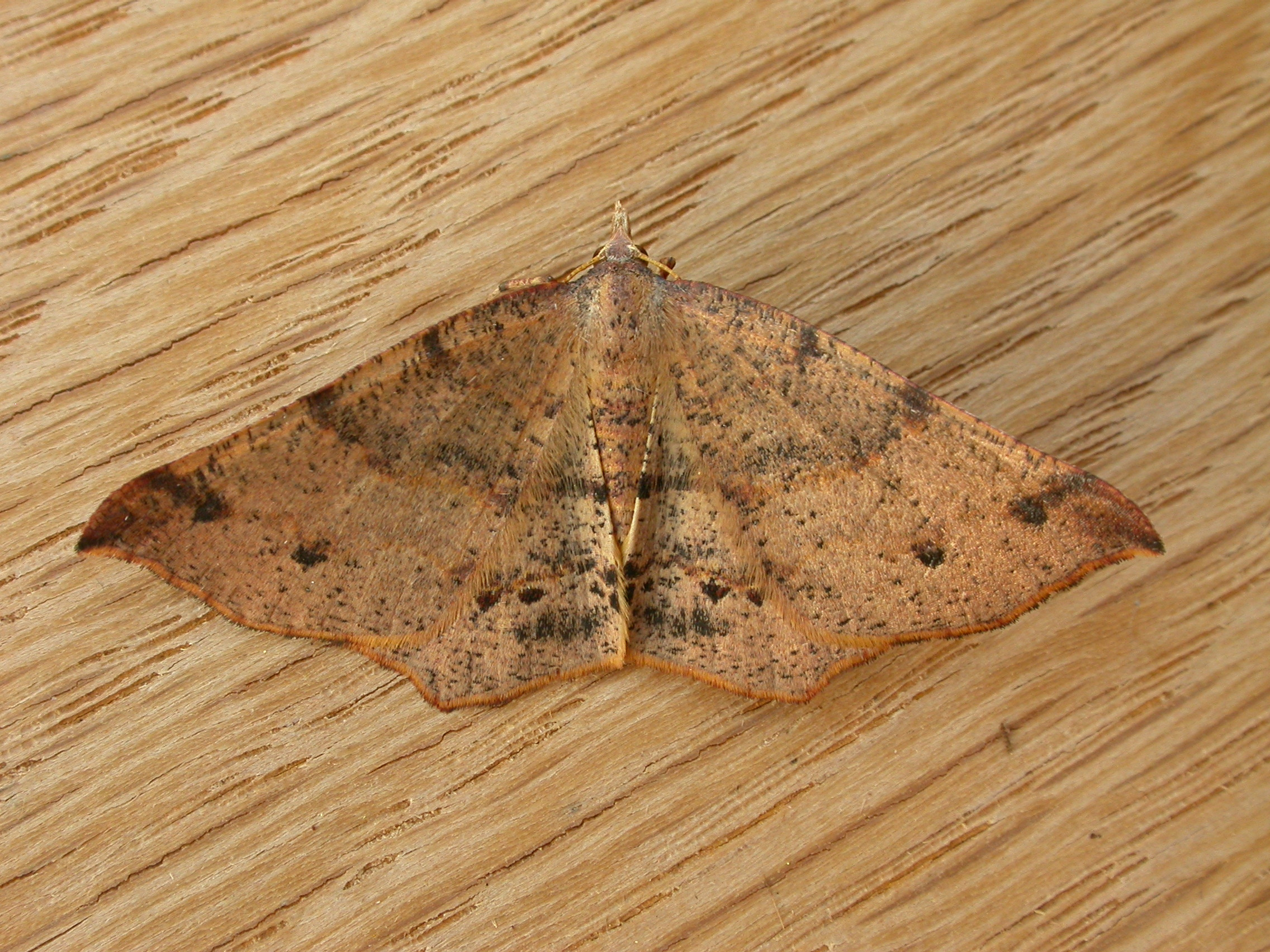
