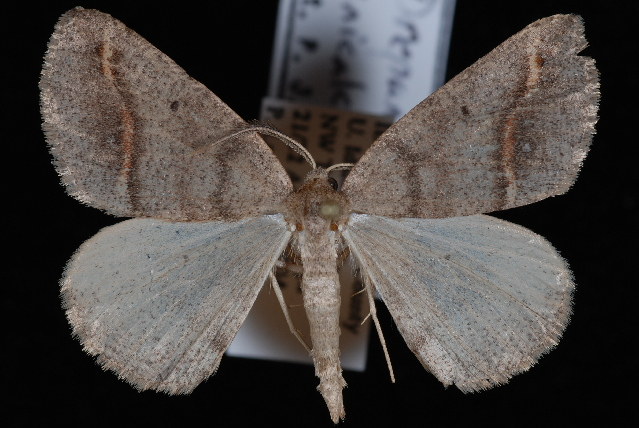

Scientific classification
- Kingdom: Animalia
- Phylum: Arthropoda
- Clade: Pancrustacea
- Class: Insecta
- Order: Lepidoptera
- Family: Geometridae
- Genus: Drepanulatrix
- Species: D. unicalcararia

Binomial name
- Drepanulatrix unicalcararia (Guenée in Boisduval & Guenée, 1858)

= Drepanulatrix unicalcararia =

Species of moth

Drepanulatrix unicalcararia, the spurred wave, is a species of geometrid moth in the family Geometridae. It is found in North America.

The MONA or Hodges number for Drepanulatrix unicalcararia is 6682.
