= Apodrepanulatrix liberaria =

Conservation status
- Vulnerable (NatureServe)

Scientific classification
- Kingdom: Animalia
- Phylum: Arthropoda
- Class: Insecta
- Order: Lepidoptera
- Family: Geometridae
- Genus: Apodrepanulatrix
- Species: A. liberaria

Binomial name
- Apodrepanulatrix liberaria (Walker, 1860)

Synonyms
- Apicia liberaria Walker, 1860; Macaria integraria Walker, 1861; Aspilates lintneraria Packard, 1874; Diastictis helena Hulst, 1896

Species of moth

Apodrepanulatrix liberaria, the New Jersey tea inchworm, is a moth in the family Geometridae. It was described by Francis Walker in 1860. It is found from extreme southern Quebec and southern Ontario southward into northern Florida and Mississippi. It is listed as endangered by state authorities in the US states of Massachusetts and Connecticut.

The wingspan is 25–35 mm.

The larvae feed on Ceanothus americanus.
