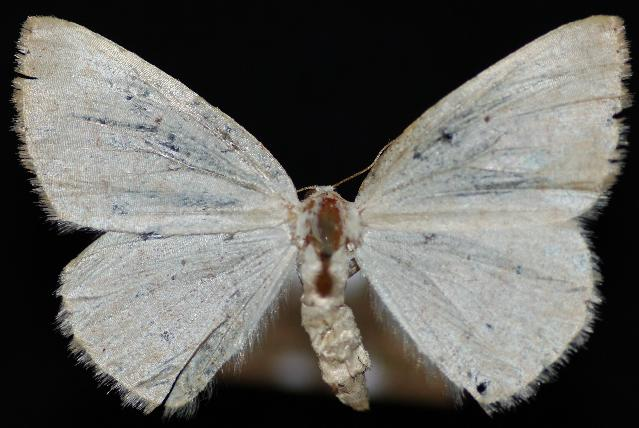
- Eudrepanulatrix rectifascia

Scientific classification
- Kingdom: Animalia
- Phylum: Arthropoda
- Class: Insecta
- Order: Lepidoptera
- Family: Geometridae
- Tribe: Caberini
- Genus: Eudrepanulatrix; Rindge, 1949

= Eudrepanulatrix =

Genus of moths

Eudrepanulatrix is a genus of moths in the family Geometridae first described by Rindge in 1949.

== Species ==
- Eudrepanulatrix rectifascia (Hulst, 1896)
