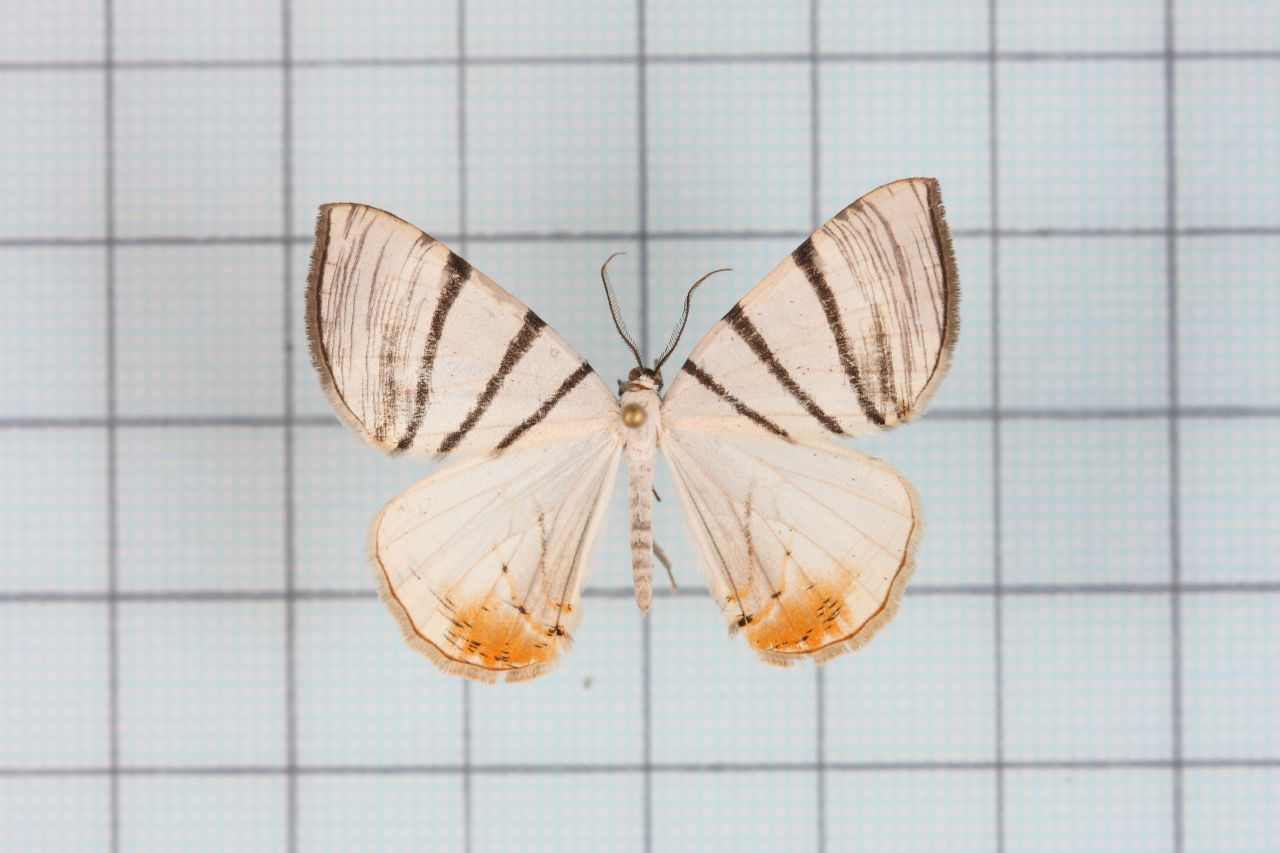
- Male
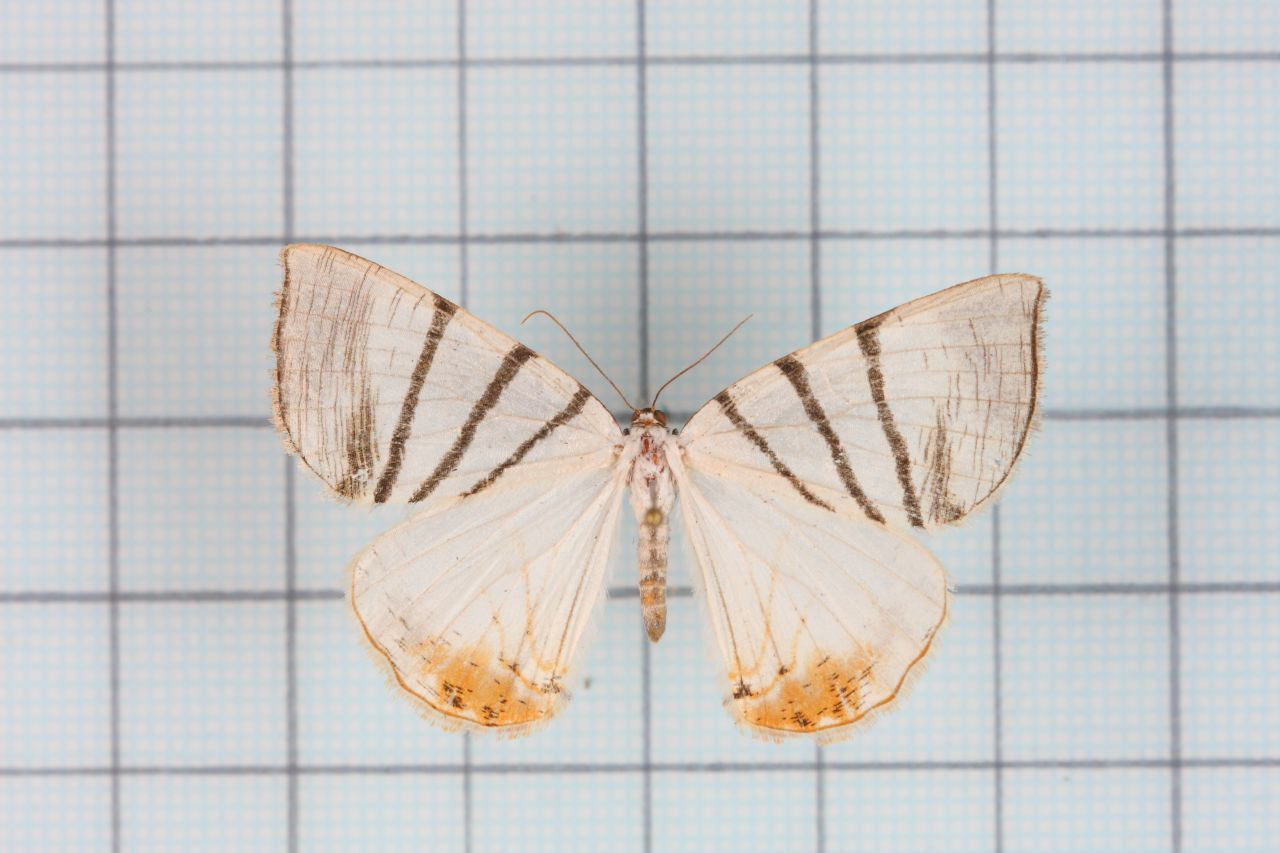
- Female

Scientific classification
- Domain: Eukaryota
- Kingdom: Animalia
- Phylum: Arthropoda
- Class: Insecta
- Order: Lepidoptera
- Family: Geometridae
- Genus: Myrteta
- Species: M. angelica

Binomial name
- Myrteta angelica Butler, 1881

= Myrteta angelica =

Species of moth

Myrteta angelica is a moth in the family Geometridae first described by Arthur Gardiner Butler in 1881. It is found in Japan, China and Taiwan.

The wingspan is 34–40 mm.

The larvae feed on Styrax species.
