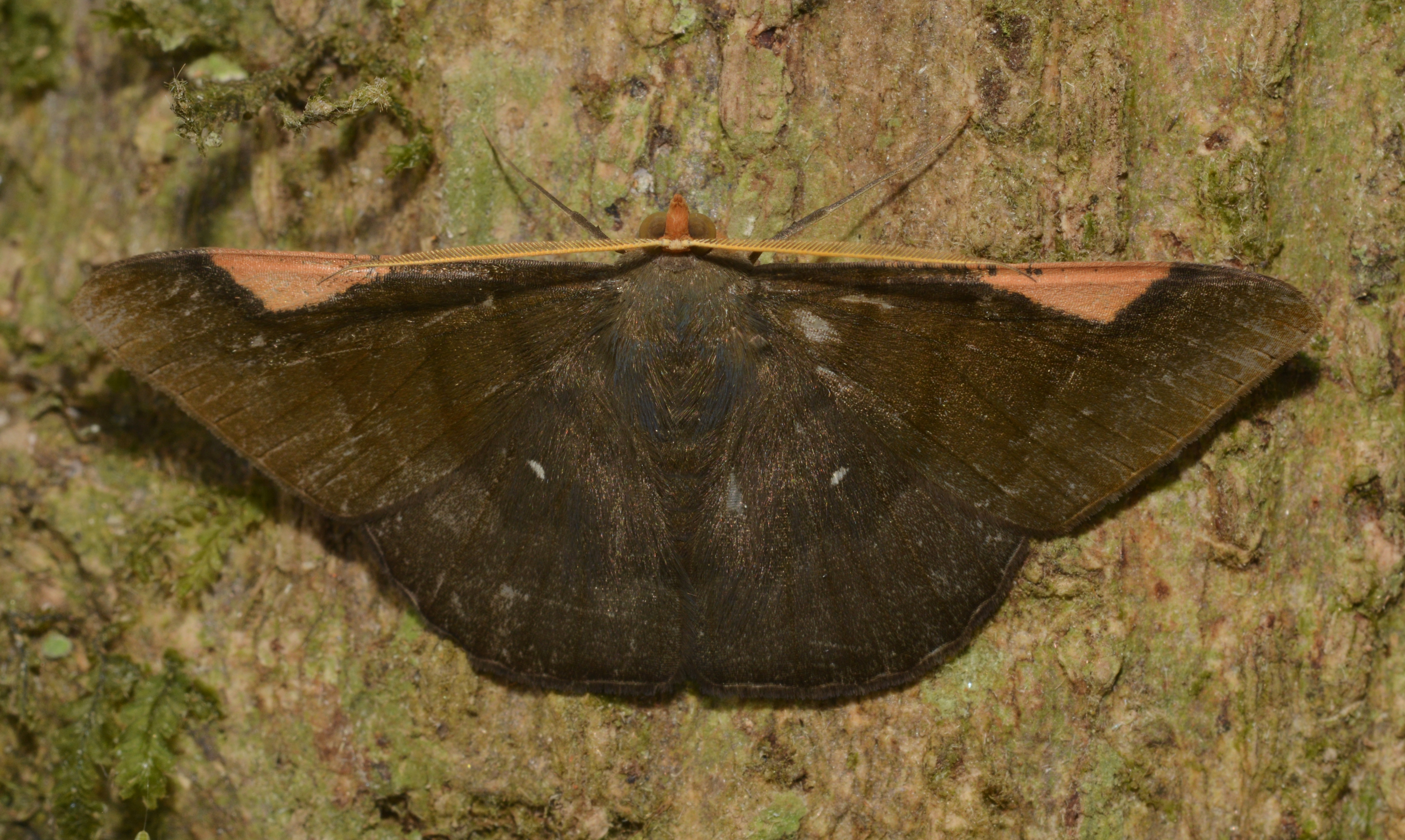

Scientific classification
- Domain: Eukaryota
- Kingdom: Animalia
- Phylum: Arthropoda
- Class: Insecta
- Order: Lepidoptera
- Family: Geometridae
- Tribe: Sphacelodini
- Genus: Sphacelodes
- Species: S. vulneraria

Binomial name
- Sphacelodes vulneraria (Hübner, 1823)

= Sphacelodes vulneraria =

Species of moth

Sphacelodes vulneraria is a species of geometrid moth in the family Geometridae. It is found in the Caribbean Sea, Central America, North America, and South America.

The MONA or Hodges number for Sphacelodes vulneraria is 6800.

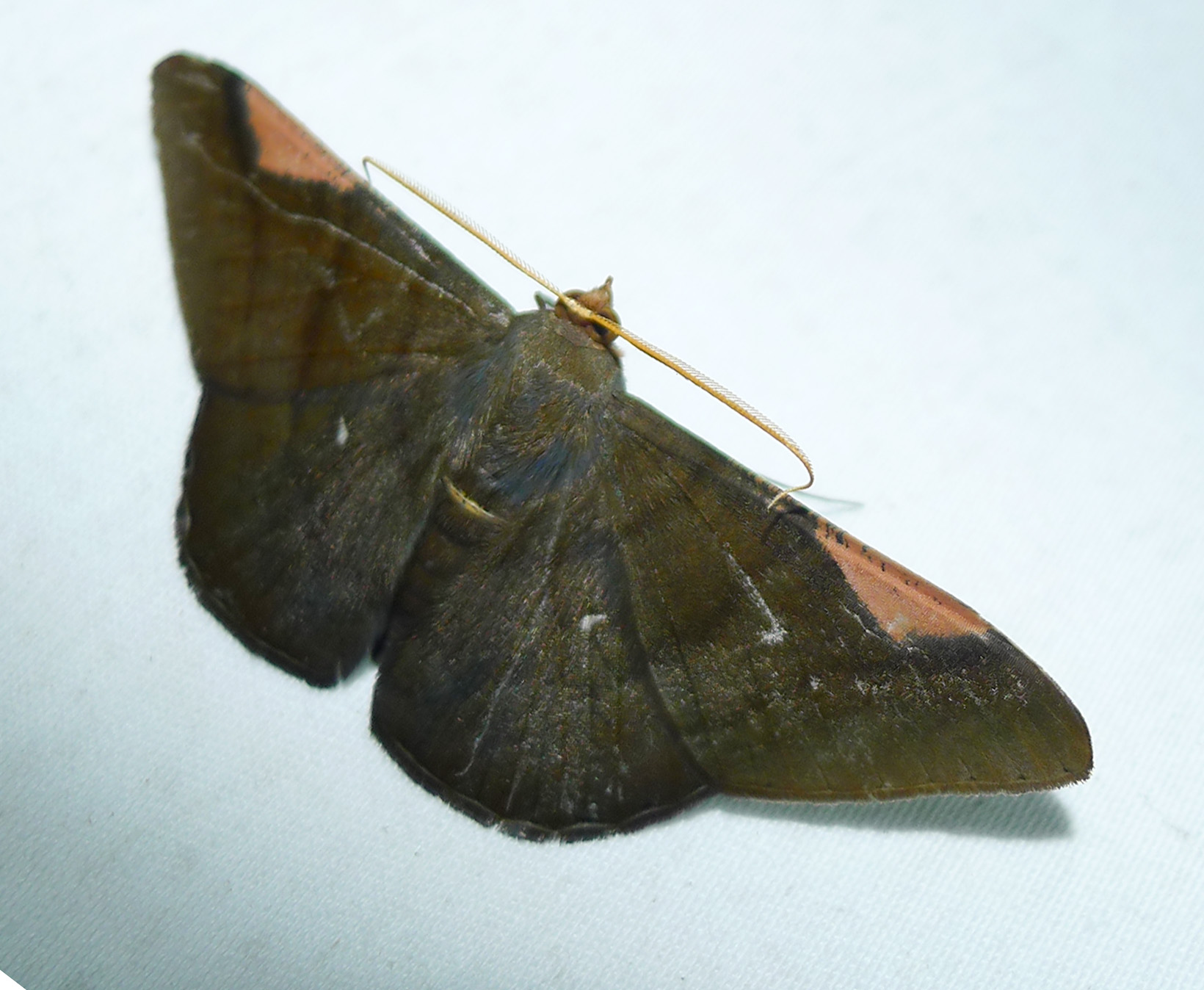
