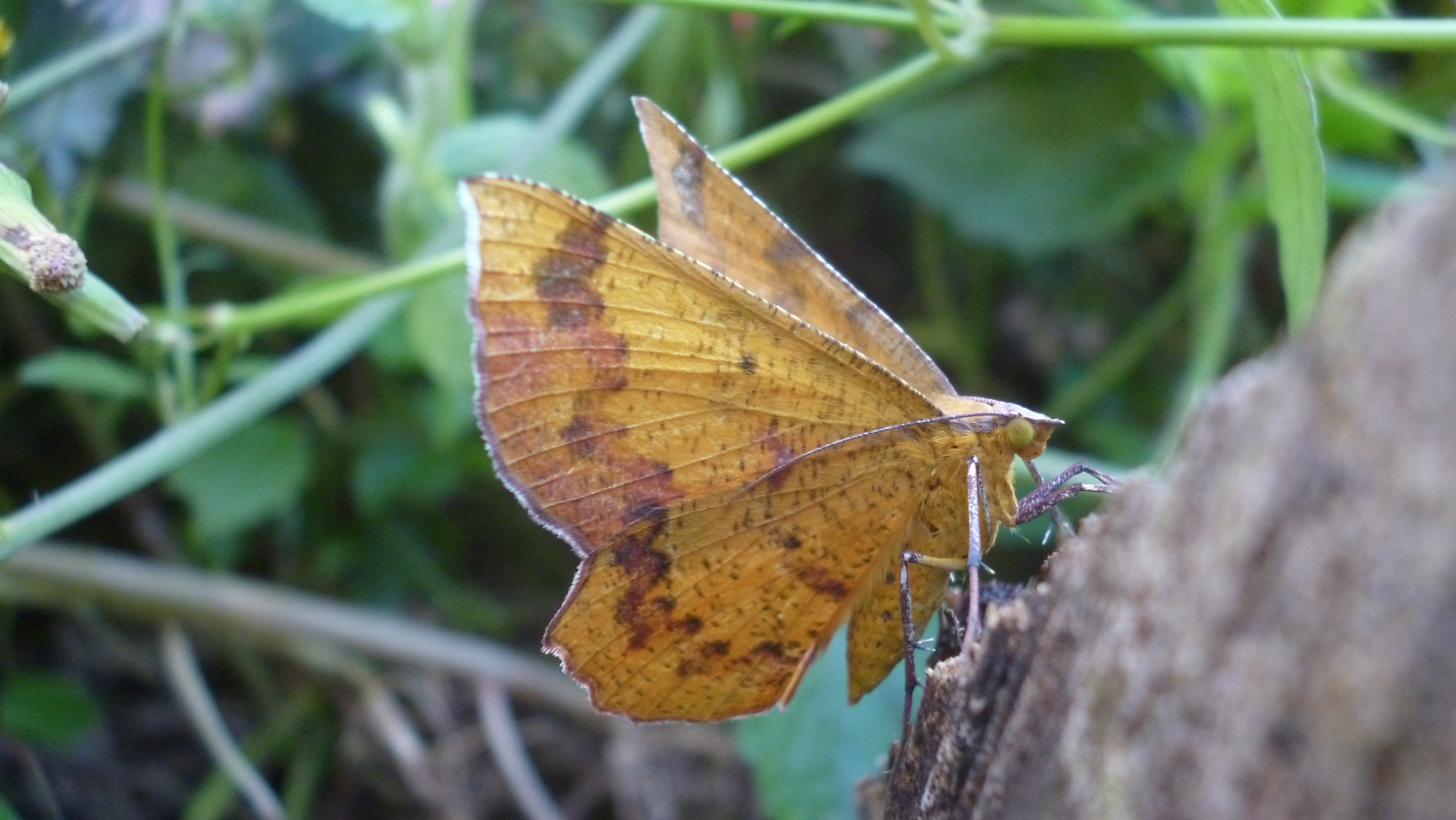

Scientific classification
- Kingdom: Animalia
- Phylum: Arthropoda
- Clade: Pancrustacea
- Class: Insecta
- Order: Lepidoptera
- Family: Geometridae
- Genus: Erastria
- Species: E. decrepitaria

Binomial name
- Erastria decrepitaria (Hübner, 1823)

= Erastria decrepitaria =

Species of moth

Erastria decrepitaria is a species of geometrid moth in the family Geometridae. It is found in Central America, North America, and South America.

The MONA or Hodges number for Erastria decrepitaria is 6702.

== Subspecies ==
These two subspecies belong to the species Erastria decrepitaria:

- Erastria decrepitaria decrepitaria
- Erastria decrepitaria esperanza Barnes & McDunnough, 1916
