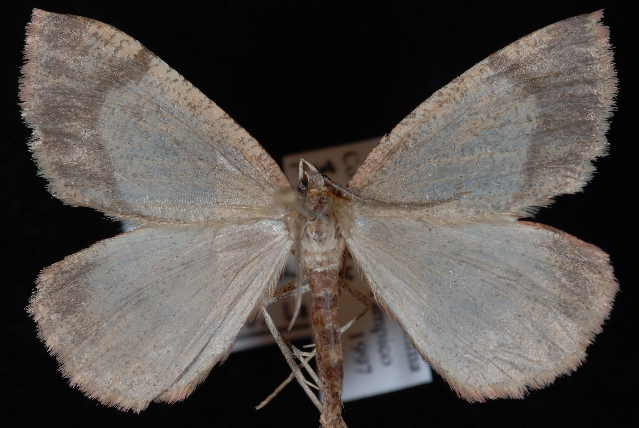
- Sericosema juturnaria

Scientific classification
- Kingdom: Animalia
- Phylum: Arthropoda
- Clade: Pancrustacea
- Class: Insecta
- Order: Lepidoptera
- Family: Geometridae
- Tribe: Caberini
- Genus: Sericosema; Warren, 1895

= Sericosema =

Genus of moths

Sericosema is a genus of moths in the family Geometridae first described by Warren in 1895.

== Species ==
- Sericosema juturnaria (Guenée, 1857)
- Sericosema immaculata (Barnes & McDunnough, 1913)
- Sericosema wilsonensis Cassino & Swett, 1922
- Sericosema simularia (Taylor, 1906)
