= Parilexia =

Scientific classification
- Kingdom: Animalia
- Phylum: Arthropoda
- Class: Insecta
- Order: Lepidoptera
- Family: Geometridae
- Subfamily: Ennominae
- Tribe: Caberini
- Genus: Parilexia; Ferguson, 2009

Genus of moths

Parilexia is a genus of geometrid moths in the family Geometridae. There are at least three described species in Parilexia.

== Species ==
These three species belong to the genus Parilexia:

- Parilexia antilleata Ferguson, 2009
- Parilexia nicetaria (Guenée in Boisduval & Guenée, 1858)
- Parilexia proditata (Walker, 1861)
