= Sericosema immaculata =

Scientific classification
- Kingdom: Animalia
- Phylum: Arthropoda
- Class: Insecta
- Order: Lepidoptera
- Family: Geometridae
- Genus: Sericosema
- Species: S. immaculata

Binomial name
- Sericosema immaculata (Barnes & McDunnough, 1913)

Species of moth

Sericosema immaculata is a moth in the family Geometridae described by William Barnes and James Halliday McDunnough in 1913. It is found in North America.

The MONA or Hodges number for Sericosema immaculata is 6673.
