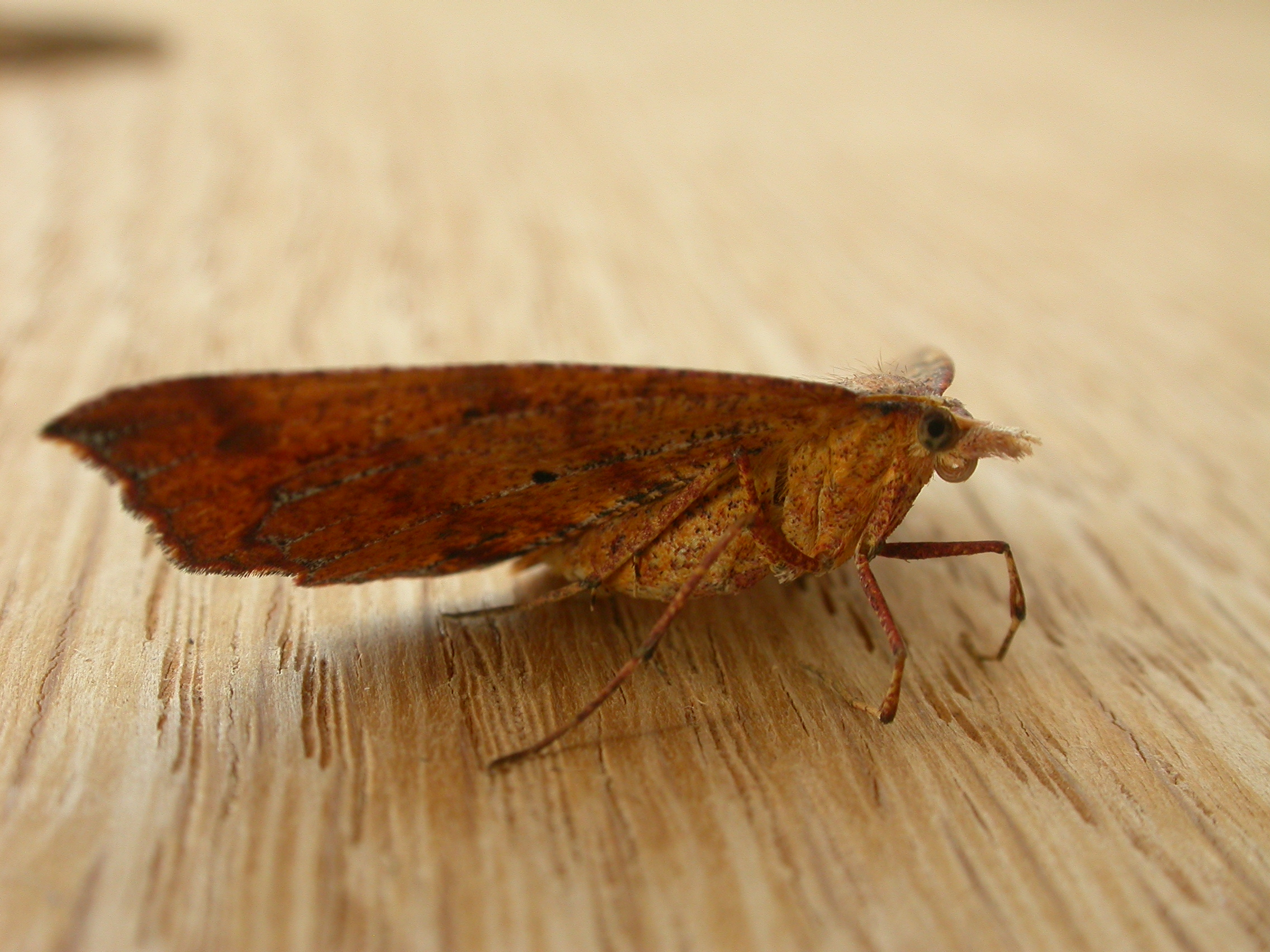
- Rhinodia rostraria

Scientific classification
- Kingdom: Animalia
- Phylum: Arthropoda
- Class: Insecta
- Order: Lepidoptera
- Family: Geometridae
- Tribe: Caberini
- Genus: Rhinodia; Guenée, 1857

= Rhinodia =

Genus of moths

Rhinodia is a genus of moths in the family Geometridae first described by Achille Guenée in 1857. Both species are known from Australia.

== Species ==
- Rhinodia rostraria Guenée, 1857
- Rhinodia undiferaria (Walker, 1866)
