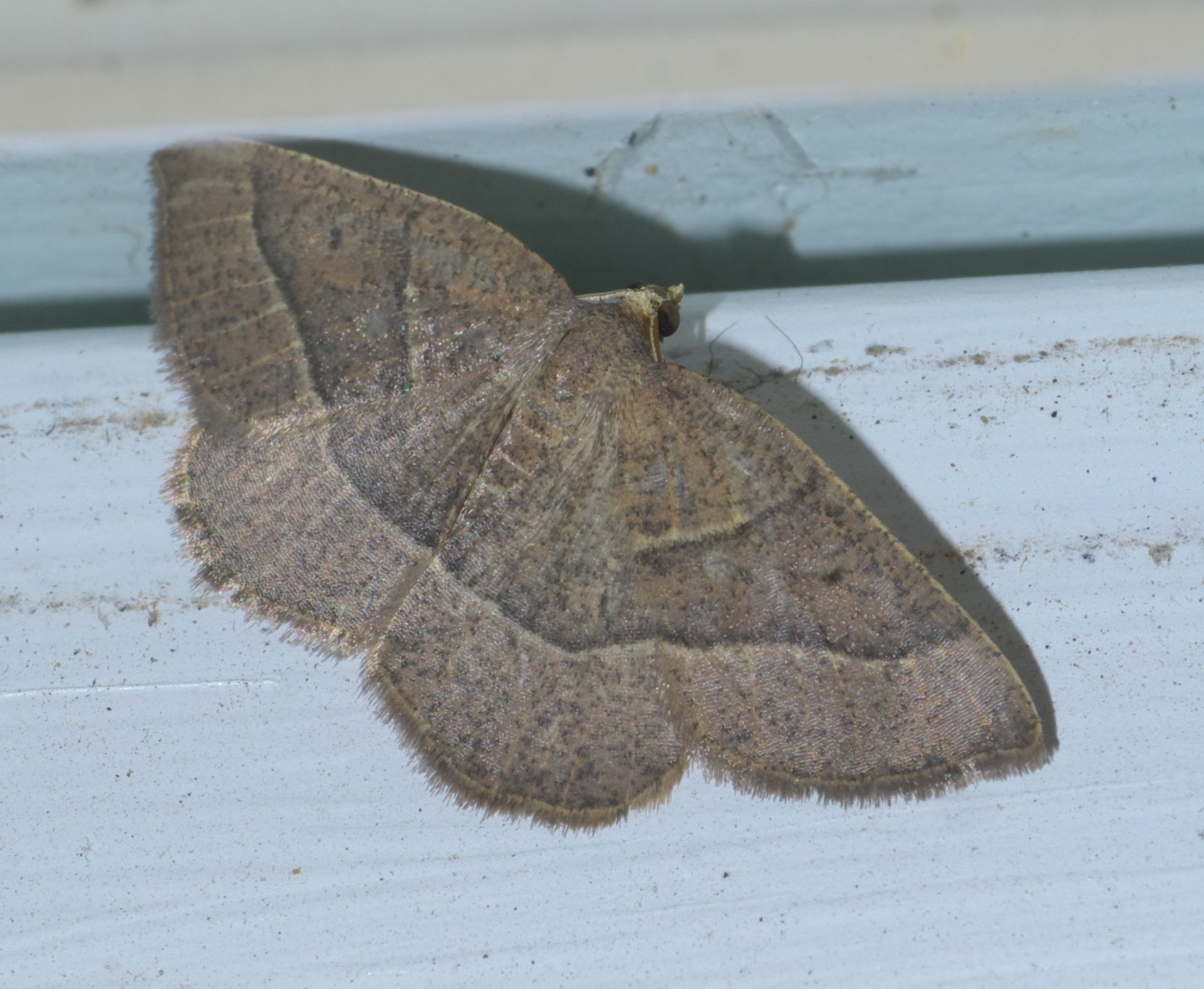

Scientific classification
- Kingdom: Animalia
- Phylum: Arthropoda
- Clade: Pancrustacea
- Class: Insecta
- Order: Lepidoptera
- Family: Geometridae
- Genus: Episemasia
- Species: E. cervinaria

Binomial name
- Episemasia cervinaria (Packard, 1873)

Synonyms
- Caberodes cervinaria Packard 1873

= Episemasia cervinaria =

Species of moth

Episemasia cervinaria, or the Fawn Ruddy, is a species of geometrid moth in the family Geometridae. It was first described by Alpheus Spring Packard in 1873. It is found in the South-central United States.

The forewing length is 10–12.5 mm (0.39–0.49 in).
