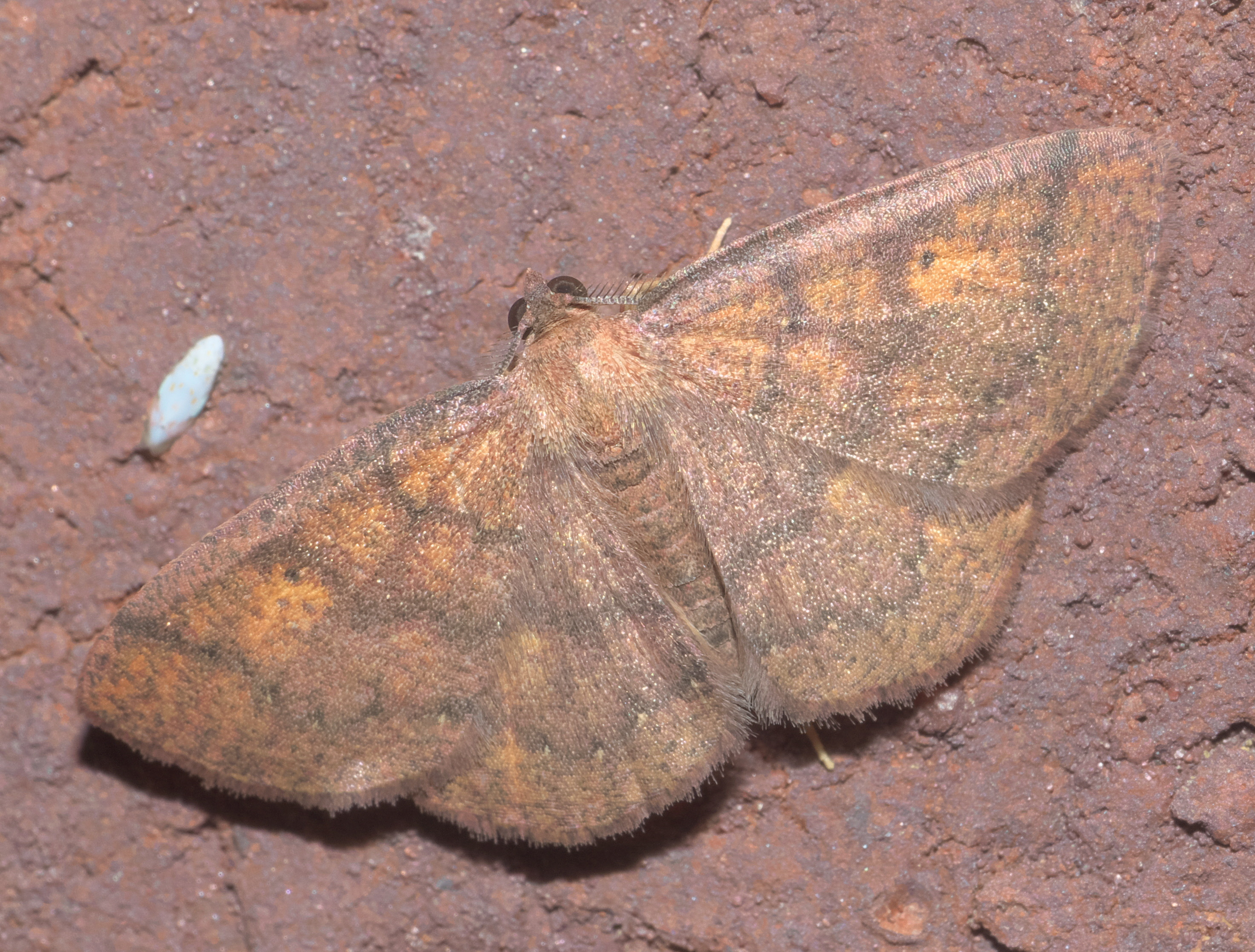

Scientific classification
- Kingdom: Animalia
- Phylum: Arthropoda
- Class: Insecta
- Order: Lepidoptera
- Family: Geometridae
- Tribe: Caberini
- Genus: Ilexia; Ferguson, 2009
- Species: I. intractata

Binomial name
- Ilexia intractata (Walker, 1863)

= Ilexia =

Ilexia intractata

Genus of moths

Ilexia is a genus of geometrid moths in the family Geometridae. It is monotypic, being represented by the single species Ilexia intractata.
