= Pterospoda opuscularia =

Scientific classification
- Domain: Eukaryota
- Kingdom: Animalia
- Phylum: Arthropoda
- Class: Insecta
- Order: Lepidoptera
- Family: Geometridae
- Genus: Pterospoda
- Species: P. opuscularia

Binomial name
- Pterospoda opuscularia (Hulst, 1887)

Species of moth

Pterospoda opuscularia is a species of geometrid moth in the family Geometridae. It is found in North America.

The MONA or Hodges number for Pterospoda opuscularia is 6707.
