= Aplogompha angusta =

Scientific classification
- Kingdom: Animalia
- Phylum: Arthropoda
- Class: Insecta
- Order: Lepidoptera
- Family: Geometridae
- Genus: Aplogompha
- Species: A. angusta

Binomial name
- Aplogompha angusta Dyar, 1914

Species of moth

Aplogompha angusta is a Neotropical geometer moth species of the subfamily Ennominae. It is found in Panama.

The wingspan is about 23 mm for males and 21 mm for females. Adults are similar to Aplogompha costimaculata, but the forewings of the males are long and narrow and the hindwings are moderate (not broadly expanded), while the basal two-thirds of both wings below are washed with yellowish. Females are pale brown above, but with the markings of the males on both sides.
