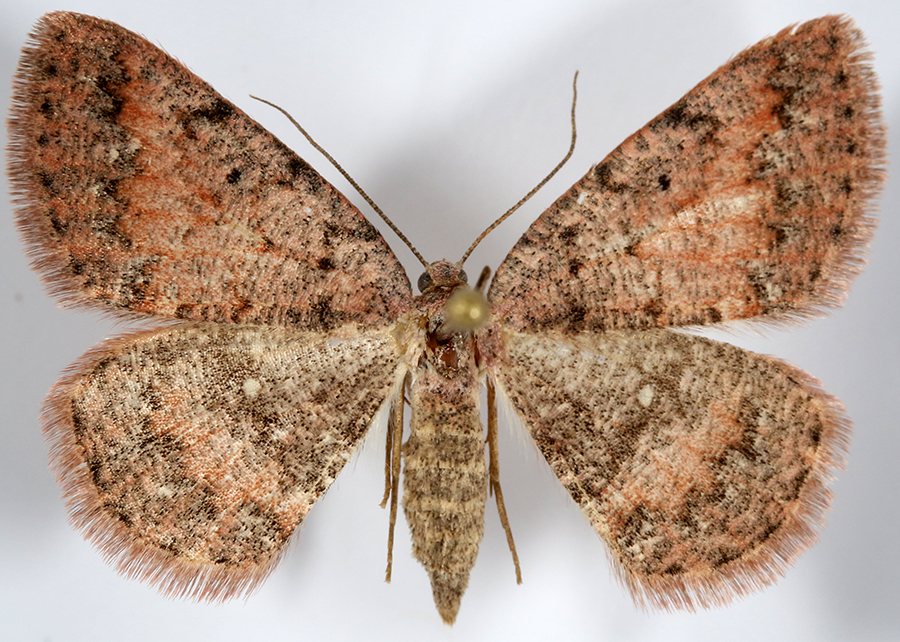

Scientific classification
- Domain: Eukaryota
- Kingdom: Animalia
- Phylum: Arthropoda
- Class: Insecta
- Order: Lepidoptera
- Family: Geometridae
- Genus: Ixala
- Species: I. desperaria

Binomial name
- Ixala desperaria (Hulst, 1887)

= Ixala desperaria =

Species of moth

Ixala desperaria is a species of geometrid moth in the family Geometridae. It is found in North America.

The MONA or Hodges number for Ixala desperaria is 6695.
