= Drepanulatrix nevadaria =

Scientific classification
- Kingdom: Animalia
- Phylum: Arthropoda
- Class: Insecta
- Order: Lepidoptera
- Family: Geometridae
- Genus: Drepanulatrix
- Species: D. nevadaria

Binomial name
- Drepanulatrix nevadaria (Hulst, 1888)

Species of moth

Drepanulatrix nevadaria is a species of geometrid moth in the family Geometridae. It is found in North America.

The MONA or Hodges number for Drepanulatrix nevadaria is 6687.
