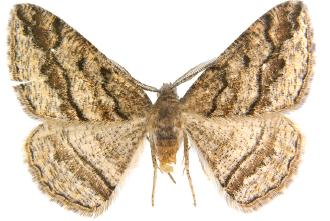
- Pterospoda nigrescens

Scientific classification
- Kingdom: Animalia
- Phylum: Arthropoda
- Class: Insecta
- Order: Lepidoptera
- Family: Geometridae
- Tribe: Caberini
- Genus: Pterospoda; Dyar, 1903

Synonyms
- Spodoptera Hulst, 1896 (preocc. Guenée, 1852)

= Pterospoda =

Genus of moths

Pterospoda is a genus of moths in the family Geometridae first described by Harrison Gray Dyar Jr. in 1903.

== Species ==
- Pterospoda kunzei (Hulst, 1898)
- Pterospoda nigrescens (Hulst, 1898)
- Pterospoda opuscularia (Hulst, 1887)
