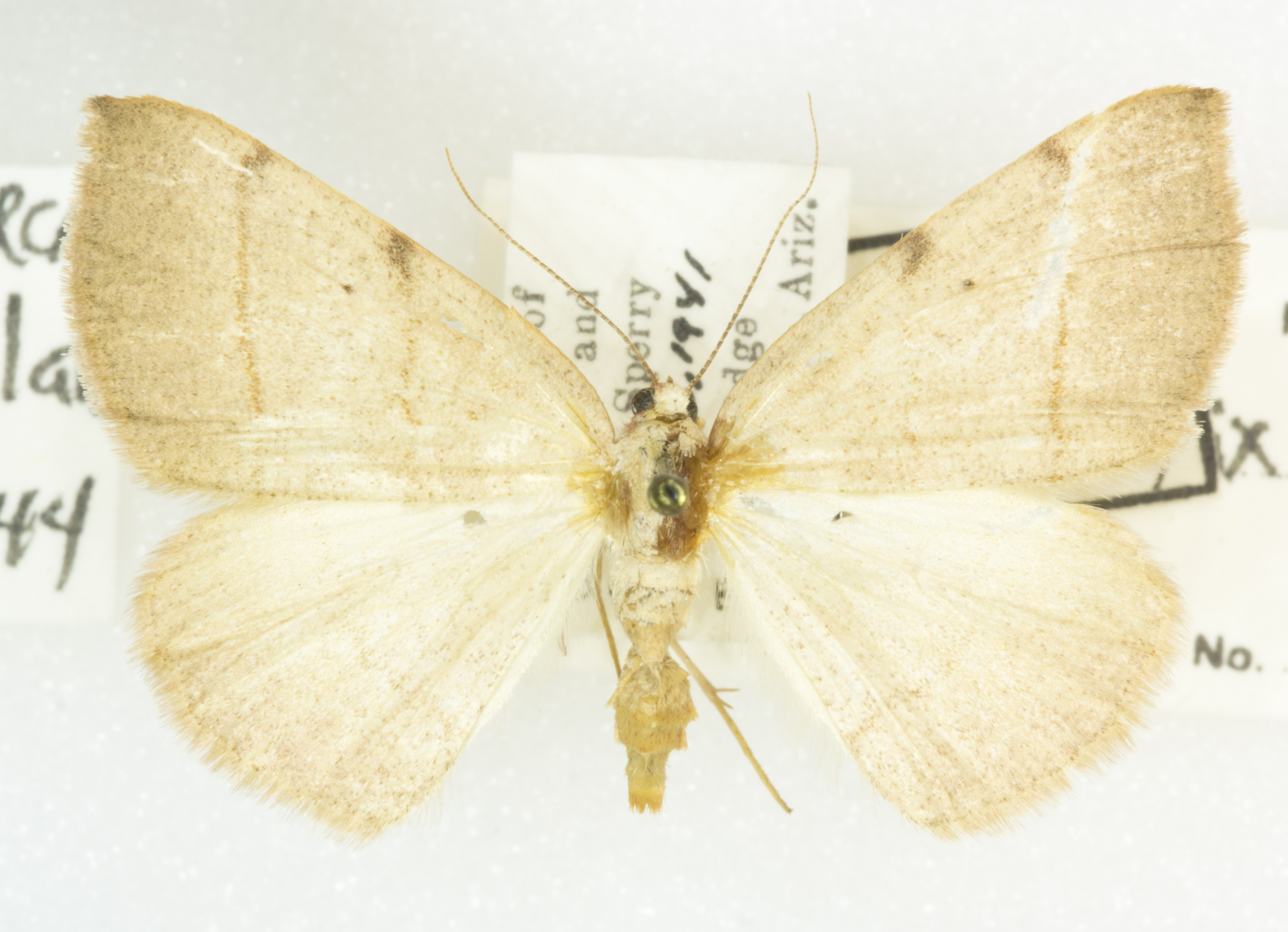
- Drepanulatrix bifilata

Scientific classification
- Kingdom: Animalia
- Phylum: Arthropoda
- Class: Insecta
- Order: Lepidoptera
- Family: Geometridae
- Genus: Drepanulatrix
- Species: D. bifilata

Binomial name
- Drepanulatrix bifilata (Hulst, 1880)

= Drepanulatrix bifilata =

Species of moth

Drepanulatrix bifilata is a species of geometrid moth in the family Geometridae. It is found in North America.

The MONA or Hodges number for Drepanulatrix bifilata is 6684.
