= Erastria coloraria =

Scientific classification
- Kingdom: Animalia
- Phylum: Arthropoda
- Class: Insecta
- Order: Lepidoptera
- Family: Geometridae
- Genus: Erastria
- Species: E. coloraria

Binomial name
- Erastria coloraria (Fabricius, 1798)

Species of moth

Erastria coloraria, the broad-lined erastria, is a species of moth in the family Geometridae (geometrid moths), in the superfamily Geometroidea (geometrid and swallowtail moths). The species was described by Johan Christian Fabricius in 1798. It is found in North America.

The MONA or Hodges number for Erastria coloraria is 6704.
