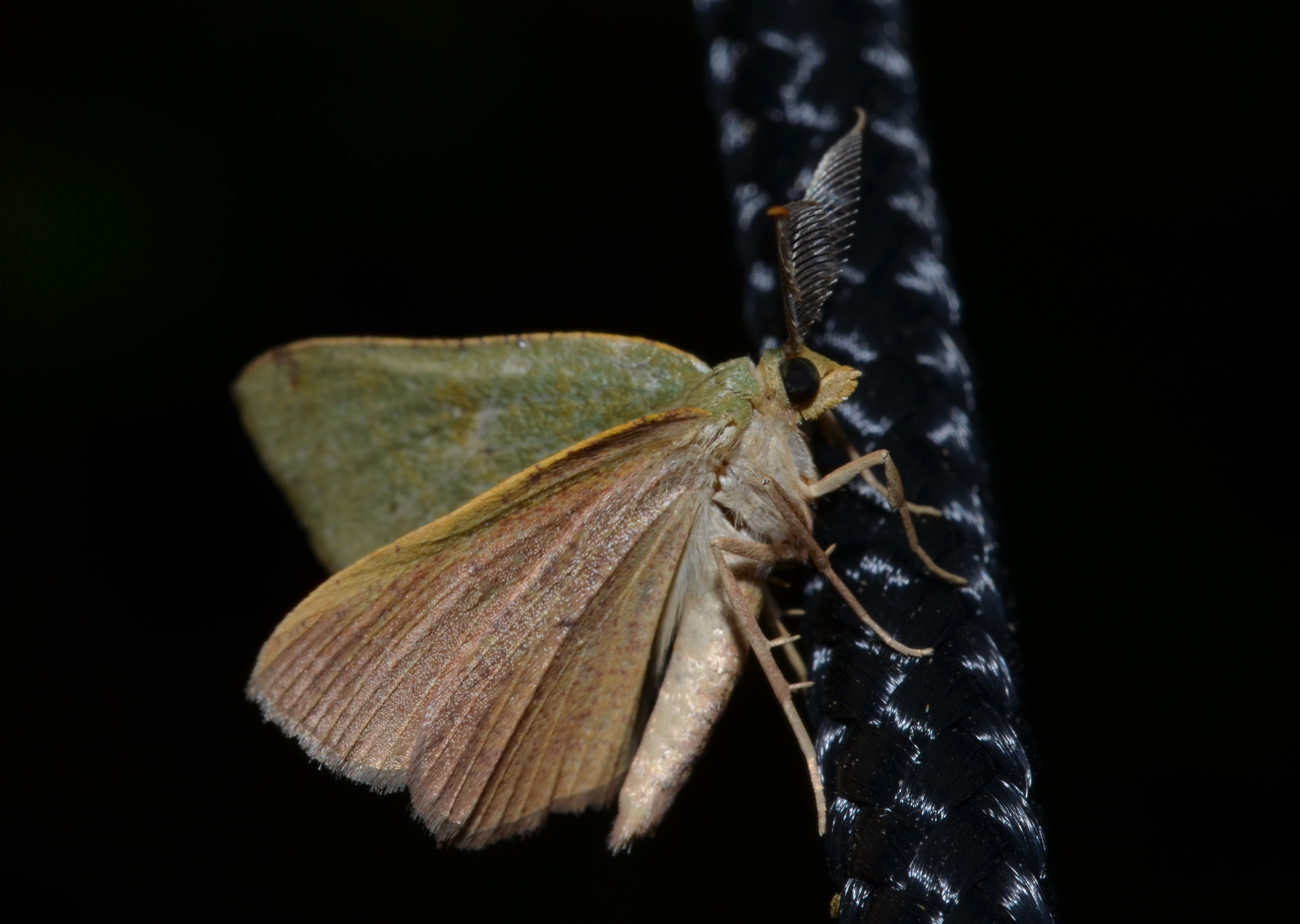
- Chloraspilates bicoloraria

Scientific classification
- Kingdom: Animalia
- Phylum: Arthropoda
- Clade: Pancrustacea
- Class: Insecta
- Order: Lepidoptera
- Family: Geometridae
- Tribe: Caberini
- Genus: Chloraspilates; Packard, 1876

= Chloraspilates =

Genus of moths

Chloraspilates is a genus of moths in the family Geometridae.

== Species ==
- Chloraspilates bicoloraria Packard, 1876
- Chloraspilates minima (Hulst, 1898)
