= Pterospoda kunzei =

Scientific classification
- Domain: Eukaryota
- Kingdom: Animalia
- Phylum: Arthropoda
- Class: Insecta
- Order: Lepidoptera
- Family: Geometridae
- Genus: Pterospoda
- Species: P. kunzei

Binomial name
- Pterospoda kunzei (Hulst, 1898)

Species of moth

Pterospoda kunzei is a species of geometrid moth in the family Geometridae. It is found in North America.

The MONA or Hodges number for Pterospoda kunzei is 6708.
