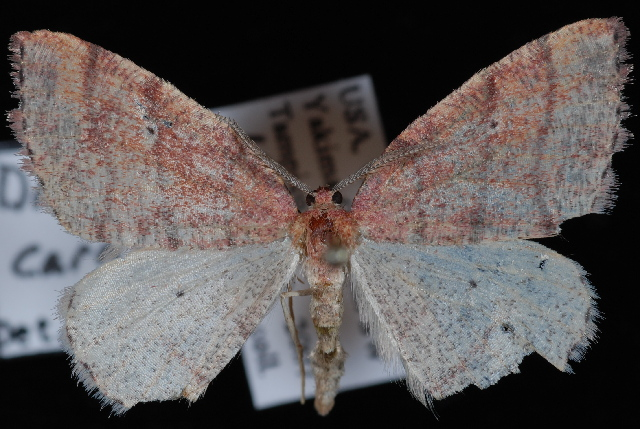
- Drepanulatrix falcataria

Scientific classification
- Kingdom: Animalia
- Phylum: Arthropoda
- Class: Insecta
- Order: Lepidoptera
- Family: Geometridae
- Tribe: Caberini
- Genus: Drepanulatrix; Gumppenberg, 1887

Synonyms
- Aethyctera Hulst, 1896

= Drepanulatrix =

Genus of moths

Drepanulatrix is a genus of moths in the family Geometridae.

== Species ==
- Drepanulatrix baueraria Sperry, 1948
- Drepanulatrix bifilata (Hulst, 1880)
- Drepanulatrix carnearia (Hulst, 1888)
- Drepanulatrix falcataria (Packard, 1873)
- Drepanulatrix foeminaria (Guenée, 1857)
- Drepanulatrix garneri Blanchard & Knudson, 1985
- Drepanulatrix hulstii (Dyar, 1903)
- Drepanulatrix monicaria (Guenée, 1857)
- Drepanulatrix nevadaria (Hulst, 1888)
- Drepanulatrix quadraria (Grote, 1882)
- Drepanulatrix secundaria Barnes & McDunnough, 1916
- Drepanulatrix unicalcararia (Guenée, 1857)
