= Aplogompha noctilaria =

Scientific classification
- Kingdom: Animalia
- Phylum: Arthropoda
- Class: Insecta
- Order: Lepidoptera
- Family: Geometridae
- Genus: Aplogompha
- Species: A. noctilaria

Binomial name
- Aplogompha noctilaria (Schaus, 1901)

Synonyms
- Cambogia noctilaria Schaus, 1901; Eois noctilaria

Species of moth

Aplogompha noctilaria is a moth in the family Geometridae. It is found in Brazil.
