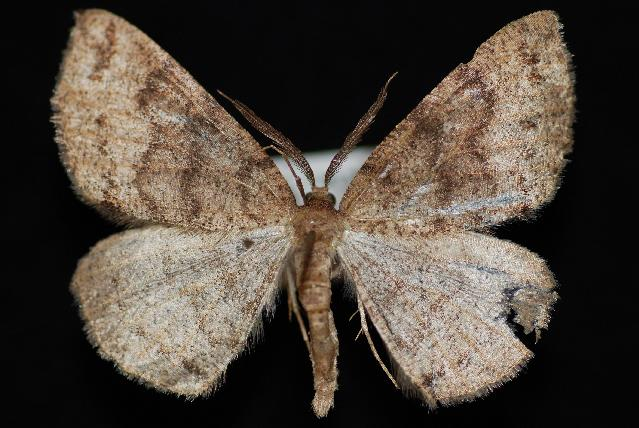
- Apodrepanulatrix litaria

Scientific classification
- Kingdom: Animalia
- Phylum: Arthropoda
- Class: Insecta
- Order: Lepidoptera
- Family: Geometridae
- Tribe: Caberini
- Genus: Apodrepanulatrix; Rindge, 1949

= Apodrepanulatrix =

Genus of geometer moths

Apodrepanulatrix is a genus of moths in the family Geometridae.

== Species ==
- Apodrepanulatrix liberaria (Walker, 1860)
- Apodrepanulatrix litaria (Hulst, 1887)
