= Aspilobapta =

Scientific classification
- Kingdom: Animalia
- Phylum: Arthropoda
- Class: Insecta
- Order: Lepidoptera
- Family: Geometridae
- Tribe: Caberini
- Genus: Aspilobapta; Djakonov, 1952

Genus of moths

Aspilobapta is a genus of moths in the family Geometridae.

== Species ==
- Aspilobapta sylvicola Djakonov, 1952
