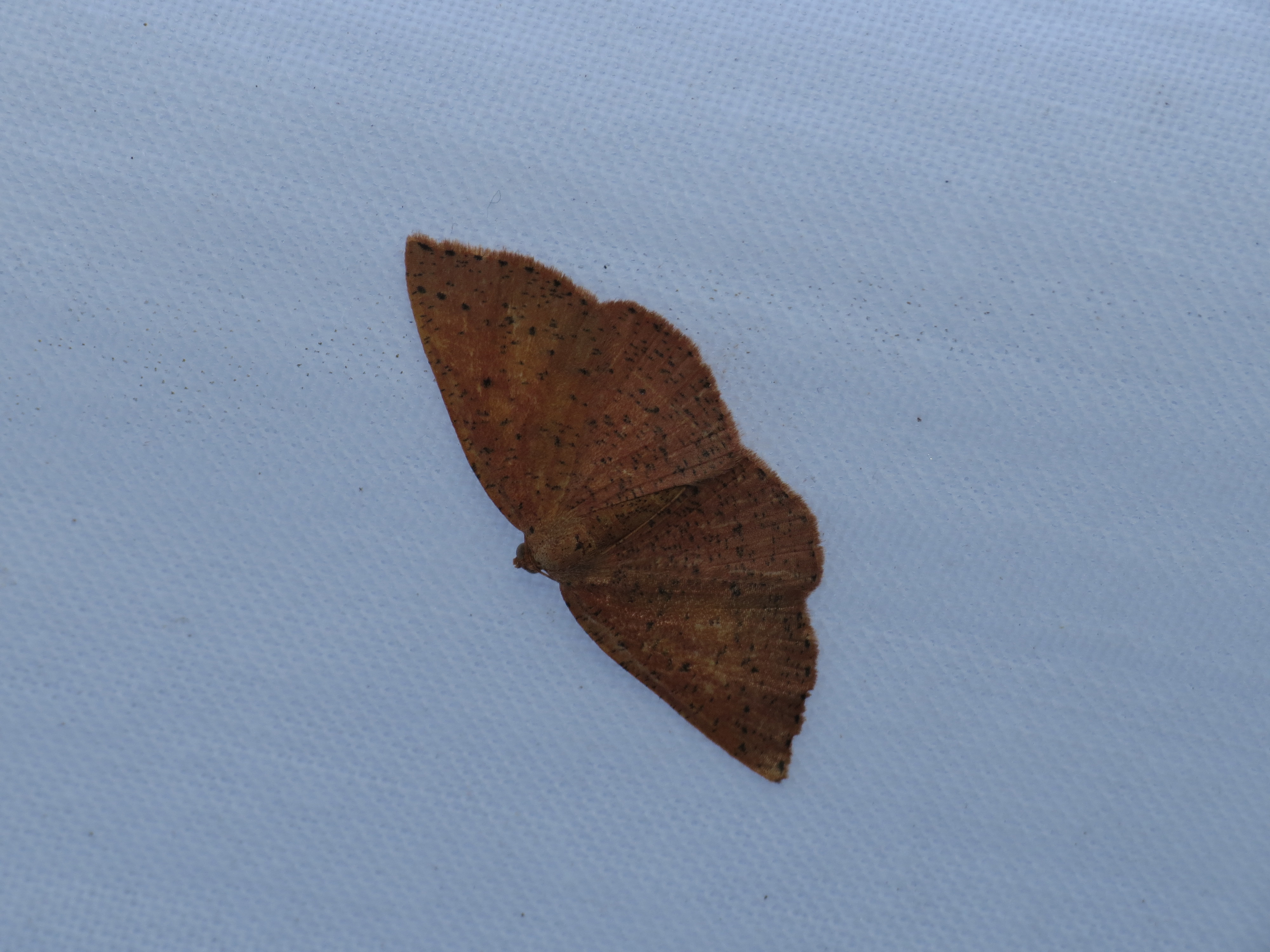
- Episemasia solitaria

Scientific classification
- Kingdom: Animalia
- Phylum: Arthropoda
- Class: Insecta
- Order: Lepidoptera
- Family: Geometridae
- Tribe: Caberini
- Genus: Episemasia; Hulst, 1896

= Episemasia =

Genus of moths

Episemasia is a genus of moths in the family Geometridae first described by George Duryea Hulst in 1896.

== Species ==
- Episemasia cervinaria (Packard, 1873)
- Episemasia solitaria (Walker, 1861)
