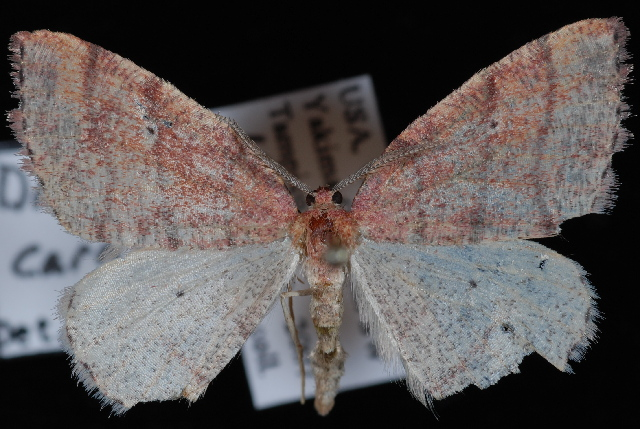
- Drepanulatrix falcataria in 2007

Scientific classification
- Kingdom: Animalia
- Phylum: Arthropoda
- Clade: Pancrustacea
- Class: Insecta
- Order: Lepidoptera
- Family: Geometridae
- Genus: Drepanulatrix
- Species: D. falcataria

Binomial name
- Drepanulatrix falcataria (Packard, 1873)

= Drepanulatrix falcataria =

Species of moth

Drepanulatrix falcataria is a species of geometrid moth in the family Geometridae. It is found in North America.

The MONA or Hodges number for Drepanulatrix falcataria is 6689.

== Description ==
Drepanulatrix falcataria has a dusty brown pattern on its wings. The pattern includes small black dots and varying shades of brown and tan.
