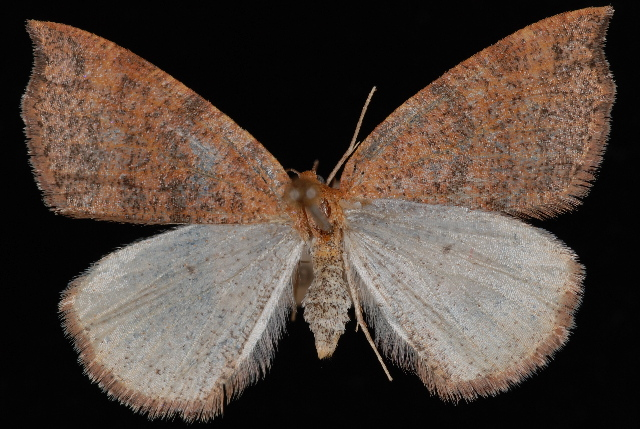

Scientific classification
- Domain: Eukaryota
- Kingdom: Animalia
- Phylum: Arthropoda
- Class: Insecta
- Order: Lepidoptera
- Family: Geometridae
- Genus: Drepanulatrix
- Species: D. secundaria

Binomial name
- Drepanulatrix secundaria Barnes & McDunnough, 1916

= Drepanulatrix secundaria =

Species of moth

Drepanulatrix secundaria is a species of moth in the family Geometridae first described by William Barnes and James Halliday McDunnough in 1916. It is found in North America.

The MONA or Hodges number for Drepanulatrix secundaria is 6690.
