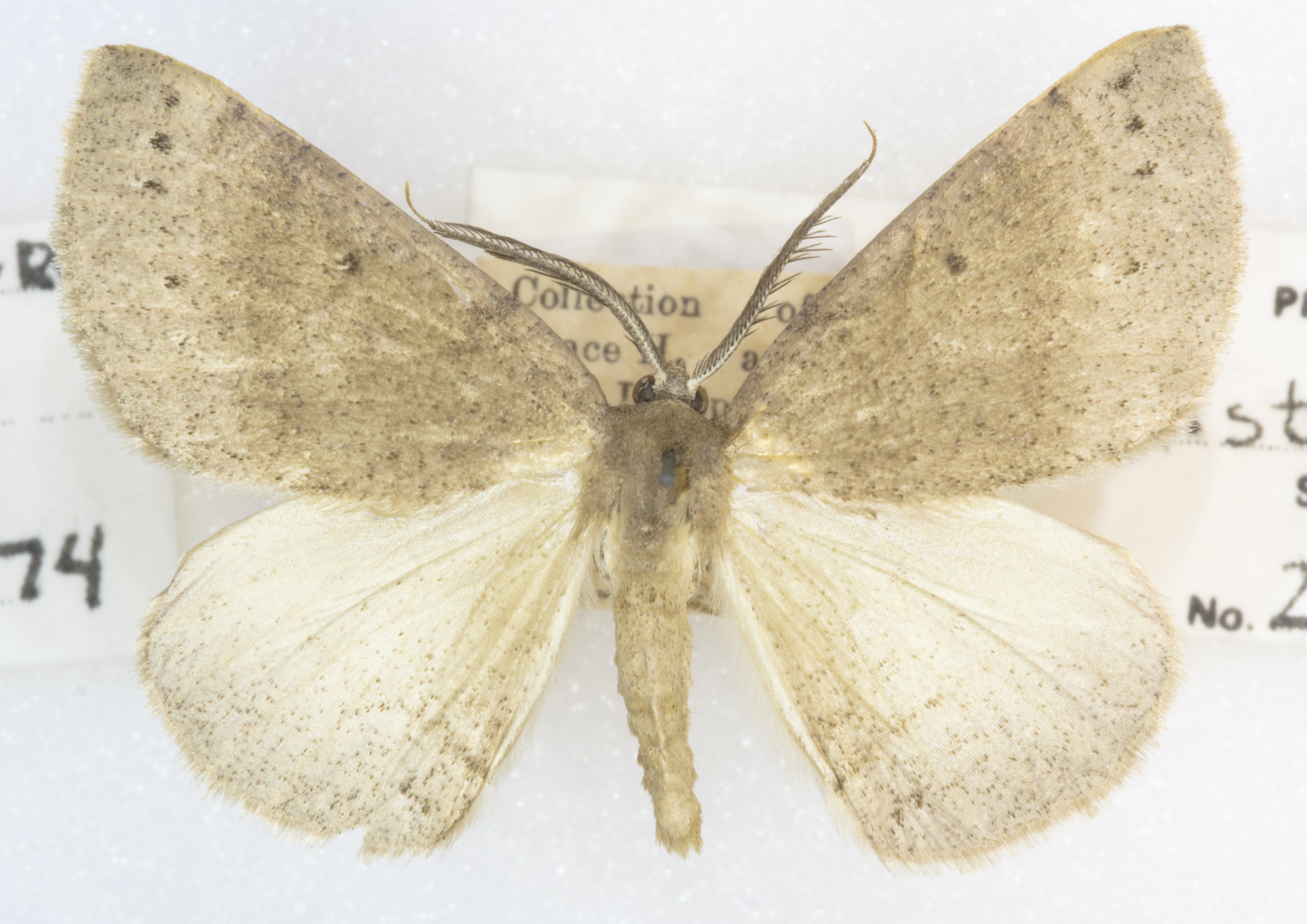

Scientific classification
- Kingdom: Animalia
- Phylum: Arthropoda
- Class: Insecta
- Order: Lepidoptera
- Family: Geometridae
- Genus: Drepanulatrix
- Species: D. hulstii

Binomial name
- Drepanulatrix hulstii (Dyar, 1904)

= Drepanulatrix hulstii =

Species of moth

Drepanulatrix hulstii is a species of geometrid moth in the family Geometridae. It was described by Harrison Gray Dyar Jr. in 1904 and is found in North America.

The MONA or Hodges number for Drepanulatrix hulstii is 6683.
