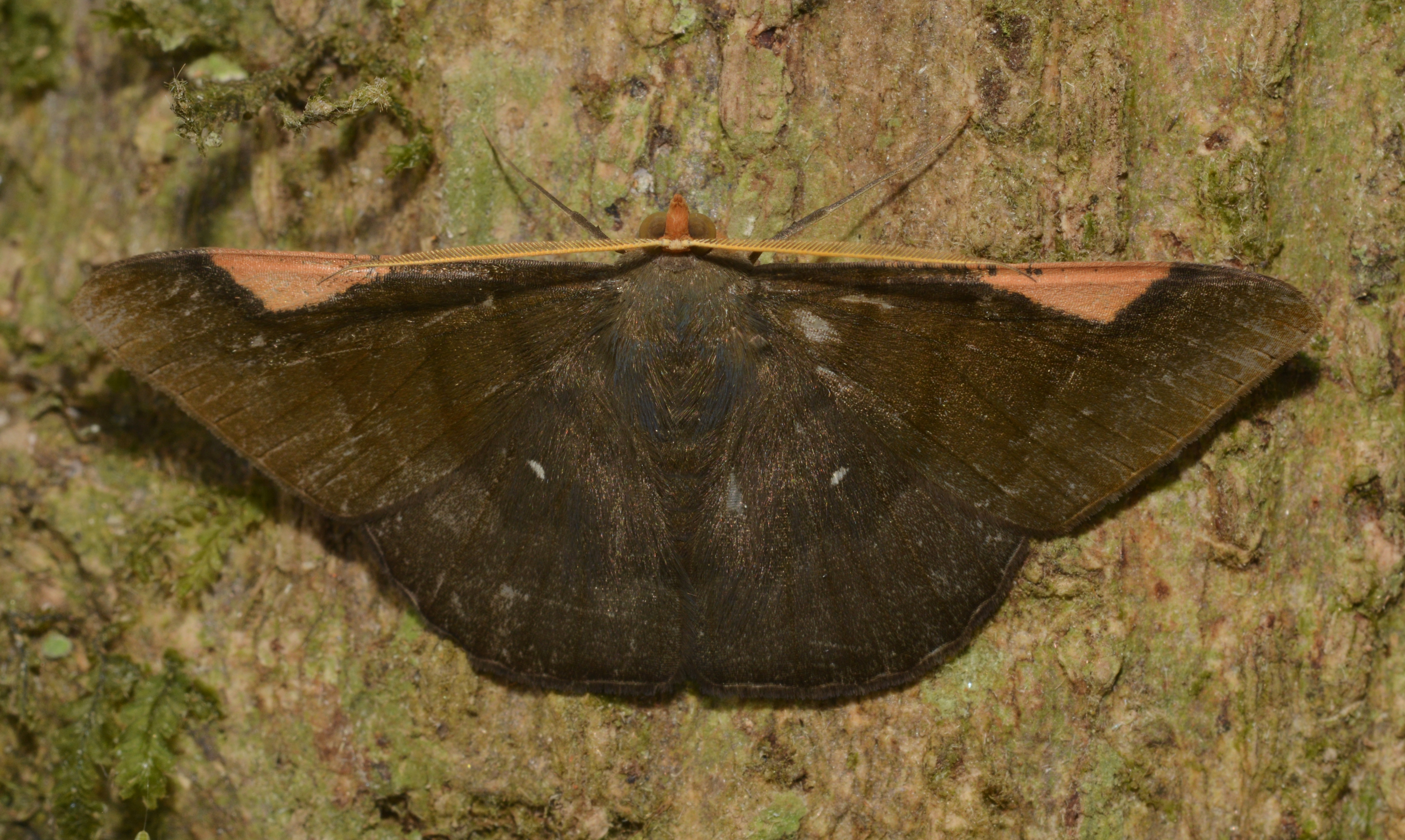

Scientific classification
- Kingdom: Animalia
- Phylum: Arthropoda
- Class: Insecta
- Order: Lepidoptera
- Family: Geometridae
- Tribe: Sphacelodini
- Genus: Sphacelodes; Guenée, 1857

= Sphacelodes =

Genus of moths

Sphacelodes is a genus of moths in the family Geometridae first described by Achille Guenée in 1857.

== Species ==
- Sphacelodes vulneraria (Hübner, 1819–21)
- Sphacelodes fusilineatus (Walker, 1860)
- Sphacelodes haitiaria Oberthür, 1923
