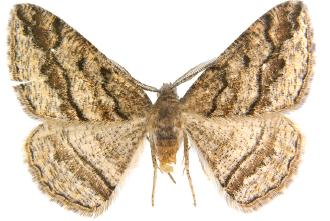
- Male
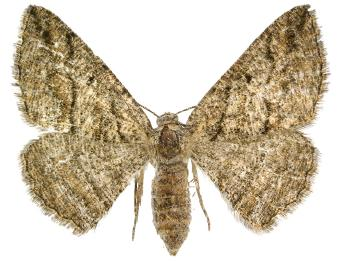
- Female

Scientific classification
- Domain: Eukaryota
- Kingdom: Animalia
- Phylum: Arthropoda
- Class: Insecta
- Order: Lepidoptera
- Family: Geometridae
- Genus: Pterospoda
- Species: P. nigrescens

Binomial name
- Pterospoda nigrescens (Hulst, 1898)

Synonyms
- Selidosema nigrescens Hulst, 1898; Ixala klotsi Sperry, 1940

= Pterospoda nigrescens =

Species of moth

Pterospoda nigrescens is a species of moth of the family Geometridae. It occurs at moderate elevations in arid scrub and open woodland habitat, ranging from south-eastern Arizona and the Edwards Plateau of west-central Texas south to at least Durango, Mexico. It is not known from New Mexico, but should occur there.

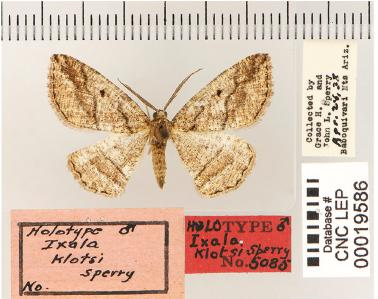
The holotype of Ixala klotsi, now considered a synonym of Pterospoda nigrescens

The wingspan is about 24 mm. There are at least two annual flights, primarily in April and August in Arizona.

The larvae have been reared on Condalia species, probably Condalia warnockii var. kearneyana.
