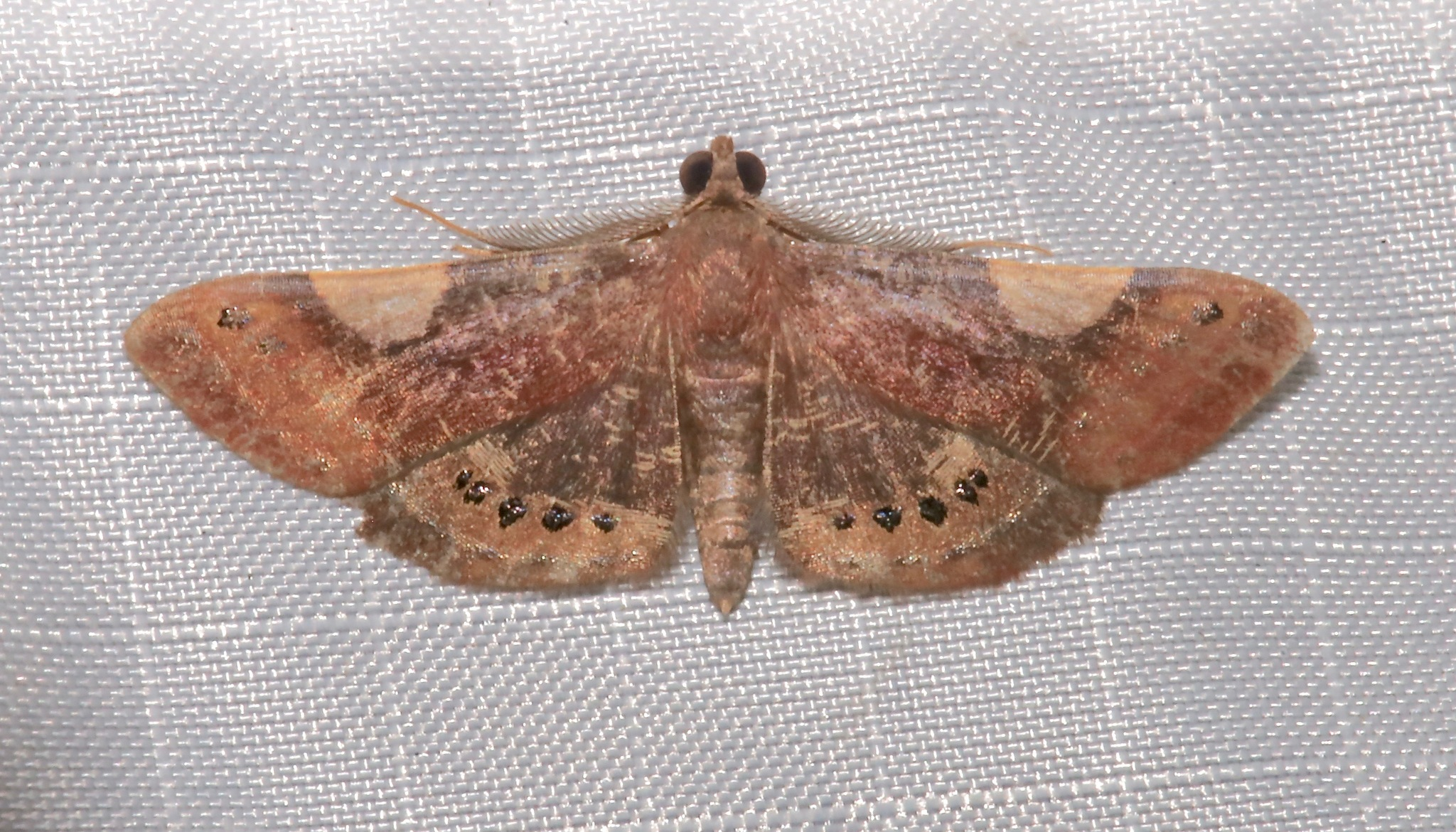
- Aplogompha argentilinea

Scientific classification
- Kingdom: Animalia
- Phylum: Arthropoda
- Clade: Pancrustacea
- Class: Insecta
- Order: Lepidoptera
- Family: Geometridae
- Subfamily: Ennominae
- Genus: Aplogompha; Warren, 1897

Synonyms
- Trichogompha Warren, 1897

= Aplogompha =

Genus of geometer moths

Aplogompha is a genus of moths in the family Geometridae.

== Species ==
- Aplogompha angusta Dyar, 1914
- Aplogompha argentilinea Schaus, 1911
- Aplogompha aurifera Thierry-Mieg, 1904
- Aplogompha chotaria Schaus, 1898
- Aplogompha costimaculata (Warren, 1900)
- Aplogompha frena Dognin, 1899
- Aplogompha joevinaria (Schaus, 1923)
- Aplogompha laeta Warren, 1905
- Aplogompha lafayi (Dognin, 1889)
- Aplogompha noctilaria (Schaus, 1901)
- Aplogompha opulenta (Thierry-Mieg, 1892)
- Aplogompha riofrio (Dognin, 1889)
- Aplogompha saumayaria (Schaus, 1923)
- Aplogompha yerna Dognin, 1899
