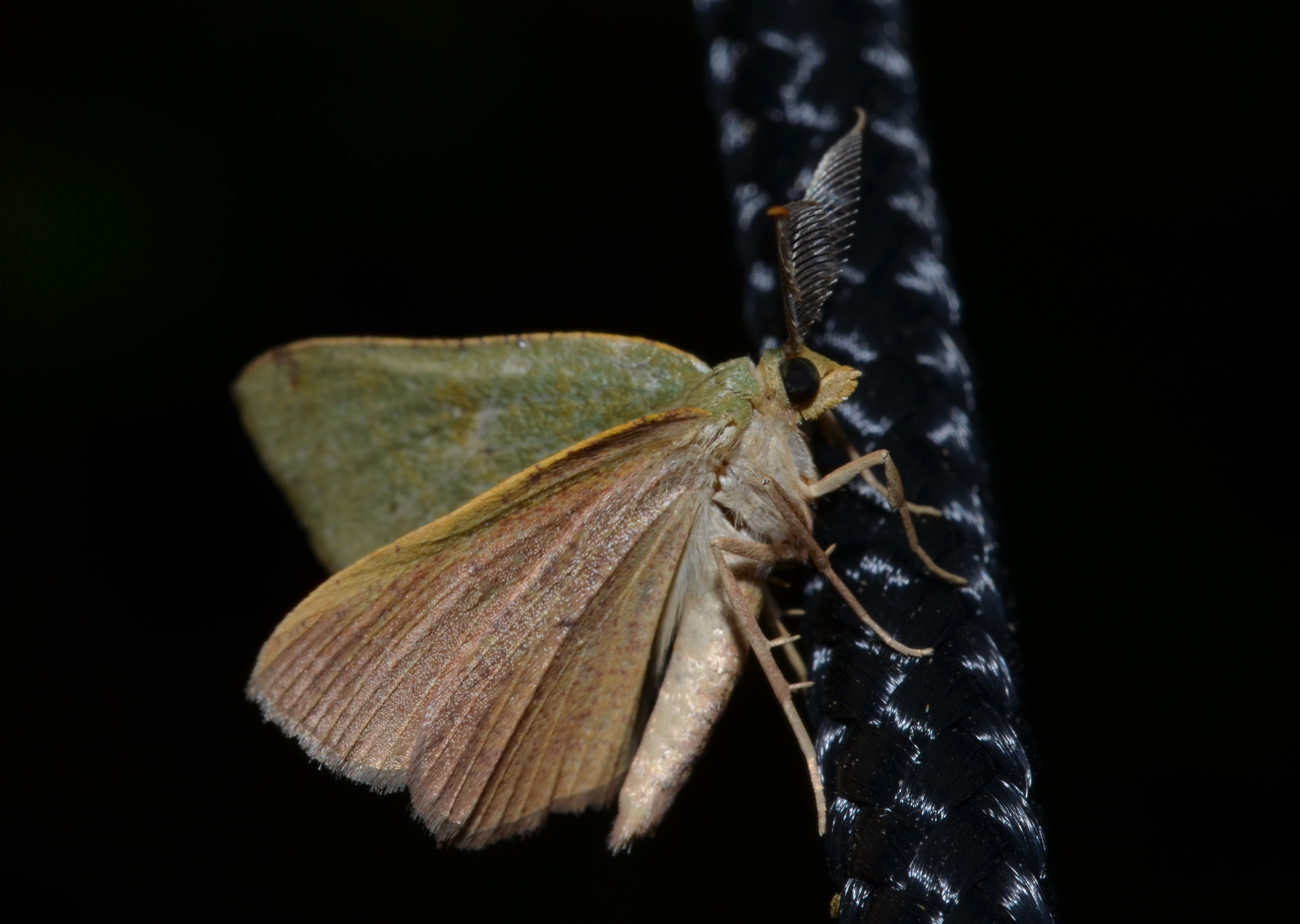

Scientific classification
- Kingdom: Animalia
- Phylum: Arthropoda
- Class: Insecta
- Order: Lepidoptera
- Family: Geometridae
- Subfamily: Ennominae
- Tribe: Caberini

Synonyms
- Sphacelodini Forbes, 1948

= Caberini =

Tribe of moths

Caberini is a tribe of geometrid moths in the family Geometridae. There are at least 50 described species in Caberini.

Taxonomic note:

- Molecular analyses by Sihvonen et al. (2011) supports separating the tribe Baptini from the Caberini. Research by Pitkin (2002) supports the view that Caberini and Baptini should be united, but notes that further study of immature stages is needed.

== Genera ==
- Aplogompha Warren, 1897
- Apodrepanulatrix Rindge, 1949
- Aspilobapta Djakonov, 1952
- Cabera Treitschke, 1825
- Chloraspilates Packard, 1876
- Covellia Ferguson, 2009
- Drepanulatrix Gumppenberg, 1887
- Episemasia Hulst, 1896
- Erastria Hübner, 1813
- Eudrepanulatrix Rindge, 1949
- Ilexia Ferguson, 2009
- Ixala Hulst, 1896
- Numia Guenée, 1858
- Parilexia Ferguson, 2009
- Pterospoda Dyar, 1903
- Rhinodia Guenée, 1857
- Sericosema Warren, 1895
- Sphacelodes Guenée, 1858
- Stergamataea Hulst, 1896
- Thysanopyga Herrich-Schäffer, 1855
