= A. impunctus =

A. impunctus may refer to:

- Abacetus impunctus, a ground beetle
- Ammalo impunctus, a synonym of Ammalo helops, a moth found in the Americas
