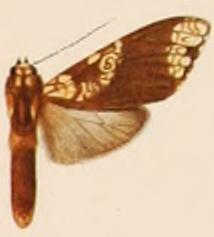

Scientific classification
- Domain: Eukaryota
- Kingdom: Animalia
- Phylum: Arthropoda
- Class: Insecta
- Order: Lepidoptera
- Superfamily: Noctuoidea
- Family: Erebidae
- Subfamily: Arctiinae
- Genus: Aemilia
- Species: A. affinis

Binomial name
- Aemilia affinis (Rothschild, 1909)

Synonyms
- Carathis affinis Rothschild, 1909 (not Pachydota affinis Rothschild, 1909)

= Aemilia affinis =

Species of moth

Aemilia affinis is a moth of the family Erebidae first described by Walter Rothschild in 1909. It is found in Colombia, Venezuela, Bolivia and Peru.
