= Amastus popayanensis =

Scientific classification
- Domain: Eukaryota
- Kingdom: Animalia
- Phylum: Arthropoda
- Class: Insecta
- Order: Lepidoptera
- Superfamily: Noctuoidea
- Family: Erebidae
- Subfamily: Arctiinae
- Genus: Amastus
- Species: A. popayanensis

Binomial name
- Amastus popayanensis Vincent, 2006

Synonyms
- Amastus lehmanni Rothschild, 1916 (preocc.); Hemihyalea lehmanni

Species of moth

Amastus popayanensis is a moth of the family Erebidae. It was described by Rothschild in 1916. It is found in Colombia.

== Taxonomy ==
There is some dispute over whether the species belongs in Amastus or Hemihyalea.
