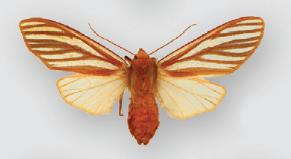
- Female
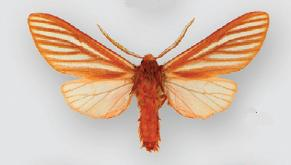
- Male

Scientific classification
- Domain: Eukaryota
- Kingdom: Animalia
- Phylum: Arthropoda
- Class: Insecta
- Order: Lepidoptera
- Superfamily: Noctuoidea
- Family: Erebidae
- Subfamily: Arctiinae
- Genus: Pseudohemihyalea
- Species: P. syracosia

Binomial name
- Pseudohemihyalea syracosia (H. Druce, 1889)

Synonyms
- Halisidota syracosia H. Druce, 1889

= Pseudohemihyalea syracosia =

Species of moth

Pseudohemihyalea syracosia is a moth of the family Erebidae first described by Herbert Druce in 1889. It was formerly believed to be a synonym of Pseudohemihyalea ambigua. It is found from Michoacán, Mexico to Honduras.

The length of the forewings is about 20 mm. Adults are on wing from May to September.

The larvae probably feed on Pinus species.
