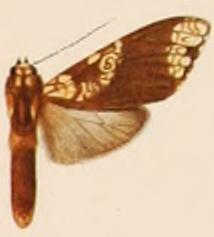
- Aemilia affinis.JPG

Scientific classification
- Domain: Eukaryota
- Kingdom: Animalia
- Phylum: Arthropoda
- Class: Insecta
- Order: Lepidoptera
- Superfamily: Noctuoidea
- Family: Erebidae
- Subfamily: Arctiinae
- Subtribe: Phaegopterina
- Genus: Aemilia; Kirby, 1892

Type species
- Ameles rubriplaga Walker, 1855

Synonyms
- Ameles Walker, 1855 (non Burmeister, [1838]: preoccupied)

= Aemilia (moth) =

Genus of moths

Aemilia is a genus of tiger moths in the family Erebidae described by William Forsell Kirby in 1892. It was initially named Ameles, but this name properly refers to a praying mantis genus.

A group of species closely related to the red-banded aemilia ("A." ambigua) was formerly placed in the genus (though only uneasily so). The species has recently been moved to the revalidated genus Pseudohemihyalea.

== Selected species ==
Species of Aemilia include:

- Aemilia affinis (Rothschild, 1909)
- Aemilia asignata Hampson, 1901
- Aemilia castanea Joicey & Talbot, 1916
- Aemilia crassa (Walker, [1865])
- Aemilia fanum (Druce, 1900)
- Aemilia melanchra Schaus, 1905
- Aemilia mincosa (Druce, 1906)
- Aemilia ockendeni (Rothschild, 1909)
- Aemilia pagana (Schaus, 1894)
- Aemilia peropaca (Seitz, 1920)
- Aemilia rubriplaga (Walker, 1855)
- Aemilia tabaconas (Joicey & Talbot, 1916)
- Aemilia testudo Hampson, 1901
