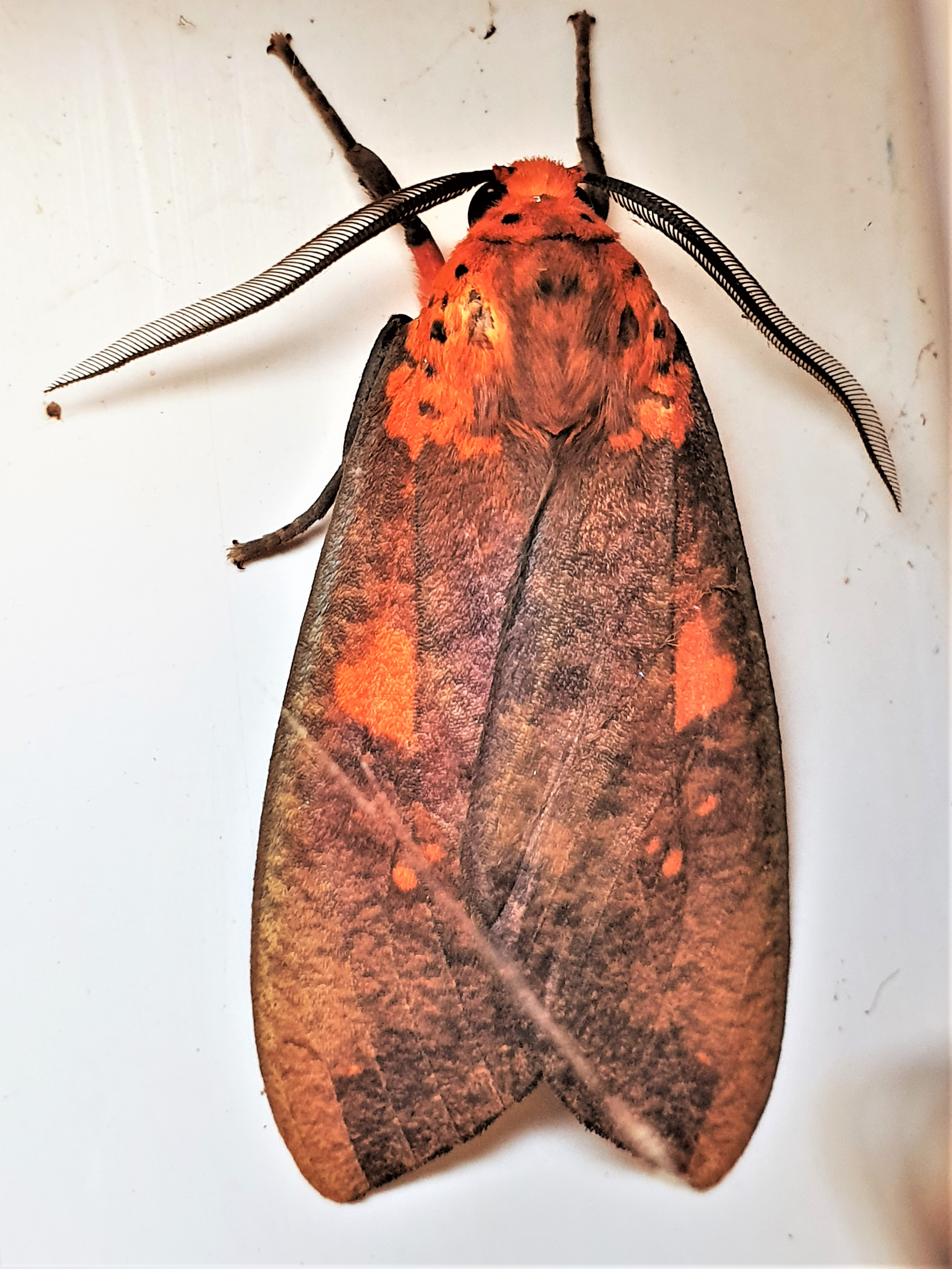
- Ammalo helops

Scientific classification
- Kingdom: Animalia
- Phylum: Arthropoda
- Class: Insecta
- Order: Lepidoptera
- Superfamily: Noctuoidea
- Family: Erebidae
- Subfamily: Arctiinae
- Subtribe: Phaegopterina
- Genus: Ammalo; Walker, 1855

= Ammalo =

Genus of moths

Ammalo is a genus of moths in the subtribe Phaegopterina in the family Erebidae. The genus was erected by Francis Walker in 1855.

== Species ==
- Ammalo ammaloides (Rothschild, 1909) Peru, Brazil (Amazonas)
- Ammalo buritiensis Rego Barros, 1974 Brazil (Mato Grosso)
- Ammalo helops (Cramer, [1775]) Mexico, Guatemala, Costa Rica, Honduras, Panama, Jamaica, Cuba, Hait, Granada, Tridinad, Amazonas, Brazil, Venezuela, Surinam, Peru, Colombia
- Ammalo klagesi Rothschild, 1909 Brazil (Amazonas), French Guiana
- Ammalo pachycera (Seitz, 1922) Bolivia
- Ammalo peruviana Rothschild, 1922 Peru
- Ammalo ramsdeni Schaus, 1924 Cuba
- Ammalo travassosi Rego Barros, 1974 Brazil (Rio de Janeiro)
- Ammalo trujillaria Dognin, 1905 Peru
- Ammalo violitincta Rothschild, 1922 Brazil (Pará)
