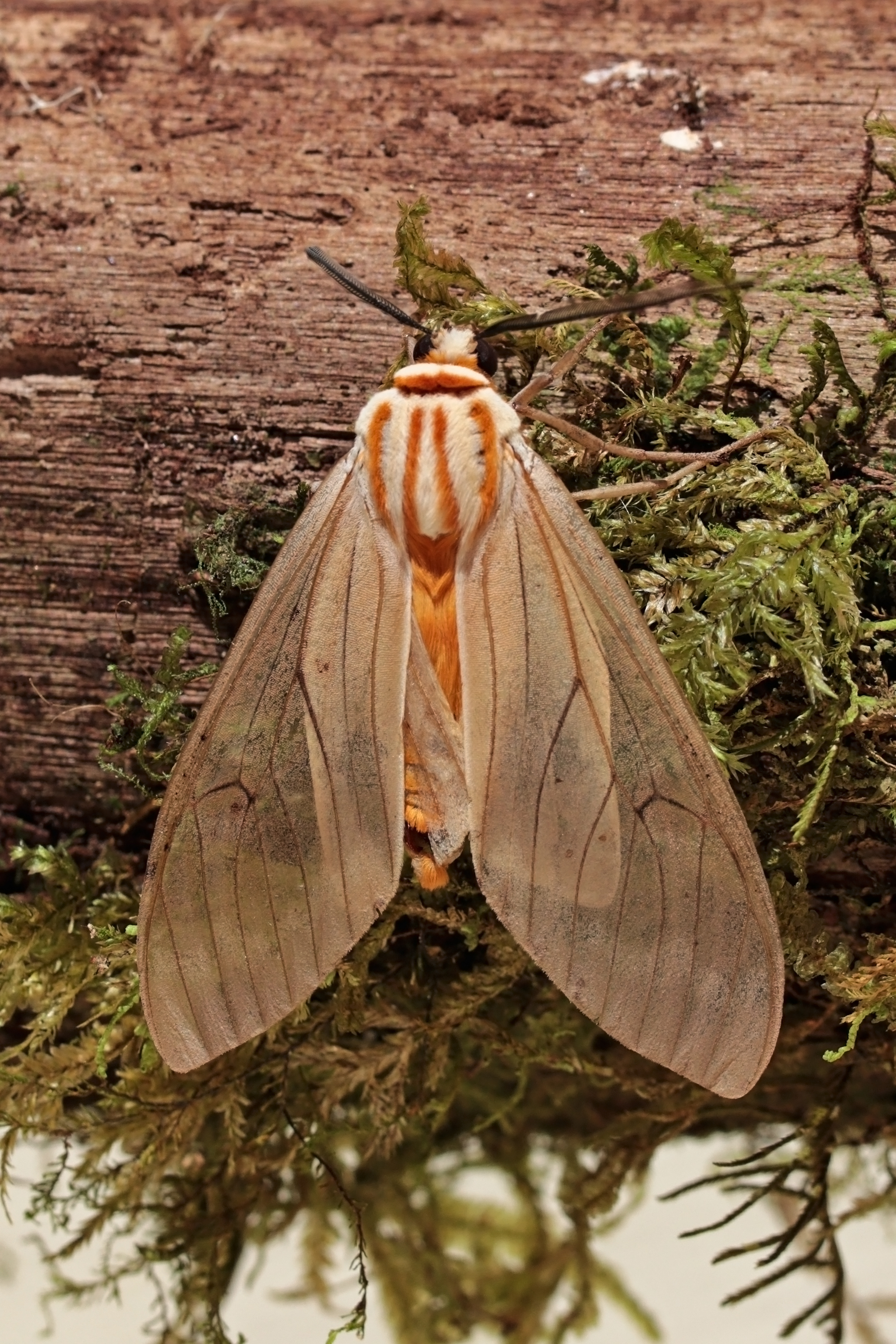
- Amastus aconia rumina Mount Totumas cloud forest, Panama

Scientific classification
- Kingdom: Animalia
- Phylum: Arthropoda
- Class: Insecta
- Order: Lepidoptera
- Superfamily: Noctuoidea
- Family: Erebidae
- Subfamily: Arctiinae
- Subtribe: Phaegopterina
- Genus: Amastus; Walker, 1855

Type species
- Phaegoptera collaris Herrich-Schäffer, [1853]

= Amastus =

Genus of moths

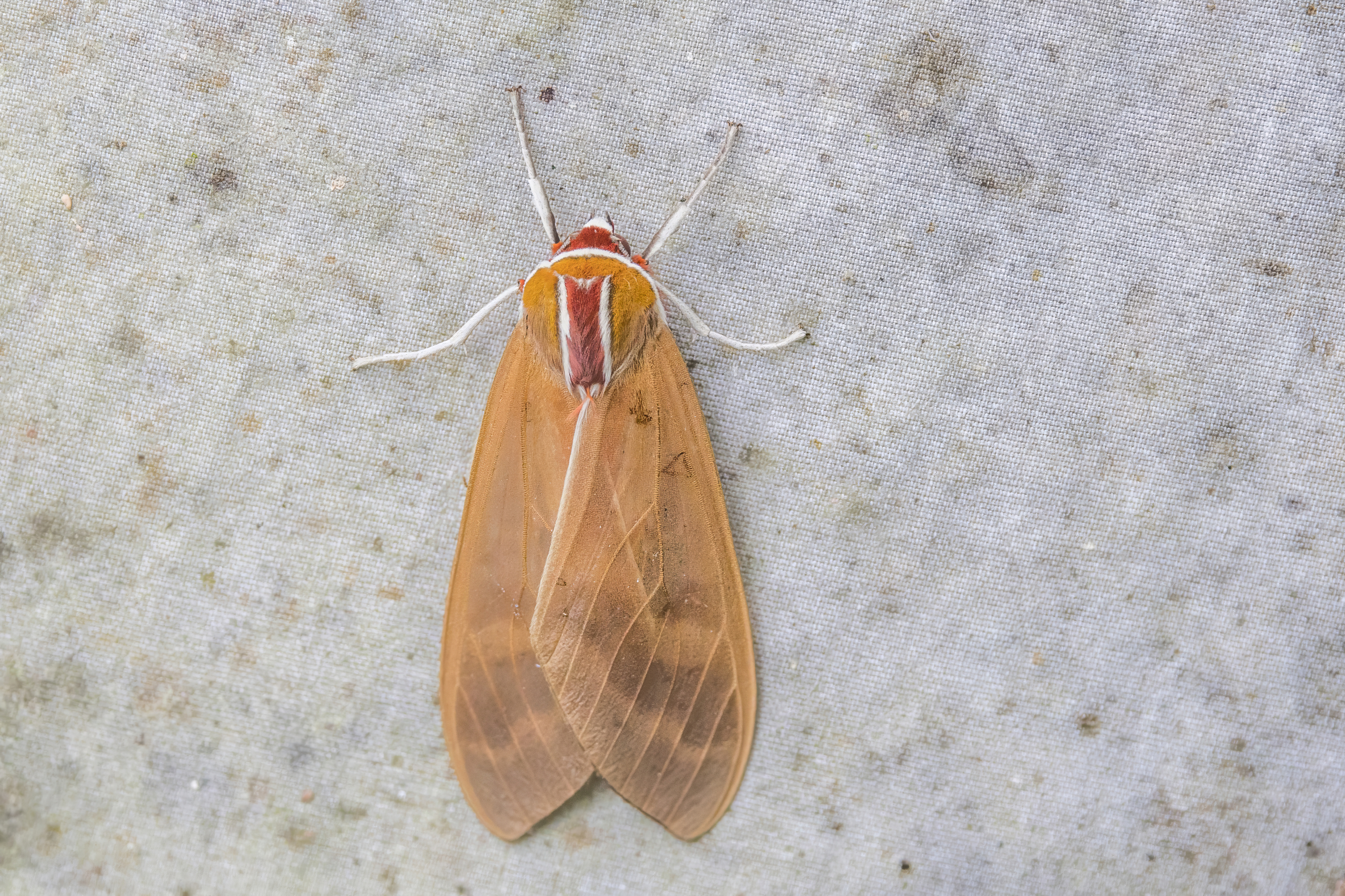
A. coccinator, Ecuador

Amastus is a genus of moths in the family Erebidae. The genus was erected by Francis Walker in 1855.

== Taxonomy ==
The delimitation of Amastus versus Hemihyalea has long been problematic. It was recently determined that the type species of Hemihyalea (the old Phaegoptera cornea) is so closely related to that of Amastus (P. collaris) as to warrant inclusion in the present genus. That determination led to the reestablishment of the genus Pseudohemihyalea for the more distantly related group of species around "Hemihyalea" schausi. There is no consensus yet on whether to include the remaining Hemihyalea species in Amastus.

== Selected species ==
Species of Amastus include:

- Amastis aconia (Herrich-Schäffer 1853)
- Amastus bicolor (Maassen, 1890)
- Amastus cellularis Rothschild, 1922
- Amastus collaris (Herrich-Schäffer, [1853])
- Amastus maasseni (Rothschild, 1909)
- Amastus modesta (Maassen, 1890)
- Amastus mossi (Rothschild, 1922)
- Amastus muscosa (Rothschild, 1909)
- Amastus rubicundus (Toulgoët, 1981)
- Amastus rufocinnamomea (Rothschild, 1909)
- Amastus rufothorax Toulgoët, 1999
- Amastus umber Rothschild, 1909
- Amastus walkeri (Rothschild, 1922)

"A." lehmanni as described by Walter Rothschild in 1910 is now in Opharus. The homonymous species described by Rothschild in 1916, now renamed "A." popayanensis, is one of those disputed between Amastus and Hemihyalea.
