= Pseudohemihyalea asignata =

Scientific classification
- Domain: Eukaryota
- Kingdom: Animalia
- Phylum: Arthropoda
- Class: Insecta
- Order: Lepidoptera
- Superfamily: Noctuoidea
- Family: Erebidae
- Subfamily: Arctiinae
- Genus: Pseudohemihyalea
- Species: P. asignata

Binomial name
- Pseudohemihyalea asignata (Reich, 1938)

Synonyms
- Hemihyalea asignata Reich, 1938

Species of moth

Pseudohemihyalea asignata is a moth in the family Erebidae. It was described by Reich in 1938. It is found in Costa Rica.
