= Pachydota iodea =

Scientific classification
- Domain: Eukaryota
- Kingdom: Animalia
- Phylum: Arthropoda
- Class: Insecta
- Order: Lepidoptera
- Superfamily: Noctuoidea
- Family: Erebidae
- Subfamily: Arctiinae
- Genus: Pachydota
- Species: P. iodea

Binomial name
- Pachydota iodea (Herrich-Schäffer, 1855)

Synonyms
- Phegoptera iodea Herrich-Schäffer, 1855; Pseudapistosia saduca Druce, 1897

Species of moth

Pachydota iodea is a moth of the family Erebidae. It was described by Gottlieb August Wilhelm Herrich-Schäffer in 1855. It is found on Jamaica and in Mexico and Guyana.
