= Aemilia fanum =

Scientific classification
- Domain: Eukaryota
- Kingdom: Animalia
- Phylum: Arthropoda
- Class: Insecta
- Order: Lepidoptera
- Superfamily: Noctuoidea
- Family: Erebidae
- Subfamily: Arctiinae
- Genus: Aemilia
- Species: A. fanum

Binomial name
- Aemilia fanum (H. Druce, 1900)

Synonyms
- Eucereon fanum; Correbidia fana

Species of moth

Aemilia fanum is a moth of the family Erebidae. It was described by Herbert Druce in 1900. It is found in Venezuela.
