= Pseudohemihyalea debilis =

Scientific classification
- Domain: Eukaryota
- Kingdom: Animalia
- Phylum: Arthropoda
- Class: Insecta
- Order: Lepidoptera
- Superfamily: Noctuoidea
- Family: Erebidae
- Subfamily: Arctiinae
- Genus: Pseudohemihyalea
- Species: P. debilis

Binomial name
- Pseudohemihyalea debilis (Rothschild, 1916)

Synonyms
- Amastus debilis Rothschild, 1916; Hemihyalea debilis

Species of moth

Pseudohemihyalea debilis is a moth in the family Erebidae. It was described by Walter Rothschild in 1916. It is found in Venezuela.
