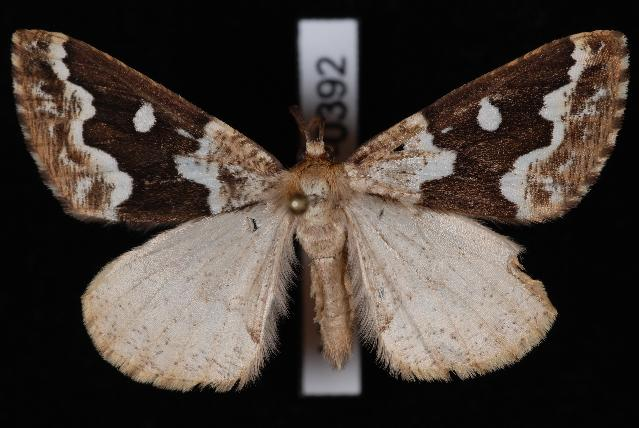

Scientific classification
- Kingdom: Animalia
- Phylum: Arthropoda
- Clade: Pancrustacea
- Class: Insecta
- Order: Lepidoptera
- Family: Geometridae
- Tribe: Ourapterygini
- Genus: Caripeta
- Species: C. divisata

Binomial name
- Caripeta divisata Walker, 1863

Synonyms
- Caripeta divisata nigraria Forbes, 1924; Cidaria albopunctata Morrison, 1874

= Caripeta divisata =

Species of moth

Caripeta divisata, commonly known as the gray spruce looper or twin-spot girdle, is a species of geometrid moth in the family Geometridae. It is found in North America.

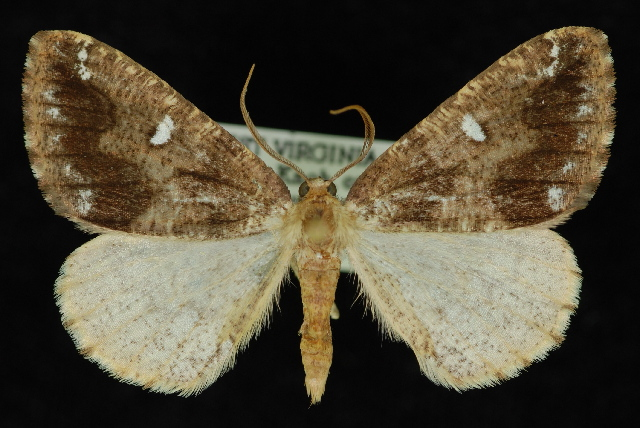
Gray spruce looper, Caripeta divisata
