= Pachydota rosenbergi =

Scientific classification
- Domain: Eukaryota
- Kingdom: Animalia
- Phylum: Arthropoda
- Class: Insecta
- Order: Lepidoptera
- Superfamily: Noctuoidea
- Family: Erebidae
- Subfamily: Arctiinae
- Genus: Pachydota
- Species: P. rosenbergi

Binomial name
- Pachydota rosenbergi Rothschild, 1909

Synonyms
- Pachydota nitens Schaus, 1910; Pachydota roseitincta Schaus, 1910

Species of moth

Pachydota rosenbergi is a moth of the family Erebidae. It was described by Walter Rothschild in 1909. It is found in Ecuador and Costa Rica.
