= Aemilia melanchra =

Scientific classification
- Kingdom: Animalia
- Phylum: Arthropoda
- Clade: Pancrustacea
- Class: Insecta
- Order: Lepidoptera
- Superfamily: Noctuoidea
- Family: Erebidae
- Subfamily: Arctiinae
- Genus: Aemilia
- Species: A. melanchra

Binomial name
- Aemilia melanchra Schaus, 1905

Synonyms
- Aemilia brunneipars Hampson, 1909

Species of moth

Aemilia melanchra is a moth of the family Erebidae. The moth was described by William Schaus in 1905, and is found in Peru.
