= Amastus mossi =

Scientific classification
- Domain: Eukaryota
- Kingdom: Animalia
- Phylum: Arthropoda
- Class: Insecta
- Order: Lepidoptera
- Superfamily: Noctuoidea
- Family: Erebidae
- Subfamily: Arctiinae
- Genus: Amastus
- Species: A. mossi

Binomial name
- Amastus mossi (Rothschild, 1922)

Synonyms
- Elysius mossi Rothschild, 1922

Species of moth

Amastus mossi is a moth of the family Erebidae. It was described by Walter Rothschild in 1922. It is found in Peru and Ecuador.
