= Aemilia pagana =

Scientific classification
- Domain: Eukaryota
- Kingdom: Animalia
- Phylum: Arthropoda
- Class: Insecta
- Order: Lepidoptera
- Superfamily: Noctuoidea
- Family: Erebidae
- Subfamily: Arctiinae
- Genus: Aemilia
- Species: A. pagana

Binomial name
- Aemilia pagana (Schaus, 1894)

Synonyms
- Halysidota pagana Schaus, 1894

Species of moth

Aemilia pagana is a moth of the family Erebidae. It was described by Schaus in 1894. It is found in Brazil.
