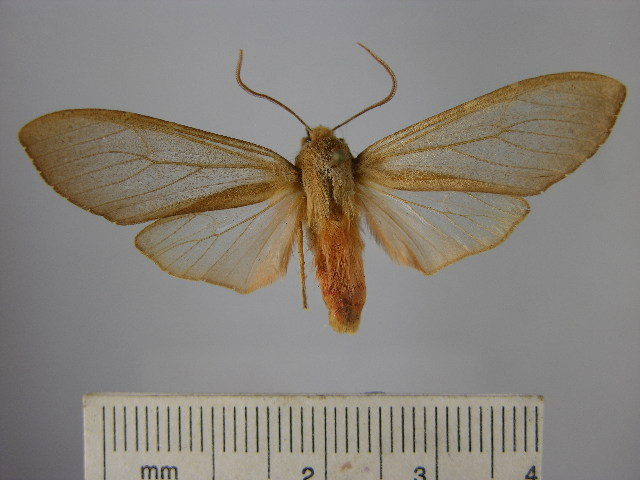

Scientific classification
- Domain: Eukaryota
- Kingdom: Animalia
- Phylum: Arthropoda
- Class: Insecta
- Order: Lepidoptera
- Superfamily: Noctuoidea
- Family: Erebidae
- Subfamily: Arctiinae
- Genus: Pseudohemihyalea
- Species: P. rhoda

Binomial name
- Pseudohemihyalea rhoda (H. Druce, 1894)

Synonyms
- Phaegoptera rhoda H. Druce, 1894; Hemihyalea rhoda; Hemihyalea fuscescens Rothschild, 1909; Hemihyalea hidalgonis Dyar, 1916

= Pseudohemihyalea rhoda =

Species of moth

Pseudohemihyalea rhoda is a moth in the family Erebidae. It was described by Herbert Druce in 1894. It is found in Guatemala.
