= Pseudohemihyalea testacea =

Scientific classification
- Domain: Eukaryota
- Kingdom: Animalia
- Phylum: Arthropoda
- Class: Insecta
- Order: Lepidoptera
- Superfamily: Noctuoidea
- Family: Erebidae
- Subfamily: Arctiinae
- Genus: Pseudohemihyalea
- Species: P. testacea

Binomial name
- Pseudohemihyalea testacea (Rothschild, 1909)

Synonyms
- Hemihyalea testacea Rothschild, 1909

Species of moth

Pseudohemihyalea testacea is a moth in the family Erebidae. It was described by Walter Rothschild in 1909. It is found in Mexico.
