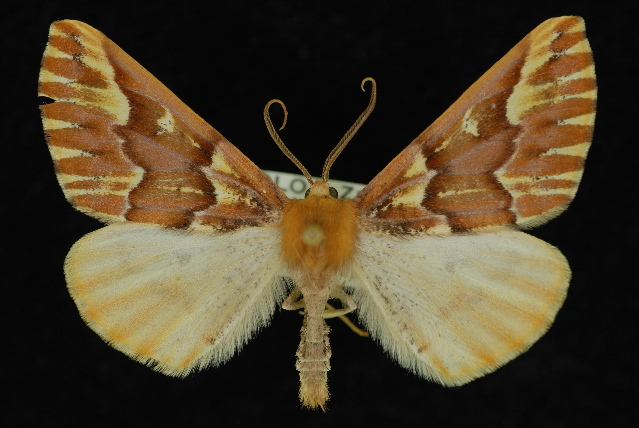

Scientific classification
- Domain: Eukaryota
- Kingdom: Animalia
- Phylum: Arthropoda
- Class: Insecta
- Order: Lepidoptera
- Family: Geometridae
- Tribe: Ourapterygini
- Genus: Caripeta
- Species: C. aequaliaria

Binomial name
- Caripeta aequaliaria Grote, 1883

= Caripeta aequaliaria =

Species of moth

Caripeta aequaliaria, known generally as the red girdle or western conifer looper, is a species of geometrid moth in the family Geometridae. It is found in North America.

The MONA or Hodges number for Caripeta aequaliaria is 6865.
