= Caripeta interalbicans =

Scientific classification
- Domain: Eukaryota
- Kingdom: Animalia
- Phylum: Arthropoda
- Class: Insecta
- Order: Lepidoptera
- Family: Geometridae
- Tribe: Ourapterygini
- Genus: Caripeta
- Species: C. interalbicans

Binomial name
- Caripeta interalbicans Warren, 1904

Species of moth

Caripeta interalbicans is a species of geometrid moth in the family Geometridae. It is found in North America.

The MONA or Hodges number for Caripeta interalbicans is 6866.
