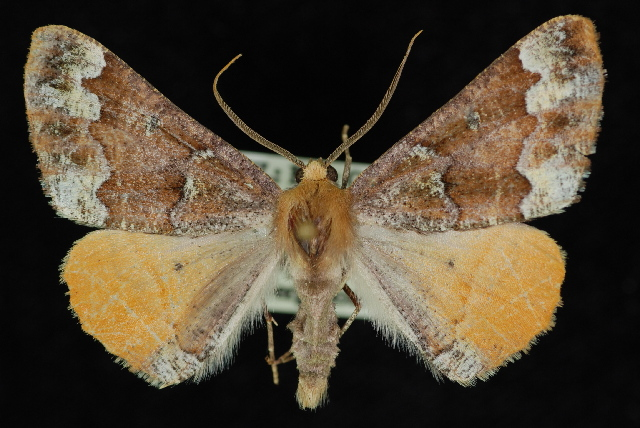

Scientific classification
- Domain: Eukaryota
- Kingdom: Animalia
- Phylum: Arthropoda
- Class: Insecta
- Order: Lepidoptera
- Family: Geometridae
- Tribe: Ourapterygini
- Genus: Caripeta
- Species: C. pulcherrima

Binomial name
- Caripeta pulcherrima (Guedet, 1941)

Synonyms
- Azelina waltonaria Sperry, 1984; Lygris pulcherrima Guedet, 1941

= Caripeta pulcherrima =

Species of moth

Caripeta pulcherrima is a species of geometrid moth in the family Geometridae. It is found in North America.

The MONA or Hodges number for Caripeta pulcherrima is 6870.
