= Amastus collaris =

Scientific classification
- Domain: Eukaryota
- Kingdom: Animalia
- Phylum: Arthropoda
- Class: Insecta
- Order: Lepidoptera
- Superfamily: Noctuoidea
- Family: Erebidae
- Subfamily: Arctiinae
- Genus: Amastus
- Species: A. collaris

Binomial name
- Amastus collaris (Herrich-Schäffer, [1853])

Synonyms
- Phaegoptera collaris Herrich-Schäffer, [1853]; Amastus inconspicuus Strand, 1919

Species of moth

Amastus collaris is a moth of the family Erebidae. It was described by Gottlieb August Wilhelm Herrich-Schäffer in 1853. It is found in Venezuela, Peru, Colombia and Ecuador.

== Subspecies ==
- Amastus collaris collaris (Venezuela)
- Amastus collaris inconspicuus Strand, 1919 (Colombia)
