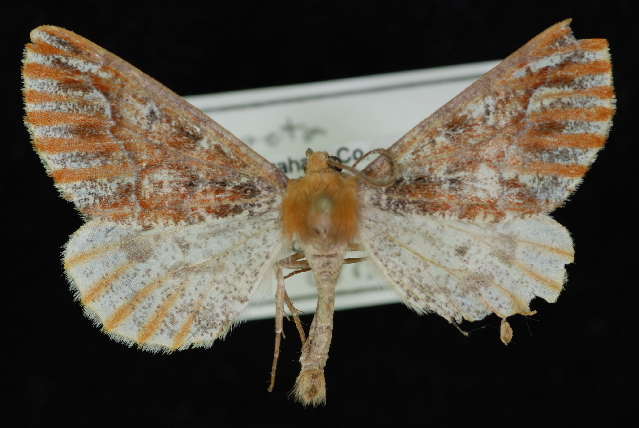

Scientific classification
- Domain: Eukaryota
- Kingdom: Animalia
- Phylum: Arthropoda
- Class: Insecta
- Order: Lepidoptera
- Family: Geometridae
- Tribe: Ourapterygini
- Genus: Caripeta
- Species: C. suffusata

Binomial name
- Caripeta suffusata Guedet, 1939

= Caripeta suffusata =

Species of moth

Caripeta suffusata is a species of geometrid moth in the family Geometridae. It is found in North America.

The MONA or Hodges number for Caripeta suffusata is 6865.1.
