= Pachydota =

Scientific classification
- Kingdom: Animalia
- Phylum: Arthropoda
- Class: Insecta
- Order: Lepidoptera
- Superfamily: Noctuoidea
- Family: Erebidae
- Subfamily: Arctiinae
- Tribe: Arctiini
- Subtribe: Phaegopterina
- Genus: Pachydota; Hampson, 1901

Genus of moths

Pachydota is a genus of moths in the family Erebidae. The genus was erected by George Hampson in 1901.

== Species ==
- Pachydota affinis Rothschild, 1909
- Pachydota albiceps Walker, 1856
- Pachydota drucei Rothschild, 1909
- Pachydota ducasa Schaus, 1905
- Pachydota iodea Herrich-Schäffer, 1855
- Pachydota nervosa Felder, 1874
- Pachydota peruviana Rothschild, 1909
- Pachydota punctata Rothschild, 1909
- Pachydota rosenbergi Rothschild, 1909
- Pachydota saduca Druce, 1895
- Pachydota striata Dognin, 1893
