= Ammalo ramsdeni =

Scientific classification
- Kingdom: Animalia
- Phylum: Arthropoda
- Class: Insecta
- Order: Lepidoptera
- Superfamily: Noctuoidea
- Family: Erebidae
- Subfamily: Arctiinae
- Genus: Ammalo
- Species: A. ramsdeni

Binomial name
- Ammalo ramsdeni Schaus, 1924

Species of moth

Ammalo ramsdeni is a moth of the family Erebidae first described by William Schaus in 1924. It is found on Cuba.
