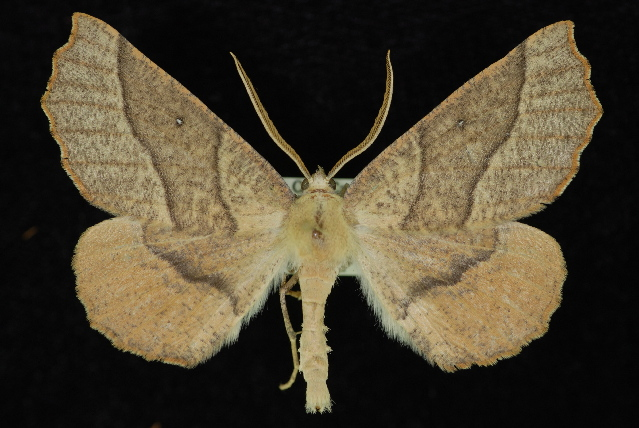

Scientific classification
- Domain: Eukaryota
- Kingdom: Animalia
- Phylum: Arthropoda
- Class: Insecta
- Order: Lepidoptera
- Family: Geometridae
- Genus: Caripeta
- Species: C. ocellaria

Binomial name
- Caripeta ocellaria (Grossbeck, 1907)

Synonyms
- Gonodontis ocellaria Grossbeck, 1907

= Caripeta ocellaria =

Species of moth

Caripeta ocellaria is a species of geometrid moth in the family Geometridae. It is found in North America.

The MONA or Hodges number for Caripeta ocellaria is 6873.
