= Pseudohemihyalea inexpectata =

Scientific classification
- Kingdom: Animalia
- Phylum: Arthropoda
- Class: Insecta
- Order: Lepidoptera
- Superfamily: Noctuoidea
- Family: Erebidae
- Subfamily: Arctiinae
- Genus: Pseudohemihyalea
- Species: P. inexpectata

Binomial name
- Pseudohemihyalea inexpectata Toulgoët, 1999

Species of moth

Pseudohemihyalea inexpectata is a moth in the family Erebidae. It was described by Hervé de Toulgoët in 1999. It is found in Sonora, Mexico.
