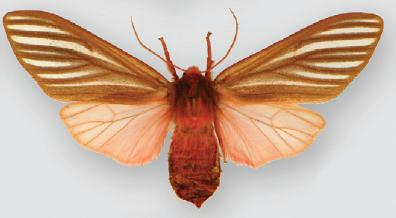
- Pseudohemihyalea sonorosa (female)
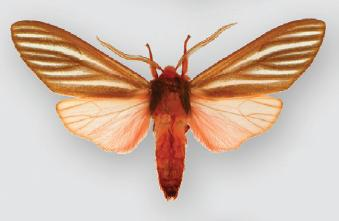
- Pseudohemihyalea sonorosa (male)

Scientific classification
- Domain: Eukaryota
- Kingdom: Animalia
- Phylum: Arthropoda
- Class: Insecta
- Order: Lepidoptera
- Superfamily: Noctuoidea
- Family: Erebidae
- Subfamily: Arctiinae
- Genus: Pseudohemihyalea
- Species: P. sonorosa

Binomial name
- Pseudohemihyalea sonorosa Schmidt, 2009

= Pseudohemihyalea sonorosa =

Species of moth

Pseudohemihyalea sonorosa is a moth of the family Erebidae. It is found in Sonora, Mexico in the upper elevation pine-oak forests of the Sierra Madre Occidental.

The length of the forewings is about 26 mm for males and 31 mm for females. Adults are on wing in September.

The larvae probably feed on Pinus species.
