= Amastus rufothorax =

Scientific classification
- Kingdom: Animalia
- Phylum: Arthropoda
- Class: Insecta
- Order: Lepidoptera
- Superfamily: Noctuoidea
- Family: Erebidae
- Subfamily: Arctiinae
- Genus: Amastus
- Species: A. rufothorax

Binomial name
- Amastus rufothorax Toulgoët, 1999

Species of moth

Amastus rufothorax is a moth of the family Erebidae. It was described by Hervé de Toulgoët in 1999. It is found in Peru.
