= Pseudohemihyalea utica =

Scientific classification
- Domain: Eukaryota
- Kingdom: Animalia
- Phylum: Arthropoda
- Class: Insecta
- Order: Lepidoptera
- Superfamily: Noctuoidea
- Family: Erebidae
- Subfamily: Arctiinae
- Genus: Pseudohemihyalea
- Species: P. utica

Binomial name
- Pseudohemihyalea utica (H. Druce, 1897)

Synonyms
- Carales utica H. Druce, 1897; Hemihyalea utica

Species of moth

Pseudohemihyalea utica is a moth in the family Erebidae. It was described by Herbert Druce in 1897. It is found in Mexico.
