= Pachydota peruviana =

Scientific classification
- Domain: Eukaryota
- Kingdom: Animalia
- Phylum: Arthropoda
- Class: Insecta
- Order: Lepidoptera
- Superfamily: Noctuoidea
- Family: Erebidae
- Subfamily: Arctiinae
- Genus: Pachydota
- Species: P. peruviana

Binomial name
- Pachydota peruviana Rothschild, 1909

Species of moth

Pachydota peruviana is a moth of the family Erebidae. It was described by Walter Rothschild in 1909. It is found in Peru and Colombia.

== Subspecies ==
- Pachydota peruviana peruviana (Peru)
- Pachydota peruviana palmeri Rothschild, 1910 (Colombia)
