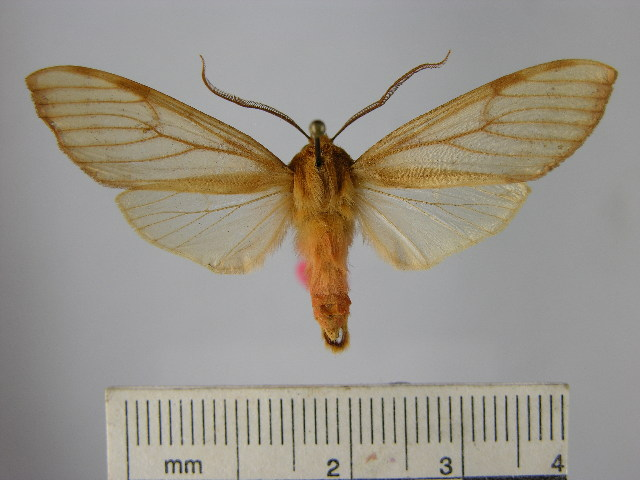

Scientific classification
- Domain: Eukaryota
- Kingdom: Animalia
- Phylum: Arthropoda
- Class: Insecta
- Order: Lepidoptera
- Superfamily: Noctuoidea
- Family: Erebidae
- Subfamily: Arctiinae
- Genus: Pseudohemihyalea
- Species: P. anapheoides

Binomial name
- Pseudohemihyalea anapheoides (Rothschild, 1909)

Synonyms
- Halysidota anapheoides Rothschild, 1909

= Pseudohemihyalea anapheoides =

Species of moth

Pseudohemihyalea anapheoides is a moth in the family Erebidae first described by Walter Rothschild in 1909. It is found in Panama.
