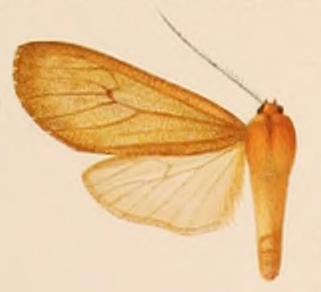

Scientific classification
- Domain: Eukaryota
- Kingdom: Animalia
- Phylum: Arthropoda
- Class: Insecta
- Order: Lepidoptera
- Superfamily: Noctuoidea
- Family: Erebidae
- Subfamily: Arctiinae
- Genus: Amastus
- Species: A. rufocinnamomea

Binomial name
- Amastus rufocinnamomea (Rothschild, 1909)

Synonyms
- Halysidota rufocinnamomea Rothschild, 1909

= Amastus rufocinnamomea =

Species of moth

Amastus rufocinnamomea is a moth of the family Erebidae first described by Walter Rothschild in 1909. It is found in Peru.
