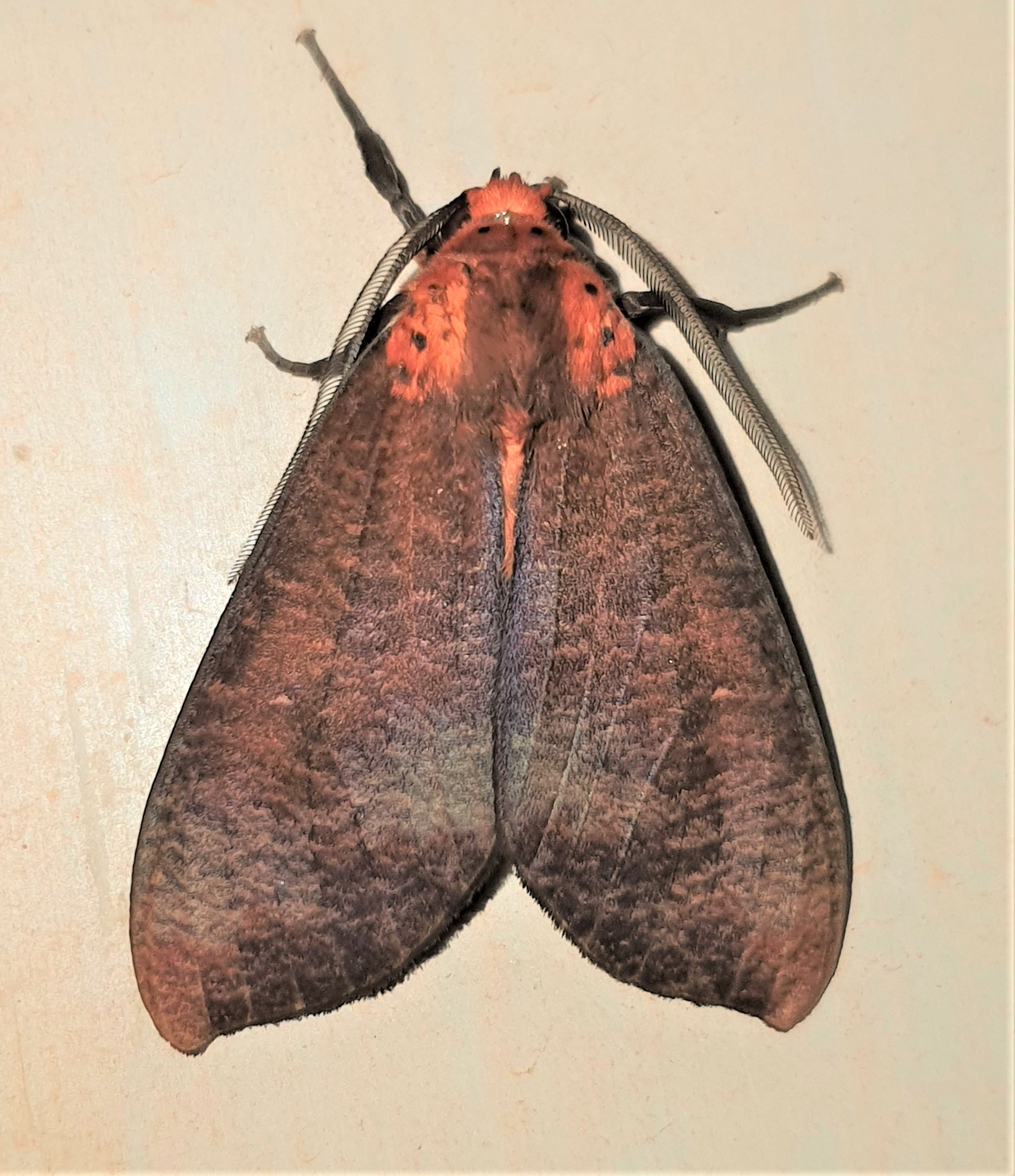
- Adult

Scientific classification
- Domain: Eukaryota
- Kingdom: Animalia
- Phylum: Arthropoda
- Class: Insecta
- Order: Lepidoptera
- Superfamily: Noctuoidea
- Family: Erebidae
- Subfamily: Arctiinae
- Genus: Ammalo
- Species: A. ammaloides

Binomial name
- Ammalo ammaloides (Rothschild, 1909)

Synonyms
- Elysius ammaloides Rothschild, 1909

= Ammalo ammaloides =

Species of moth

Ammalo ammaloides is a moth of the family Erebidae first described by Walter Rothschild in 1909. It is found in Peru and Suriname.
