= Aemilia testudo =

Scientific classification
- Kingdom: Animalia
- Phylum: Arthropoda
- Class: Insecta
- Order: Lepidoptera
- Superfamily: Noctuoidea
- Family: Erebidae
- Subfamily: Arctiinae
- Genus: Aemilia
- Species: A. testudo

Binomial name
- Aemilia testudo Hampson, 1901

Species of moth

Aemilia testudo is a moth of the family Erebidae. It was described by George Hampson in 1901. It is found in Peru.
