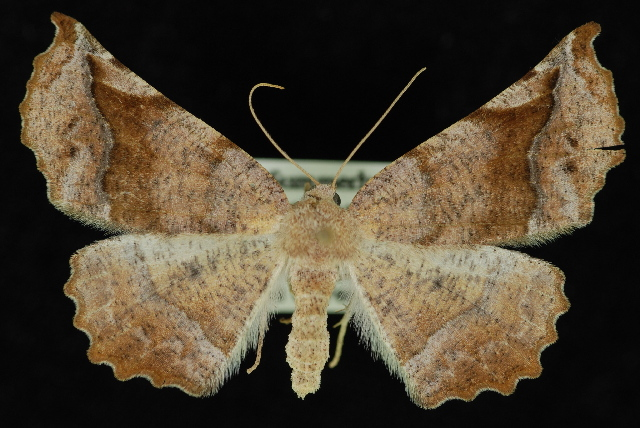

Scientific classification
- Kingdom: Animalia
- Phylum: Arthropoda
- Class: Insecta
- Order: Lepidoptera
- Family: Geometridae
- Genus: Caripeta
- Species: C. hilumaria

Binomial name
- Caripeta hilumaria Hulst, 1886

= Caripeta hilumaria =

Species of moth

Caripeta hilumaria is a species of geometrid moth in the family Geometridae.

The MONA or Hodges number for Caripeta hilumaria is 6871.
