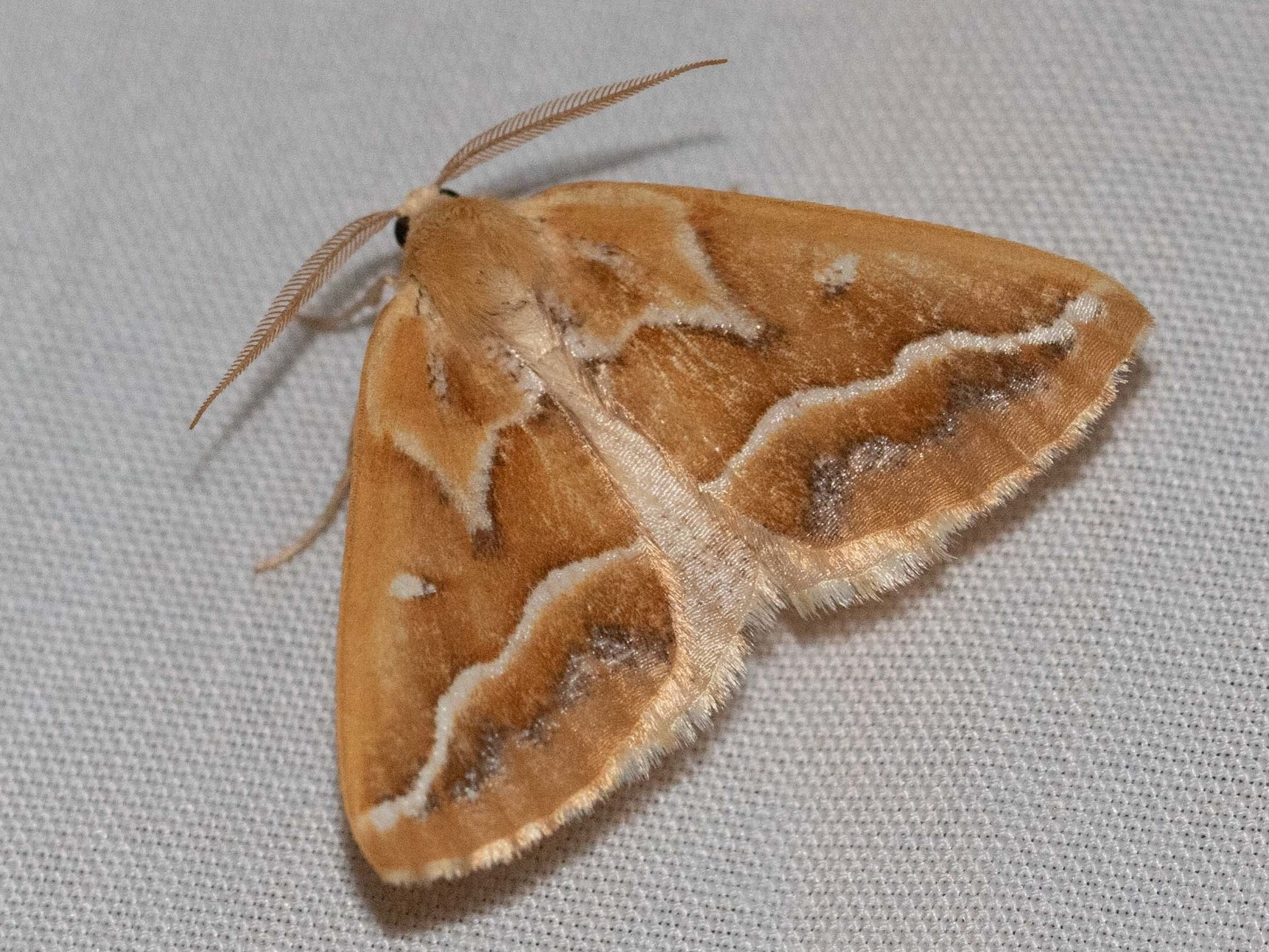

Scientific classification
- Kingdom: Animalia
- Phylum: Arthropoda
- Class: Insecta
- Order: Lepidoptera
- Family: Geometridae
- Tribe: Ourapterygini
- Genus: Caripeta
- Species: C. angustiorata

Binomial name
- Caripeta angustiorata Walker, 1863

Synonyms
- Caripeta criminosa Swett, 1906

= Caripeta angustiorata =

Species of moth

Caripeta angustiorata, known generally as the brown pine looper or oblique girdle, is a species of geometrid moth in the family Geometridae. It is found in North America.
