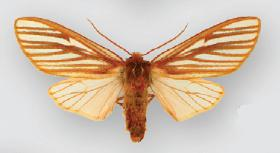
- Female
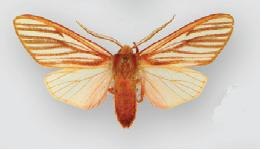
- Male

Scientific classification
- Kingdom: Animalia
- Phylum: Arthropoda
- Class: Insecta
- Order: Lepidoptera
- Superfamily: Noctuoidea
- Family: Erebidae
- Subfamily: Arctiinae
- Genus: Pseudohemihyalea
- Species: P. fallaciosa

Binomial name
- Pseudohemihyalea fallaciosa Toulgoët, 1997

Synonyms
- Aemilia fallaciosa

= Pseudohemihyalea fallaciosa =

Species of moth

Pseudohemihyalea fallaciosa is a moth of the family Erebidae first described by Hervé de Toulgoët in 1997. It is found from Chiapas, Mexico south to Guatemala and Honduras at elevations of 1,400 to 1,900 meters.

The length of the forewings is about 18.4 mm for males. Adults are on wing from May to September.

The larvae probably feed on Pinus species.
