= Amastus walkeri =

Scientific classification
- Domain: Eukaryota
- Kingdom: Animalia
- Phylum: Arthropoda
- Class: Insecta
- Order: Lepidoptera
- Superfamily: Noctuoidea
- Family: Erebidae
- Subfamily: Arctiinae
- Genus: Amastus
- Species: A. walkeri

Binomial name
- Amastus walkeri (Rothschild, 1922)

Synonyms
- Elysius walkeri Rothschild, 1922; Magnoptera watsoni Ruiz, 1989

Species of moth

Amastus walkeri is a moth of the family Erebidae. It was described by Walter Rothschild in 1922. It is found in Peru.
