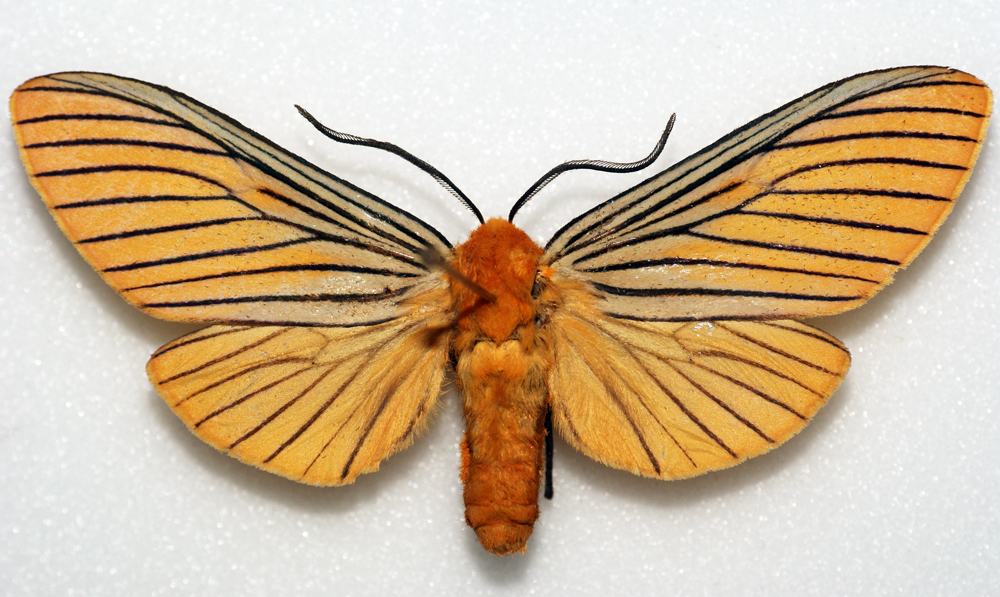

Scientific classification
- Domain: Eukaryota
- Kingdom: Animalia
- Phylum: Arthropoda
- Class: Insecta
- Order: Lepidoptera
- Superfamily: Noctuoidea
- Family: Erebidae
- Subfamily: Arctiinae
- Genus: Pachydota
- Species: P. nervosa

Binomial name
- Pachydota nervosa (Felder, 1874)

Synonyms
- Lophocampa nervosa Felder, 1874

= Pachydota nervosa =

Species of moth

Pachydota nervosa is a moth of the subfamily Arctiinae. It was described by Felder in 1874. It is found in Colombia, Venezuela, Ecuador and Peru.
