= Pachydota saduca =

Scientific classification
- Domain: Eukaryota
- Kingdom: Animalia
- Phylum: Arthropoda
- Class: Insecta
- Order: Lepidoptera
- Superfamily: Noctuoidea
- Family: Erebidae
- Subfamily: Arctiinae
- Genus: Pachydota
- Species: P. saduca

Binomial name
- Pachydota saduca (H. Druce, 1895)

Synonyms
- Pseudapistosia saduca H. Druce, 1895

Species of moth

Pachydota saduca is a moth of the family Erebidae. It was described by Herbert Druce in 1895. It is found in Costa Rica, Colombia and Bolivia.
