= Ammalo violitincta =

Scientific classification
- Domain: Eukaryota
- Kingdom: Animalia
- Phylum: Arthropoda
- Class: Insecta
- Order: Lepidoptera
- Superfamily: Noctuoidea
- Family: Erebidae
- Subfamily: Arctiinae
- Genus: Ammalo
- Species: A. violitincta

Binomial name
- Ammalo violitincta Rothschild, 1922

Species of moth

Ammalo violitincta is a moth of the family Erebidae first described by Walter Rothschild in 1922. It is found in Brazil.
