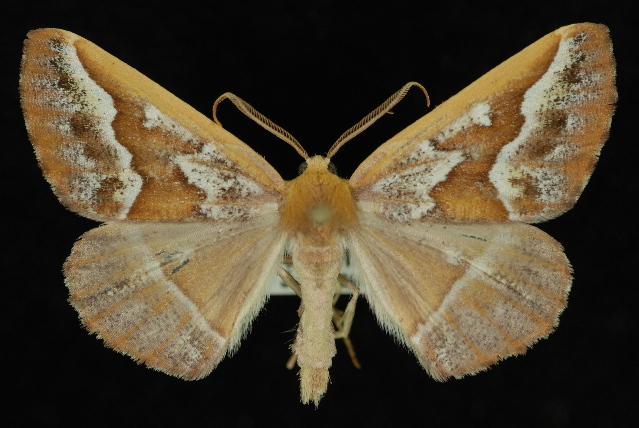

Scientific classification
- Kingdom: Animalia
- Phylum: Arthropoda
- Class: Insecta
- Order: Lepidoptera
- Family: Geometridae
- Tribe: Ourapterygini
- Genus: Caripeta
- Species: C. aretaria

Binomial name
- Caripeta aretaria (Walker, 1860)

Synonyms
- Azelina aretaria Walker, 1860; Caripeta subochrearia Grote, 1883

= Caripeta aretaria =

Species of moth

Caripeta aretaria, the southern pine looper, is a species of geometrid moth in the family Geometridae. It is found in North America.

The MONA or Hodges number for Caripeta aretaria is 6869.
