= Ammalo trujillaria =

Scientific classification
- Domain: Eukaryota
- Kingdom: Animalia
- Phylum: Arthropoda
- Class: Insecta
- Order: Lepidoptera
- Superfamily: Noctuoidea
- Family: Erebidae
- Subfamily: Arctiinae
- Genus: Ammalo
- Species: A. trujillaria

Binomial name
- Ammalo trujillaria Dognin, 1905

Species of moth

Ammalo trujillaria is a moth of the family Erebidae first described by Paul Dognin in 1905. It is found in Peru.
