= Pachydota ducasa =

Scientific classification
- Domain: Eukaryota
- Kingdom: Animalia
- Phylum: Arthropoda
- Class: Insecta
- Order: Lepidoptera
- Superfamily: Noctuoidea
- Family: Erebidae
- Subfamily: Arctiinae
- Genus: Pachydota
- Species: P. ducasa

Binomial name
- Pachydota ducasa Schaus, 1905

Species of moth

Pachydota ducasa is a moth of the family Erebidae. It was described by William Schaus in 1905. It is found in Venezuela.
