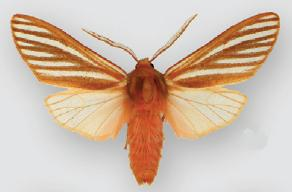
- Adult male red-banded aemilia (P. ambigua)

Scientific classification
- Kingdom: Animalia
- Phylum: Arthropoda
- Clade: Pancrustacea
- Class: Insecta
- Order: Lepidoptera
- Superfamily: Noctuoidea
- Family: Erebidae
- Subfamily: Arctiinae
- Subtribe: Phaegopterina
- Genus: Pseudohemihyalea; Régo Barros, 1956

Type species
- Hemihyalea schausi (see text) Rothschild, 1909

Diversity
- Some 20–30 species

= Pseudohemihyalea =

Genus of moths

Pseudohemihyalea is a genus of moths in the family Erebidae described by Régo Barros in 1956. While the caterpillars of most species of Pseudohemihyalea feed on broad-leaved trees (e.g. oaks, Quercus), the P. ambigua group has larvae that feed on conifers. Their forewing coloration has accordingly evolved to light-and-dark lengthwise striping, giving better camouflage among the slim needles of the host plants. In this, they seem to be convergent to certain geometer moths, such as Caripeta piniata or Sabulodes niveostriata.

== Taxonomy ==
The genus was long included in Hemihyalea when the latter was still unresolved versus Amastus, but seems to be distinct and in fact contain more species than originally believed. The initial confusion stems partly from the fact that Régo Barros when describing the genus set the type species to be Phaegoptera rhoda, but he had actually misidentified Pseudohemihyalea schausi specimens as P. rhoda.

The additional species were usually considered a group of the genus Aemilia, but this was long realized to be awkward and possibly wrong. Since then, a variety of data has been found to suggest the red-banded aemilia ("Aemilia" ambigua) and its closest relatives correctly belong in Pseudohemihyalea. However, the genus is still in need of definite revision, as at least one species is incorrectly placed here.

== Selected species ==
Species of Pseudohemihyalea include:

- Pseudohemihyalea ambigua (Strecker, 1878) – red-banded aemilia
- Pseudohemihyalea anaisabelsanabriae Espinoza, 2026
- Pseudohemihyalea anapheoides (Rothschild, 1909)
- Pseudohemihyalea annario (Dyar, 1914)
- Pseudohemihyalea bosullivani Espinoza, 2026
- Pseudohemihyalea carmen (Schaus, 1920)
- Pseudohemihyalea carteronae (Toulgoët, 1982)
- Pseudohemihyalea carteronae (Toulgoët, 1982)
- Pseudohemihyalea celsicola (Toulgoët, 1982)
- Pseudohemihyalea daraba (Druce, 1894)
- Pseudohemihyalea debilis (Rothschild, 1916)
- Pseudohemihyalea despaignei (Toulgoët, 1982)
- Pseudohemihyalea donharveyi Espinoza, 2026
- Pseudohemihyalea edwardsii (Packard, 1864) – Edwards' glassy-wing
- Pseudohemihyalea eugeniephillipsae Espinoza, 2026
- Pseudohemihyalea euornithia (Dyar, 1914)
- Pseudohemihyalea fallaciosa (Toulgoët, 1997)
- Pseudohemihyalea fuscenscens (Rothschild, 1909)
- Pseudohemihyalea hampsoni (Joicey & Talbot, 1916)
- Pseudohemihyalea inexpectata (Toulgoët, 1999)
- Pseudohemihyalea johnbrowni Espinoza, 2026
- Pseudohemihyalea klagesi (Rothschild, 1909)
- Pseudohemihyalea labecula (Grote, 1881) – freckled glassy-wing
- Pseudohemihyalea labeculoides (Toulgoët, 1995)
- Pseudohemihyalea ludwigi (Beutelspacher, 1984)
- Pseudohemihyalea mansueta (H. Edwards, 1884)
- Pseudohemihyalea marcepsteini Espinoza, 2026
- Pseudohemihyalea melas (Dognin, 1902)
- Pseudohemihyalea montywoodi Espinoza, 2026
- Pseudohemihyalea nimbipicta (Dyar, 1914)
- Pseudohemihyalea ochracea (Rothschild, 1909)
- Pseudohemihyalea porioni (Toulgoët, 1995)
- Pseudohemihyalea potosi (Schmidt, 2009)
- Pseudohemihyalea rexhamiltoni Espinoza, 2026
- Pseudohemihyalea rhoda (Druce, 1894)
- Pseudohemihyalea schausi (Rothschild, 1935)
- Pseudohemihyalea sonorosa (Schmidt, 2009)
- Pseudohemihyalea splendens (Barnes & McDunnough, 1910)
- Pseudohemihyalea syracosia (Druce, 1889)
- Pseudohemihyalea testacea (Rothschild, 1909)
- Pseudohemihyalea toulgoëti Espinoza, 2026
- Pseudohemihyalea utica (Druce, 1897)
