= Aemilia tabaconas =

Scientific classification
- Domain: Eukaryota
- Kingdom: Animalia
- Phylum: Arthropoda
- Class: Insecta
- Order: Lepidoptera
- Superfamily: Noctuoidea
- Family: Erebidae
- Subfamily: Arctiinae
- Genus: Aemilia
- Species: A. tabaconas

Binomial name
- Aemilia tabaconas (Joicey & Talbot, 1916)

Synonyms
- Carathis tabaconas Joicey & Talbot, 1916

Species of moth

Aemilia tabaconas is a moth of the family Erebidae. It was described by James John Joicey and George Talbot in 1916. It is found in Peru.
