= Pseudohemihyalea ludwigi =

Scientific classification
- Domain: Eukaryota
- Kingdom: Animalia
- Phylum: Arthropoda
- Class: Insecta
- Order: Lepidoptera
- Superfamily: Noctuoidea
- Family: Erebidae
- Subfamily: Arctiinae
- Genus: Pseudohemihyalea
- Species: P. ludwigi

Binomial name
- Pseudohemihyalea ludwigi Beutelspacher, 1984

Species of moth

Pseudohemihyalea ludwigi is a moth in the family Erebidae. It was described by Carlos Rommel Beutelspacher in 1984. It is found in Mexico.
