= Pseudohemihyalea labecula =

Scientific classification
- Kingdom: Animalia
- Phylum: Arthropoda
- Class: Insecta
- Order: Lepidoptera
- Superfamily: Noctuoidea
- Family: Erebidae
- Subfamily: Arctiinae
- Genus: Pseudohemihyalea
- Species: P. labecula

Binomial name
- Pseudohemihyalea labecula (Grote, 1881)

Synonyms
- Halisidota labecula Grote, 1881; Hemihyalea labecula; Hemihyalea splendens griseiventris Rothschild, 1935; Hemihyalea griseiventris

Species of moth

Pseudohemihyalea labecula, the freckled glassy-wing, is a moth in the family Erebidae. It was described by Augustus Radcliffe Grote in 1881. It is found in the United States in southern Nevada, Utah, from Colorado to Arizona, New Mexico and western Texas.

The length of the forewings is 21–29 mm. Adults are on wing from July to early September.

The larvae probably feed on Quercus species.

== Subspecies ==
- Pseudohemihyalea labecula labecula
- Pseudohemihyalea labecula griseiventris Rothschild, 1935 (Texas)
