= Pseudohemihyalea labeculoides =

Scientific classification
- Kingdom: Animalia
- Phylum: Arthropoda
- Class: Insecta
- Order: Lepidoptera
- Superfamily: Noctuoidea
- Family: Erebidae
- Subfamily: Arctiinae
- Genus: Pseudohemihyalea
- Species: P. labeculoides

Binomial name
- Pseudohemihyalea labeculoides Toulgoët, 1995

Species of moth

Pseudohemihyalea labeculoides is a moth in the family Erebidae. It was described by Hervé de Toulgoët in 1995. It is found in Honduras.
