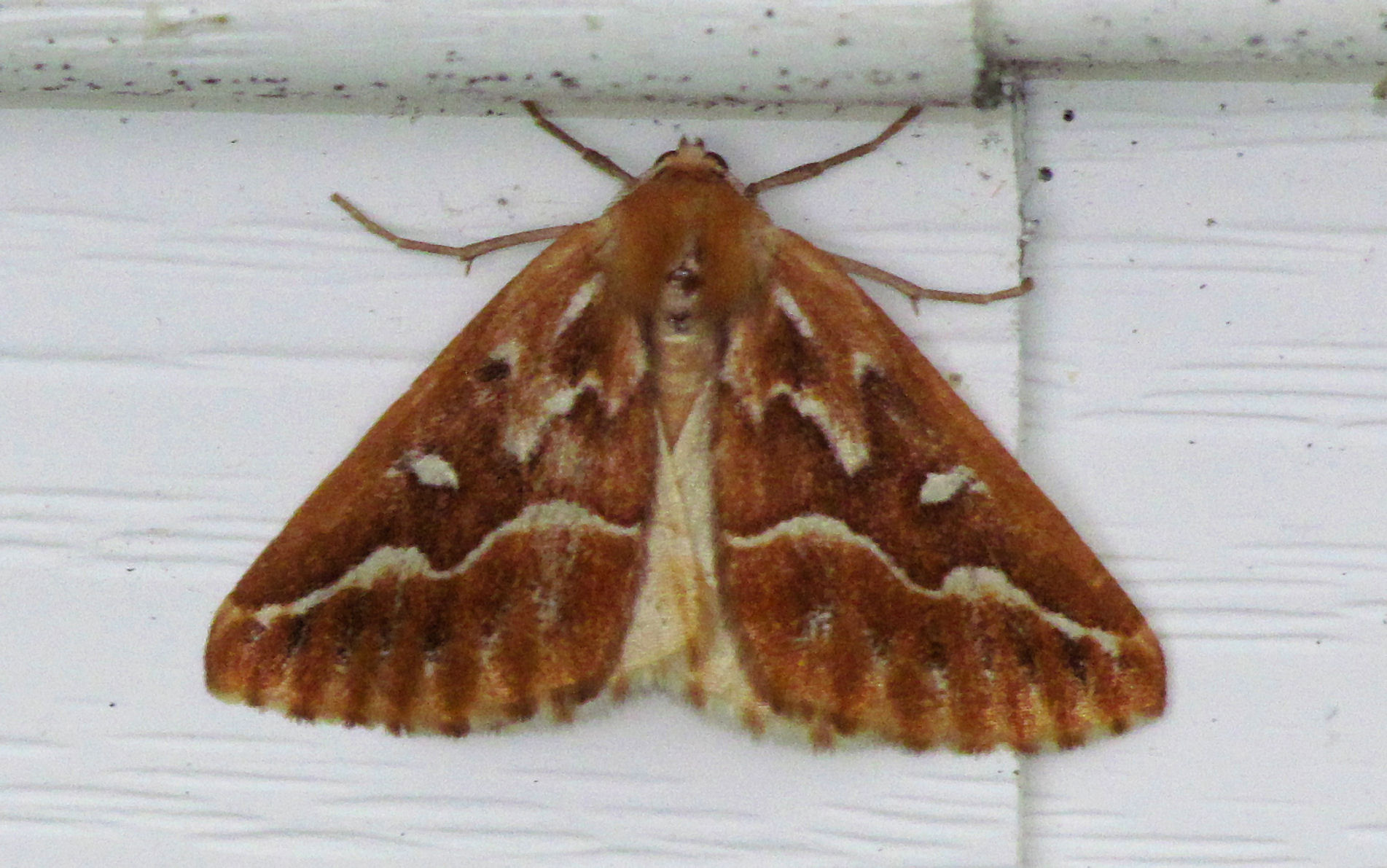
- Northern pine looper (Caripeta piniata)

Scientific classification
- Kingdom: Animalia
- Phylum: Arthropoda
- Clade: Pancrustacea
- Class: Insecta
- Order: Lepidoptera
- Family: Geometridae
- Tribe: Ourapterygini
- Genus: Caripeta; Walker, 1863

= Caripeta =

Genus of moths

Caripeta is a genus of moths in the family Geometridae erected by Francis Walker in 1863.

== Species ==
- Caripeta aequaliaria Grote, 1883
- Caripeta angustiorata Walker, 1863 – brown pine looper
- Caripeta aretaria (Walker, 1860)
- Caripeta canidiaria (Strecker, 1899)
- Caripeta divisata Walker, 1863 – grey spruce looper
- Caripeta hilumaria (Hulst, 1886)
- Caripeta interalbicans Warren, 1904
- Caripeta latiorata Walker, 1863
- Caripeta macularia (Barnes & McDunnough, 1916)
- Caripeta ocellaria (Grossbeck, 1907)
- Caripeta piniata (Packard, 1870) – northern pine looper
- Caripeta pulcherrima (Guedet, 1941)
- Caripeta suffusata Guedet, 1939
- Caripeta triangulata (Barnes & McDunnough, 1916)
