= Pseudohemihyalea melas =

Scientific classification
- Domain: Eukaryota
- Kingdom: Animalia
- Phylum: Arthropoda
- Class: Insecta
- Order: Lepidoptera
- Superfamily: Noctuoidea
- Family: Erebidae
- Subfamily: Arctiinae
- Genus: Pseudohemihyalea
- Species: P. melas

Binomial name
- Pseudohemihyalea melas (Dognin, 1902)

Synonyms
- Opharus melas Dognin, 1902; Hemihyalea melas; Amastus melas (Dognin, 1902)

Species of moth

Pseudohemihyalea melas is a moth in the family Erebidae. It was described by Paul Dognin in 1902. It is found in Colombia.
