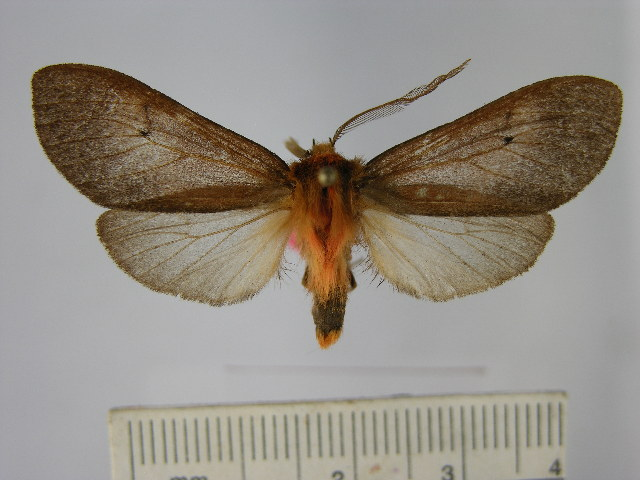

Scientific classification
- Kingdom: Animalia
- Phylum: Arthropoda
- Clade: Pancrustacea
- Class: Insecta
- Order: Lepidoptera
- Superfamily: Noctuoidea
- Family: Erebidae
- Subfamily: Arctiinae
- Genus: Amastus
- Species: A. rubicundus

Binomial name
- Amastus rubicundus (Toulgoët, 1981)

Synonyms
- Elysius rubicundus Toulgoët, 1981

= Amastus rubicundus =

Species of moth

Amastus rubicundus is a moth of the family Erebidae first described by Hervé de Toulgoët in 1981. It is found in Peru.
