= Pseudohemihyalea euornithia =

Scientific classification
- Kingdom: Animalia
- Phylum: Arthropoda
- Class: Insecta
- Order: Lepidoptera
- Superfamily: Noctuoidea
- Family: Erebidae
- Subfamily: Arctiinae
- Genus: Pseudohemihyalea
- Species: P. euornithia

Binomial name
- Pseudohemihyalea euornithia (Dyar, 1914)

Synonyms
- Hemihyalea euornithia Dyar, 1914

Species of moth

Pseudohemihyalea euornithia is a moth in the family Erebidae. It was described by Harrison Gray Dyar Jr. in 1914. It is found in Mexico.
