= Pseudohemihyalea ochracea =

Scientific classification
- Domain: Eukaryota
- Kingdom: Animalia
- Phylum: Arthropoda
- Class: Insecta
- Order: Lepidoptera
- Superfamily: Noctuoidea
- Family: Erebidae
- Subfamily: Arctiinae
- Genus: Pseudohemihyalea
- Species: P. ochracea

Binomial name
- Pseudohemihyalea ochracea (Rothschild, 1909)

Synonyms
- Hemihyalea ochracea Rothschild, 1909; Hemihyalea battyi Rothschild, 1909; Hemihyalea annario Dyar, 1914; Hemihyalea oligocycla Seitz, 1925

Species of moth

Pseudohemihyalea ochracea is a moth in the family Erebidae. It was described by Walter Rothschild in 1909. It is found in Panama, Colombia and Costa Rica.
