= Aemilia peropaca =

Scientific classification
- Domain: Eukaryota
- Kingdom: Animalia
- Phylum: Arthropoda
- Class: Insecta
- Order: Lepidoptera
- Superfamily: Noctuoidea
- Family: Erebidae
- Subfamily: Arctiinae
- Genus: Aemilia
- Species: A. peropaca

Binomial name
- Aemilia peropaca (Seitz, 1920)

Synonyms
- Carathis peropaca Seitz, 1920

Species of moth

Aemilia peropaca is a moth of the family Erebidae. It was described by Seitz in 1920. It is found in Colombia.
