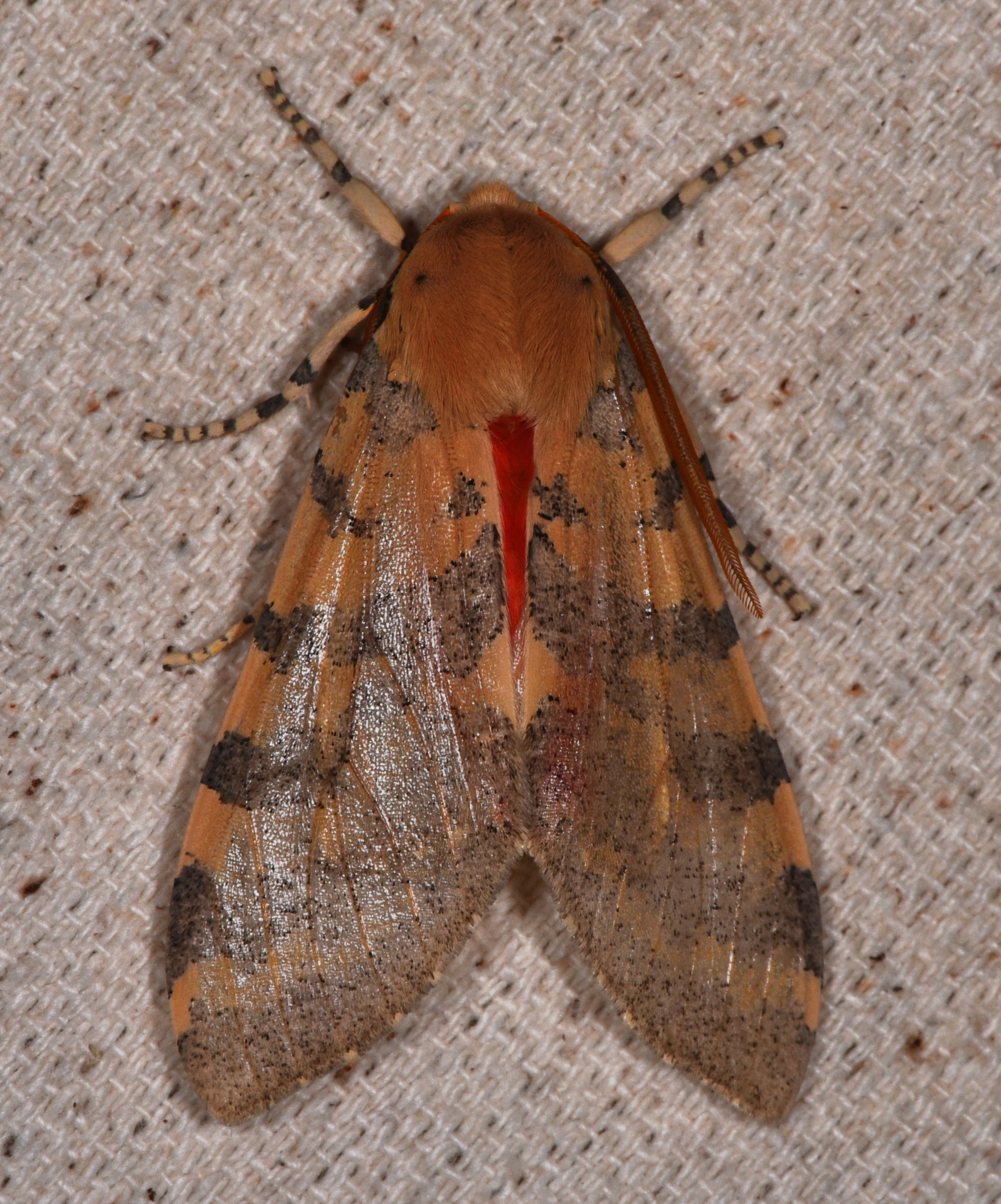

Scientific classification
- Kingdom: Animalia
- Phylum: Arthropoda
- Clade: Pancrustacea
- Class: Insecta
- Order: Lepidoptera
- Superfamily: Noctuoidea
- Family: Erebidae
- Subfamily: Arctiinae
- Genus: Pseudohemihyalea
- Species: P. edwardsii

Binomial name
- Pseudohemihyalea edwardsii (Packard, 1864)

Synonyms
- Halisidota edwardsii Packard, 1864; Hemihyalea edwardsii; Halisidota translucida Walker, [1865]; Phaegoptera quercus Boisduval, 1869; Hemihyalea argillacea Rothschild, 1909; Hemihyalea f. ochreous Meadows, 1939

= Pseudohemihyalea edwardsii =

Species of moth

Pseudohemihyalea edwardsii, or Edwards' glassy-wing, is a moth in the family Erebidae. It was described by Alpheus Spring Packard in 1864. It is found in the United States from western Oregon and the Columbia Gorge in southern Washington south to California, in the south-west east to western New Mexico. The habitat consists of oak woodlands and mixed hardwood forests at low elevations.

The length of the forewings is 27–31 mm.

== Etymology ==
The species is named in honor of actor-entomologist Henry Edwards.

Ps. edwardsii larva
