= Ammalo pachycera =

Scientific classification
- Domain: Eukaryota
- Kingdom: Animalia
- Phylum: Arthropoda
- Class: Insecta
- Order: Lepidoptera
- Superfamily: Noctuoidea
- Family: Erebidae
- Subfamily: Arctiinae
- Genus: Ammalo
- Species: A. pachycera

Binomial name
- Ammalo pachycera (Seitz, 1922)

Synonyms
- Elysius pachycera Seitz, 1922

Species of moth

Ammalo pachycera is a moth of the family Erebidae. It was described by Seitz in 1922. It is found in Bolivia.
