= Pseudohemihyalea splendens =

Scientific classification
- Domain: Eukaryota
- Kingdom: Animalia
- Phylum: Arthropoda
- Class: Insecta
- Order: Lepidoptera
- Superfamily: Noctuoidea
- Family: Erebidae
- Subfamily: Arctiinae
- Genus: Pseudohemihyalea
- Species: P. splendens

Binomial name
- Pseudohemihyalea splendens (Barnes & McDunnough, 1910)

Synonyms
- Hemihyalea splendens Barnes & McDunnough, 1910

Species of moth

Pseudohemihyalea splendens is a moth in the family Erebidae. It was described by William Barnes and James Halliday McDunnough in 1910. It is found from south-eastern Arizona in the US to Mexico.

The length of the forewings is 26–28 mm. Adults are on wing from late July to mid-November.
