= Pachydota drucei =

Scientific classification
- Domain: Eukaryota
- Kingdom: Animalia
- Phylum: Arthropoda
- Class: Insecta
- Order: Lepidoptera
- Superfamily: Noctuoidea
- Family: Erebidae
- Subfamily: Arctiinae
- Genus: Pachydota
- Species: P. drucei

Binomial name
- Pachydota drucei Rothschild, 1909

Synonyms
- Pachydota josefina Schaus, 1910

Species of moth

Pachydota drucei is a moth of the family Erebidae. It was described by Walter Rothschild in 1909. It is found in Mexico and Colombia.
