= Aemilia mincosa =

Scientific classification
- Domain: Eukaryota
- Kingdom: Animalia
- Phylum: Arthropoda
- Class: Insecta
- Order: Lepidoptera
- Superfamily: Noctuoidea
- Family: Erebidae
- Subfamily: Arctiinae
- Genus: Aemilia
- Species: A. mincosa

Binomial name
- Aemilia mincosa (Druce, 1906)

Synonyms
- Halysidota mincosa Druce, 1906; Aemilia mineosa Rothschild, 1910

Species of moth

Aemilia mincosa is a moth of the family Erebidae. It was described by Druce in 1906. It is found in Peru.
