= Amastus modesta =

Scientific classification
- Domain: Eukaryota
- Kingdom: Animalia
- Phylum: Arthropoda
- Class: Insecta
- Order: Lepidoptera
- Superfamily: Noctuoidea
- Family: Erebidae
- Subfamily: Arctiinae
- Genus: Amastus
- Species: A. modesta

Binomial name
- Amastus modesta (Maassen, 1890)

Synonyms
- Phragmatobia modesta Maassen, 1890; Halysidota agatha Schaus, 1924; Elysius agatha (Schaus, 1924)

Species of moth

Amastus modesta is a moth in the family Erebidae. It was described by Peter Maassen in 1890. It is found in Bolivia.
