= Aemilia crassa =

Scientific classification
- Kingdom: Animalia
- Phylum: Arthropoda
- Class: Insecta
- Order: Lepidoptera
- Superfamily: Noctuoidea
- Family: Erebidae
- Subfamily: Arctiinae
- Genus: Aemilia
- Species: A. crassa

Binomial name
- Aemilia crassa (Walker, [1865])

Synonyms
- Automolis crassa Walker, 1865

Species of moth

Aemilia crassa is a moth of the family Erebidae. It was described by Francis Walker in 1865. It is found in Colombia.
