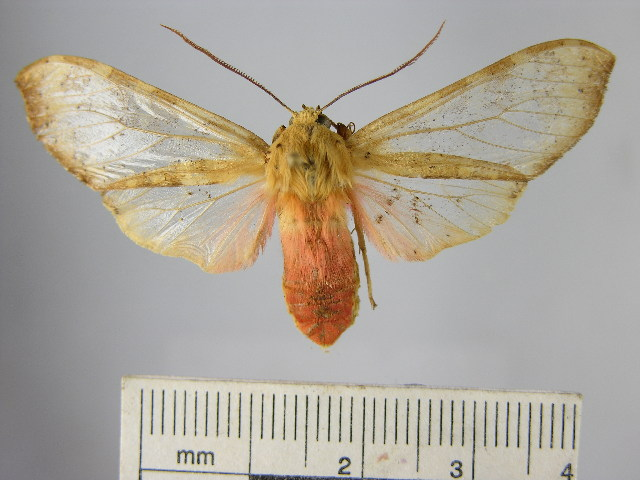

Scientific classification
- Domain: Eukaryota
- Kingdom: Animalia
- Phylum: Arthropoda
- Class: Insecta
- Order: Lepidoptera
- Superfamily: Noctuoidea
- Family: Erebidae
- Subfamily: Arctiinae
- Genus: Pseudohemihyalea
- Species: P. mansueta

Binomial name
- Pseudohemihyalea mansueta (H. Edwards, 1884)

Synonyms
- Halysidota mansueta H. Edwards, 1884; Hemihyalea mansueta; Hemihyalea mansueta ab. darabana Strand, 1919; Hemihyalea mansueta ab. niger Seitz, 1925

= Pseudohemihyalea mansueta =

Species of moth

Pseudohemihyalea mansueta is a moth in the family Erebidae. It was described by Henry Edwards in 1884. It is found in Mexico.
