= Pachydota albiceps =

Scientific classification
- Kingdom: Animalia
- Phylum: Arthropoda
- Class: Insecta
- Order: Lepidoptera
- Superfamily: Noctuoidea
- Family: Erebidae
- Subfamily: Arctiinae
- Genus: Pachydota
- Species: P. albiceps

Binomial name
- Pachydota albiceps Walker, 1856

Synonyms
- Eucereon albiceps Walker, 1856; Pseudapistosia saduca Druce, 1895; Pachydota inermis Schaus, 1910; Pachydota albiceps ab. luciana Strand, 1919

Species of moth

Pachydota albiceps is a moth of the family Erebidae. It was described by Francis Walker in 1856. It is found in Costa Rica, Panama, Venezuela, Suriname, Brazil, Guyana, French Guiana, Guadeloupe, St. Kitts, St. Lucia and Martinique.
