= Pachydota striata =

Scientific classification
- Domain: Eukaryota
- Kingdom: Animalia
- Phylum: Arthropoda
- Class: Insecta
- Order: Lepidoptera
- Superfamily: Noctuoidea
- Family: Erebidae
- Subfamily: Arctiinae
- Genus: Pachydota
- Species: P. striata

Binomial name
- Pachydota striata (Dognin, 1893)

Synonyms
- Lophocampa striata Dognin, 1893

Species of moth

Pachydota striata is a moth of the subfamily Arctiinae. It was described by Paul Dognin in 1893. It is found in Colombia, Venezuela, Ecuador and Peru.
