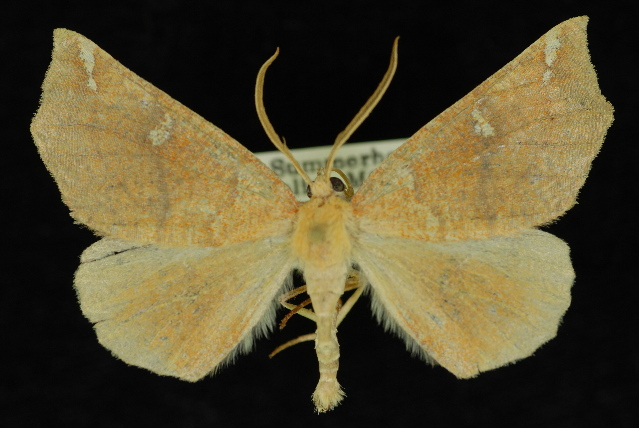

Scientific classification
- Domain: Eukaryota
- Kingdom: Animalia
- Phylum: Arthropoda
- Class: Insecta
- Order: Lepidoptera
- Family: Geometridae
- Genus: Caripeta
- Species: C. macularia

Binomial name
- Caripeta macularia (Barnes & McDunnough, 1916)

Synonyms
- Gonodontis macularia Barnes & McDunnough, 1916

= Caripeta macularia =

Species of moth

Caripeta macularia is a species of moth in the family Geometridae first described by William Barnes and James Halliday McDunnough in 1916. It is found in North America.

The MONA or Hodges number for Caripeta macularia is 6874.
