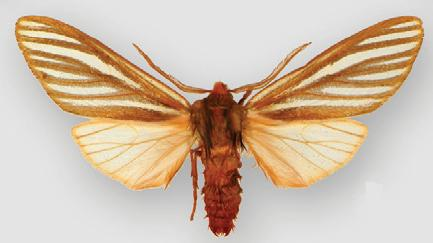
- Pseudohemihyalea potosi (male)

Scientific classification
- Domain: Eukaryota
- Kingdom: Animalia
- Phylum: Arthropoda
- Class: Insecta
- Order: Lepidoptera
- Superfamily: Noctuoidea
- Family: Erebidae
- Subfamily: Arctiinae
- Genus: Pseudohemihyalea
- Species: P. potosi

Binomial name
- Pseudohemihyalea potosi Schmidt, 2009

= Pseudohemihyalea potosi =

Species of moth

Pseudohemihyalea potosi is a moth of the family Erebidae. It has currently only been found on Cerro Potosi, the highest peak in the Sierra Madre Oriental in the state of Nuevo Leon, Mexico.

The length of the forewings is 25 mm or more.

The larvae probably feed on Pinus species.
