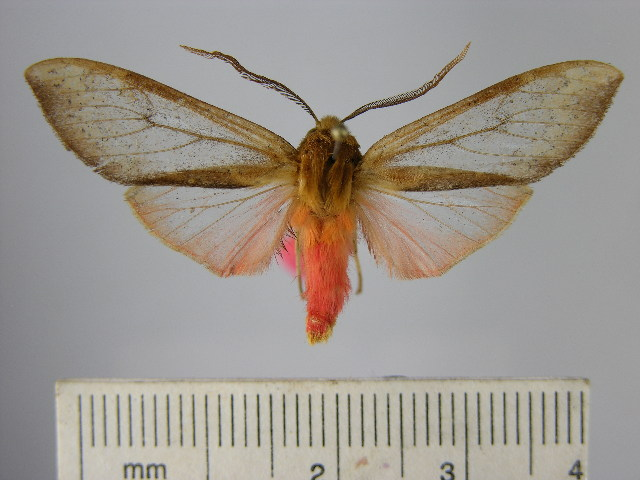

Scientific classification
- Domain: Eukaryota
- Kingdom: Animalia
- Phylum: Arthropoda
- Class: Insecta
- Order: Lepidoptera
- Superfamily: Noctuoidea
- Family: Erebidae
- Subfamily: Arctiinae
- Genus: Pseudohemihyalea
- Species: P. daraba

Binomial name
- Pseudohemihyalea daraba (H. Druce, 1894)

Synonyms
- Phaegoptera daraba H. Druce, 1894; Hemihyalea daraba

= Pseudohemihyalea daraba =

Species of moth

Pseudohemihyalea daraba is a moth in the family Erebidae. It was described by Herbert Druce in 1894. It is found in Mexico.
