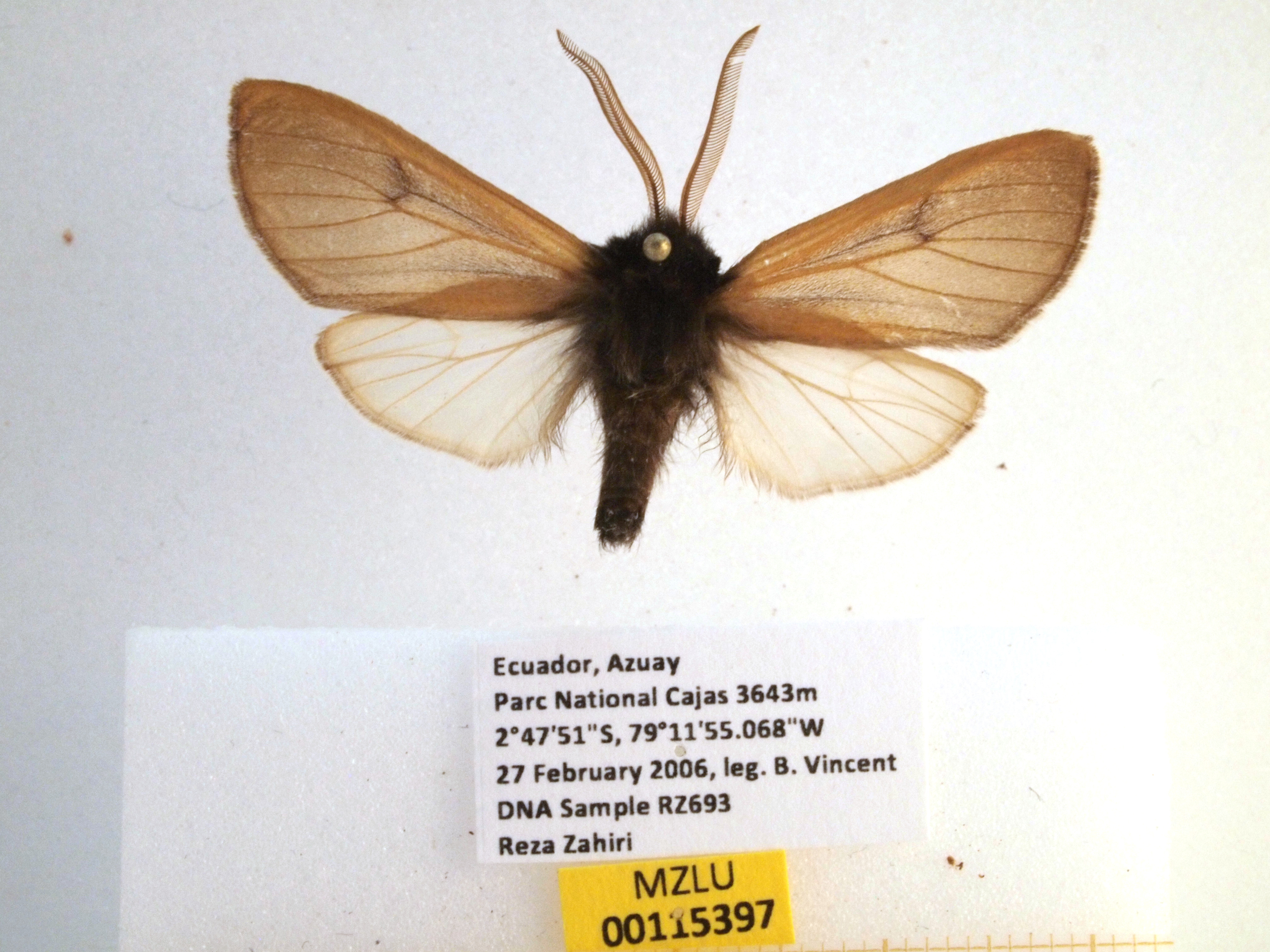

Scientific classification
- Kingdom: Animalia
- Phylum: Arthropoda
- Class: Insecta
- Order: Lepidoptera
- Superfamily: Noctuoidea
- Family: Erebidae
- Subfamily: Arctiinae
- Genus: Amastus
- Species: A. bicolor

Binomial name
- Amastus bicolor (Maassen, 1890)

Synonyms
- Hebena bicolor Maassen, 1890; Elysius bicolor (Maassen, 1890)

= Amastus bicolor =

Species of moth

Amastus bicolor is a moth of the family Erebidae. It was described by Peter Maassen in 1890. It is found in Ecuador and Peru.
