= Pseudohemihyalea despaignei =

Scientific classification
- Kingdom: Animalia
- Phylum: Arthropoda
- Class: Insecta
- Order: Lepidoptera
- Superfamily: Noctuoidea
- Family: Erebidae
- Subfamily: Arctiinae
- Genus: Pseudohemihyalea
- Species: P. despaignei

Binomial name
- Pseudohemihyalea despaignei (Toulgoët, 1982)

Synonyms
- Hemihyalea despaignei Toulgoët, 1982

Species of moth

Pseudohemihyalea despaignei is a moth in the family Erebidae. It was described by Hervé de Toulgoët in 1982. It is found in Panama.
