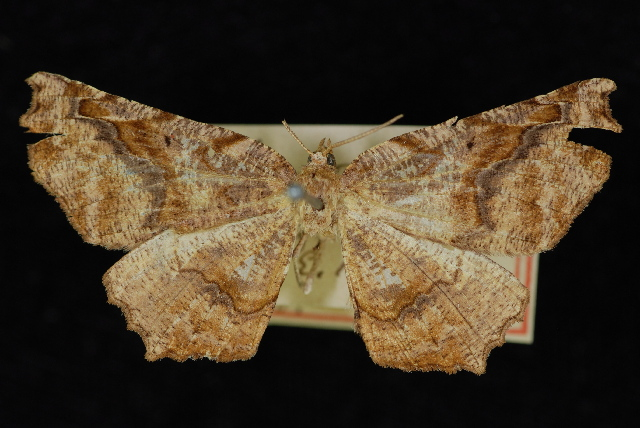

Scientific classification
- Domain: Eukaryota
- Kingdom: Animalia
- Phylum: Arthropoda
- Class: Insecta
- Order: Lepidoptera
- Family: Geometridae
- Genus: Caripeta
- Species: C. canidiaria

Binomial name
- Caripeta canidiaria (Strecker, 1899)

= Caripeta canidiaria =

Species of moth

Caripeta canidiaria is a species of geometrid moth in the family Geometridae. It is found in Central America and North America.

The MONA or Hodges number for Caripeta canidiaria is 6872.
