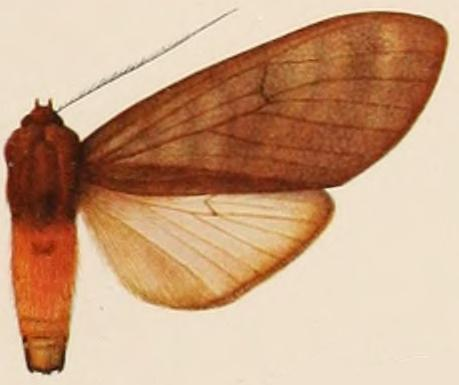

Scientific classification
- Domain: Eukaryota
- Kingdom: Animalia
- Phylum: Arthropoda
- Class: Insecta
- Order: Lepidoptera
- Superfamily: Noctuoidea
- Family: Erebidae
- Subfamily: Arctiinae
- Genus: Amastus
- Species: A. umber

Binomial name
- Amastus umber Rothschild, 1909

= Amastus umber =

Species of moth

Amastus umber is a moth of the family Erebidae first described by Walter Rothschild in 1909. It is found in Venezuela.
