= Pseudohemihyalea nimbipicta =

Scientific classification
- Domain: Eukaryota
- Kingdom: Animalia
- Phylum: Arthropoda
- Class: Insecta
- Order: Lepidoptera
- Superfamily: Noctuoidea
- Family: Erebidae
- Subfamily: Arctiinae
- Genus: Pseudohemihyalea
- Species: P. nimbipicta

Binomial name
- Pseudohemihyalea nimbipicta (Dyar, 1914)

Synonyms
- Hemihyalea nimbipicta Dyar, 1914

Species of moth

Pseudohemihyalea nimbipicta is a moth in the family Erebidae. It was described by Harrison Gray Dyar Jr. in 1914. It is found in Mexico.
