= Pseudohemihyalea hampsoni =

Scientific classification
- Domain: Eukaryota
- Kingdom: Animalia
- Phylum: Arthropoda
- Class: Insecta
- Order: Lepidoptera
- Superfamily: Noctuoidea
- Family: Erebidae
- Subfamily: Arctiinae
- Genus: Pseudohemihyalea
- Species: P. hampsoni

Binomial name
- Pseudohemihyalea hampsoni (Joicey & Talbot, 1916)

Synonyms
- Hemihyalea hampsoni Joicey & Talbot, 1916

Species of moth

Pseudohemihyalea hampsoni is a moth in the family Erebidae. It was described by James John Joicey and George Talbot in 1916. It is found in French Guiana.
