= Pseudohemihyalea carteronae =

Scientific classification
- Kingdom: Animalia
- Phylum: Arthropoda
- Class: Insecta
- Order: Lepidoptera
- Superfamily: Noctuoidea
- Family: Erebidae
- Subfamily: Arctiinae
- Genus: Pseudohemihyalea
- Species: P. carteronae

Binomial name
- Pseudohemihyalea carteronae (Toulgoët, 1982)

Synonyms
- Hemihyalea carteronae Toulgoët, 1982

Species of moth

Pseudohemihyalea carteronae is a moth in the family Erebidae. It was described by Hervé de Toulgoët in 1982. It is found in Costa Rica.
