= Caripeta triangulata =

Scientific classification
- Domain: Eukaryota
- Kingdom: Animalia
- Phylum: Arthropoda
- Class: Insecta
- Order: Lepidoptera
- Family: Geometridae
- Genus: Caripeta
- Species: C. triangulata

Binomial name
- Caripeta triangulata (Barnes & McDunnough, 1916)

Synonyms
- Sabulodes triangulata Barnes & McDunnough, 1916

Species of moth

Caripeta triangulata is a species of moth in the family Geometridae first described by William Barnes and James Halliday McDunnough in 1916. It is found in Central and North America.

The MONA or Hodges number for Caripeta triangulata is 6957.
