= Pseudohemihyalea carmen =

Scientific classification
- Kingdom: Animalia
- Phylum: Arthropoda
- Class: Insecta
- Order: Lepidoptera
- Superfamily: Noctuoidea
- Family: Erebidae
- Subfamily: Arctiinae
- Genus: Pseudohemihyalea
- Species: P. carmen

Binomial name
- Pseudohemihyalea carmen (Schaus, 1920)

Synonyms
- Aemilia carmen Schaus, 1920; Leucanopsis atrata Toulgoët, 2003

Species of moth

Pseudohemihyalea carmen is a moth in the family Erebidae. It was described by William Schaus in 1920. It is found in Guatemala.
