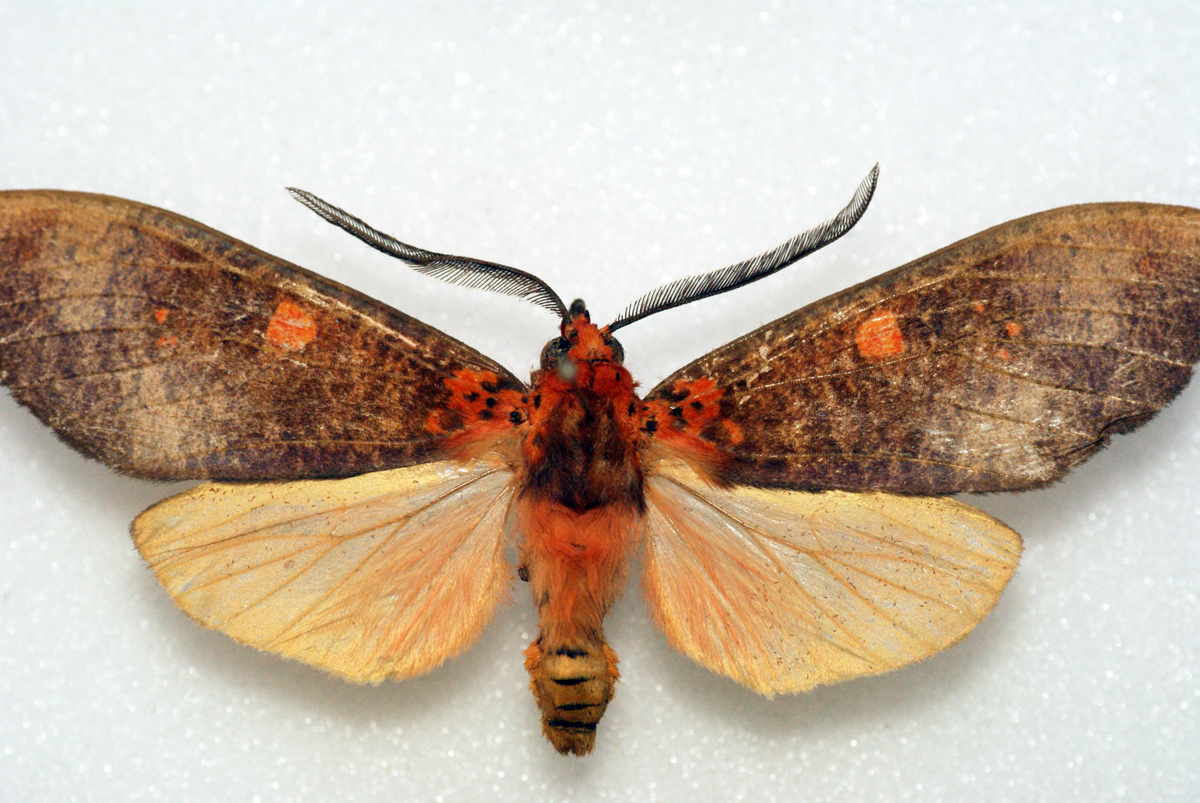

Scientific classification
- Domain: Eukaryota
- Kingdom: Animalia
- Phylum: Arthropoda
- Class: Insecta
- Order: Lepidoptera
- Superfamily: Noctuoidea
- Family: Erebidae
- Subfamily: Arctiinae
- Genus: Ammalo
- Species: A. helops

Binomial name
- Ammalo helops (Cramer, [1775])

Synonyms
- Phalaena helops Cramer, [1775]; Bombyx helops Cramer, 1775; Ammalo fervidus Walker, 1855; Halysidota megapyrrha Walker, [1865]; Halysidota chrysogaster Walker, [1865]; Ammalo metapyrrha Rothschild, 1910; Ammalo impunctus Grote, [1866]

= Ammalo helops =

Species of moth

Ammalo helops is a moth of the family Erebidae first described by Pieter Cramer in 1775. It is found in Mexico, Guatemala, Costa Rica, Honduras, Panama, Jamaica, Cuba, Haiti, Grenada, Trinidad, Amazonas, Brazil, Venezuela, Suriname, Peru and Colombia.
