= Pseudohemihyalea schausi =

Scientific classification
- Domain: Eukaryota
- Kingdom: Animalia
- Phylum: Arthropoda
- Class: Insecta
- Order: Lepidoptera
- Superfamily: Noctuoidea
- Family: Erebidae
- Subfamily: Arctiinae
- Genus: Pseudohemihyalea
- Species: P. schausi

Binomial name
- Pseudohemihyalea schausi (Rothschild, 1935)

Synonyms
- Hemihyalea schausi Rothschild, 1935

Species of moth

Pseudohemihyalea schausi is a moth in the family Erebidae. It was described by Walter Rothschild in 1935. It is found in Costa Rica.
