= Hemihyalea =

Scientific classification
- Kingdom: Animalia
- Phylum: Arthropoda
- Class: Insecta
- Order: Lepidoptera
- Superfamily: Noctuoidea
- Family: Erebidae
- Subfamily: Arctiinae
- Genus: Hemihyalea; Hampson, 1901
- Species: H. cornea

Binomial name
- Hemihyalea cornea (Herrich-Schäffer, [1853])

Synonyms
- Generic: Hemihyalae (lapsus); Specific: Phaegoptera cornea Herrich-Schäffer, [1853]

Genus of moths

Hemihyalea is a monotypic moth genus in the family Erebidae erected by George Hampson in 1901. Its only species, Hemihyalea cornea, was first described by Gottlieb August Wilhelm Herrich-Schäffer in 1853.

== Taxonomy ==
The type species, Hemihyalea cornea, has been proposed for inclusion in Amastus, and other species that were previously classified in Hemihyalea have consequently been moved to the re-established genus Pseudohemihyalea. It is unclear at present whether Hemihyalea is a valid genus at all, and if so, which species other than H. cornea it would contain.

== Distribution ==
Hemihyalea cornea is found in Mexico, Guatemala, Costa Rica, Panama, Colombia and Venezuela.
