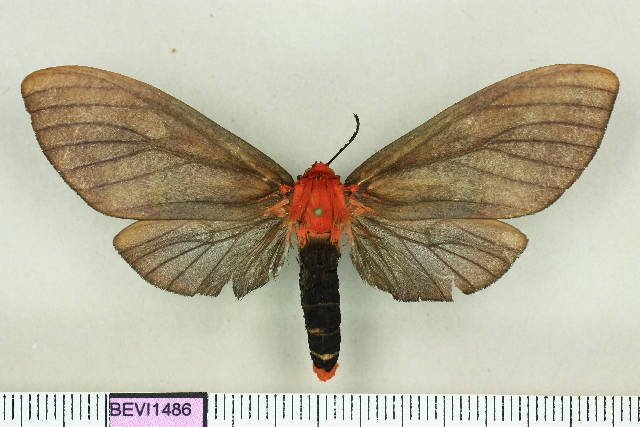

Scientific classification
- Domain: Eukaryota
- Kingdom: Animalia
- Phylum: Arthropoda
- Class: Insecta
- Order: Lepidoptera
- Superfamily: Noctuoidea
- Family: Erebidae
- Subfamily: Arctiinae
- Genus: Pseudohemihyalea
- Species: P. klagesi

Binomial name
- Pseudohemihyalea klagesi (Rothschild, 1909)

Synonyms
- Ammalo klagesi Rothschild, 1909; Hemihyalea klagesi

= Pseudohemihyalea klagesi =

Species of moth

Pseudohemihyalea klagesi is a moth in the family Erebidae. It was described by Walter Rothschild in 1909. It is found in Brazil.
