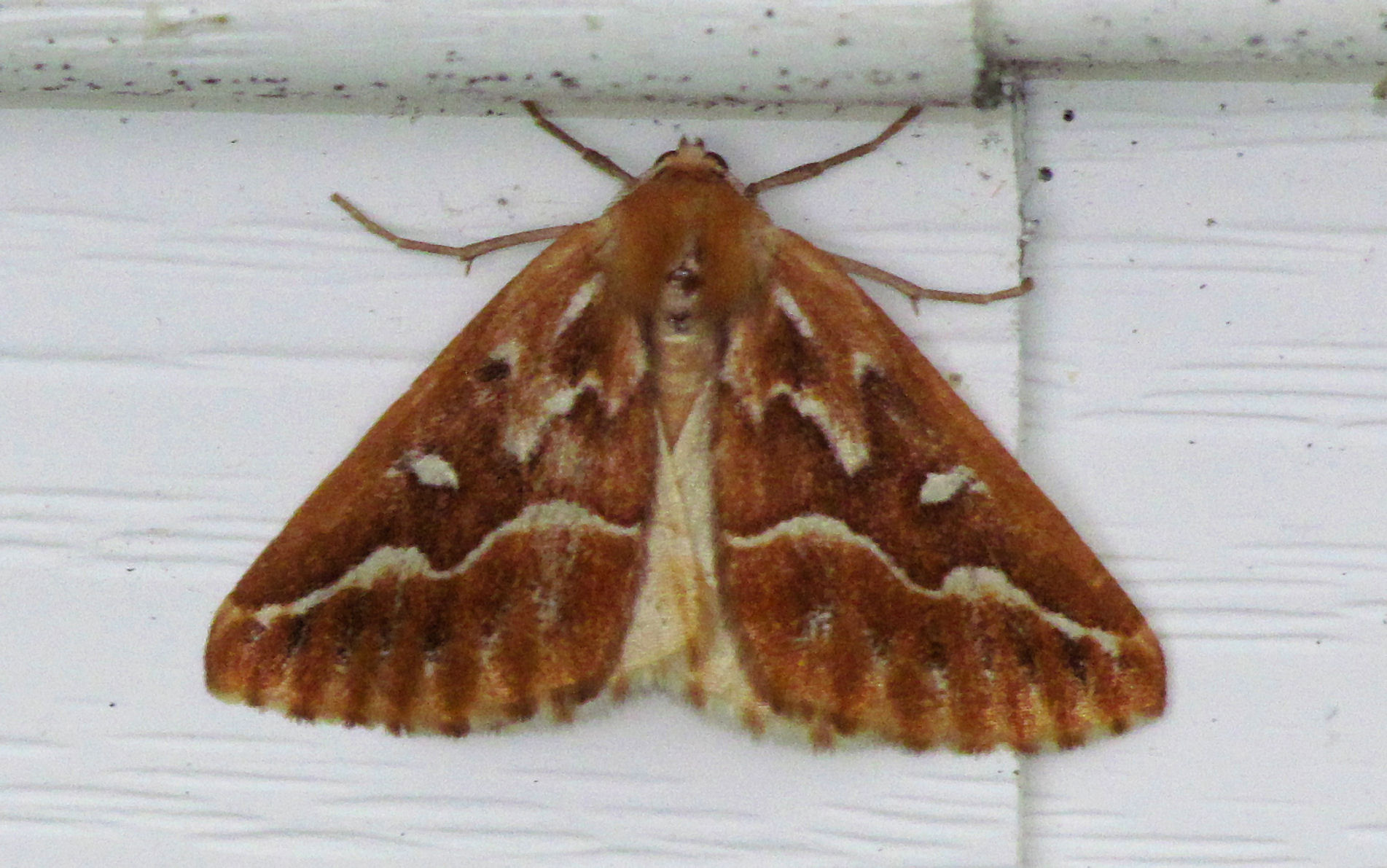

Scientific classification
- Kingdom: Animalia
- Phylum: Arthropoda
- Clade: Pancrustacea
- Class: Insecta
- Order: Lepidoptera
- Family: Geometridae
- Genus: Caripeta
- Species: C. piniata

Binomial name
- Caripeta piniata (Packard, 1870)

Synonyms
- Caripeta seductaria Strecker, 1899; Parennomos piniata Packard, 1870

= Caripeta piniata =

Species of moth

Caripeta piniata, the northern pine looper, is a species of geometrid moth in the family Geometridae. It is found in North America.

The MONA or Hodges number for Caripeta piniata is 6864.
