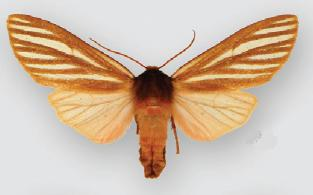
- Pseudohemihyalea ambigua (female)
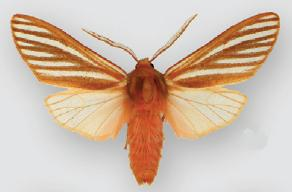
- Pseudohemihyalea ambigua (male)

Scientific classification
- Domain: Eukaryota
- Kingdom: Animalia
- Phylum: Arthropoda
- Class: Insecta
- Order: Lepidoptera
- Superfamily: Noctuoidea
- Family: Erebidae
- Subfamily: Arctiinae
- Genus: Pseudohemihyalea
- Species: P. ambigua

Binomial name
- Pseudohemihyalea ambigua (Strecker, 1878)

Synonyms
- Halisidota ambigua Strecker, 1878; Seirarctia bolteri Edwards, 1885; Aemilia ambigua

= Pseudohemihyalea ambigua =

Species of moth

Pseudohemihyalea ambigua, the red-banded aemilia, is a moth of the family Erebidae. It is found from southern Wyoming to Durango, Mexico.

The length of the forewings is about 24 mm for females and 22 mm in males. Adults are on wing from June to August.

The larvae feed on Pinus ponderosa.
