= Lobocleta griseata =

Scientific classification
- Kingdom: Animalia
- Phylum: Arthropoda
- Class: Insecta
- Order: Lepidoptera
- Family: Geometridae
- Tribe: Sterrhini
- Genus: Lobocleta
- Species: L. griseata

Binomial name
- Lobocleta griseata (Cassino, 1931)

Species of moth

Lobocleta griseata is a species of geometrid moth in the family Geometridae. It is found in North America.

The MONA or Hodges number for Lobocleta griseata is 7099.
