= Protoproutia laredoata =

Scientific classification
- Kingdom: Animalia
- Phylum: Arthropoda
- Class: Insecta
- Order: Lepidoptera
- Family: Geometridae
- Tribe: Sterrhini
- Genus: Protoproutia
- Species: P. laredoata

Binomial name
- Protoproutia laredoata (Cassino, 1931)

Species of moth

Protoproutia laredoata is a species of geometrid moth in the family Geometridae. It is found in North America.

The MONA or Hodges number for Protoproutia laredoata is 7093.
