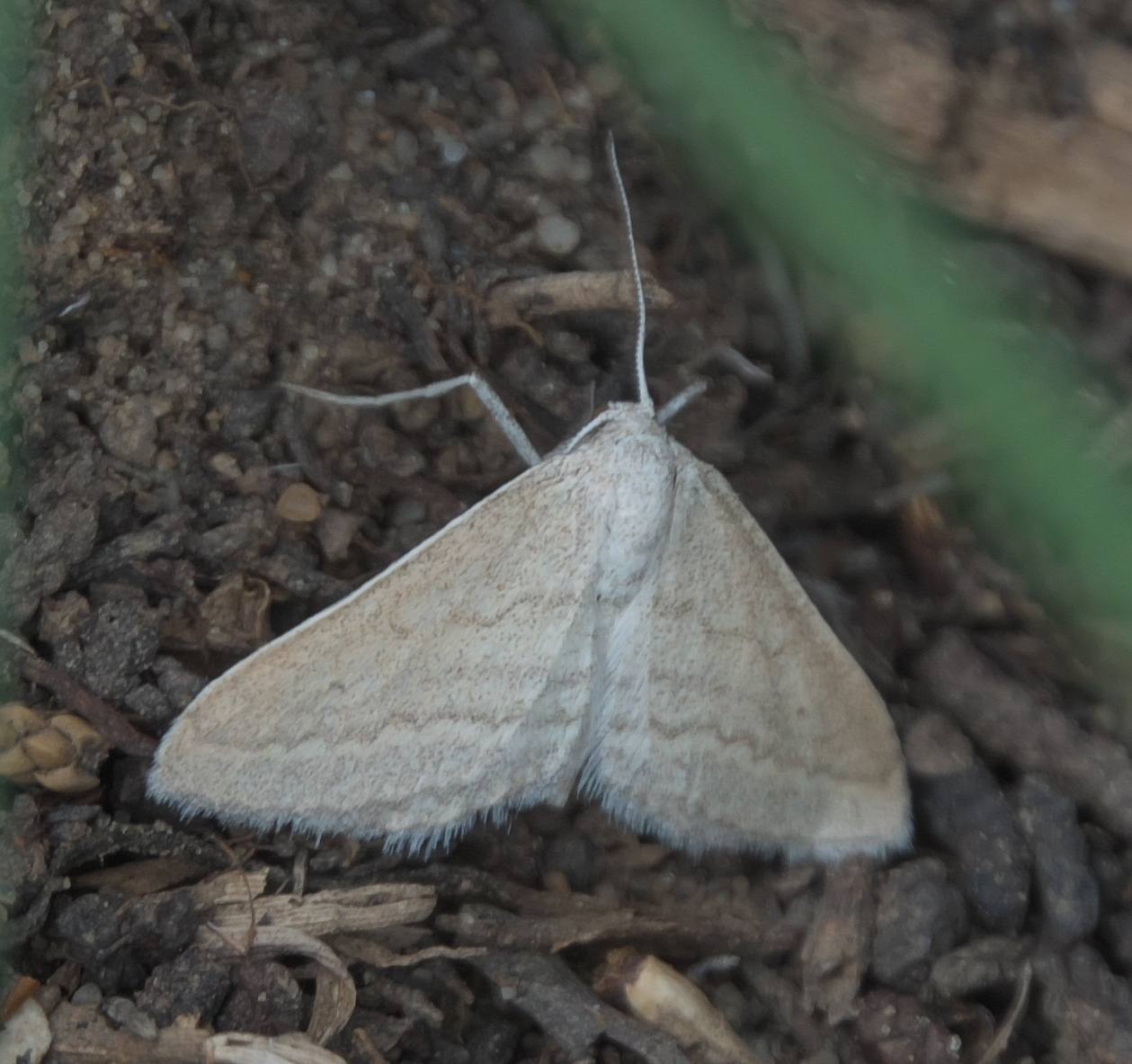
- Lobocleta plemyraria, Oklahoma

Scientific classification
- Kingdom: Animalia
- Phylum: Arthropoda
- Class: Insecta
- Order: Lepidoptera
- Family: Geometridae
- Tribe: Sterrhini
- Genus: Lobocleta
- Species: L. plemyraria

Binomial name
- Lobocleta plemyraria (Guenée in Boisduval & Guenée, 1858)

= Lobocleta plemyraria =

Species of moth

Lobocleta plemyraria, the straight-lined wave, is a species of geometrid moth in the family Geometridae. It is found in North America.

The MONA or Hodges number for Lobocleta plemyraria is 7097.
