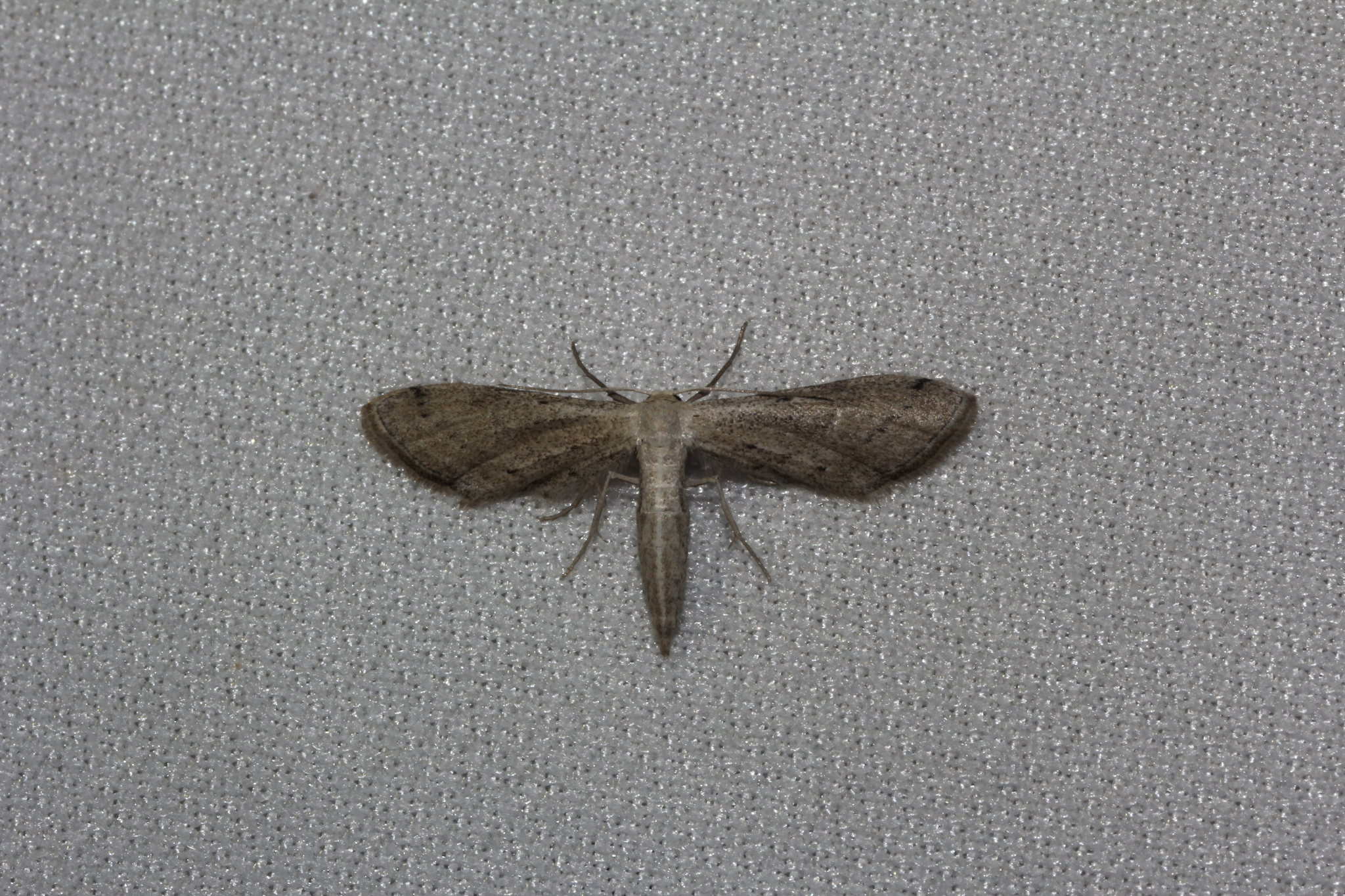

Scientific classification
- Kingdom: Animalia
- Phylum: Arthropoda
- Clade: Pancrustacea
- Class: Insecta
- Order: Lepidoptera
- Family: Geometridae
- Tribe: Sterrhini
- Genus: Euacidalia
- Species: E. sericearia

Binomial name
- Euacidalia sericearia Packard, 1873

= Euacidalia sericearia =

Species of moth

Euacidalia sericearia is a species of geometrid moth in the family Geometridae. It is found in North America.

The MONA or Hodges number for Euacidalia sericearia is 7087.
