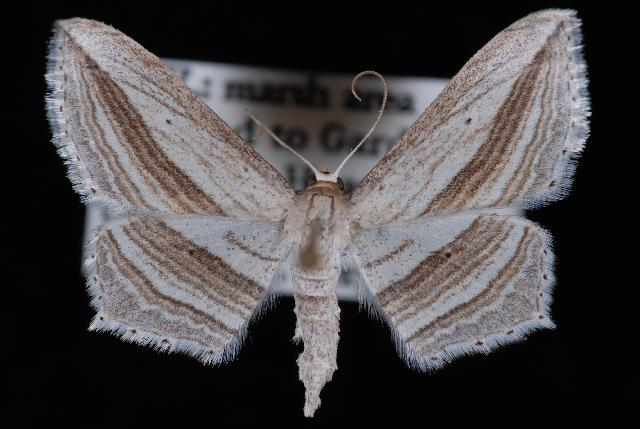

Scientific classification
- Kingdom: Animalia
- Phylum: Arthropoda
- Class: Insecta
- Order: Lepidoptera
- Family: Geometridae
- Subfamily: Sterrhinae
- Tribe: Sterrhini
- Genus: Arcobara
- Species: A. multilineata

Binomial name
- Arcobara multilineata (Hulst, 1887)

Synonyms
- Pigia multilineata Hulst, 1887; Scopula multilineata

= Arcobara multilineata =

Species of moth

Arcobara multilineata is a moth of the family Geometridae. It is found in south-eastern Arizona and Mexico.

The length of the forewings is 10–12 mm.
