= Cleta (disambiguation) =

Cleta is one of the Charites in Greek mythology.

Cleta may also refer to:

- Cleta (moth), a genus of moths in the family Geometridae
- Cleta Mitchell (born 1950), American politician

== See also ==
- Clete, a given name
