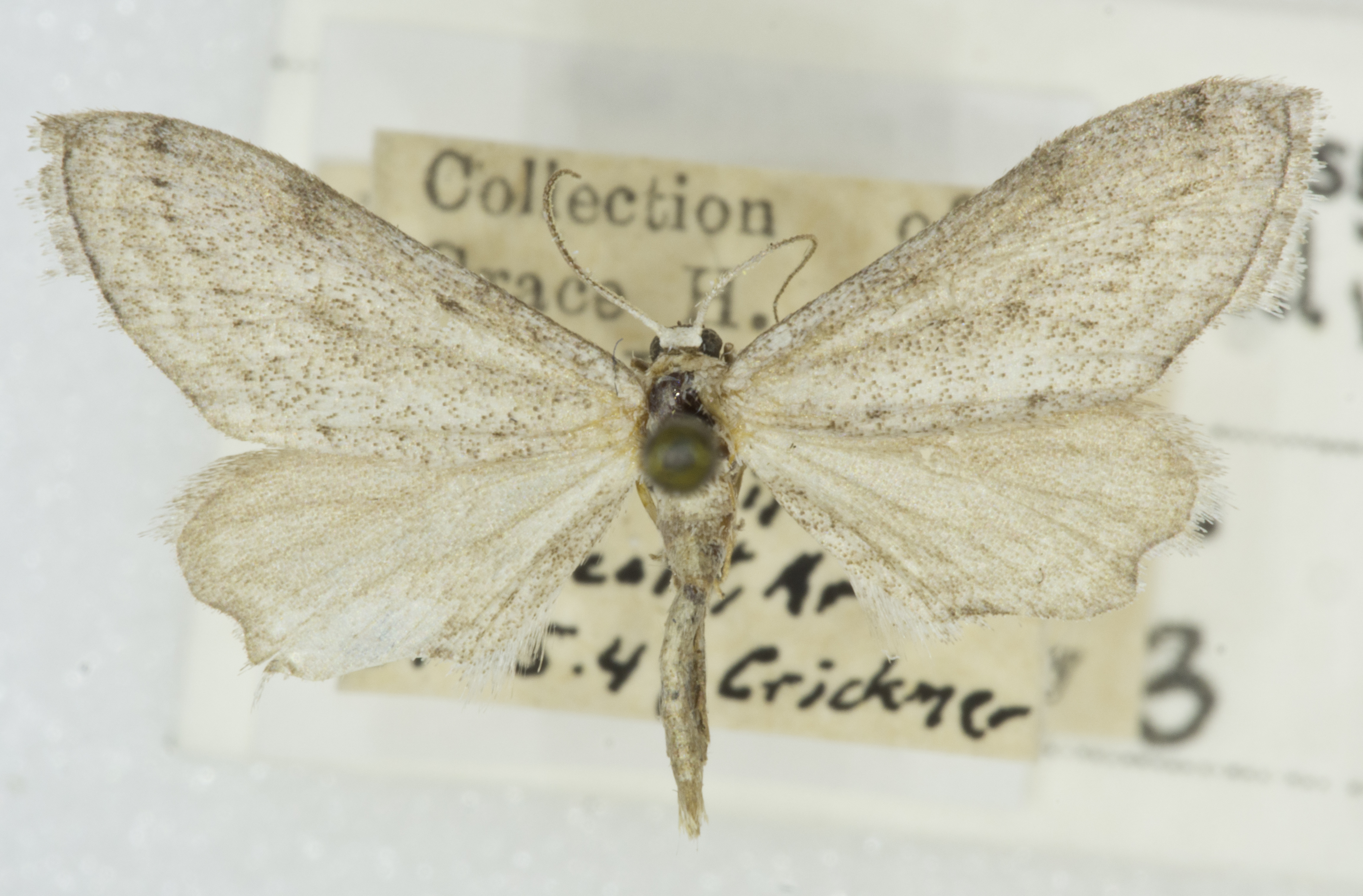

Scientific classification
- Kingdom: Animalia
- Phylum: Arthropoda
- Class: Insecta
- Order: Lepidoptera
- Family: Geometridae
- Tribe: Sterrhini
- Genus: Euacidalia
- Species: E. quakerata

Binomial name
- Euacidalia quakerata Cassino, 1927

= Euacidalia quakerata =

Species of moth

Euacidalia quakerata is a species of geometrid moth in the family Geometridae. It is found in North America.

The MONA or Hodges number for Euacidalia quakerata is 7089.
