= Lobocleta granitaria =

Scientific classification
- Domain: Eukaryota
- Kingdom: Animalia
- Phylum: Arthropoda
- Class: Insecta
- Order: Lepidoptera
- Family: Geometridae
- Genus: Lobocleta
- Species: L. granitaria

Binomial name
- Lobocleta granitaria (Packard, 1871)

Species of moth

Lobocleta granitaria is a species of geometrid moth in the family Geometridae. It was described by Alpheus Spring Packard in 1871 and is found in North America.

The MONA or Hodges number for Lobocleta granitaria is 7095.
