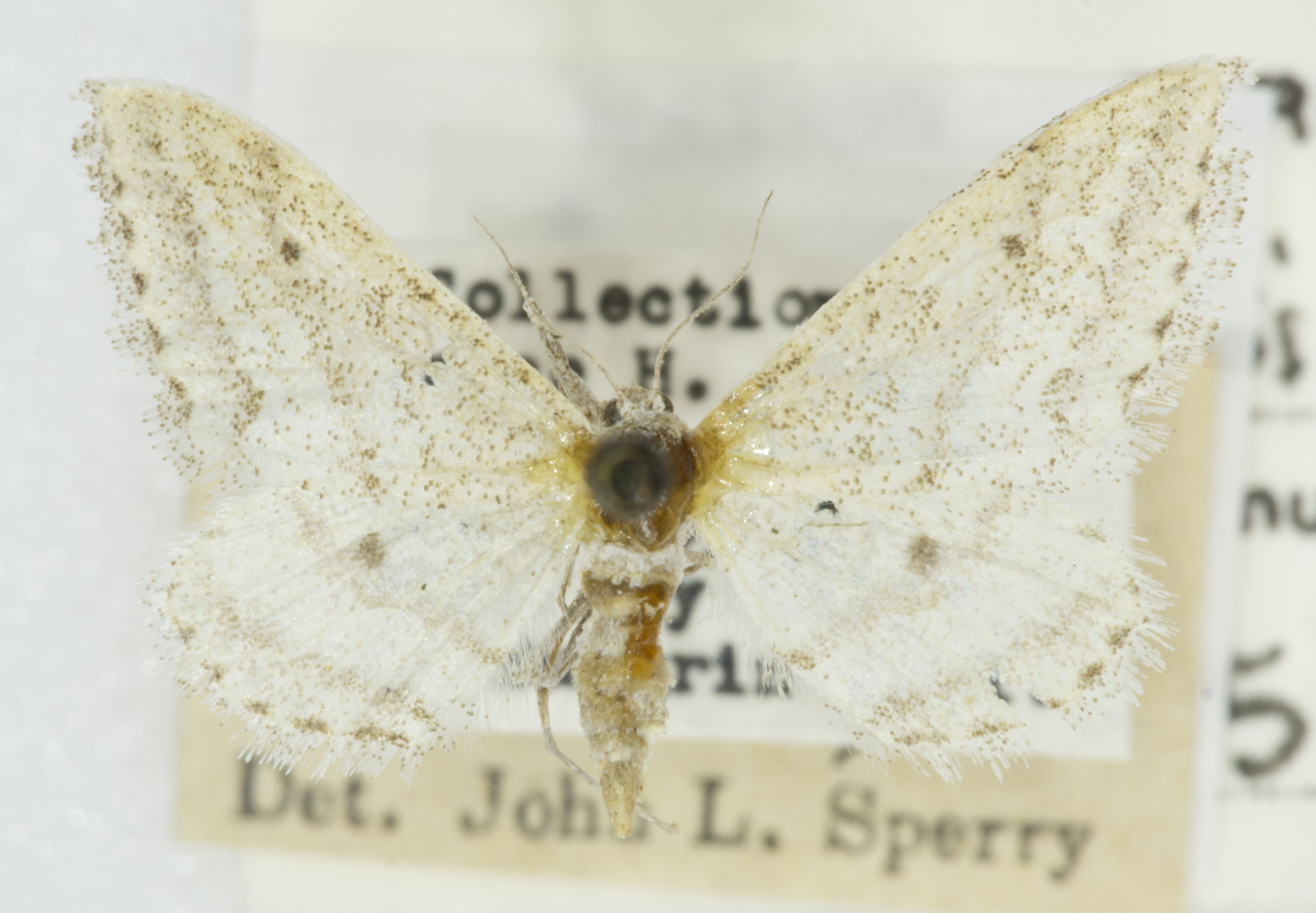

Scientific classification
- Kingdom: Animalia
- Phylum: Arthropoda
- Class: Insecta
- Order: Lepidoptera
- Family: Geometridae
- Genus: Lobocleta
- Species: L. lanceolata

Binomial name
- Lobocleta lanceolata (Hulst, 1896)

= Lobocleta lanceolata =

Species of moth

Lobocleta lanceolata is a species of geometrid moth in the family Geometridae. It is found in North America.

The MONA or Hodges number for Lobocleta lanceolata is 7098.
