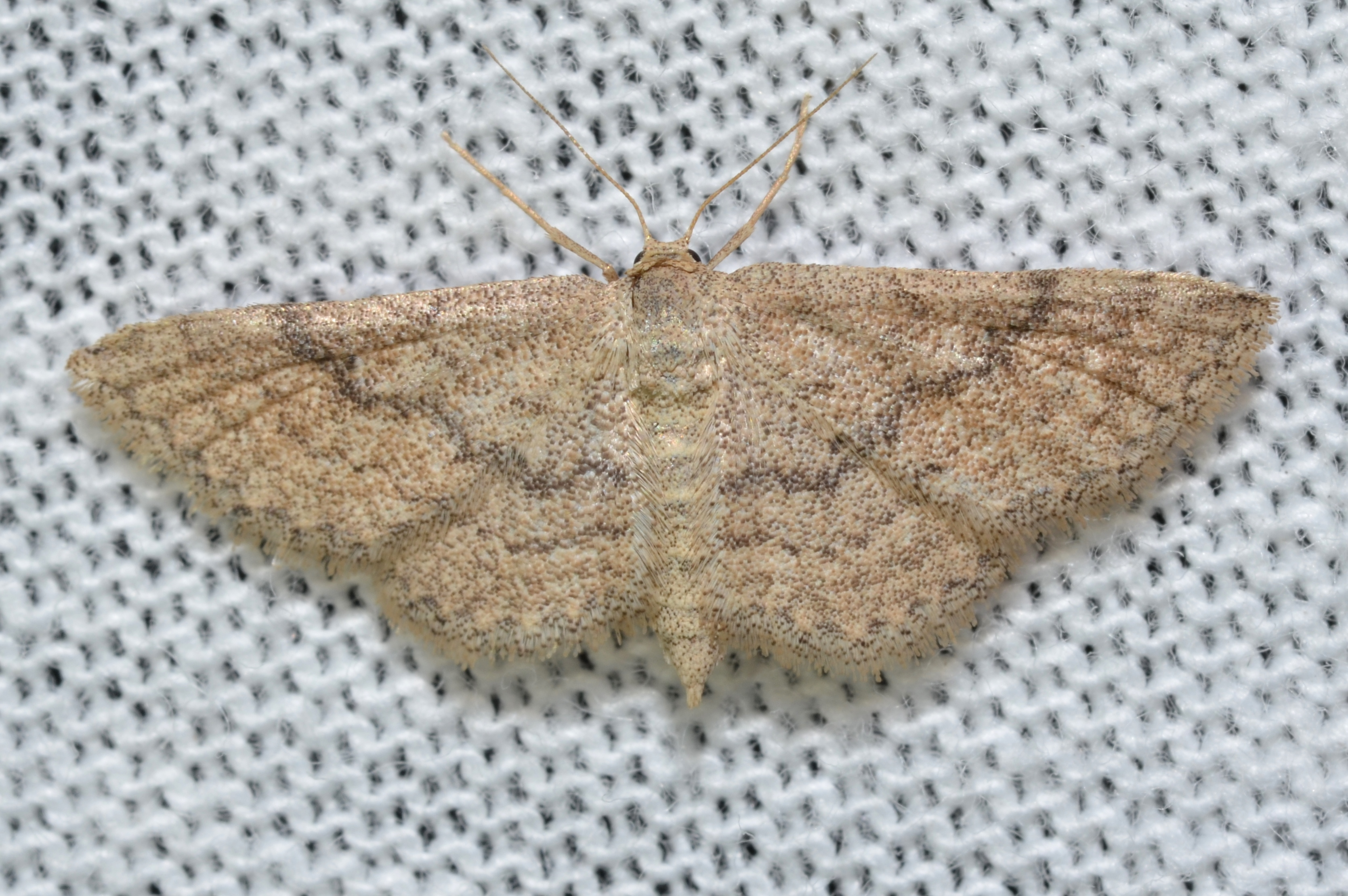

Scientific classification
- Kingdom: Animalia
- Phylum: Arthropoda
- Class: Insecta
- Order: Lepidoptera
- Family: Geometridae
- Genus: Lobocleta
- Species: L. ossularia

Binomial name
- Lobocleta ossularia (Geyer, 1837)

Synonyms
- Leptomeris ossularia Geyer, 1837; Acidalia favillifera Walker, 1866; Acidalia magniferaria Walker, 1861; Acidalia ossulata Packard, 1876; Acidalia repletaria Walker, 1866; Acidalia sublataria Guenee, 1857; Acidalia temnaria Guenee, 1857

= Lobocleta ossularia =

Species of moth

Lobocleta ossularia, the drab brown wave moth, is a moth in the family Geometridae. It is found in North America, where it has been recorded from California to Florida, north in the east to New York and Illinois.

The wingspan is 13–19 mm. Adults are on wing from June to September in California.

The larvae feed on Stellaria media, Galium species and Fragaria chiloensis.
