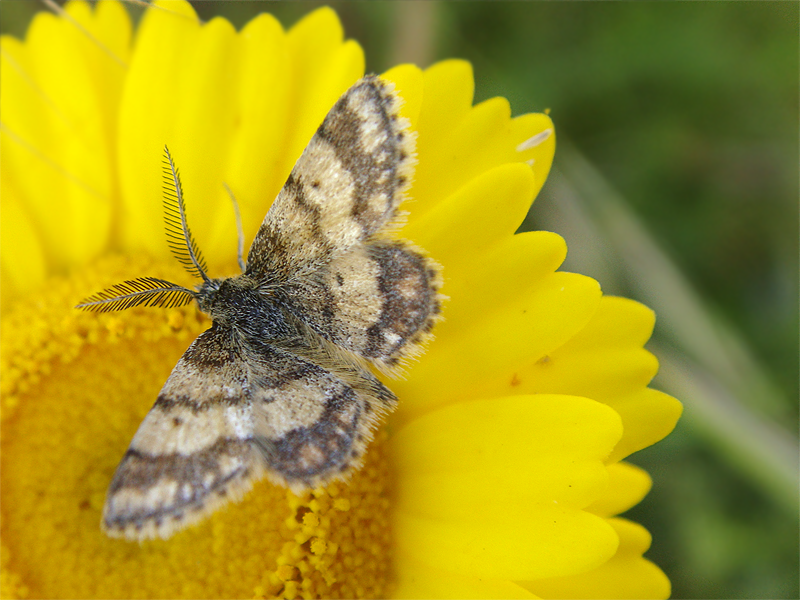

Scientific classification
- Kingdom: Animalia
- Phylum: Arthropoda
- Class: Insecta
- Order: Lepidoptera
- Family: Geometridae
- Genus: Cleta
- Species: C. ramosaria

Binomial name
- Cleta ramosaria (Villers, 1789)

Synonyms
- Phalaena ramosaria de Villers, 1789; Geometra vittaria Hubner, 1813

= Cleta ramosaria =

Species of moth

Cleta ramosaria is a moth of the family Geometridae first described by Charles Joseph Devillers in 1789. It is found on the Iberian Peninsula and North Africa.
