= Euacidalia brownsvillea =

Scientific classification
- Kingdom: Animalia
- Phylum: Arthropoda
- Clade: Pancrustacea
- Class: Insecta
- Order: Lepidoptera
- Family: Geometridae
- Genus: Euacidalia
- Species: E. brownsvillea

Binomial name
- Euacidalia brownsvillea Cassino, 1931

Species of moth

Euacidalia brownsvillea is a moth of the family Geometridae. It is found in North America, including Texas as well as Hawaii.
