= Euacidalia oroandes =

Scientific classification
- Kingdom: Animalia
- Phylum: Arthropoda
- Class: Insecta
- Order: Lepidoptera
- Family: Geometridae
- Genus: Euacidalia
- Species: E. oroandes

Binomial name
- Euacidalia oroandes (H. Druce, 1893)

Synonyms
- Eupithecia oroandes H. Druce, 1893

Species of moth

Euacidalia oroandes is a moth in the family Geometridae. It was described by Herbert Druce in 1893. It is found in Guatemala and Panama.

The wingspan is about 28 mm (1 1/10 in). The forewings and hindwings are pale pinkish-brown, becoming paler at the base.
