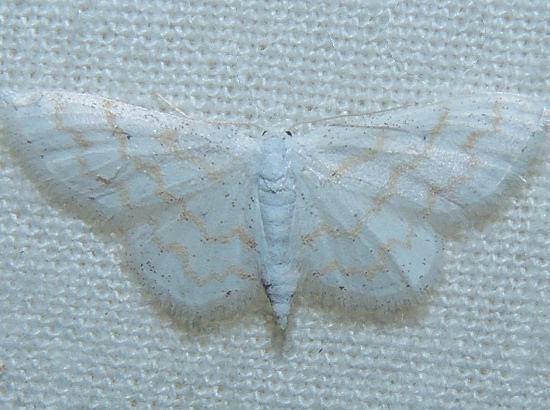
- Lobocleta peralbata

Scientific classification
- Kingdom: Animalia
- Phylum: Arthropoda
- Class: Insecta
- Order: Lepidoptera
- Family: Geometridae
- Subfamily: Sterrhinae
- Tribe: Sterrhini
- Genus: Lobocleta; Warren, 1906

Synonyms
- Metasiopsis Prout, 1910

= Lobocleta =

Genus of moths

Lobocleta is a genus of moths in the family Geometridae erected by Warren in 1906.

== Species ==
The genus includes the following species:

- Lobocleta borunta (Schaus, 1901)
- Lobocleta cocaria (Schaus, 1901)
- Lobocleta consumtata (Moschler, 1882)
- Lobocleta costalis (Dyar, 1910)
- Lobocleta cymiphora (Hampson, 1904)
- Lobocleta dativaria Schaus, 1940
- Lobocleta fara (Kirby, 1890)
- Lobocleta figurinata (Guenée, 1858)
- Lobocleta flavistigma (Warren, 1906)
- Lobocleta flexicosta (Warren, 1900)
- Lobocleta germana (Warren, 1900)
- Lobocleta gibbosa (Warren, 1900)
- Lobocleta granitaria (Packard, 1871)
- Lobocleta griseata (Cassino, 1931)
- Lobocleta griseolimbata Prout, 1922
- Lobocleta incarnata (Dognin, 1902)
- Lobocleta indecora (Warren, 1900)
- Lobocleta inermaria (Guenée, 1858)
- Lobocleta isocyma Prout, 1932
- Lobocleta jamaicensis (Warren, 1897)
- Lobocleta lanceolata (Hulst, 1896)
- Lobocleta malepicta (Warren, 1905)
- Lobocleta malvina (Schaus, 1901)
- Lobocleta maricaria Schaus, 1940
- Lobocleta martinicensis Herbulot, 1985
- Lobocleta minuscula (Thierry-Mieg, 1892)
- Lobocleta monogrammata (Guenée, 1858)
- Lobocleta muscilineata (Dognin, 1906)
- Lobocleta mutuataria (Moschler, 1890)
- Lobocleta nataria (Walker, 1866)
- Lobocleta nelata (Guenée, 1858)
- Lobocleta nymphidiata (Guenée, 1858)
- Lobocleta obliquaria (Warren, 1900)
- Lobocleta offendata (Moschler, 1890)
- Lobocleta oretilia (Druce, 1893)
- Lobocleta ossularia (Geyer, 1837)
- Lobocleta panerema (Dyar, 1916)
- Lobocleta pedissequa (Warren, 1900)
- Lobocleta peralbata (Packard, 1873)
- Lobocleta perditaria (Walker, 1866)
- Lobocleta plemyraria (Guenée, 1857)
- Lobocleta porphyrinata (Walker, 1863)
- Lobocleta proutaria (E. D. Jones, 1921)
- Lobocleta quaesitata (Hulst, 1880)
- Lobocleta sencilla (Dognin, 1901)
- Lobocleta spoliataria (Guenée, 1858)
- Lobocleta subcincta (Dognin, 1901)
- Lobocleta taeniolata (Warren, 1904)
- Lobocleta tenellata (Moschler, 1886)
- Lobocleta triangularis (Warren, 1897)
- Lobocleta trichroa (Prout, 1918)
- Lobocleta tricuspida Herbulot, 1985
- Lobocleta unigravis Prout, 1920
- Lobocleta xenosceles Prout, 1920
