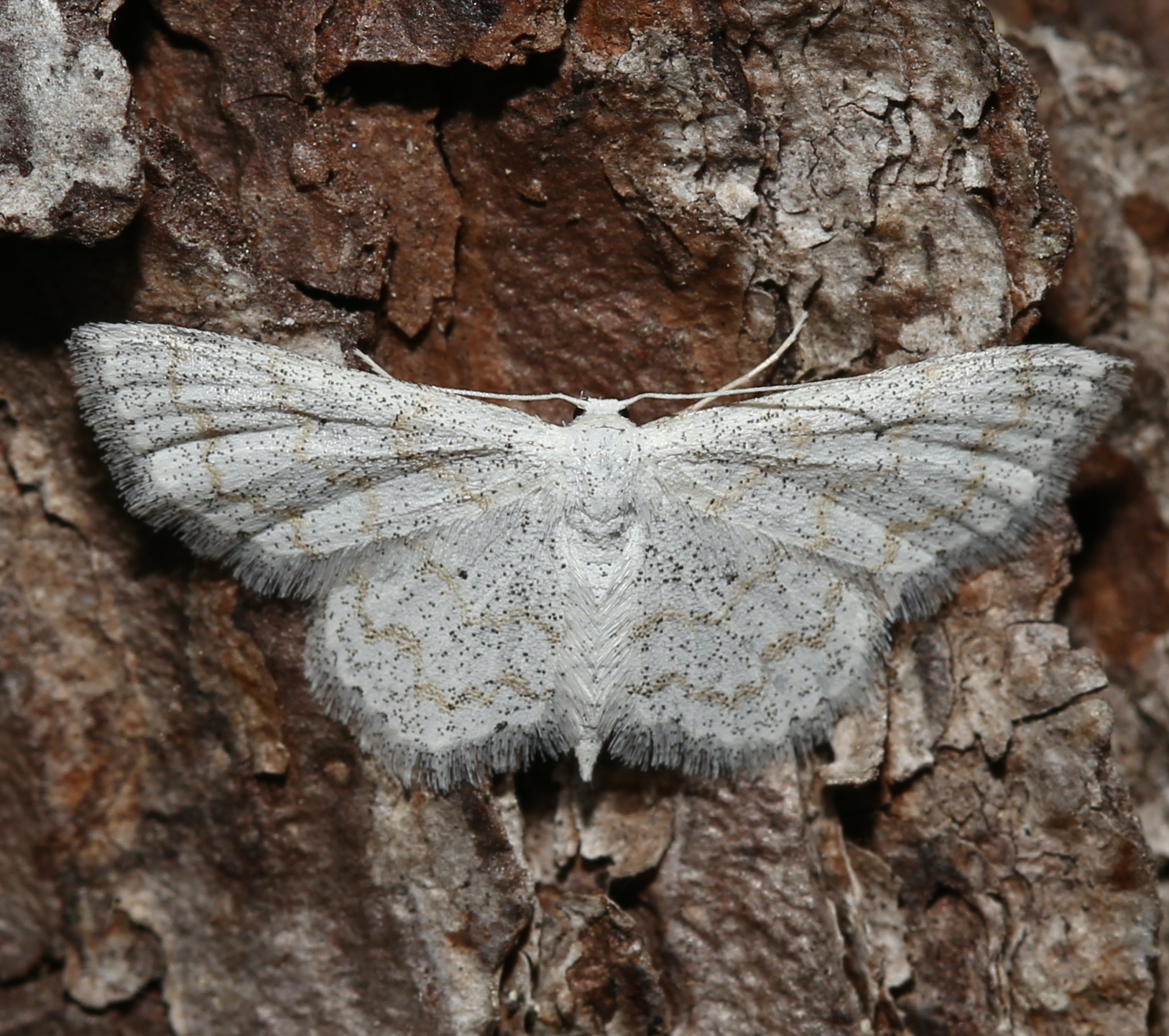

Scientific classification
- Kingdom: Animalia
- Phylum: Arthropoda
- Clade: Pancrustacea
- Class: Insecta
- Order: Lepidoptera
- Family: Geometridae
- Genus: Lobocleta
- Species: L. peralbata

Binomial name
- Lobocleta peralbata (Packard, 1873)

Synonyms
- Acidalia peralbata Packard, 1873; Idaea peralbata; Acidalia longipennata Packard, 1873

= Lobocleta peralbata =

Species of moth

Lobocleta peralbata is a moth in the family Geometridae. It is found in North America, where it has been recorded from Arizona to Florida, north to North Carolina.

The wingspan is 11–20 mm. Adults are on wing from December to September.
