= Eueupithecia =

Scientific classification
- Kingdom: Animalia
- Phylum: Arthropoda
- Class: Insecta
- Order: Lepidoptera
- Family: Geometridae
- Tribe: Sterrhini
- Genus: Eueupithecia

Genus of moths

Eueupithecia is a genus of moths in the family Geometridae.
