= Anthometra =

Scientific classification
- Kingdom: Animalia
- Phylum: Arthropoda
- Class: Insecta
- Order: Lepidoptera
- Family: Geometridae
- Tribe: Sterrhini
- Genus: Anthometra; Boisduval, 1840
- Species: A. plumularia

Binomial name
- Anthometra plumularia (Boisduval, 1840)

Monotypic genus of geometer moths

Anthometra is a monotypic moth genus in the family Geometridae. Its only species, Anthometra plumularia, is found in southwestern Europe. Both the genus and species were first described by Jean Baptiste Boisduval in 1840.
