= Brachyglossina =

Scientific classification
- Kingdom: Animalia
- Phylum: Arthropoda
- Class: Insecta
- Order: Lepidoptera
- Family: Geometridae
- Tribe: Sterrhini
- Genus: Brachyglossina; Wagner, 1914

Genus of moths

Brachyglossina is a genus of moths in the family Geometridae.

== Species ==
- Brachyglossina chaspia Brandt, 1938
- Brachyglossina hispanaria
