= Euacidalia =

Scientific classification
- Kingdom: Animalia
- Phylum: Arthropoda
- Clade: Pancrustacea
- Class: Insecta
- Order: Lepidoptera
- Family: Geometridae
- Tribe: Sterrhini
- Genus: Euacidalia; Packard, 1873

Synonyms
- Obelopteryx Warren, 1906

Genus of moths

Euacidalia is a genus of moths in the family Geometridae described by Packard in 1873.

== Species ==
- Euacidalia angusta (Warren, 1906)
- Euacidalia brownsvillea Cassino, 1931
- Euacidalia certissa (Druce, 1893)
- Euacidalia externata (Walker, 1863)
- Euacidalia nigridaria Cassino, 1931
- Euacidalia nitipennis Dyar, 1916
- Euacidalia orbelia (Druce, 1893)
- Euacidalia oroandes (Druce, 1893)
- Euacidalia puerta Cassino, 1931
- Euacidalia quakerata Cassino, 1931
- Euacidalia rosea (Warren, 1897)
- Euacidalia sericearia Packard, 1873
