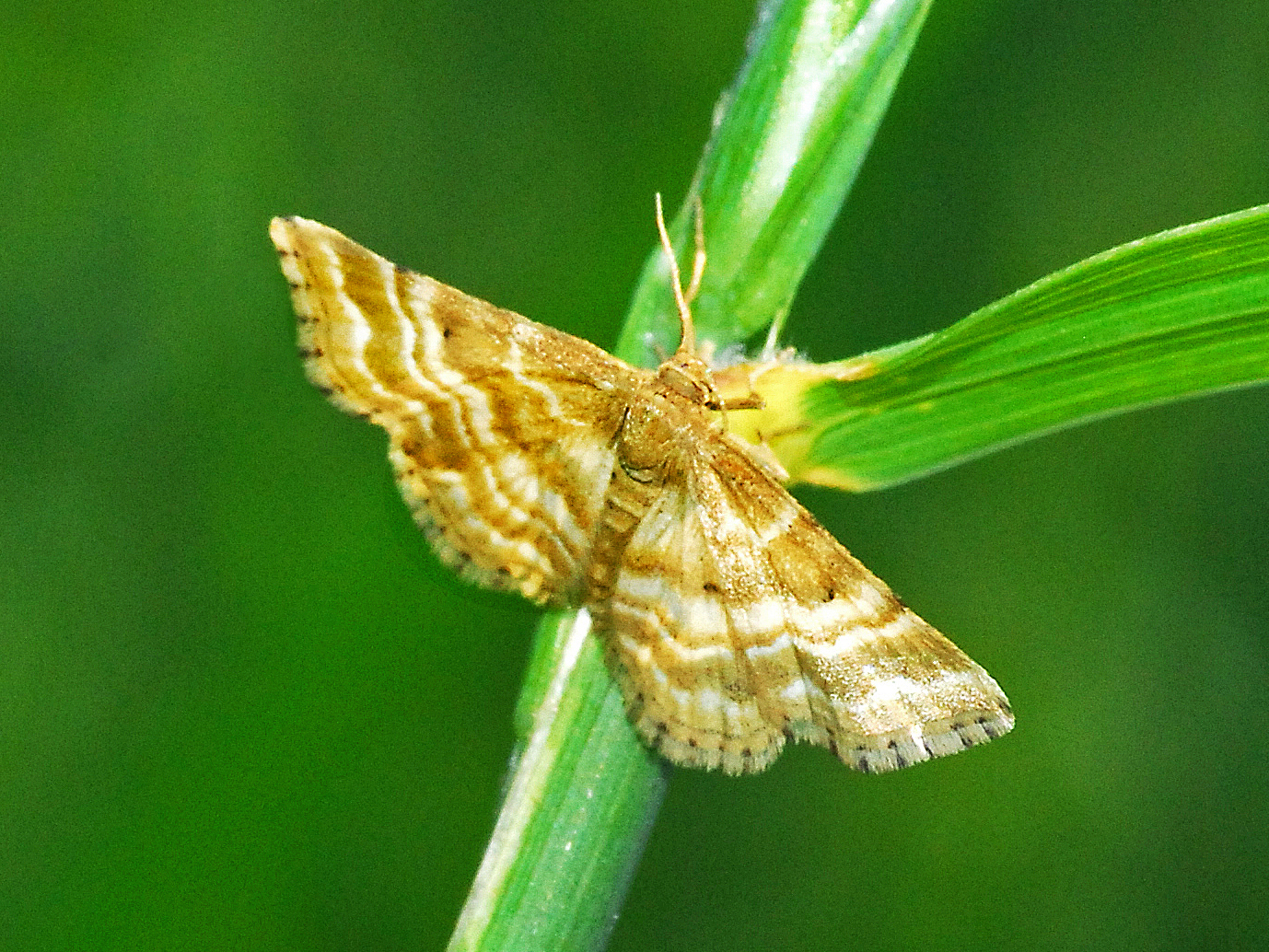
- Emmiltis pygmaearia. Female
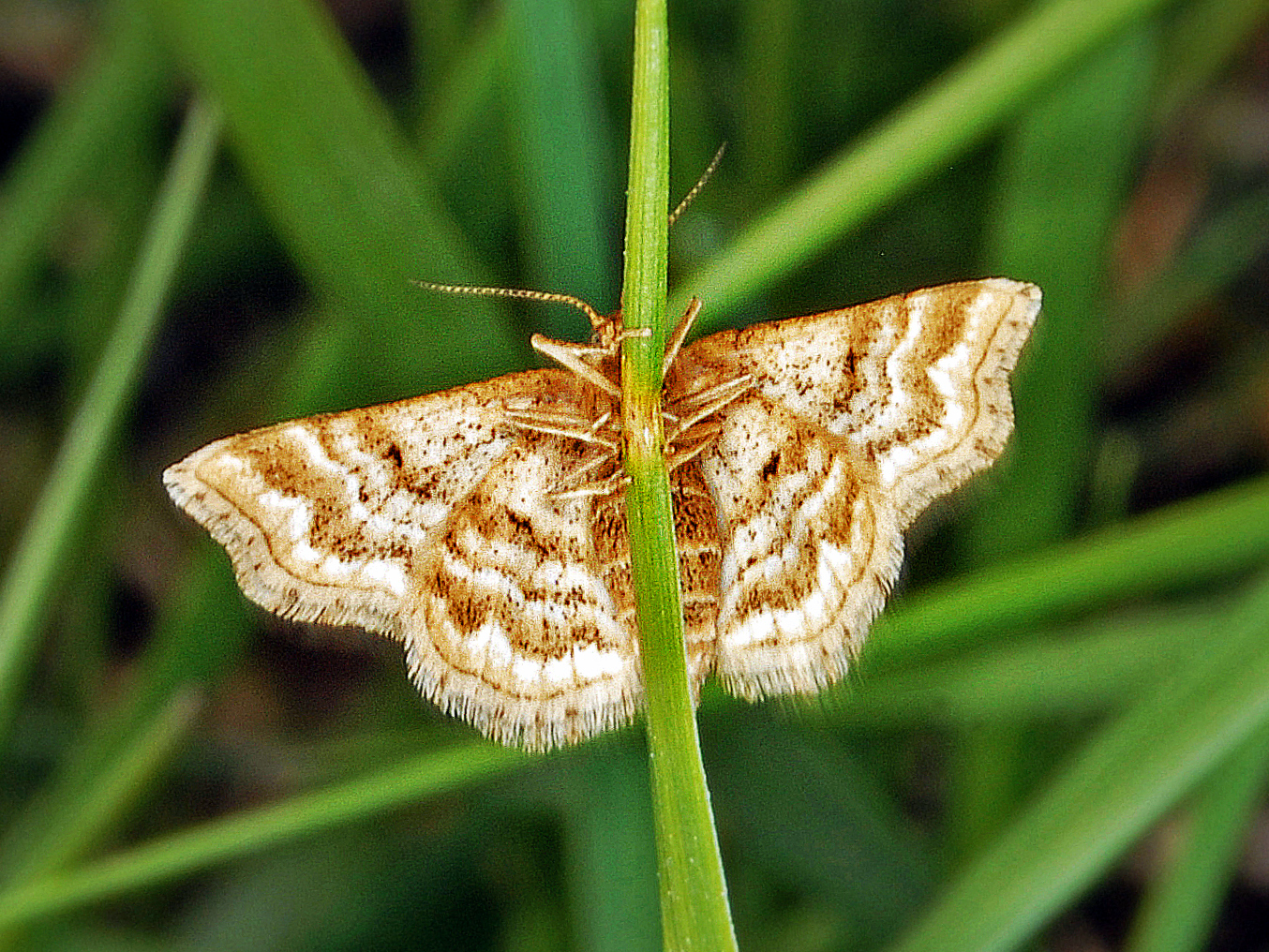
- Underside

Scientific classification
- Kingdom: Animalia
- Phylum: Arthropoda
- Clade: Pancrustacea
- Class: Insecta
- Order: Lepidoptera
- Family: Geometridae
- Tribe: Sterrhini
- Genus: Emmiltis; Hübner, 1825
- Species: E. pygmaearia

Binomial name
- Emmiltis pygmaearia (Hübner, 1809)

= Emmiltis =

Genus of moths

Emmiltis is a monotypic moth genus in the family Geometridae. Its only species is Emmiltis pygmaearia. Both the genus and species were first described by Jacob Hübner, the genus in 1825 and the species in 1809.

== Etymology ==
The species name pygmaearia comes from the Latin pygmaeus meaning dwarf, because it is one of the smallest species.

== Distribution and habitat ==
Emmiltis pygmaearia is present in southeastern Europe (Croatia, France, Italy, Slovenia and Switzerland). This xerothermophil species mainly occurs in dry, grassy, low-growing areas on stony ground, at an elevation up to 800 metres (2,600 ft) above sea level.

== Description ==
Emmiltis pygmaearia can reach a wingspan of about 22 mm (0.87 in). The basic color of these uncommon small moths varies from light brown to ocher, The forewings and the hindwings are crossed by three whitish wavy lines, with a darker border. Along the fringed checkered edge of the wings runs a thin line of brown. In this species the sexes are dimorphic. In fact in the males only the antennae are comb-like and it is much more evident the brown area near the internal corner of the rear wings.

== Biology ==
This species has two generations a year (bivoltine). Adults are active during the day in May–June and in July–August. In Summer caterpillars feed on flowers of lower plants (mainly Fabaceae and Caryophyllaceae) (Cerastium tomentosum, Lotus corniculatus, Ononis spinosa, Stellaria holostea, Stellaria media, Taraxacum officinale). From autumn they hibernate on dry leaves of the host plants and after overwintering they live on the withered leaves.

== Bibliography ==
- Hübner, J. [1790-1833]: Sammlung europäischer Schmetterlinge 5: pl. 1-113.
