= Epicleta =

Scientific classification
- Kingdom: Animalia
- Phylum: Arthropoda
- Clade: Pancrustacea
- Class: Insecta
- Order: Lepidoptera
- Family: Geometridae
- Tribe: Sterrhini
- Genus: Epicleta; L. B. Prout, 1915
- Species: E. calidaria

Binomial name
- Epicleta calidaria L. B. Prout, 1915

Genus of moths

Epicleta is a monotypic moth genus in the family Geometridae. Its single species, Epicleta calidaria, is found in the Eastern Cape of South Africa. Both the genus and species were first described by Louis Beethoven Prout in 1915.
