= Protoproutia =

Scientific classification
- Kingdom: Animalia
- Phylum: Arthropoda
- Class: Insecta
- Order: Lepidoptera
- Family: Geometridae
- Tribe: Sterrhini
- Genus: Protoproutia; McDunnough, 1939

Genus of moths

Protoproutia is a genus of moths in the family Geometridae erected by James Halliday McDunnough in 1939.

== Species ==
- Protoproutia rusticaria McDunnough, 1939
- Protoproutia laredoata (Cassino, 1931)
