= Arcobara (moth) =

Scientific classification
- Kingdom: Animalia
- Phylum: Arthropoda
- Class: Insecta
- Order: Lepidoptera
- Family: Geometridae
- Tribe: Sterrhini
- Genus: Arcobara; Walker, 1863

Genus of moths

Arcobara is a genus of moths in the family Geometridae erected by Francis Walker in 1863.

== Species ==
- Arcobara flexistrigata (Warren, 1900)
- Arcobara multilineata (Hulst, 1887)
- Arcobara perlineata (Schaus, 1913)
- Arcobara tergeminaria (Herrich-Schäffer, [1855])
