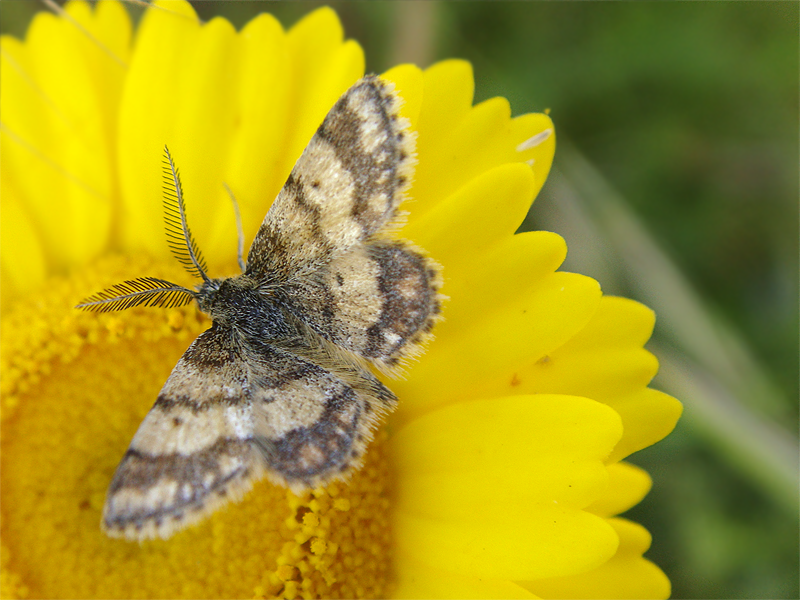
- Cleta ramosaria

Scientific classification
- Kingdom: Animalia
- Phylum: Arthropoda
- Class: Insecta
- Order: Lepidoptera
- Family: Geometridae
- Tribe: Sterrhini
- Genus: Cleta; Duponchel, 1845

= Cleta (moth) =

Genus of moths

Cleta is a genus of moth in the family Geometridae.

== Species ==
- Cleta filacearia (Herrich-Schäffer, 1847)
- Cleta jacutica (Viidalepp, 1976)
- Cleta perpusillaria (Eversmann, 1847)
- Cleta ramosaria (Villers, 1789)
