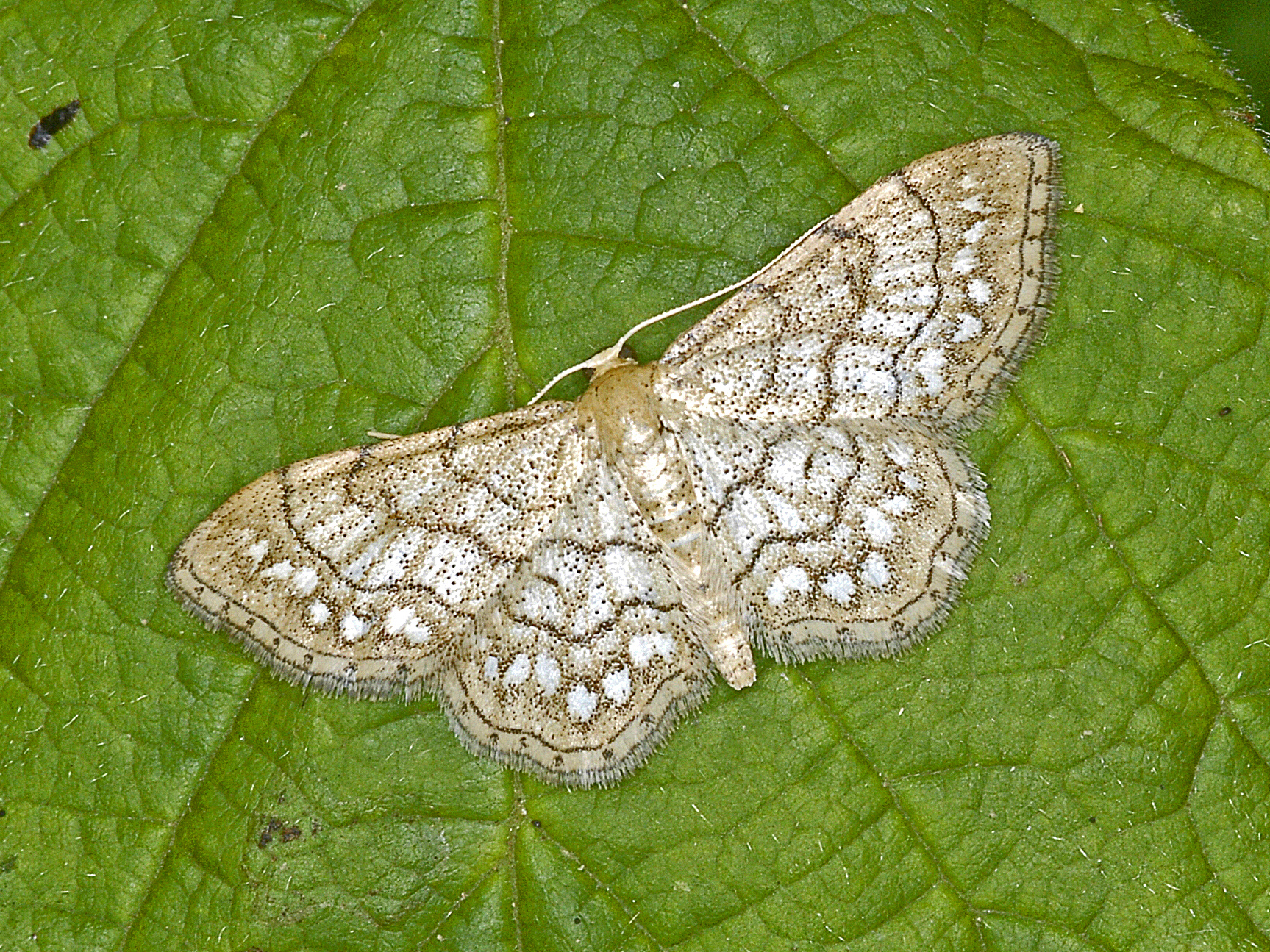
- Idaea moniliata

Scientific classification
- Kingdom: Animalia
- Phylum: Arthropoda
- Clade: Pancrustacea
- Class: Insecta
- Order: Lepidoptera
- Family: Geometridae
- Subfamily: Sterrhinae
- Tribe: Sterrhini; Meyrick, 1892

Synonyms
- Idaeini Butler, 1881

= Sterrhini =

Tribe of moths

Sterrhini is a tribe of the geometer moth family (Geometridae), with about 825 species in 19 genera. There are also 6 genera with 36 species tentatively associated with the tribe. The tribe was erected by Edward Meyrick in 1892.

== Genera ==
- Anthometra Boisduval, 1840
- Arcobara Walker, 1863
- Brachyglossina Wagner, 1914
- Cleta Duponchel, 1845
- Emmiltis Hübner, 1825
- Epicleta Prout, 1915
- Euacidalia Packard, 1873
- Eueupithecia Prout, 1910
- Eumacrodes Warren, 1905
- Eupithecidia Hampson, 1895
- Idaea Treitschke, 1825
- Lobocleta Warren, 1906
- Odontoptila Warren, 1897
- Paota Hulst, 1896
- Protoproutia McDunnough, 1939
- Ptychamalia Prout, 1932
- Tineigidia Sterneck, 1934

== Uncertain association ==
- Aphanophleps Warren, 1906
- Limeria Staudinger, 1892
- Lophophleps Hampson, 1891
- Lycaugidia Hampson, 1895
- Notiosterrha Prout, 1932
- Stenorrhoe Warren, 1900
- Tricentrogyna Prout, 1932
- Trichosterrha Warren, 1904
