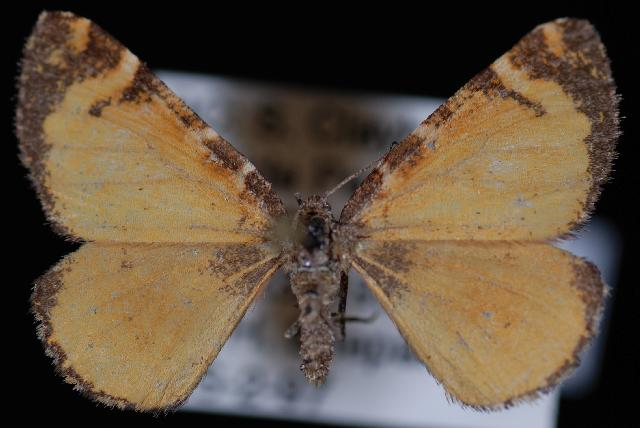

Scientific classification
- Domain: Eukaryota
- Kingdom: Animalia
- Phylum: Arthropoda
- Class: Insecta
- Order: Lepidoptera
- Family: Geometridae
- Tribe: Stamnodini
- Genus: Stamnodes
- Species: S. topazata

Binomial name
- Stamnodes topazata (Strecker, 1899)

= Stamnodes topazata =

Species of moth

Stamnodes topazata is a species of geometrid moth in the family Geometridae. It is found in North America.

The MONA or Hodges number for Stamnodes topazata is 7349.

== Subspecies ==
These four subspecies belong to the species Stamnodes topazata:

- Stamnodes topazata albida Barnes & McDunnough, 1912
- Stamnodes topazata apicata Barnes & McDunnough
- Stamnodes topazata arctica Thierry-Mieg, 1911
- Stamnodes topazata topazata
