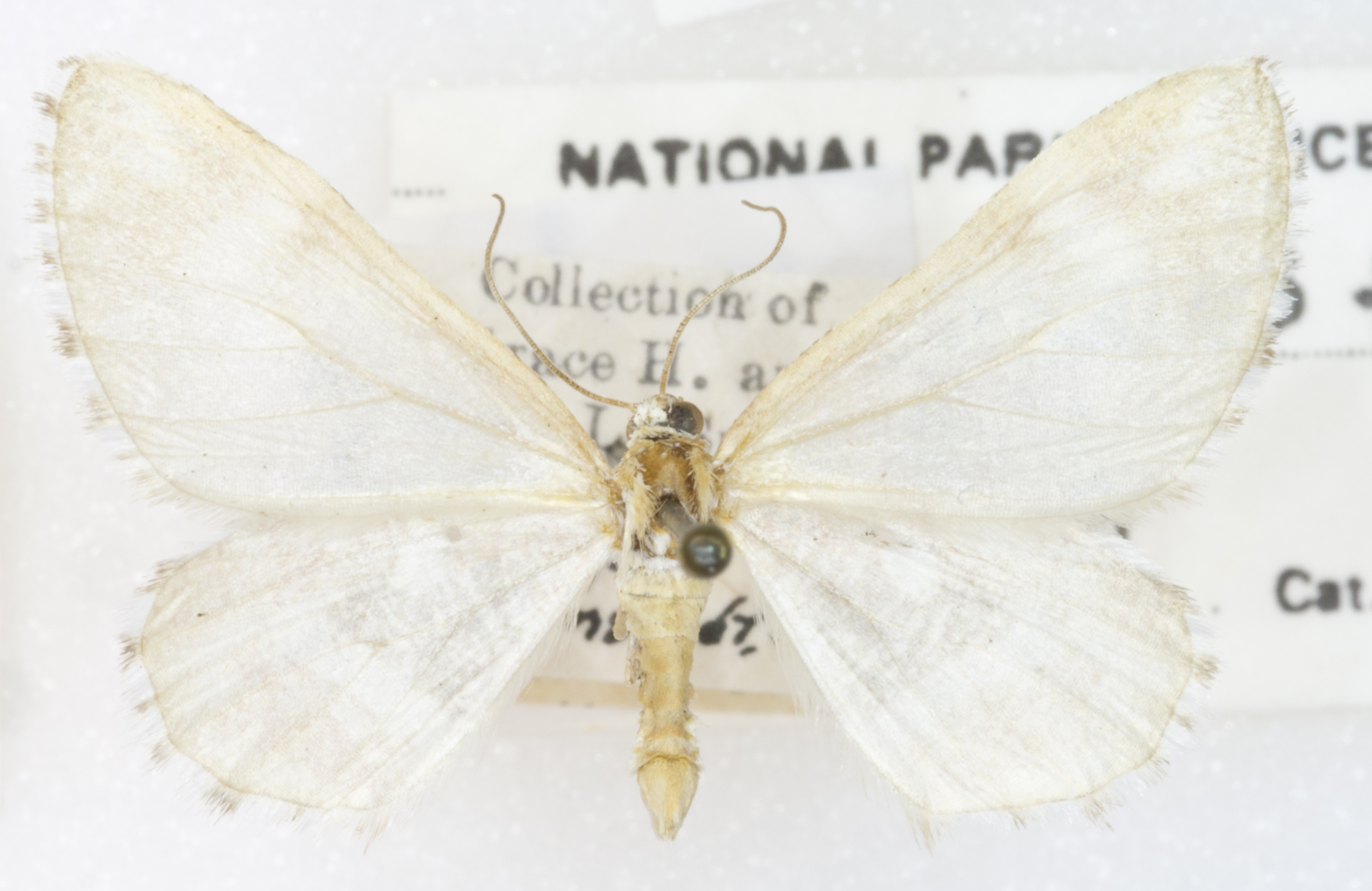

Scientific classification
- Domain: Eukaryota
- Kingdom: Animalia
- Phylum: Arthropoda
- Class: Insecta
- Order: Lepidoptera
- Family: Geometridae
- Tribe: Stamnodini
- Genus: Stamnodes
- Species: S. formosata

Binomial name
- Stamnodes formosata (Strecker in Ruffner, 1878)

= Stamnodes formosata =

Species of moth

Stamnodes formosata is a species of geometrid moth in the family Geometridae. It is found in North America.

The MONA or Hodges number for Stamnodes formosata is 7347.
