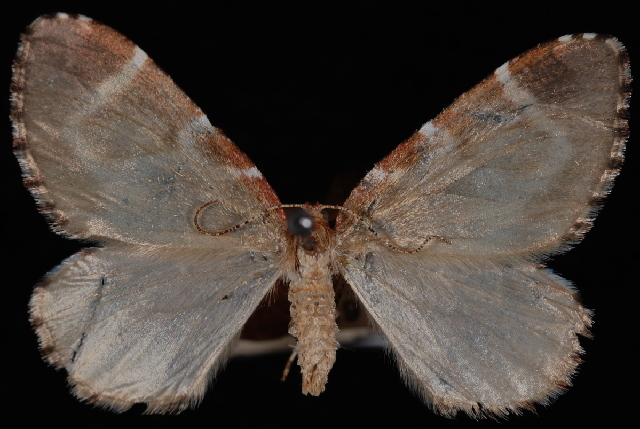

Scientific classification
- Domain: Eukaryota
- Kingdom: Animalia
- Phylum: Arthropoda
- Class: Insecta
- Order: Lepidoptera
- Family: Geometridae
- Tribe: Stamnodini
- Genus: Stamnodes
- Species: S. blackmorei

Binomial name
- Stamnodes blackmorei Swett, 1915

= Stamnodes blackmorei =

Species of moth

Stamnodes blackmorei is a species of geometrid moth in the family Geometridae. It is found in North America.
