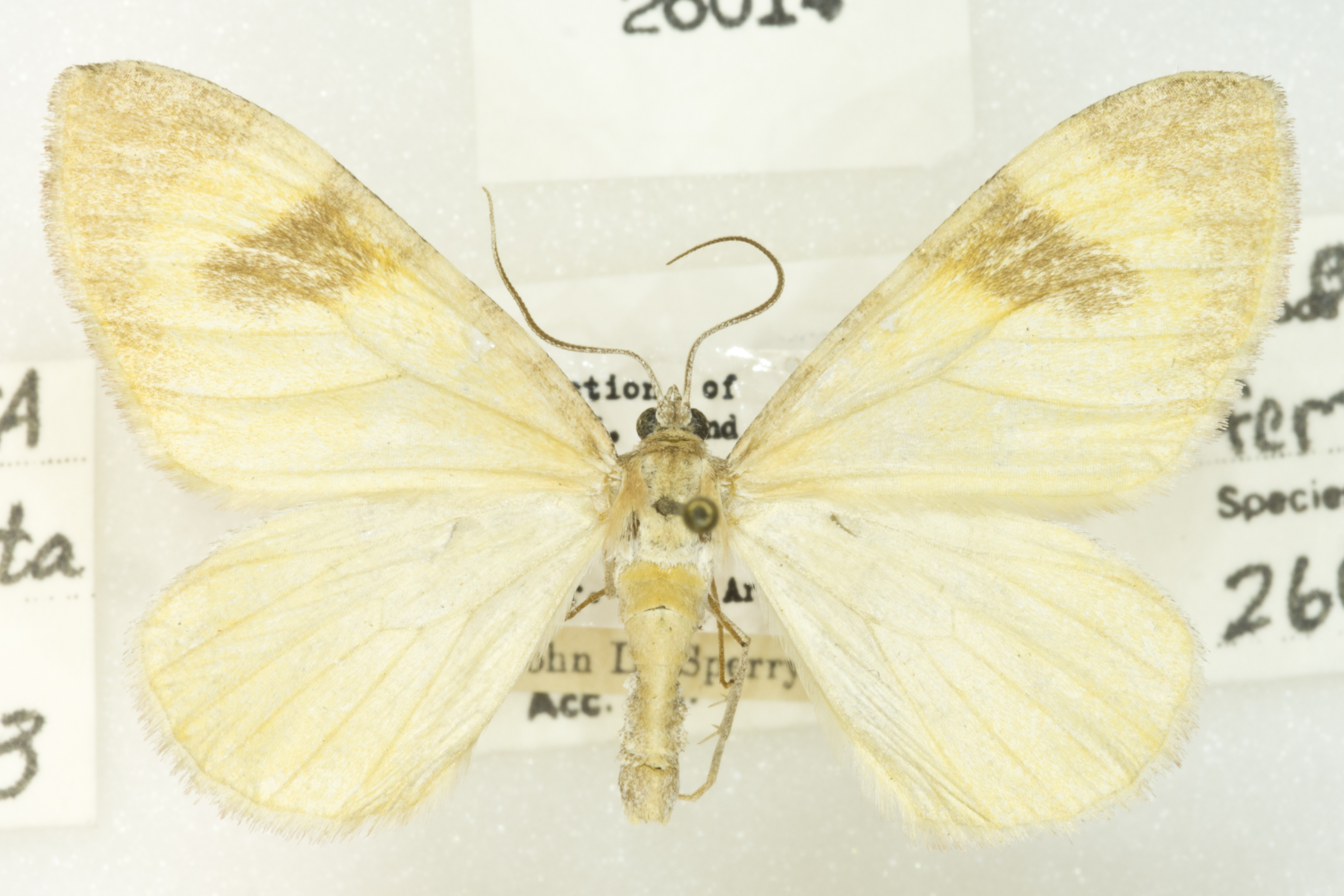

Scientific classification
- Domain: Eukaryota
- Kingdom: Animalia
- Phylum: Arthropoda
- Class: Insecta
- Order: Lepidoptera
- Family: Geometridae
- Tribe: Stamnodini
- Genus: Stamnodes
- Species: S. seiferti

Binomial name
- Stamnodes seiferti (Neumoegen, 1882)

= Stamnodes seiferti =

Species of moth

Stamnodes seiferti is a species of geometrid moth in the family Geometridae. It is found in North America.

The MONA or Hodges number for Stamnodes seiferti is 7353.
