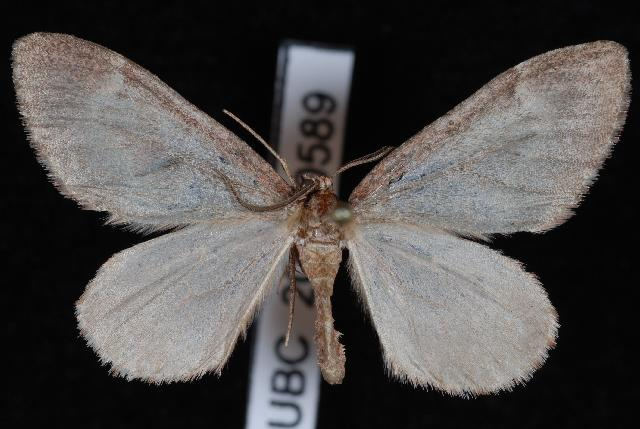

Scientific classification
- Domain: Eukaryota
- Kingdom: Animalia
- Phylum: Arthropoda
- Class: Insecta
- Order: Lepidoptera
- Family: Geometridae
- Tribe: Stamnodini
- Genus: Stamnoctenis
- Species: S. pearsalli

Binomial name
- Stamnoctenis pearsalli Swett, 1914

= Stamnoctenis pearsalli =

Species of moth

Stamnoctenis pearsalli is a species of geometrid moth in the family Geometridae. It is found in North America.

The MONA or Hodges number for Stamnoctenis pearsalli is 7357. They tend to keep their wings up when landed, where they can be recognized by the line visible on the lower part of their wing.
