= Stamnodes reckseckeri =

Scientific classification
- Domain: Eukaryota
- Kingdom: Animalia
- Phylum: Arthropoda
- Class: Insecta
- Order: Lepidoptera
- Family: Geometridae
- Tribe: Stamnodini
- Genus: Stamnodes
- Species: S. reckseckeri

Binomial name
- Stamnodes reckseckeri Pearsall, 1910

Species of moth

Stamnodes reckseckeri is a species of geometrid moth in the family Geometridae. It is found in North America.

The MONA or Hodges number for Stamnodes reckseckeri is 7336.
