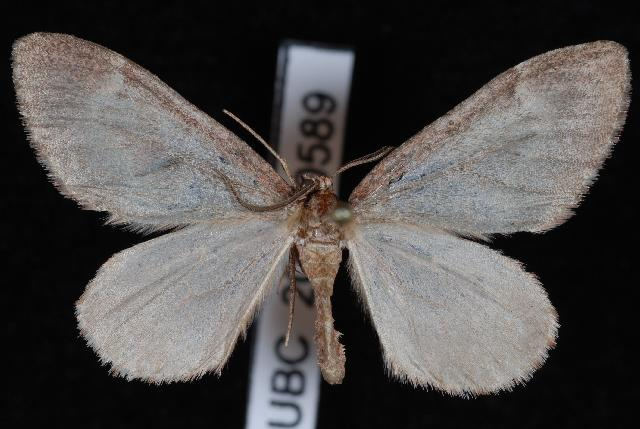
- Stamnoctenis pearsalli

Scientific classification
- Kingdom: Animalia
- Phylum: Arthropoda
- Class: Insecta
- Order: Lepidoptera
- Family: Geometridae
- Subfamily: Larentiinae
- Tribe: Stamnodini
- Genus: Stamnoctenis; Warren, 1901

= Stamnoctenis =

Genus of moths

Stamnoctenis is a genus of moths in the family Geometridae first described by Warren in 1901.

== Species ==
- Stamnoctenis costimacula (Grossbeck, 1912)
- Stamnoctenis morrisata (Hulst, 1887)
- Stamnoctenis pearsalli (Swett, 1914)
- Stamnoctenis rubrosuffusa (Grossbeck, 1912)
- Stamnoctenis similis (W. S. Wright, 1927)
- Stamnoctenis ululata (Pearsall, 1912)
- Stamnoctenis vernon Guedet, 1939
