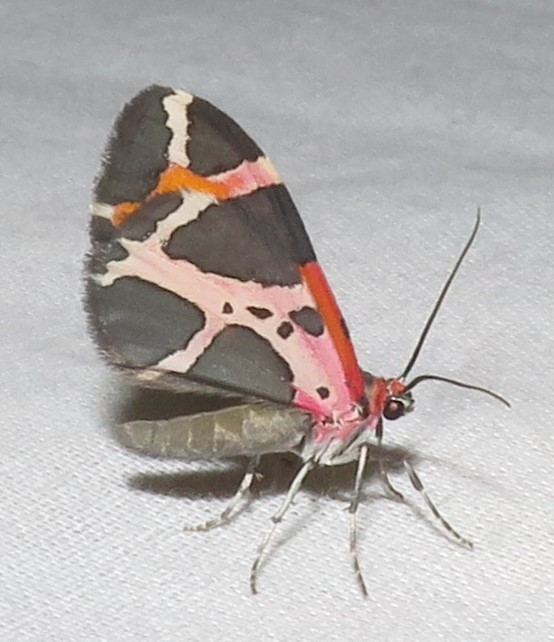

Scientific classification
- Kingdom: Animalia
- Phylum: Arthropoda
- Class: Insecta
- Order: Lepidoptera
- Family: Geometridae
- Genus: Stamnodes
- Species: S. fervefactaria

Binomial name
- Stamnodes fervefactaria (Grote, 1881)

= Stamnodes fervefactaria =

Species of moth

Stamnodes fervefactaria is a species of geometrid moth in the family Geometridae. It is found in North America.
