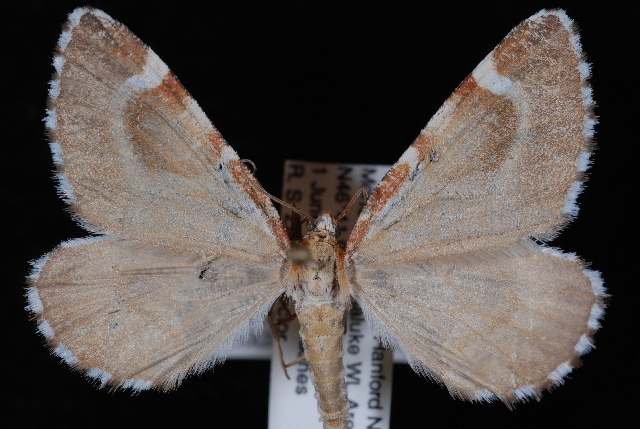

Scientific classification
- Kingdom: Animalia
- Phylum: Arthropoda
- Clade: Pancrustacea
- Class: Insecta
- Order: Lepidoptera
- Family: Geometridae
- Genus: Stamnodes
- Species: S. marmorata

Binomial name
- Stamnodes marmorata (Packard, 1871)

= Stamnodes marmorata =

Species of moth

Stamnodes marmorata is a species of geometrid moth in the family Geometridae. It is found in North America.

The MONA or Hodges number for Stamnodes marmorata is 7363.

== Subspecies ==
These two subspecies belong to the species Stamnodes marmorata:

- Stamnodes marmorata marmorata
- Stamnodes marmorata odontata Hulst, 1896
