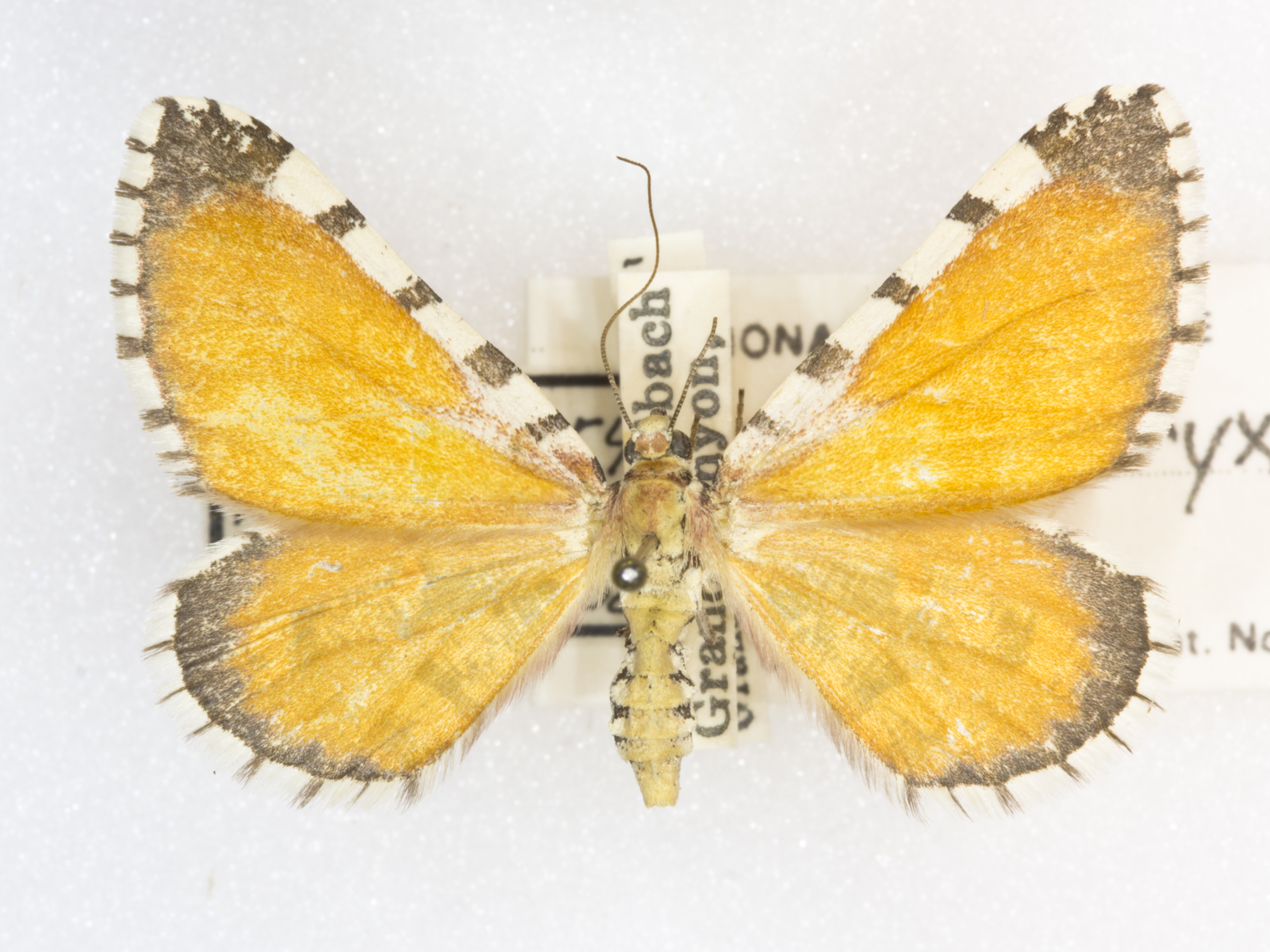

Scientific classification
- Kingdom: Animalia
- Phylum: Arthropoda
- Clade: Pancrustacea
- Class: Insecta
- Order: Lepidoptera
- Family: Geometridae
- Genus: Stamnodes
- Species: S. tessellata

Binomial name
- Stamnodes tessellata (Packard, 1874)

= Stamnodes tessellata =

Species of geometrid moth from North America

Stamnodes tessellata is a species of geometrid moth in the family Geometridae. It is found in North America.
