= Stamnodes deceptiva =

Scientific classification
- Domain: Eukaryota
- Kingdom: Animalia
- Phylum: Arthropoda
- Class: Insecta
- Order: Lepidoptera
- Family: Geometridae
- Genus: Stamnodes
- Species: S. deceptiva

Binomial name
- Stamnodes deceptiva Barnes & McDunnough, 1918

Species of moth

Stamnodes deceptiva is a species of moth in the family Geometridae first described by William Barnes and James Halliday McDunnough in 1918. It is found in North America.

The MONA or Hodges number for Stamnodes deceptiva is 7355.
