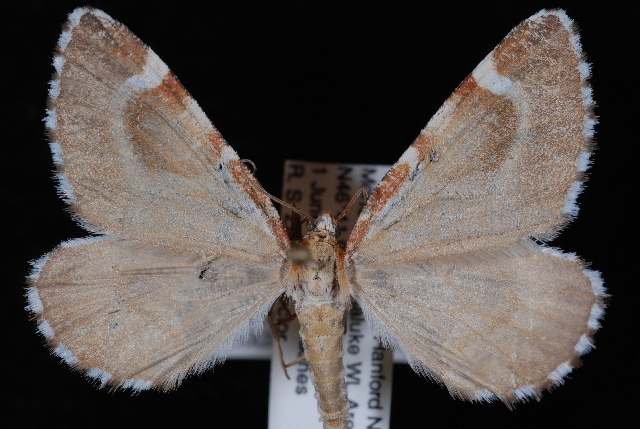
- Stamnodes marmorata

Scientific classification
- Kingdom: Animalia
- Phylum: Arthropoda
- Class: Insecta
- Order: Lepidoptera
- Family: Geometridae
- Subfamily: Larentiinae
- Tribe: Stamnodini
- Genus: Stamnodes; Guenée, [1858]

Synonyms
- Grammicopteryx Thierry-Mieg, 1904; Synneuria Mabille, 1885; Tora Walker, 1867

= Stamnodes =

Genus of moths

Stamnodes is a genus of moths in the family Geometridae first described by Achille Guenée in 1858.

== Species ==
- Stamnodes affiliata Pearsall, 1911
- Stamnodes albiapicata Grossbeck, 1910
- Stamnodes animata (Pearsall, 1906)
- Stamnodes annellata (Hulst, 1887)
- Stamnodes apollo Cassino, 1920
- Stamnodes artemis Rindge, 1958
- Stamnodes blackmorei Swett, 1915
- Stamnodes cassinoi Swett, 1917
- Stamnodes coenonymphata (Hulst, 1900)
- Stamnodes danilovi (Erschov, 1877)
- Stamnodes deceptiva Barnes & McDunnough, 1918
- Stamnodes delicata (Grossbeck, 1908)
- Stamnodes depeculata Lederer, 1870
- Stamnodes eldridgensis Swett, 1917
- Stamnodes fervefactaria (Grote, 1881)
- Stamnodes formosata (Strecker, 1878)
- Stamnodes franckata (Pearsall, 1909)
- Stamnodes gibbicostata (Walker, 1862)
- Stamnodes lampra Rindge, 1958
- Stamnodes marinata W. S. Wright, 1920
- Stamnodes marmorata Packard, 1871
- Stamnodes mendocinoensis Dyar, 1923
- Stamnodes modocata W. S. Wright, 1920
- Stamnodes pauperaria (Eversmann, 1848)
- Stamnodes reckseckeri Pearsall, 1910
- Stamnodes seiferti (Neumoegen, 1882)
- Stamnodes splendorata Pearsall, 1909
- Stamnodes tessellata (Packard, 1874)
- Stamnodes topazata (Strecker, 1899)
- Stamnodes triangularia (Bartlett-Calvert, 1891)
- Stamnodes ululata Pearsall, 1912
- Stamnodes uniformata (Berg, 1877)
- Stamnodes unilinea (Walker, 1867)
- Stamnodes watsoni (Cassino, 1920)
