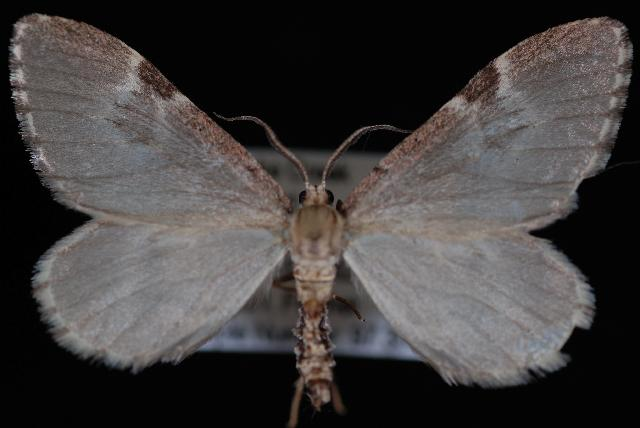

Scientific classification
- Kingdom: Animalia
- Phylum: Arthropoda
- Class: Insecta
- Order: Lepidoptera
- Family: Geometridae
- Genus: Stamnoctenis
- Species: S. morrisata

Binomial name
- Stamnoctenis morrisata (Hulst, 1887)

= Stamnoctenis morrisata =

Species of moth

Stamnoctenis morrisata is a species of geometrid moth in the family Geometridae.

The MONA or Hodges number for Stamnoctenis morrisata is 7356.
