= Stamnoctenis rubrosuffusa =

Scientific classification
- Domain: Eukaryota
- Kingdom: Animalia
- Phylum: Arthropoda
- Class: Insecta
- Order: Lepidoptera
- Family: Geometridae
- Genus: Stamnoctenis
- Species: S. rubrosuffusa

Binomial name
- Stamnoctenis rubrosuffusa (Grossbeck, 1912)

Species of moth

Stamnoctenis rubrosuffusa is a species of geometrid moth in the family Geometridae.

The MONA or Hodges number for Stamnoctenis rubrosuffusa is 7358.
