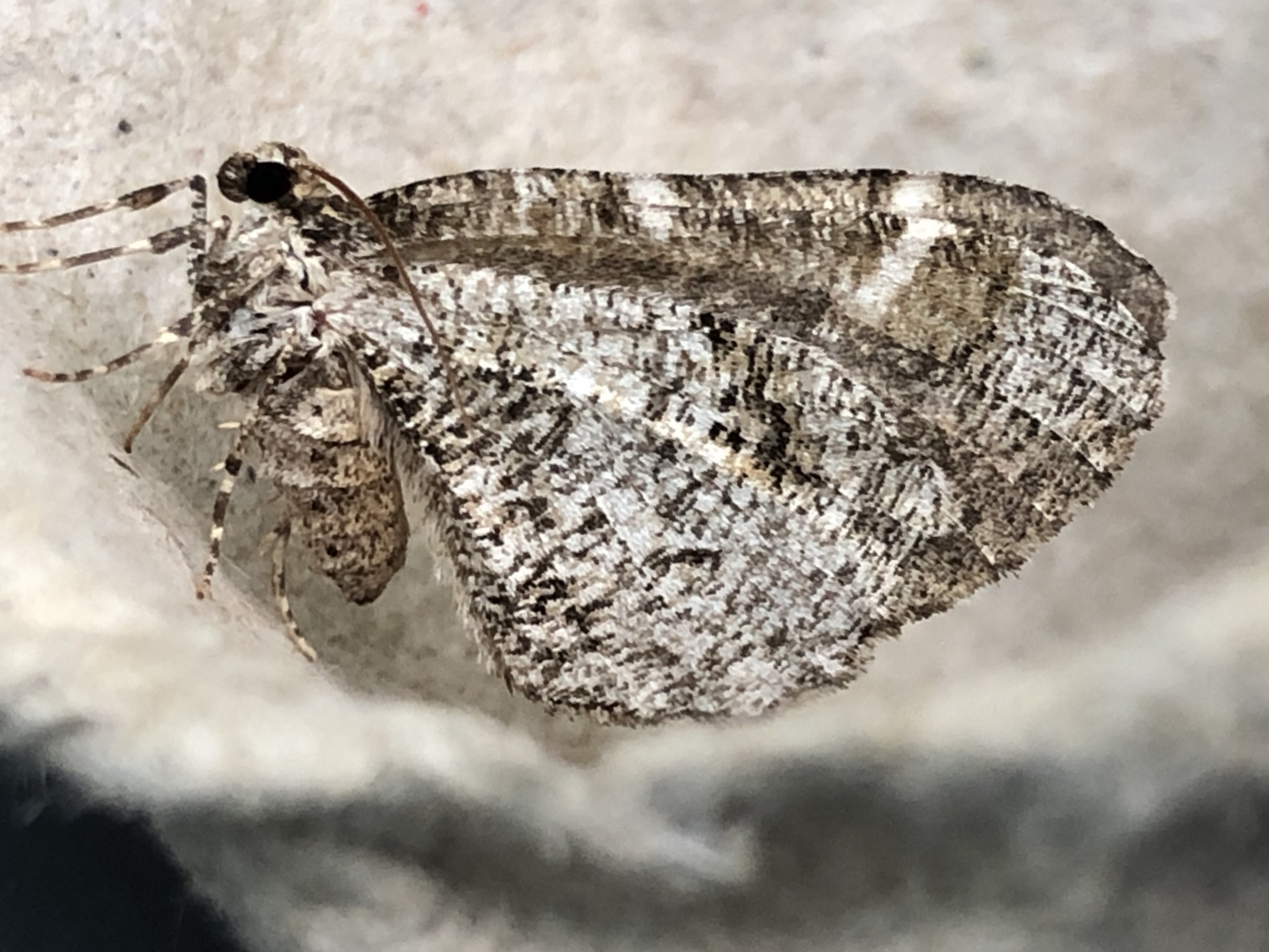

Scientific classification
- Kingdom: Animalia
- Phylum: Arthropoda
- Clade: Pancrustacea
- Class: Insecta
- Order: Lepidoptera
- Family: Geometridae
- Genus: Stamnodes
- Species: S. gibbicostata

Binomial name
- Stamnodes gibbicostata (Walker, 1862)

= Stamnodes gibbicostata =

Species of moth

Stamnodes gibbicostata, the shiny gray carpet moth, is a species of geometrid moth in the family Geometridae. It is found in North America.
