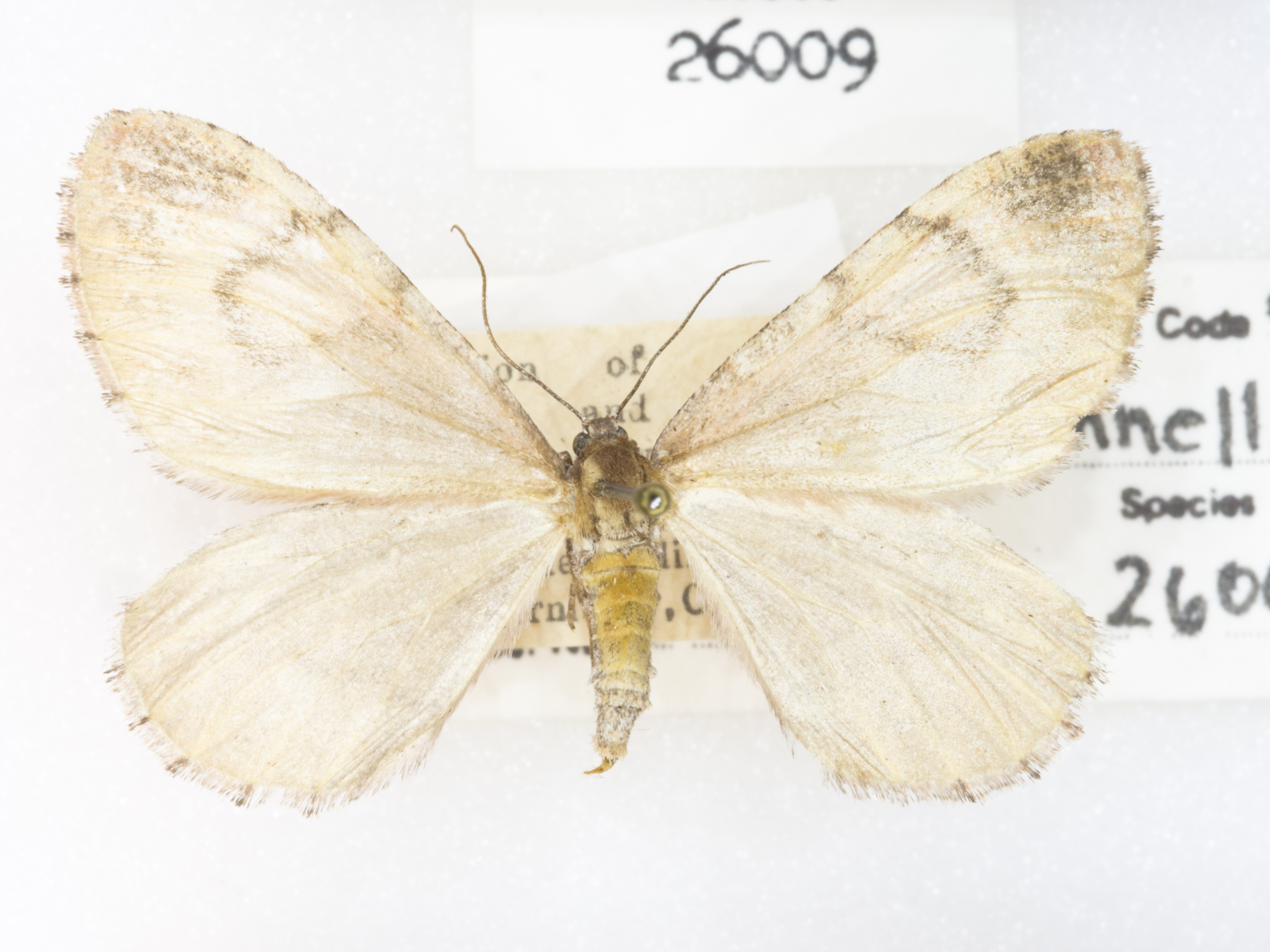
- Stamnodes annellata

Scientific classification
- Kingdom: Animalia
- Phylum: Arthropoda
- Clade: Pancrustacea
- Class: Insecta
- Order: Lepidoptera
- Family: Geometridae
- Subfamily: Larentiinae
- Tribe: Stamnodini; Forbes, 1948

= Stamnodini =

Tribe of moths

Stamnodini is a tribe of geometer moths in the subfamily Larentiinae.

== Genera ==
- Stamnoctenis Warren, 1901
- Stamnodes Guenée, [1858]
