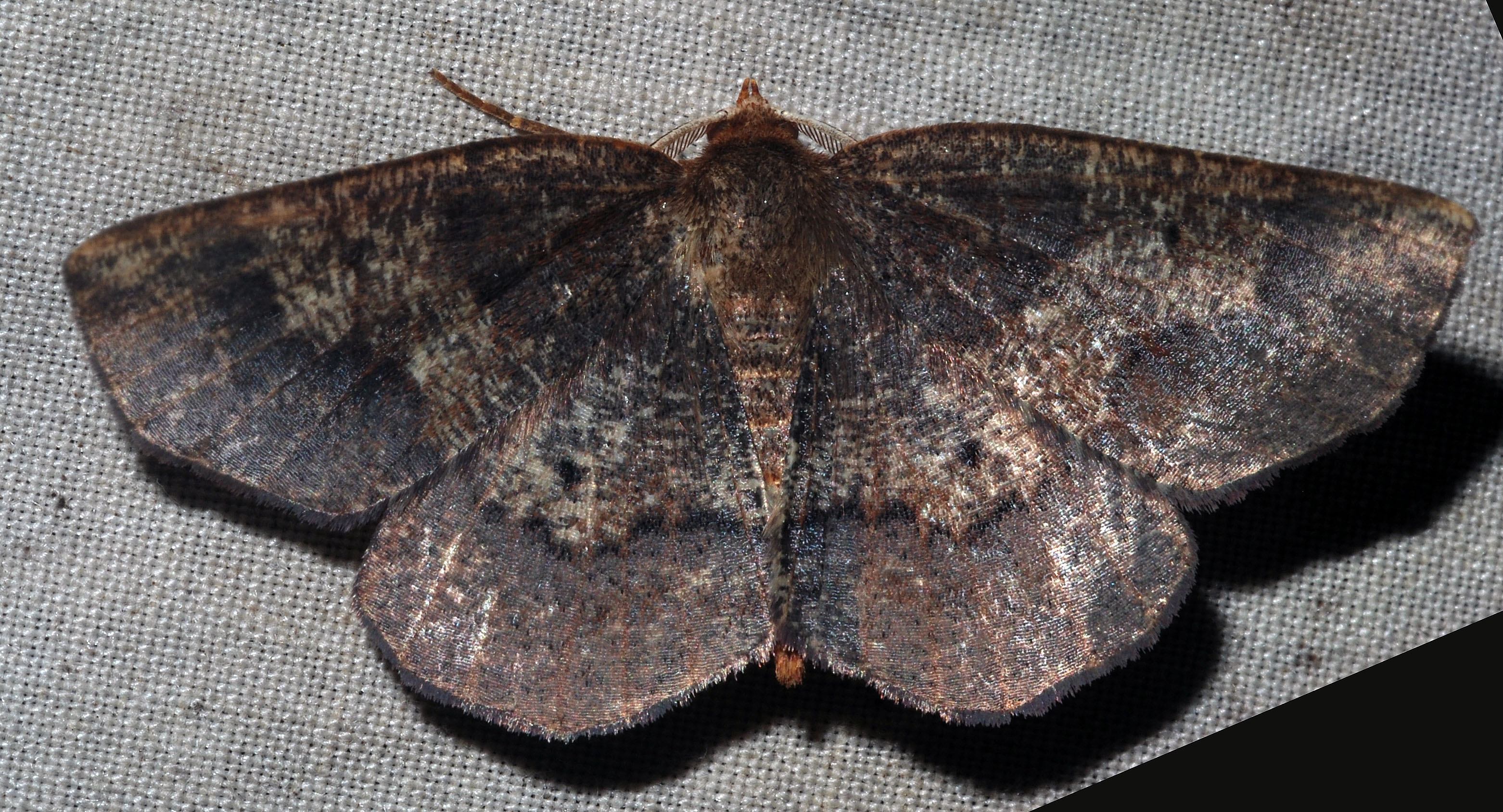

Scientific classification
- Domain: Eukaryota
- Kingdom: Animalia
- Phylum: Arthropoda
- Class: Insecta
- Order: Lepidoptera
- Family: Geometridae
- Genus: Metarranthis
- Species: M. angularia

Binomial name
- Metarranthis angularia Barnes & McDunnough, 1917

= Metarranthis angularia =

Species of moth

Metarranthis angularia, the angled metarranthis moth, is a species of moth in the family Geometridae. It was first described by William Barnes and James Halliday McDunnough in 1917 and it is found in North America.

The MONA or Hodges number for Metarranthis angularia is 6823.
