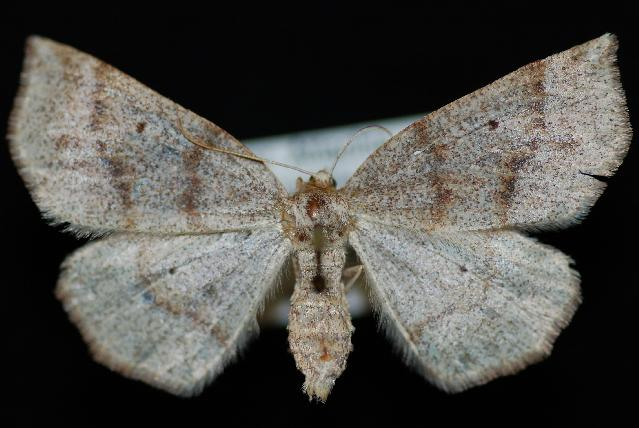

Scientific classification
- Kingdom: Animalia
- Phylum: Arthropoda
- Class: Insecta
- Order: Lepidoptera
- Family: Geometridae
- Subfamily: Ennominae
- Genus: Metarranthis
- Species: M. duaria

Binomial name
- Metarranthis duaria (Guenée in Boisduval & Guenée, 1858)

= Metarranthis duaria =

Species of moth

Metarranthis duaria, the ruddy metarranthis, is a species of geometrid moth in the family Geometridae. It is found in North America.

The MONA or Hodges number for Metarranthis duaria is 6822.
