= Metarranthis lateritiaria =

Scientific classification
- Kingdom: Animalia
- Phylum: Arthropoda
- Class: Insecta
- Order: Lepidoptera
- Family: Geometridae
- Subfamily: Ennominae
- Genus: Metarranthis
- Species: M. lateritiaria

Binomial name
- Metarranthis lateritiaria (Guenée in Boisduval & Guenée, 1858)

Species of moth

Metarranthis lateritiaria is a species of geometrid moth in the family Geometridae. It is found in North America.

The MONA or Hodges number for Metarranthis lateritiaria is 6829.
