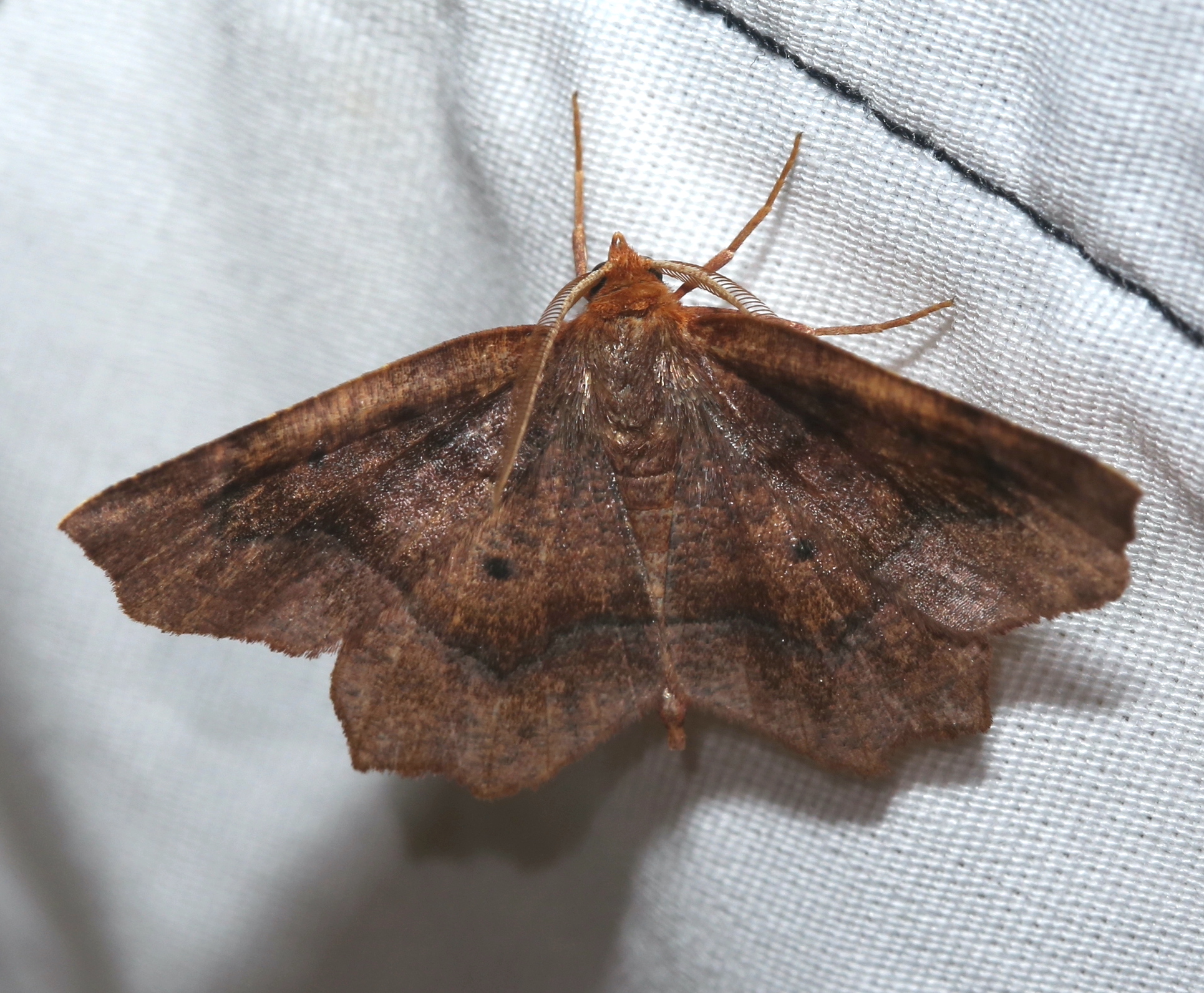

Scientific classification
- Kingdom: Animalia
- Phylum: Arthropoda
- Clade: Pancrustacea
- Class: Insecta
- Order: Lepidoptera
- Family: Geometridae
- Genus: Metarranthis
- Species: M. homuraria

Binomial name
- Metarranthis homuraria (Grote & Robinson, 1868)

= Metarranthis homuraria =

Species of moth

Metarranthis homuraria, the purplish metarranthi, is a species of geometrid moth in the family Geometridae. It is found in North America.
