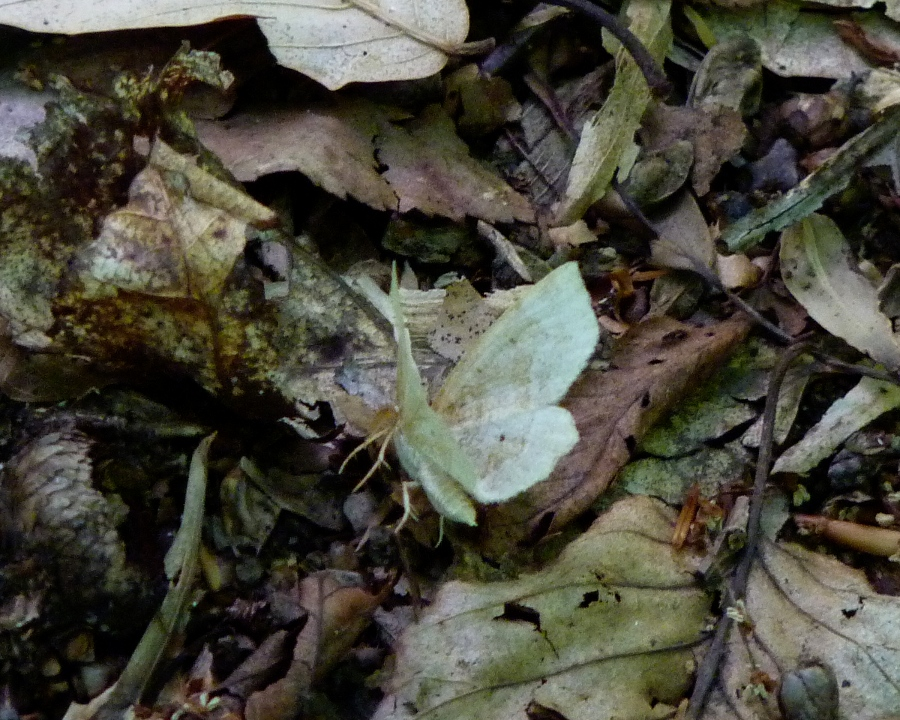

Scientific classification
- Kingdom: Animalia
- Phylum: Arthropoda
- Clade: Pancrustacea
- Class: Insecta
- Order: Lepidoptera
- Family: Geometridae
- Genus: Metarranthis
- Species: M. hypochraria

Binomial name
- Metarranthis hypochraria (Herrich-Schäffer, [1854])

= Metarranthis hypochraria =

Species of moth

Metarranthis hypochraria, the common metarranthis moth, is a moth of the family Geometridae. It is found in eastern North America.

The larvae feed on various trees and shrubs, but especially Prunus species. They are stick mimics. The larvae can be found from June to July in one generation per year.
