= Metarranthis amyrisaria =

Scientific classification
- Kingdom: Animalia
- Phylum: Arthropoda
- Class: Insecta
- Order: Lepidoptera
- Family: Geometridae
- Subfamily: Ennominae
- Genus: Metarranthis
- Species: M. amyrisaria

Binomial name
- Metarranthis amyrisaria (Walker, 1860)

Species of moth

Metarranthis amyrisaria is a species of geometrid moth in the family Geometridae. It is found in North America.

The MONA or Hodges number for Metarranthis amyrisaria is 6824.
