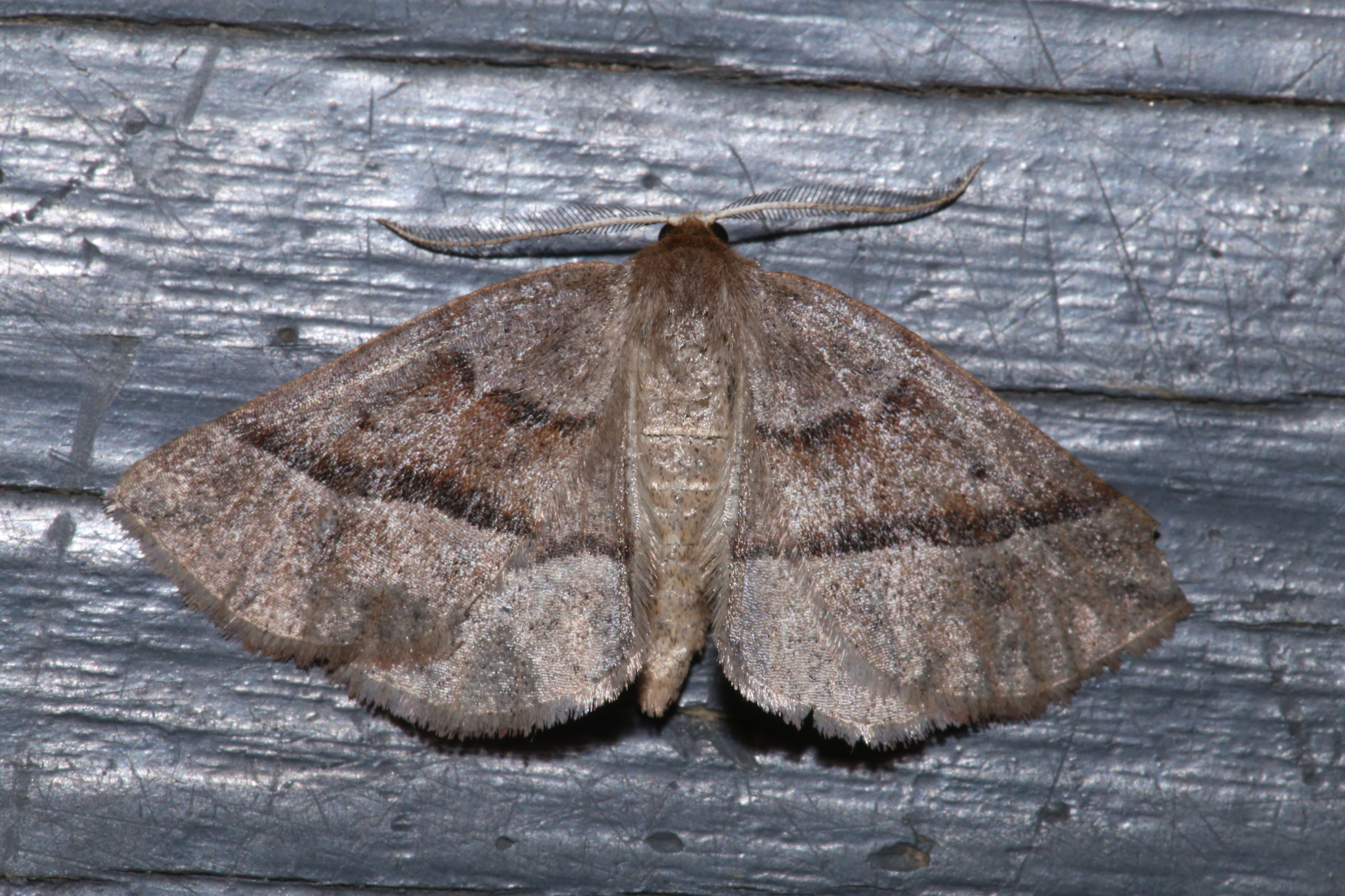

Scientific classification
- Domain: Eukaryota
- Kingdom: Animalia
- Phylum: Arthropoda
- Class: Insecta
- Order: Lepidoptera
- Family: Geometridae
- Subfamily: Ennominae
- Genus: Metarranthis
- Species: M. warneri

Binomial name
- Metarranthis warneri (Harvey, 1874)

= Metarranthis warneri =

Species of moth

Metarranthis warneri, commonly known as Warner's metarranthis, is a species of geometrid moth in the family Geometridae. It is found in North America.

== Subspecies ==
These two subspecies belong to the species Metarranthis warneri:

- Metarranthis warneri cappsaria Rupert, 1943
- Metarranthis warneri warneri
