= Metarranthis mollicularia =

Scientific classification
- Kingdom: Animalia
- Phylum: Arthropoda
- Clade: Pancrustacea
- Class: Insecta
- Order: Lepidoptera
- Family: Geometridae
- Genus: Metarranthis
- Species: M. mollicularia

Binomial name
- Metarranthis mollicularia (Zeller, 1872)

Species of moth

Metarranthis mollicularia is a species of geometrid moth in the family Geometridae. It is found in North America.

The MONA or Hodges number for Metarranthis mollicularia is 6833.
