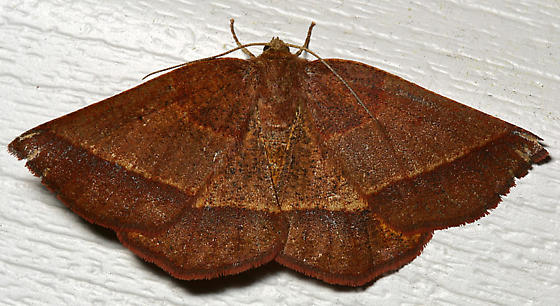

Scientific classification
- Kingdom: Animalia
- Phylum: Arthropoda
- Clade: Pancrustacea
- Class: Insecta
- Order: Lepidoptera
- Family: Geometridae
- Genus: Metarranthis
- Species: M. obfirmaria

Binomial name
- Metarranthis obfirmaria (Hübner, [1823])

Synonyms
- Epirranthis obfirmaria Hübner, [1823]

= Metarranthis obfirmaria =

Species of moth

Metarranthis obfirmaria, the yellow-washed metarranthis, is a moth of the family Geometridae. It is found in eastern North America, from Nova Scotia and southern Canada to Georgia, west to Kansas.

The wingspan is 26–36 mm. Adults are on wing from late April to July.

The larvae feed on Vaccinium, Prunus and Quercus species.
