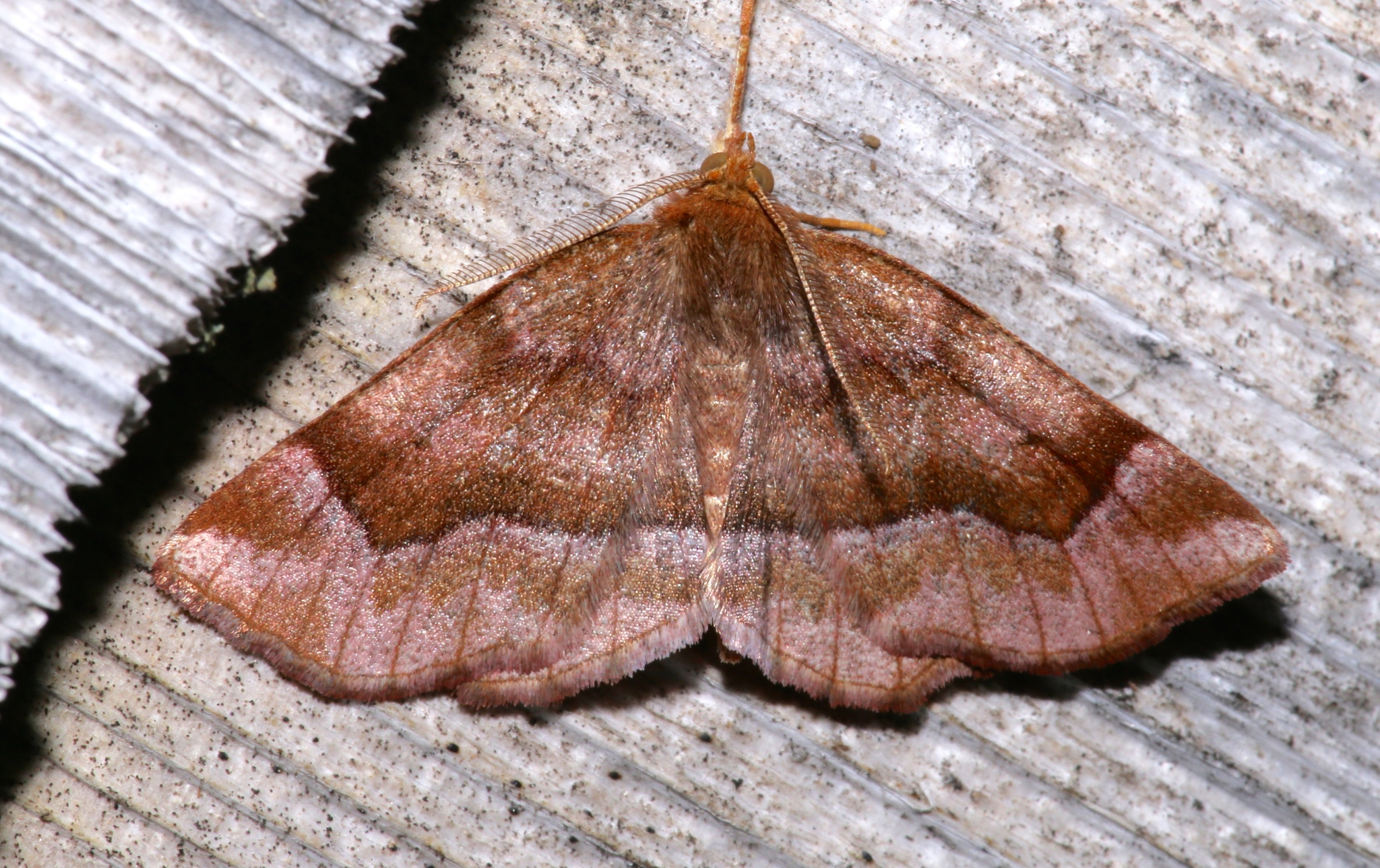

Scientific classification
- Kingdom: Animalia
- Phylum: Arthropoda
- Class: Insecta
- Order: Lepidoptera
- Family: Geometridae
- Subfamily: Ennominae
- Genus: Metarranthis
- Species: M. refractaria

Binomial name
- Metarranthis refractaria (Guenée in Boisduval & Guenée, 1858)

= Metarranthis refractaria =

Species of moth

Metarranthis refractaria, the refracted metarranthis, is a species of geometrid moth in the family Geometridae. It is found in North America.

The MONA or Hodges number for Metarranthis refractaria is 6827.
