= Metarranthis apiciaria =

Scientific classification
- Kingdom: Animalia
- Phylum: Arthropoda
- Clade: Pancrustacea
- Class: Insecta
- Order: Lepidoptera
- Family: Geometridae
- Genus: Metarranthis
- Species: M. apiciaria

Binomial name
- Metarranthis apiciaria (Packard, 1876)

Species of moth

Metarranthis apiciaria, the barrens metarranthis moth, is a moth in the family Geometridae that is native to North America. The species was first described by Packard in 1876. It is listed as endangered in Massachusetts, and as a species of special concern in Connecticut.
