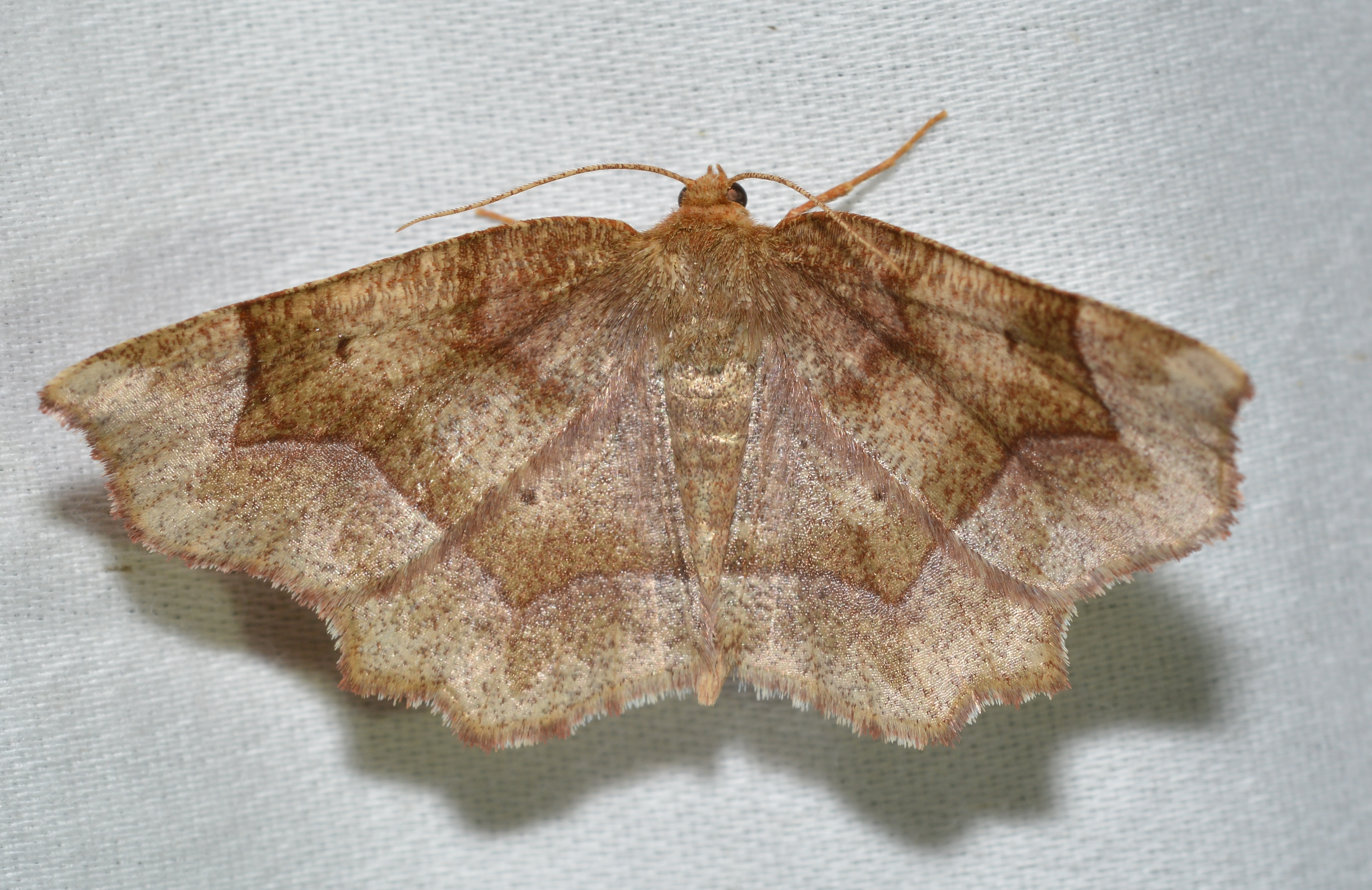

Scientific classification
- Kingdom: Animalia
- Phylum: Arthropoda
- Class: Insecta
- Order: Lepidoptera
- Family: Geometridae
- Genus: Metarranthis
- Species: M. indeclinata

Binomial name
- Metarranthis indeclinata (Walker, 1861)

= Metarranthis indeclinata =

Species of moth

Metarranthis indeclinata, the pale metarranthi, is a species of geometrid moth in the family Geometridae. It is found in North America.

The MONA or Hodges number for Metarranthis indeclinata is 6825.
