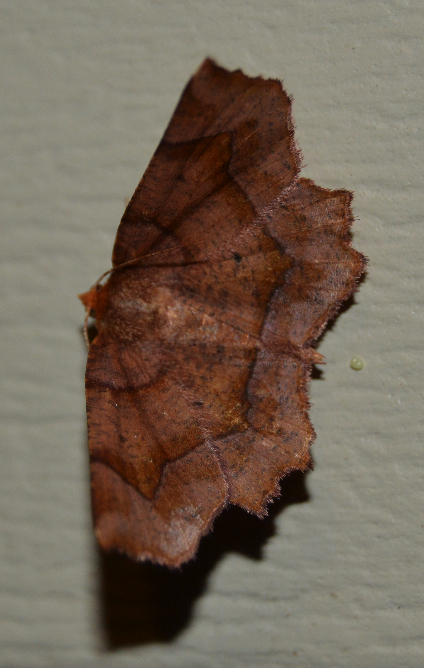
- Metarranthis homuraria

Scientific classification
- Domain: Eukaryota
- Kingdom: Animalia
- Phylum: Arthropoda
- Class: Insecta
- Order: Lepidoptera
- Family: Geometridae
- Subfamily: Ennominae
- Genus: Metarranthis; Warren, 1894

= Metarranthis =

Genus of moths

Metarranthis is a genus of moths in the family Geometridae first described by Warren in 1894.

Wingspan, 30–43 mm. Habitat, deciduous forests. Larvae feed on deciduous trees and shrubs. Adults active April to June.

== Species ==
- Metarranthis amyrisaria (Walker, 1860)
- Metarranthis angularia Barnes & McDunnough, 1917
- Metarranthis apiciaria (Packard, 1876)
- Metarranthis duaria (Guenée, 1857)
- Metarranthis homuraria (Grote & Robinson, 1868)
- Metarranthis hypochraria (Herrich-Schäffer, 1854)
- Metarranthis indeclinata (Walker, 1861)
- Metarranthis lateritiaria (Guenée, 1857)
- Metarranthis mollicularia (Zeller, 1872)
- Metarranthis obfirmaria (Hübner, [1823])
- Metarranthis pilosaria (Packard, 1876)
- Metarranthis refractaria (Guenée, 1857)
- Metarranthis warneri (Harvey, 1874)
