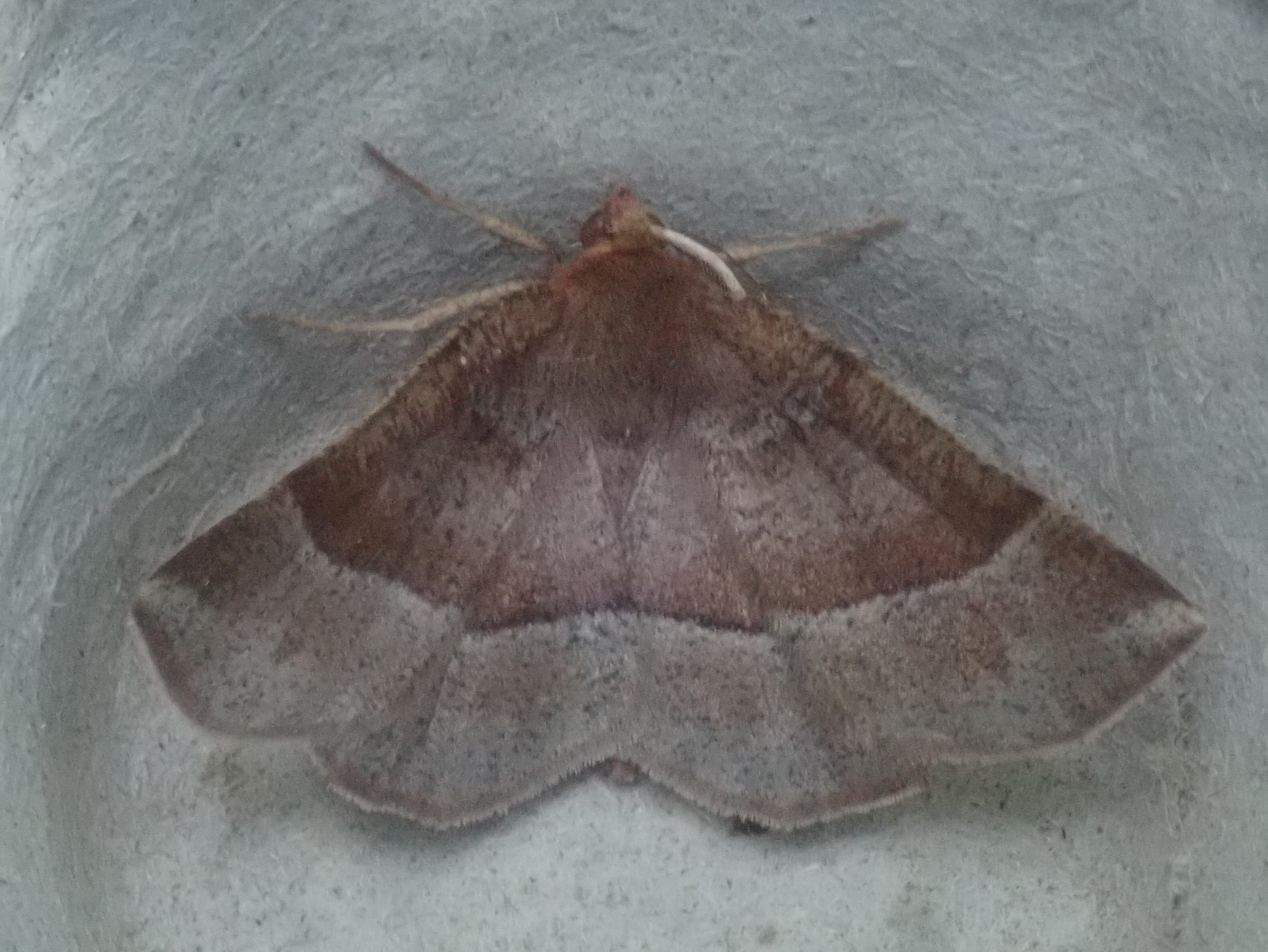

Scientific classification
- Kingdom: Animalia
- Phylum: Arthropoda
- Clade: Pancrustacea
- Class: Insecta
- Order: Lepidoptera
- Family: Geometridae
- Genus: Metarranthis
- Species: M. pilosaria

Binomial name
- Metarranthis pilosaria (Packard, 1876)

= Metarranthis pilosaria =

Species of moth

Metarranthis pilosaria, commonly known as the coastal bog metarranthi or slender groundsel moth, is a species of geometrid moth in the family Geometridae. It is found in North America.
