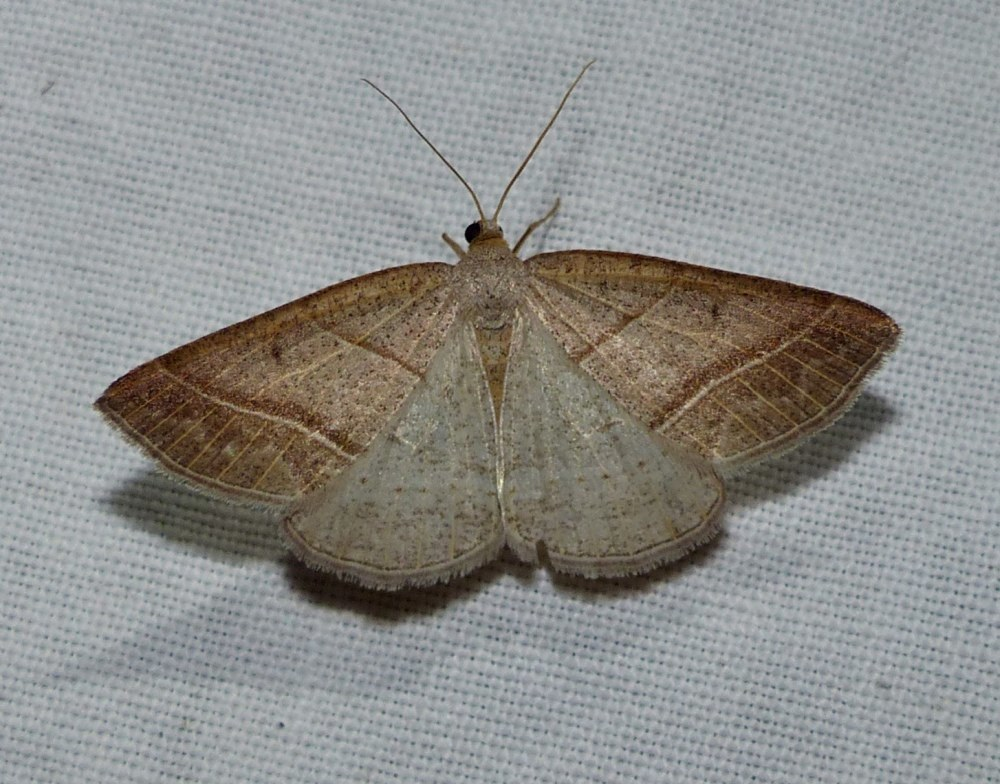

Scientific classification
- Kingdom: Animalia
- Phylum: Arthropoda
- Class: Insecta
- Order: Lepidoptera
- Family: Geometridae
- Genus: Petrophora
- Species: P. subaequaria

Binomial name
- Petrophora subaequaria (Walker in D'Urban, 1860)

= Petrophora subaequaria =

Species of moth

Petrophora subaequaria, the northern petrophora, is a species of geometrid moth in the family Geometridae. It was described by Francis Walker in 1860 and is found in North America.
