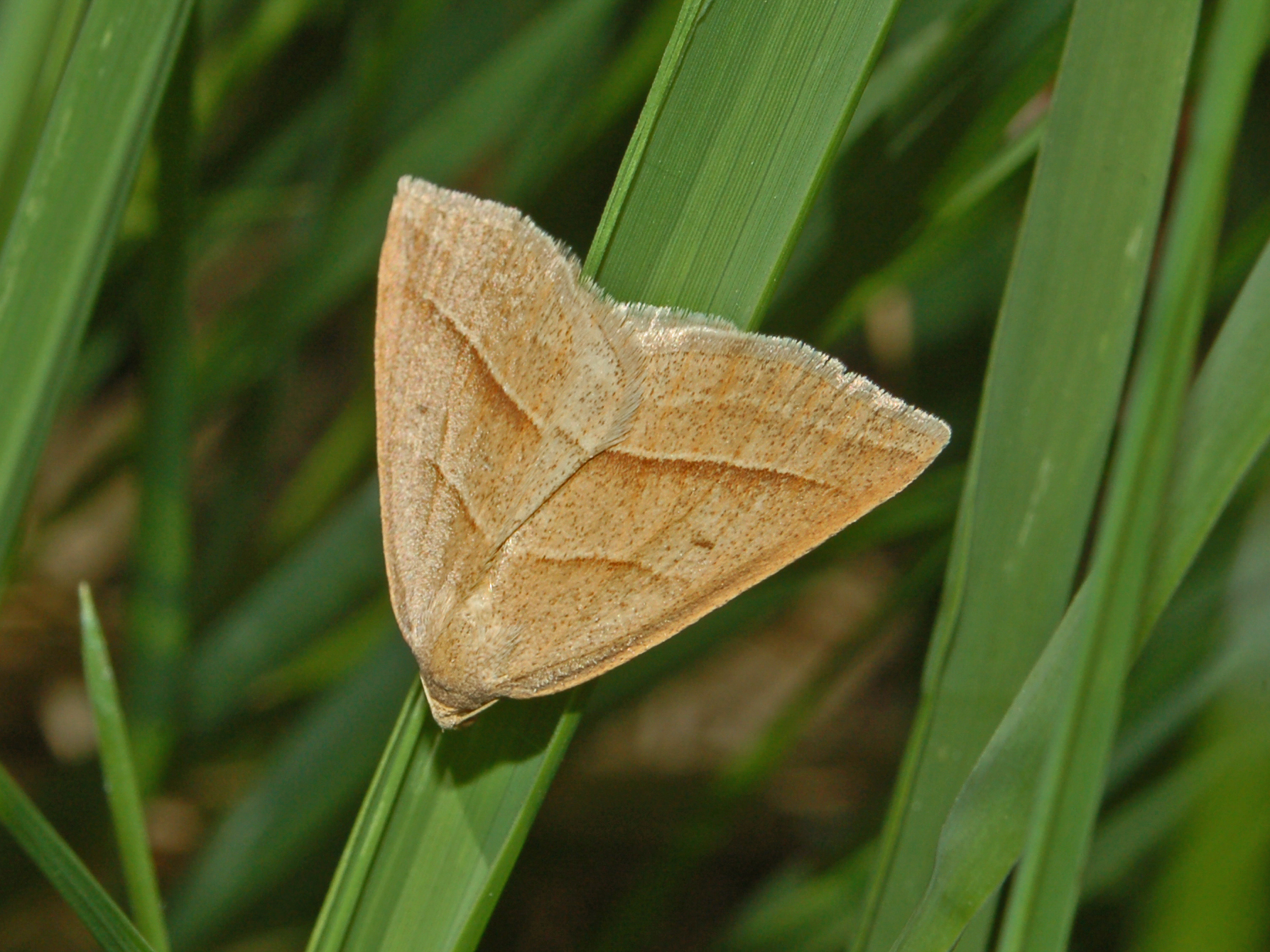
- Petrophora chlorosata

Scientific classification
- Domain: Eukaryota
- Kingdom: Animalia
- Phylum: Arthropoda
- Class: Insecta
- Order: Lepidoptera
- Family: Geometridae
- Tribe: Lithinini
- Genus: Petrophora; Hübner, 1811

= Petrophora =

Genus of moths

Petrophora is a genus of moths in the family Geometridae erected by Jacob Hübner in 1811.

== Species ==
- Petrophora binaevata (Mabille, 1869)
- Petrophora chlorosata (Scopoli, 1763)
- Petrophora convergata (de Villers, 1789)
- Petrophora divisata Hübner, 1811
- Petrophora narbonea (Linnaeus, 1767)
- Petrophora subaequaria (Walker in D'Urban, 1860)
