= Petrophora divisata =

Scientific classification
- Kingdom: Animalia
- Phylum: Arthropoda
- Clade: Pancrustacea
- Class: Insecta
- Order: Lepidoptera
- Family: Geometridae
- Genus: Petrophora
- Species: P. divisata

Binomial name
- Petrophora divisata Hübner, 1811

Species of moth

Petrophora divisata, the common petrophora moth, is a species of geometrid moth in the family Geometridae. It is found in North America.

The MONA or Hodges number for Petrophora divisata is 6803.
