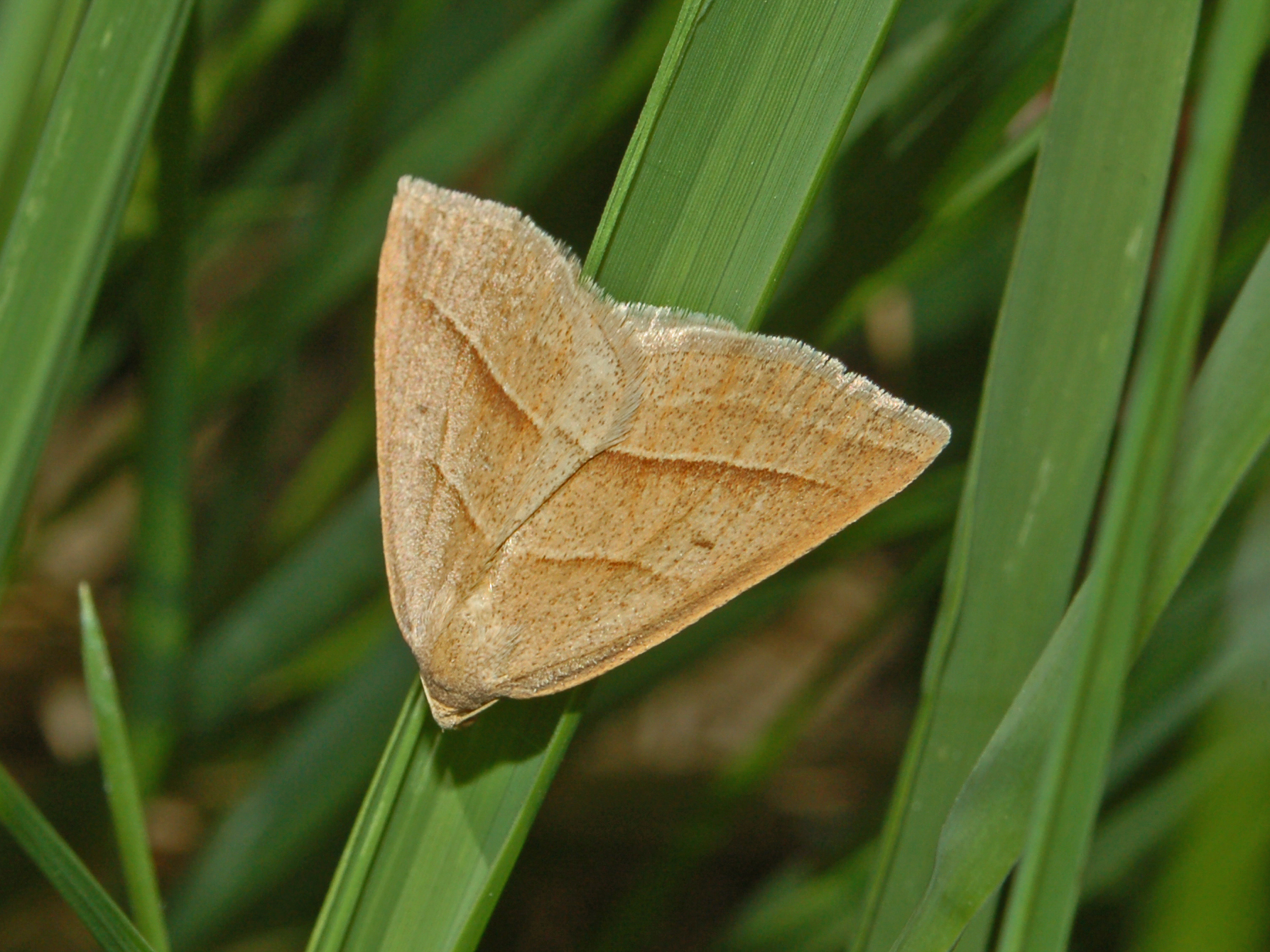

Scientific classification
- Kingdom: Animalia
- Phylum: Arthropoda
- Clade: Pancrustacea
- Class: Insecta
- Order: Lepidoptera
- Family: Geometridae
- Genus: Petrophora
- Species: P. chlorosata

Binomial name
- Petrophora chlorosata (Scopoli, 1763)

Synonyms
- Phalaena chlorosata Scopoli, 1763

= Petrophora chlorosata =

Species of moth

Petrophora chlorosata, the brown silver-line, is a moth of the family Geometridae found in Asia and Europe. The larvae feed on bracken. It was first described by the Italian physician and naturalist, Giovanni Antonio Scopoli in his 1763 Entomologia Carniolica.

== Description ==
The wingspan is 31–37 mm. The length of the forewings is 15–18 mm. Quite distinct from all other Palearctic species, the forewing light brown, the lines finely whitish, proximally dark shaded, subterminal line rather straight, sometimes indistinct. The moth flies from the end of April to the end of June and are readily flushed from the foodpant or surrounding vegetation. They are also attracted to light.

Ova

The egg has an elliptical shape and is initially light yellow, later orange. It is covered with 24 to 25 longitudinal ribs. The microphyll rosette is nine to ten-leaf.

Larva

The caterpillars have a brownish or greenish colour, show fine dark longitudinal lines and a wide whitish or yellowish side stripe. They feed on bracken (Pteridium aquilinum) from about mid-June to early September, although most have pupated in the soil by late July.

Pupa

Overwinters as a pupa.

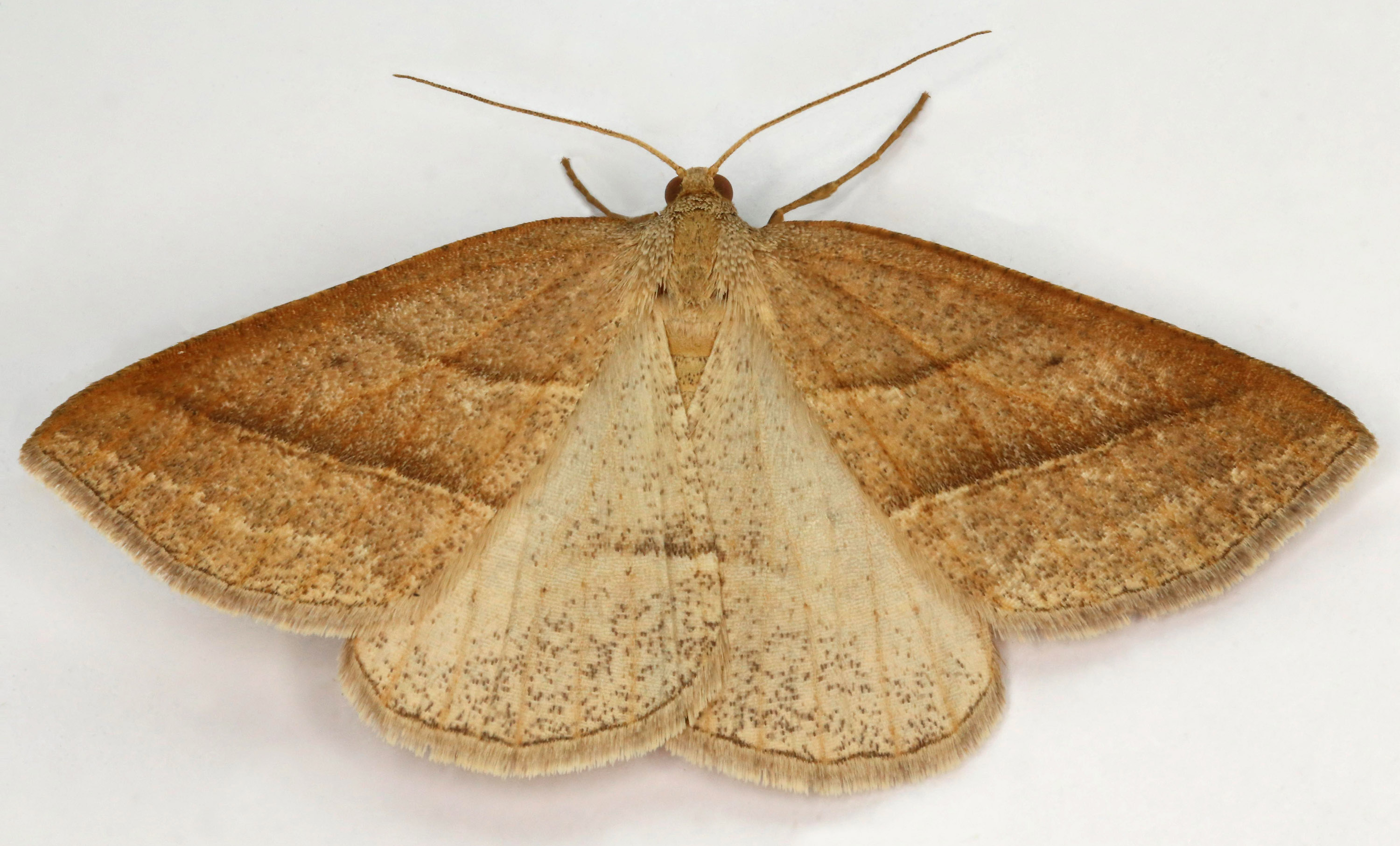
Imago

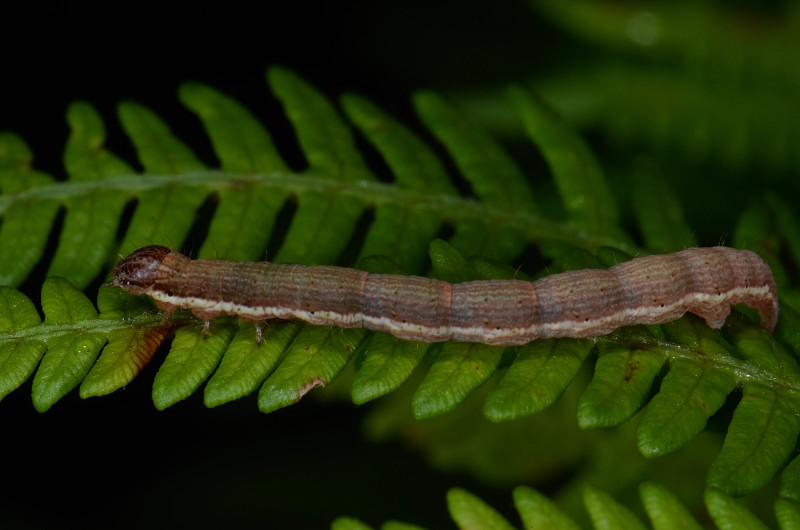
Larva

== Distribution ==
It is found in the Palearctic extending from Ireland and Britain to Asia Minor, northern Iran, the Altai Mountains, Amdo, south-eastern Siberia, and Japan.

== Notes ==
1. The flight season refers to Belgium and the Netherlands. This may vary in other parts of the range.
