= List of geometrid genera: P =

The very large moth family Geometridae contains genera beginning with A, B, C, D, E, F, G, H, I, J, K, L, M, N, O, P, Q, R, S, T, U, V, W, X, Y and Z.

Those beginning with P include:

- Pachista
- Pachrophylla
- Pachycnemia
- Pachycopsis
- Pachydia
- Pachyerannis
- Pachyligia
- Pachyodes
- Pachypalpella
- Pachyplocia
- Pachythalia
- Pachytyla
- Pagrasa
- Palaeaspilates
- Palaeodoxa
- Palaeomystis
- Palaeonyssia
- Paleacrita
- Palleopa
- Palpoctenidia
- Palyas
- Pammeris
- Pamphlebia
- Panaethia
- Panagra
- Panagropsis
- Panisala
- Panopaea
- Pantherodes
- Panulia
- Paota
- Papago
- Papuanticlea
- Papuarisme
- Parabapta
- Paraboarmia
- Paracalicha
- Parachlorissa
- Parachoreutes
- Paracomistis
- Paracotis
- Paracrocota
- Paradarisa
- Paradetis
- Paradmeta
- Paradoxodes
- Paradromulia
- Paradysstroma
- Paragathia
- Paraglaucina
- Paragonia
- Paragonodontis
- Paragramma
- Paragyrtis
- Paralaea
- Paralcidia
- Paralcis
- Parallage
- Paralobophora
- Paralygris
- Paramathia
- Paramaxates
- Paramelora
- Parametrodes
- Paramilionia
- Paranotoreas
- Parapachrophylla
- Parapalta
- Parapercnia
- Parapheromia
- Paraphia
- Paraphoides
- Paraplaneta
- Paraplodes
- Paraprasina
- Paraptera
- Paraptychodes
- Parargyrotome
- Parasthena
- Parasynegia
- Paraterpna
- Parathemis
- Paratyria
- Parazeuxis
- Parazoma
- Pardodes
- Pareclipsis
- Parectropis
- Pareilicrinia
- Parennomos
- Parentephria
- Parenzanella
- Parepione
- Parepisparis
- Pareuchloris
- Pareulype
- Pareumelea
- Pareupithex
- Pareuschema
- Pareustroma
- Parexcelsa
- Paricterodes
- Parietaria
- Parobeidia
- Parodontorhoe
- Paromala
- Paromphacodes
- Paronychora
- Parortholitha
- Parosteodes
- Parourapteryx
- Parrhesia
- Pasiphila
- Pasiphilodes
- Passa
- Patalene
- Patridava
- Patruissa
- Pauresthes
- Paurocoma
- Peetula
- Pelagodes
- Pellonia
- Pelurga
- Pena
- Pennithera
- Pentheochlora
- Penthophlebia
- Pepasmenoptera
- Peratodactyla
- Peratophyga
- Peratostega
- Percnia
- Percnoptilota
- Perconia
- Pergama
- Peribatodes
- Peribolodes
- Periclina
- Peridela
- Peridelias
- Perigramma
- Perigune
- Perissolophia
- Peristygis
- Perithalera
- Perixera
- Perizoma
- Pero
- Perusia
- Perusiopsis
- Petelia
- Petersenia
- Petovia
- Petrodava
- Petrophora
- Phacelophora
- Phaeoura
- Phaesyle
- Phaiogramma
- Phalaenites
- Phallaria
- Phaludia
- Phanauta
- Phanerothyris
- Phaselia
- Phasiane
- Phaulostathma
- Phellinodes
- Phelodes
- Phelotis
- Phengommataea
- Pherne
- Pherotesia
- Phibalpteryx
- Phigalia
- Phigaliohybernia
- Philedia
- Philereme
- Philobia
- Philolochma
- Philopsia
- Philtraea
- Phlebosphales
- Phoenicocampa
- Phoenissa
- Phoenix
- Pholodes
- Photoscotosia
- Phrataria
- Phrissogonus
- Phrissosceles
- Phrixocomes
- Phrudocentra
- Phrudochorda
- Phrudophleps
- Phrudoplaga
- Phrudura
- Phrygionis
- Phthonandria
- Phthonoloba
- Phthonosema
- Phthorarcha
- Phylace
- Phyle
- Phyletis
- Phyllabraxas
- Phyllia
- Phyllodonta
- Phyllometra
- Physetobasis
- Physetostege
- Physocleora
- Physoloba
- Physostegania
- Picromorpha
- Picrophylla
- Piercia
- Pigia
- Pigiopsis
- Pimaphera
- Pingarmia
- Pingasa
- Pisoraca
- Pitthea
- Pityeja
- Placotome
- Plagodis
- Planiciampa
- Planolocha
- Plataea
- Plateoplia
- Platisodes
- Platycerota
- Platypepla
- Plectoneura
- Plectroboarmia
- Plegapteryx
- Pleionocentra
- Plemyria
- Plemyriopsis
- Pleogynopteryx
- Plesanemma
- Plesiolaea
- Plesiomorpha
- Plesiophyle
- Plesioscotosia
- Pleurolopha
- Pleuroprucha
- Plocucha
- Plusargyria
- Plutodes
- Pocophora
- Poecilalcis
- Poecilasthena
- Poecilochlora
- Poecilopsis
- Poecilostigma
- Pogonogya
- Pogonopygia
- Politeia
- Polla
- Polyacme
- Polyclysta
- Polycrasta
- Polygraphodes
- Polylophodes
- Polymixinia
- Polynesia
- Polyomma
- Polyphasia
- Polyscia
- Polysemia
- Polysphalia
- Polystroma
- Polythrena
- Pomasia
- Porona
- Postazuayia
- Potera
- Povilasia
- Poya
- Praeantarctia
- Praeapodroma
- Praegnophosema
- Praesos
- Praethera
- Prasinochrysa
- Prasinocyma
- Prasinoscia
- Prasonesis
- Priapodes
- Priocycla
- Prionodonta
- Prionomelia
- Prionostrenia
- Pristopera
- Pristostegania
- Proagra
- Probithia
- Problepsiodes
- Problepsis
- Probolaea
- Probole
- Proboloptera
- Probolosceles
- Prochasma
- Prochoerodes
- Procypha
- Progonodes
- Progonostola
- Prohydata
- Prometopidia
- Proomphe
- Prophasiane
- Propithecia
- Propithex
- Prorella
- Prorhinia
- Prorocorys
- Prorocrania
- Prosomphax
- Prosotera
- Prospasta
- Prostenodes
- Prosthetopteryx
- Protalcis
- Protaulaca
- Proteopharmacis
- Proteostrenia
- Proteuchloris
- Protitame
- Protoboarmia
- Protonebula
- Protophyta
- Protoproutia
- Protorhoe
- Protosteira
- Protosyneora
- Prototypa
- Protuliocnemis
- Proutiana
- Proutictis
- Proutoscia
- Psaliodes
- Psamatodes
- Psednothrix
- Pseudabraxas
- Pseudalcis
- Pseudaleucis
- Pseudangerona
- Pseudapicia
- Pseudaria
- Pseudasellodes
- Pseudaspilates
- Pseudasthena
- Pseudentephria
- Pseudepione
- Pseuderannis
- Pseuderythra
- Pseuderythrolophus
- Pseudeuchlora
- Pseudeuchromia
- Pseudeusemia
- Pseudhemithea
- Pseudidiochlora
- Pseudiodis
- Pseudobaptria
- Pseudobracca
- Pseudobrephos
- Pseudocassyma
- Pseudochesias
- Pseudocinglis
- Pseudocollix
- Pseudocomostola
- Pseudocoremia
- Pseudocrocinis
- Pseudodysstroma
- Pseudognophos
- Pseudoisturgia
- Pseudolarentia
- Pseudomaenas
- Pseudomennis
- Pseudomimetis
- Pseudomiza
- Pseudonadagara
- Pseudopanthera
- Pseudopolynesia
- Pseudopsodos
- Pseudosalpis
- Pseudosauris
- Pseudoschista
- Pseudosestra
- Pseudosiona
- Pseudosoloe
- Pseudostegania
- Pseudosterrha
- Pseudosyngria
- Pseudoterpna
- Pseudothalera
- Pseustoplaca
- Psilalcis
- Psilaspilates
- Psilephyra
- Psilocambogia
- Psilocerea
- Psilocladia
- Psilonaxa
- Psilopora
- Psilosetia
- Psilosticha
- Psilotagma
- Psilotaphria
- Psodopsis
- Psodos
- Psychogoes
- Psychophora
- Psyra
- Psyroides
- Ptenopoda
- Pterapherapteryx
- Pterocypha
- Pterospoda
- Pterotaea
- Pterotocera
- Pterygnophos
- Ptochophyle
- Ptomophyle
- Ptychamalia
- Ptychopoda
- Ptychorhoe
- Ptychotheca
- Ptygmatophora
- Pucaraia
- Puebla
- Pulchralata
- Pullichroma
- Pungeleria
- Pycnodontia
- Pycnoloma
- Pycnoneura
- Pycnostega
- Pyctis
- Pydna
- Pygmaena
- Pygmaeopsis
- Pylarge
- Pylargosceles
- Pynthanosis
- Pyrinia
- Pyrochlora
- Pyrrhaspis
- Pyrrhorachis
- Pythodora
