= Papago =

Papago may refer to:

- A former term for Tohono Oʼodham people
- A former term for the language spoken by the Tohono Oʼodham people
- Papago (moth), a genus of geometer moths
- Papago Freeway, I-10 through Phoenix, Arizona
- Deck Park Tunnel, a tunnel in Arizona formerly named the Papago Freeway Tunnel
- Papago Park, a park in Arizona
- Papago, Saipan, a village in the northern part of the island of Saipan
- Naver Papago, a translation service
- USS Papago (ATF-160), a ship of the U.S. Navy
- Great Papago Escape, a mass escape by Axis P.O.W.s from an American facility during World War Two
