= Panagra =

Panagra may refer to:

- Panagra (moth), a genus of moth in the family Geometridae
- Panagra, Cyprus, a village in Cyprus
- Pan American-Grace Airways, a former airline
