= Parrhesia (disambiguation) =

Parrhesia is a rhetoric practice.

It may also refer to:

- Parrhesia (moth), a moth genus
- Parrhasia (Arcadia), a region of Ancient Greece
- Parrhesia, an academic journal
- Parrhesia, a music album
