= Polla =

Polla may refer to:

== Places ==
- Pölla, a municipality of Zwettl, Lower Austria
- Polla, Italy, a town in Salerno, Campania, Italy
- Polla, a place in Scotland, see List of listed buildings in Durness, Highland

== People ==
- Polla Argentaria, wife of Lucan
- Vespasia Polla, mother of the Roman emperor Vespasian
- Vipsania Polla, sister of Marcus Vipsanius Agrippa
- Acerronia Polla (died 59 AD), friend of Agrippina the Younger

=== Surname ===
- Barbara Polla (born 1950), Swiss art writer
- Jordi El Niño Polla (born 1994), Spanish pornographic actor
- Christian Pollas (born 1947), French astronomer

== Other uses ==
- Polla (moth), a genus in the family Geometridae
- La Polla Records, a Spanish punk band
