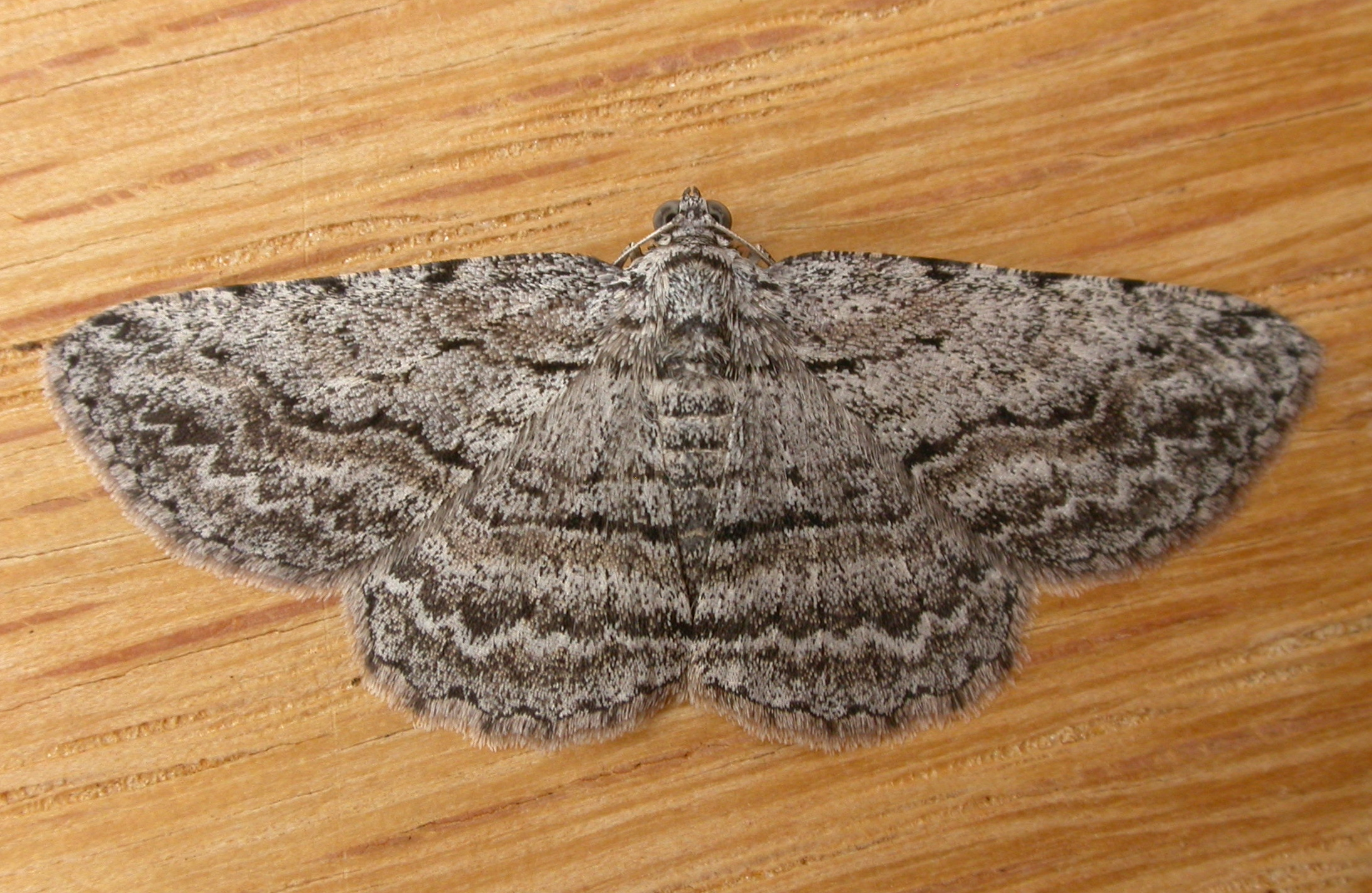

Scientific classification
- Kingdom: Animalia
- Phylum: Arthropoda
- Clade: Pancrustacea
- Class: Insecta
- Order: Lepidoptera
- Family: Geometridae
- Genus: Psilosticha
- Species: P. attacta

Binomial name
- Psilosticha attacta Walker, 1860

Synonyms
- Boarmia attacta Walker, 1860; Tephrosia integraria Walker, 1860; Boarmia cymatias Turner, 1947

= Psilosticha attacta =

Species of moth

Psilosticha attacta is a moth of the family Geometridae first described by Francis Walker in 1860. It is found in Australia.
