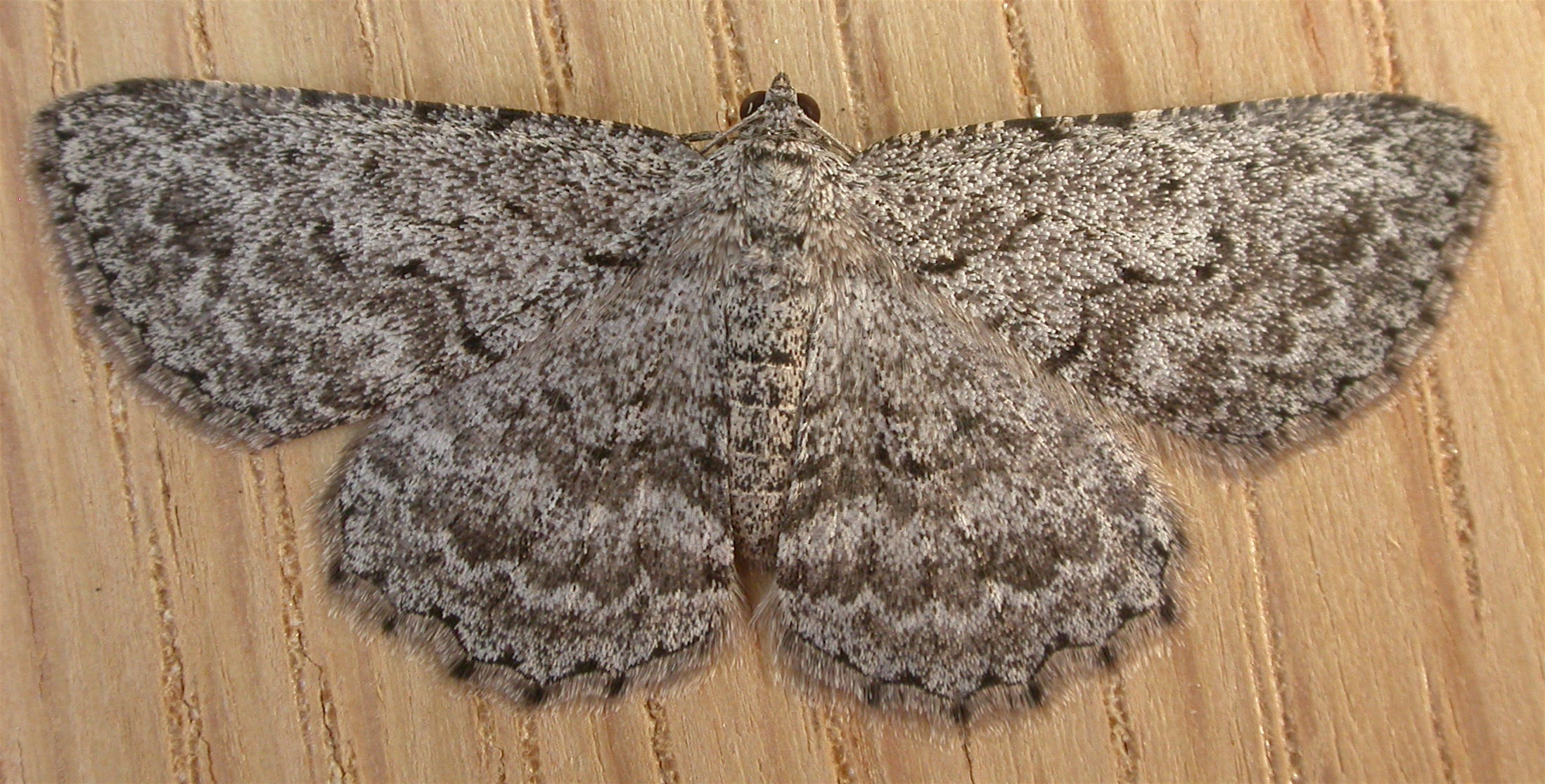

Scientific classification
- Kingdom: Animalia
- Phylum: Arthropoda
- Class: Insecta
- Order: Lepidoptera
- Family: Geometridae
- Genus: Psilosticha
- Species: P. absorpta

Binomial name
- Psilosticha absorpta Walker, 1860

= Psilosticha absorpta =

Species of moth

Psilosticha absorpta is a moth of the family Geometridae first described by Francis Walker in 1860. It is found in Australia.
