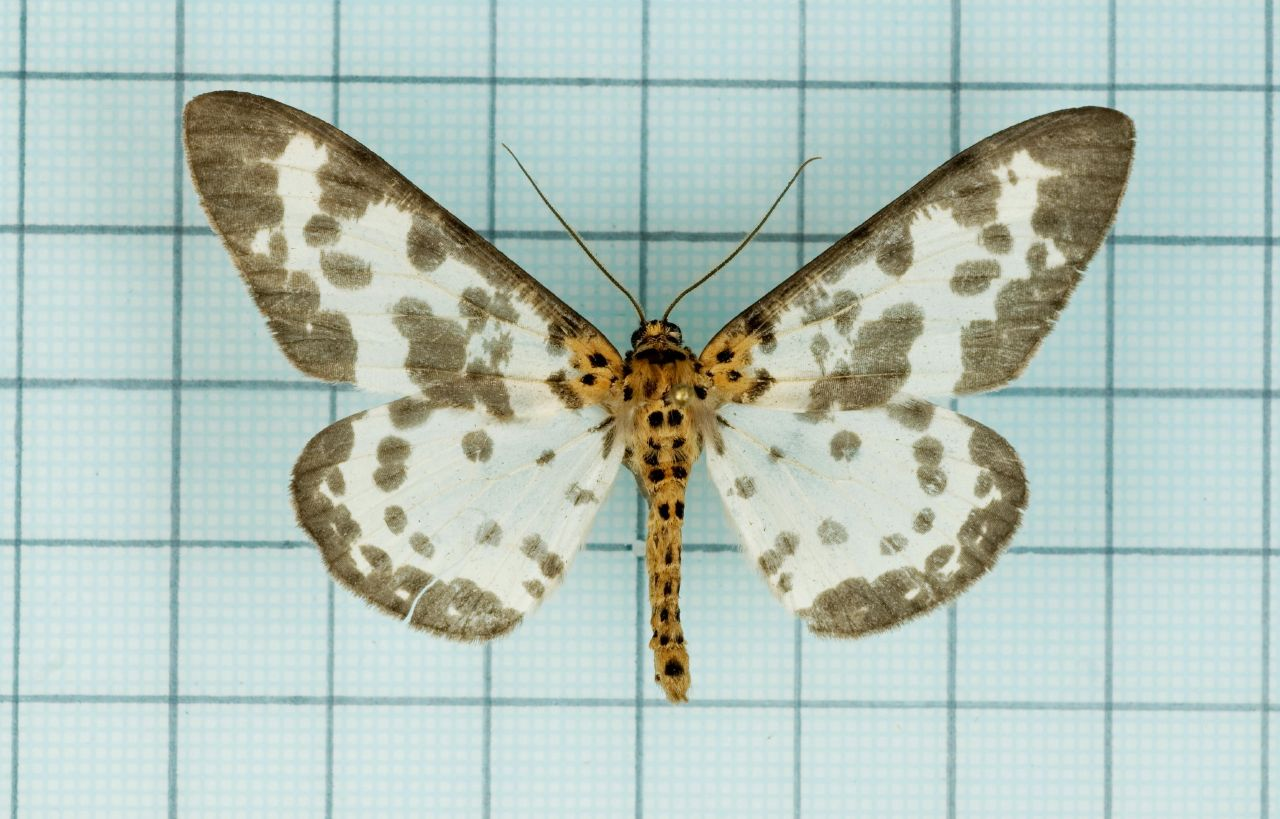

Scientific classification
- Kingdom: Animalia
- Phylum: Arthropoda
- Clade: Pancrustacea
- Class: Insecta
- Order: Lepidoptera
- Family: Geometridae
- Genus: Percnia
- Species: P. longitermen

Binomial name
- Percnia longitermen Prout, 1914

= Percnia longitermen =

Species of moth

Percnia longitermen is a species of moth of the family Geometridae first described by Louis Beethoven Prout in 1914. It is found in Taiwan.
