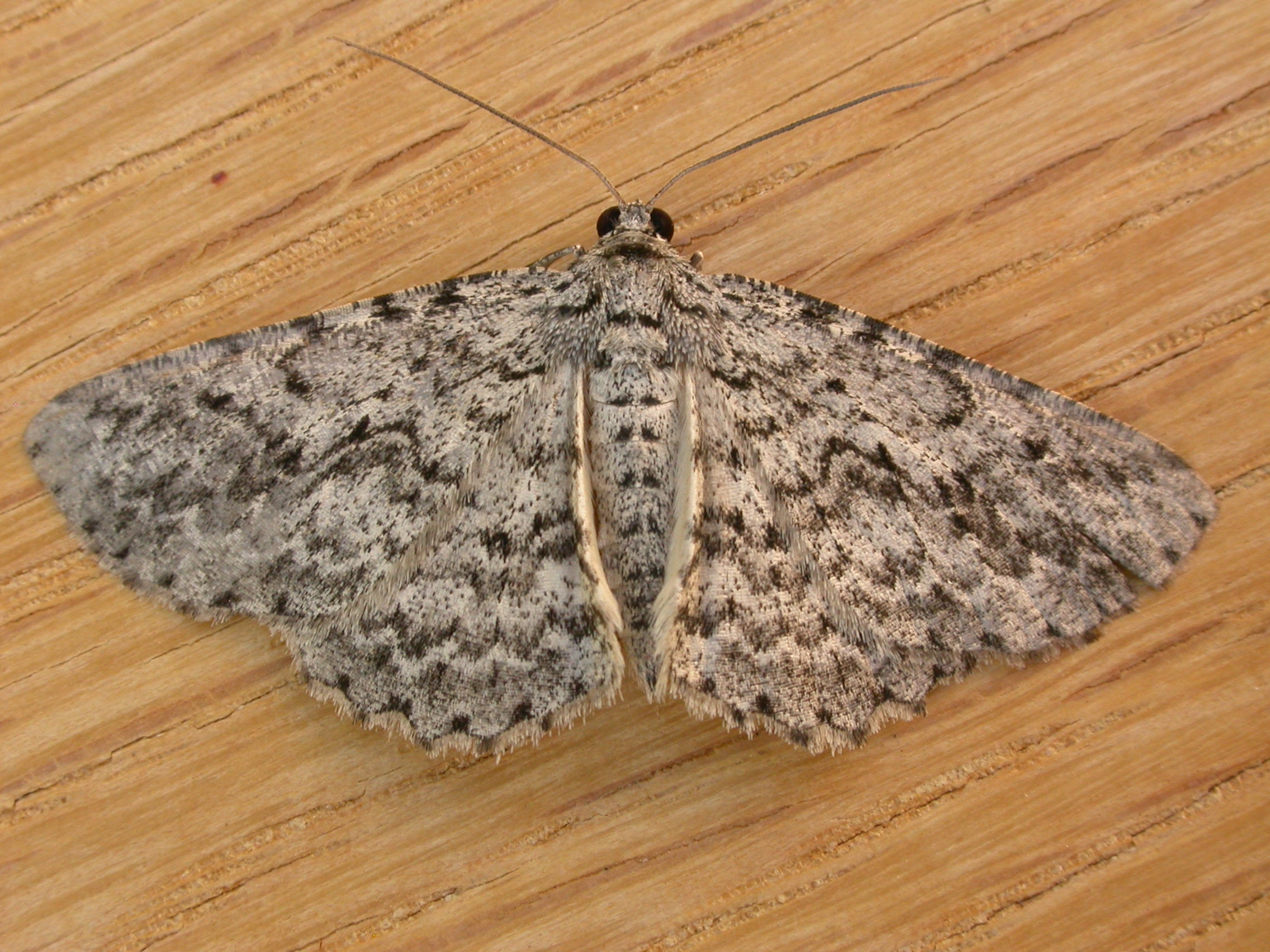

Scientific classification
- Domain: Eukaryota
- Kingdom: Animalia
- Phylum: Arthropoda
- Class: Insecta
- Order: Lepidoptera
- Family: Geometridae
- Genus: Psilosticha
- Species: P. mactaria

Binomial name
- Psilosticha mactaria Guenée, 1857

Synonyms
- Boarmia atycta

= Psilosticha mactaria =

Species of moth

Psilosticha mactaria is a species of moth of the family Geometridae. It is found in New South Wales and Tasmania.
