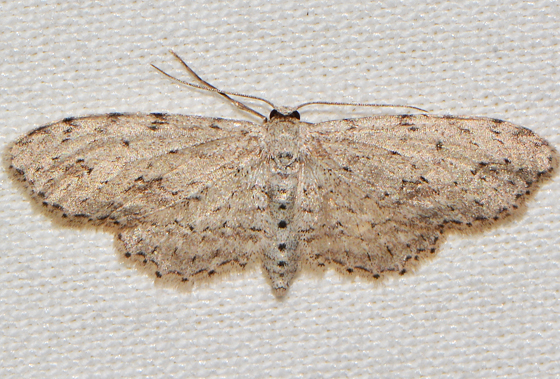

Scientific classification
- Kingdom: Animalia
- Phylum: Arthropoda
- Class: Insecta
- Order: Lepidoptera
- Family: Geometridae
- Genus: Pimaphera
- Species: P. sparsaria

Binomial name
- Pimaphera sparsaria (Walker, 1863)

= Pimaphera sparsaria =

Species of moth

Pimaphera sparsaria is a species of geometrid moth in the family Geometridae. It is found in North America.

The MONA or Hodges number for Pimaphera sparsaria is 6442.

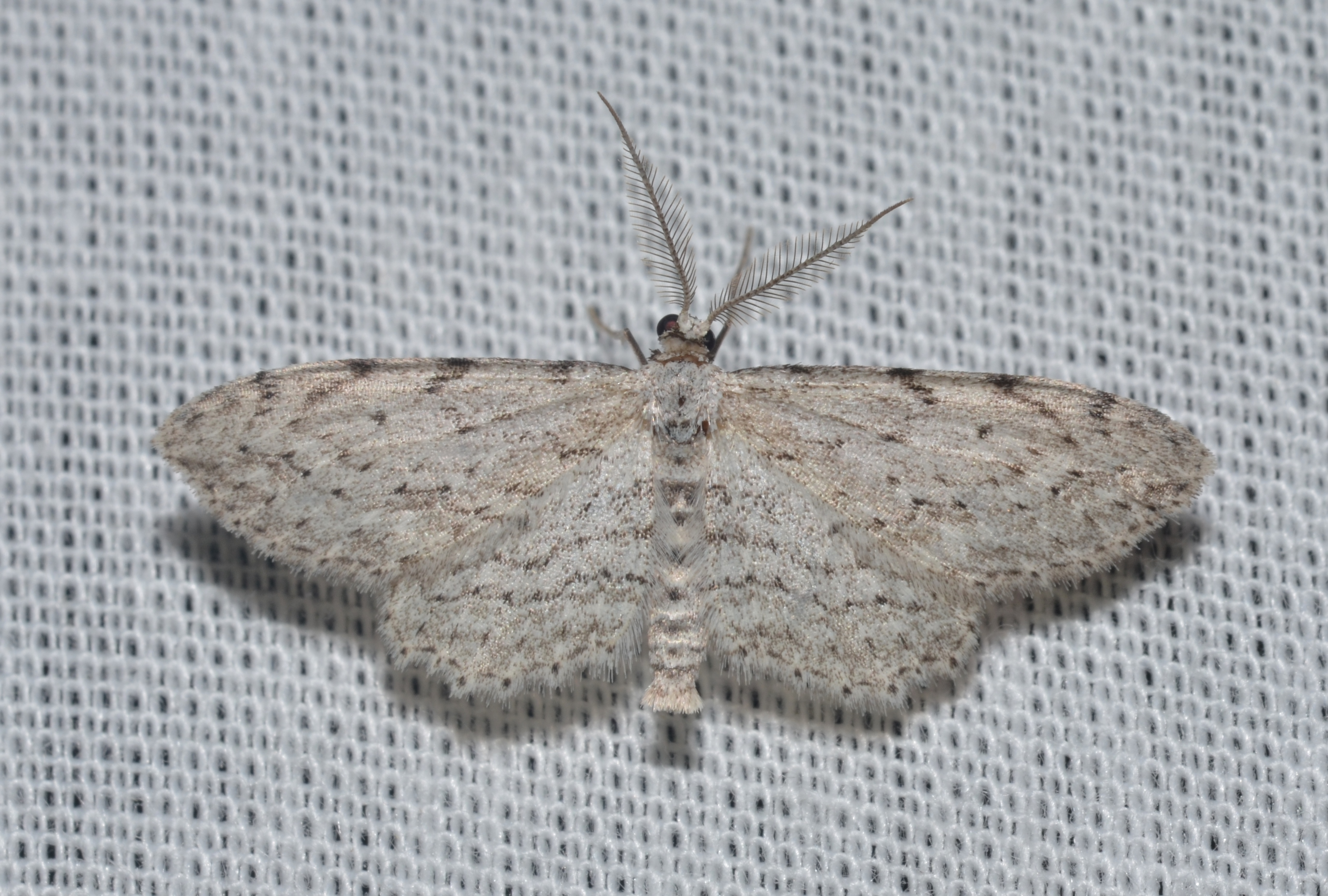
