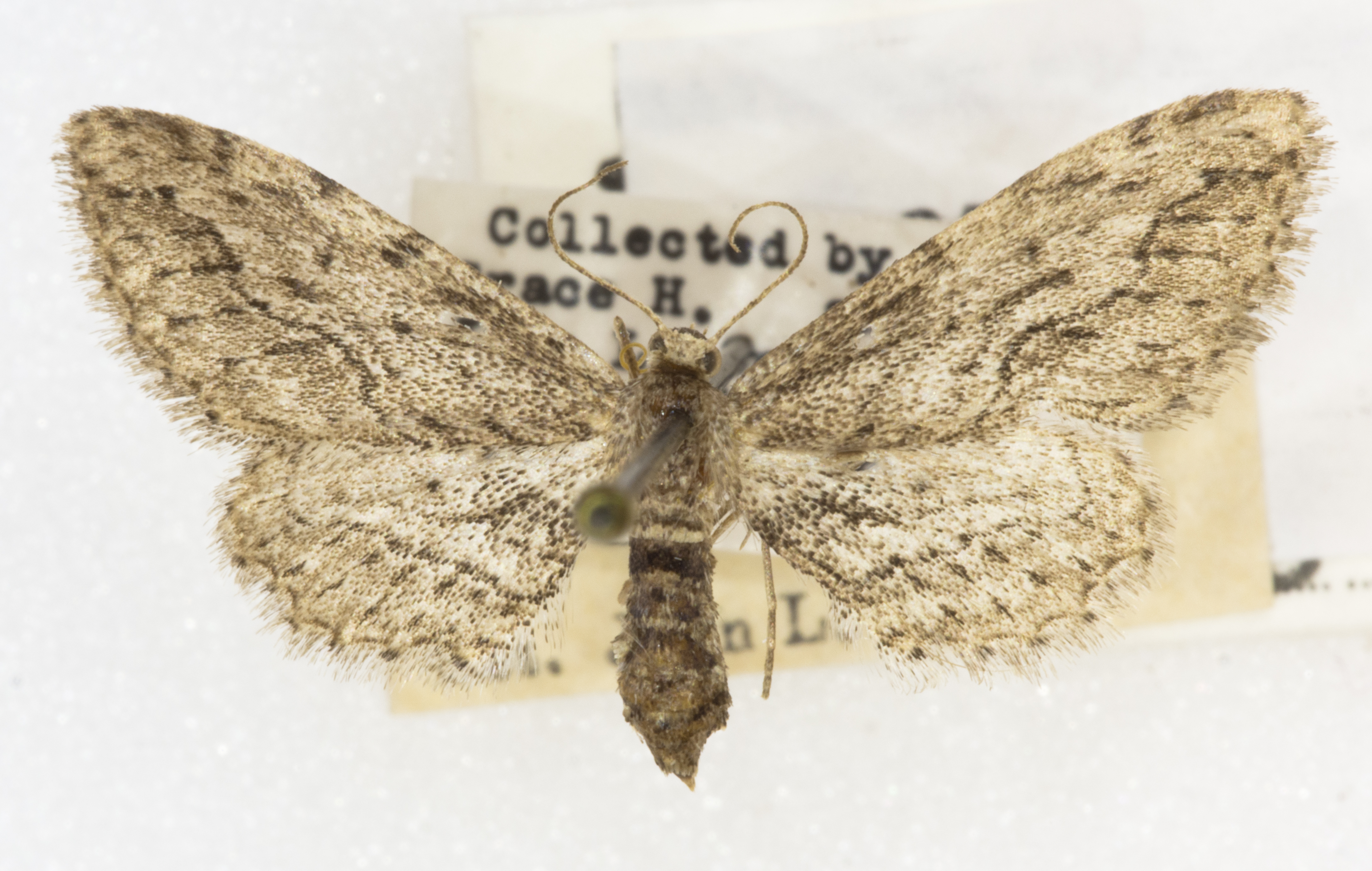

Scientific classification
- Domain: Eukaryota
- Kingdom: Animalia
- Phylum: Arthropoda
- Class: Insecta
- Order: Lepidoptera
- Family: Geometridae
- Tribe: Boarmiini
- Genus: Pimaphera
- Species: P. percata

Binomial name
- Pimaphera percata Cassino & Swett, 1927

= Pimaphera percata =

Species of moth

Pimaphera percata is a species of geometrid moth in the family Geometridae. It is found in North America.

The MONA or Hodges number for Pimaphera percata is 6441.
