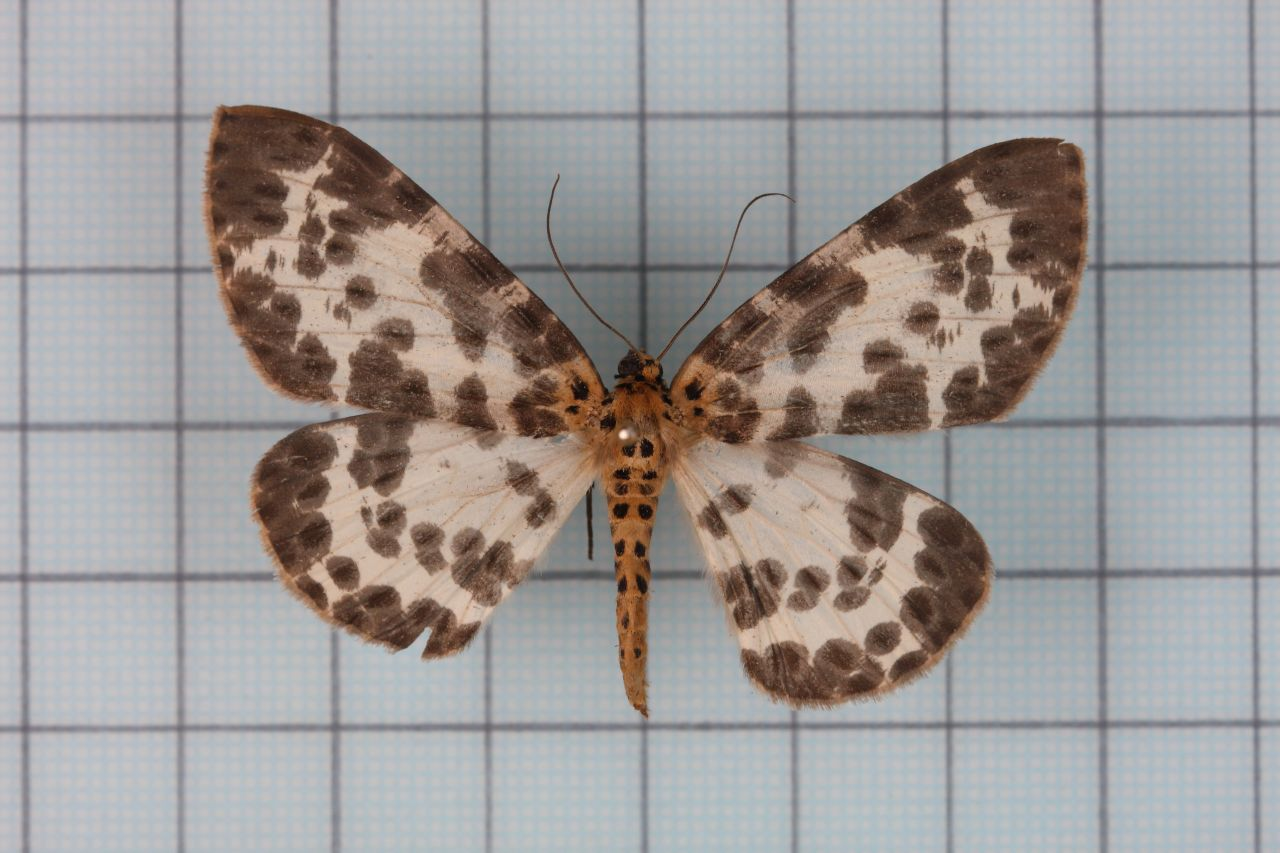
- Percnia luridaria nominoneura

Scientific classification
- Kingdom: Animalia
- Phylum: Arthropoda
- Class: Insecta
- Order: Lepidoptera
- Family: Geometridae
- Genus: Percnia
- Species: P. luridaria

Binomial name
- Percnia luridaria (Leech, 1897)

Synonyms
- Metabraxas luridaria Leech, 1897

= Percnia luridaria =

Species of moth

Percnia luridaria is a species of moth of the family Geometridae first described by John Henry Leech in 1897. It is found in Taiwan.

== Subspecies ==
- Percnia luridaria luridaria
- Percnia luridaria meridionalis Wehrli, 1939
- Percnia luridaria nominoneura Prout, 1914 (Taiwan)
