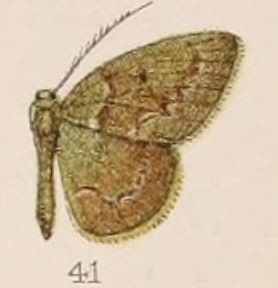

Scientific classification
- Kingdom: Animalia
- Phylum: Arthropoda
- Class: Insecta
- Order: Lepidoptera
- Family: Geometridae
- Genus: Pseudiodis
- Species: P. albidentula

Binomial name
- Pseudiodis albidentula (Hampson, 1907)

Synonyms
- Euchloris albidentula Hampson, 1907

= Pseudiodis albidentula =

Species of moth

Pseudiodis albidentula is a moth of the family Geometridae first described by George Hampson in 1907. It is found in Sri Lanka.
