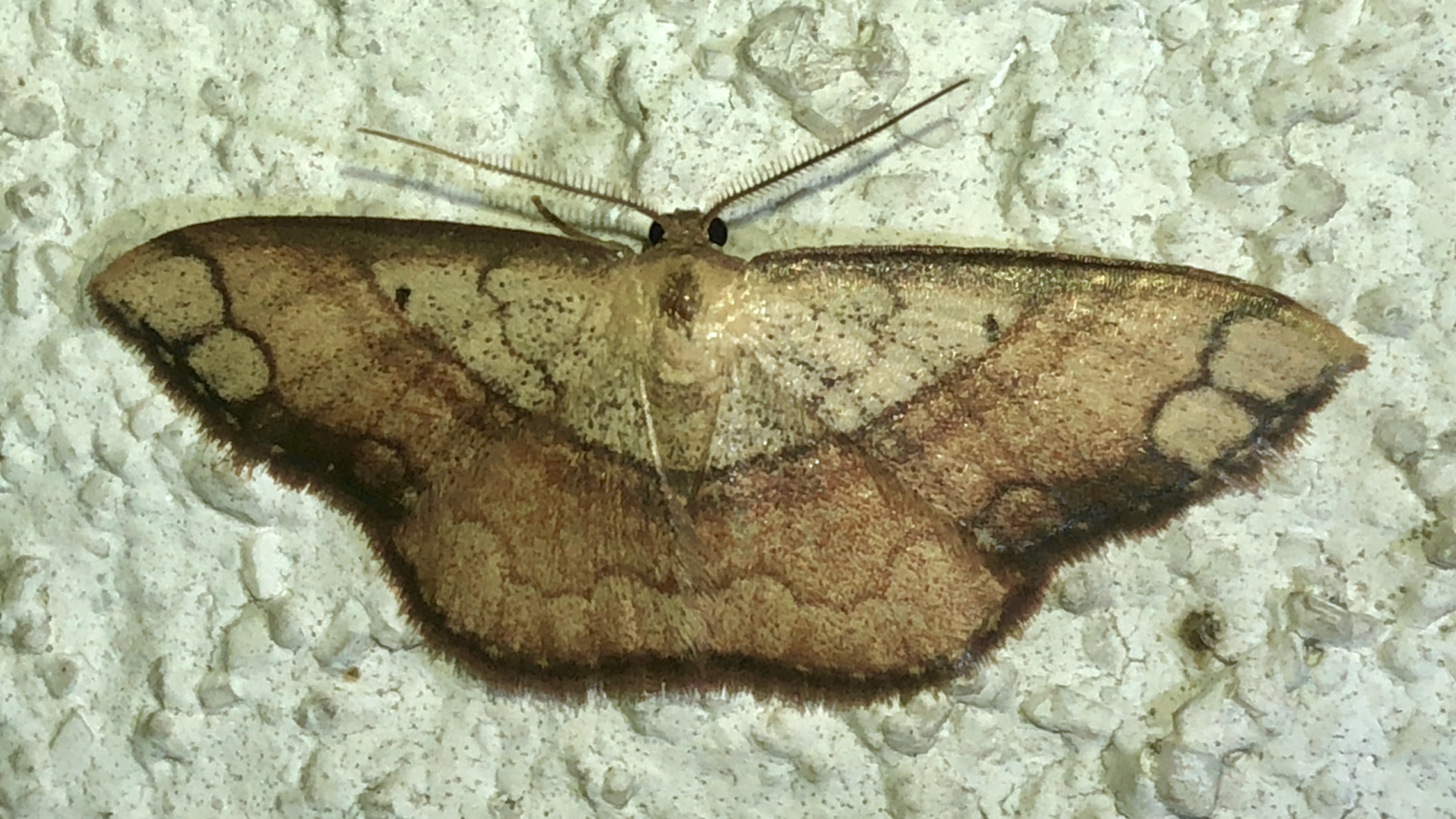

Scientific classification
- Kingdom: Animalia
- Phylum: Arthropoda
- Clade: Pancrustacea
- Class: Insecta
- Order: Lepidoptera
- Family: Geometridae
- Subfamily: Sterrhinae
- Genus: Pylargosceles; Prout, 1930

= Pylargosceles =

Genus of moths

Pylargosceles is a genus of moths in the family Geometridae. The species are main distributed in Eastern Asia, such as Korea, Japan, Taiwan, and regions of southeast China.

== Species ==
- P. limbaria Wileman, 1915
- P. steganioides Butler, 1878
