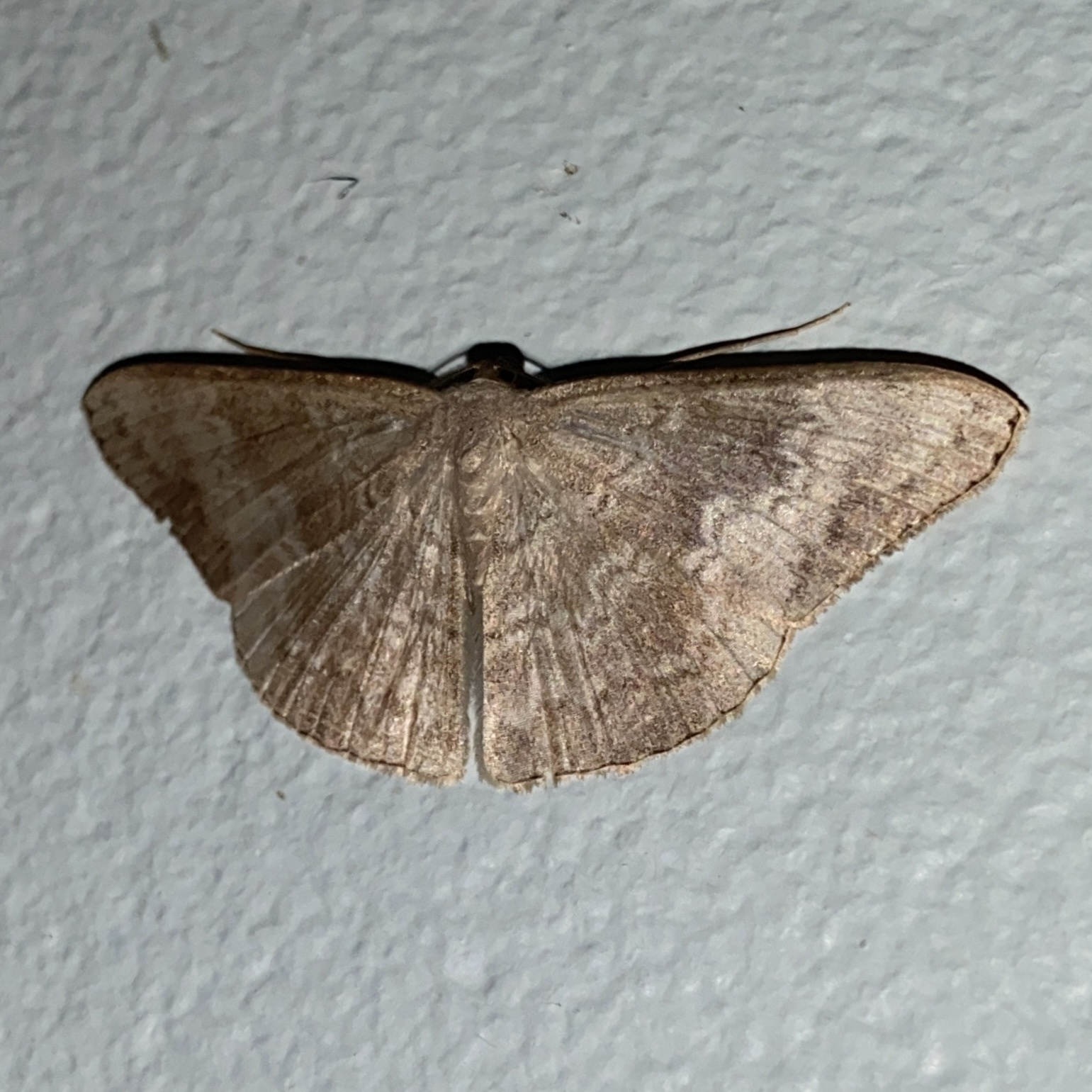
- Pycnoneura protrusilinea

Scientific classification
- Kingdom: Animalia
- Phylum: Arthropoda
- Clade: Pancrustacea
- Class: Insecta
- Order: Lepidoptera
- Family: Geometridae
- Subfamily: Oenochrominae
- Genus: Pycnoneura; Warren, 1894

= Pycnoneura =

Genus of moths

Pycnoneura is a genus of moths in the family Geometridae. It is considered by some to be a synonym of Chrysotaenia.
