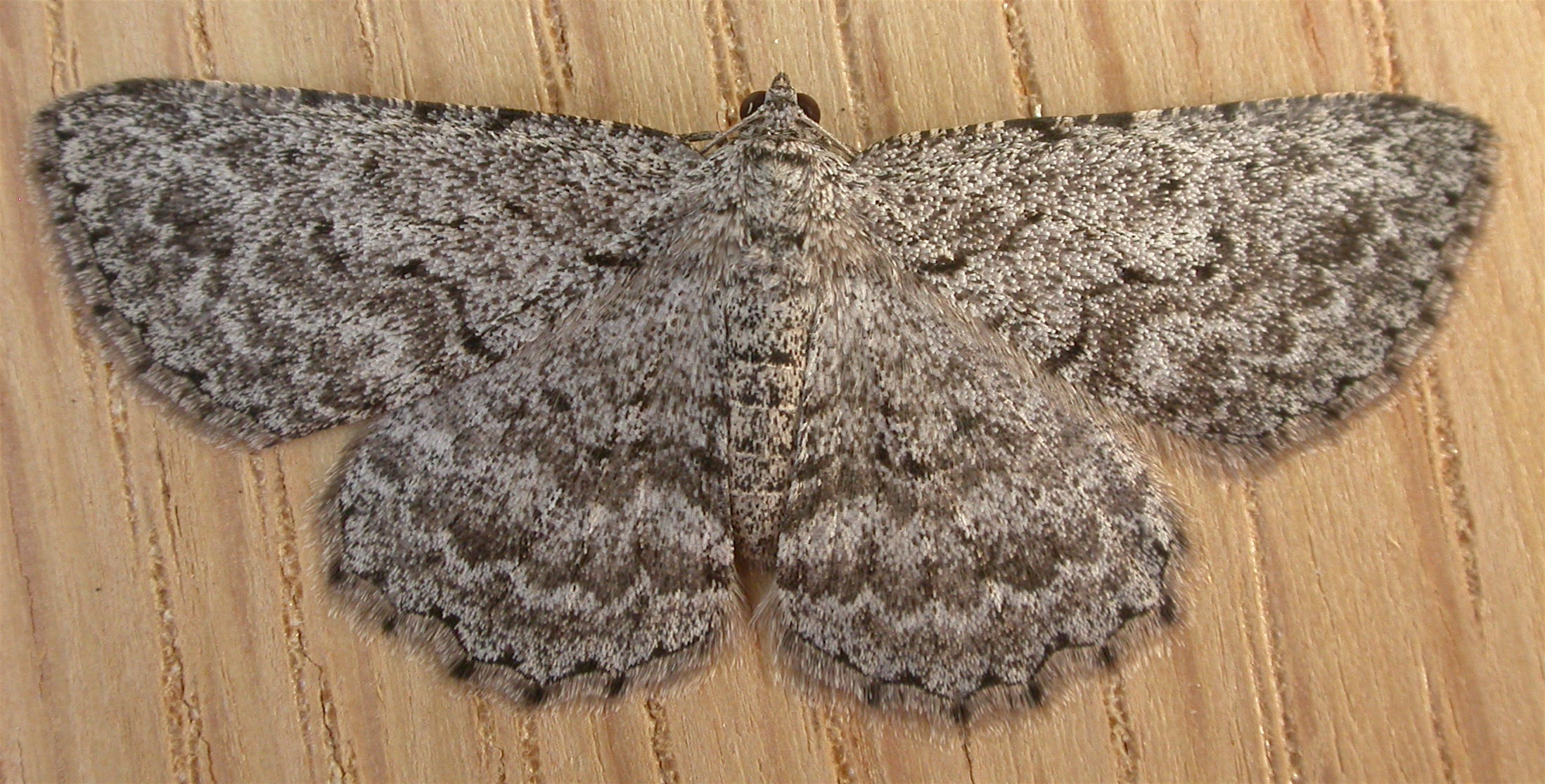
- Psilosticha absorpta

Scientific classification
- Kingdom: Animalia
- Phylum: Arthropoda
- Clade: Pancrustacea
- Class: Insecta
- Order: Lepidoptera
- Family: Geometridae
- Tribe: Boarmiini
- Genus: Psilosticha; Meyrick, 1892

= Psilosticha =

Genus of moths

Psilosticha is a genus of moths in the family Geometridae first described by Edward Meyrick in 1892.

== Species ==
The genus includes the following species:

- Psilosticha absorpta (Walker, 1860) Australia
- Psilosticha attacta (Walker, 1860) Australia
- Psilosticha loxoschema (Turner, 1947) Australia
- Psilosticha mactaria (Guenée, 1857) Australia
- Psilosticha oresitropha Turner, 1947 Australia
- Psilosticha pristis (Meyrick, 1892) Australia
