= Pigiopsis =

Scientific classification
- Kingdom: Animalia
- Phylum: Arthropoda
- Clade: Pancrustacea
- Class: Insecta
- Order: Lepidoptera
- Family: Geometridae
- Genus: Pigiopsis; Warren, 1899

Genus of moths

Pigiopsis is a genus of moths in the family Geometridae erected by Warren in 1899.

== Species ==
- Pigiopsis convergens Warren, 1899 Uganda
- Pigiopsis scotoides Prout, 1915 Cameroon
- Pigiopsis hyposcotia Prout, 1915 Cameroon
