= Planiciampa =

Scientific classification
- Kingdom: Animalia
- Phylum: Arthropoda
- Class: Insecta
- Order: Lepidoptera
- Family: Geometridae
- Genus: Planiciampa

Genus of insects

Planiciampa is a genus of moths in the family Geometridae.
