= Phibalpteryx =

Scientific classification
- Kingdom: Animalia
- Phylum: Arthropoda
- Class: Insecta
- Order: Lepidoptera
- Family: Geometridae
- Genus: Phibalpteryx; Stephens, 1829

Genus of moths

Phibalpteryx is a genus of moths in the family Geometridae.

== Species ==
- Phibalpteryx virgata (Hufnagel, 1767)
