= Paramilionia =

Scientific classification
- Kingdom: Animalia
- Phylum: Arthropoda
- Class: Insecta
- Order: Lepidoptera
- Family: Geometridae
- Subfamily: Ennominae
- Genus: Paramilionia; Bethune-Baker, 1906
- Species: P. rubroplagata

Binomial name
- Paramilionia rubroplagata Bethune-Baker, 1906

Genus of moths

Paramilionia is a monotypic moth genus in the family Geometridae. At present there is only one species in this genus: Paramilionia rubroplagata, described from Sierra Leone. Although, there are some doubts about the labels of the types and this is possibly a synonym of the South American Sangala gloriosa. Both the genus and species were first described by George Thomas Bethune-Baker in 1906.

It has a wingspan of 50 mm. The wings are blackish, with a strong deep blue metallic lustre.
