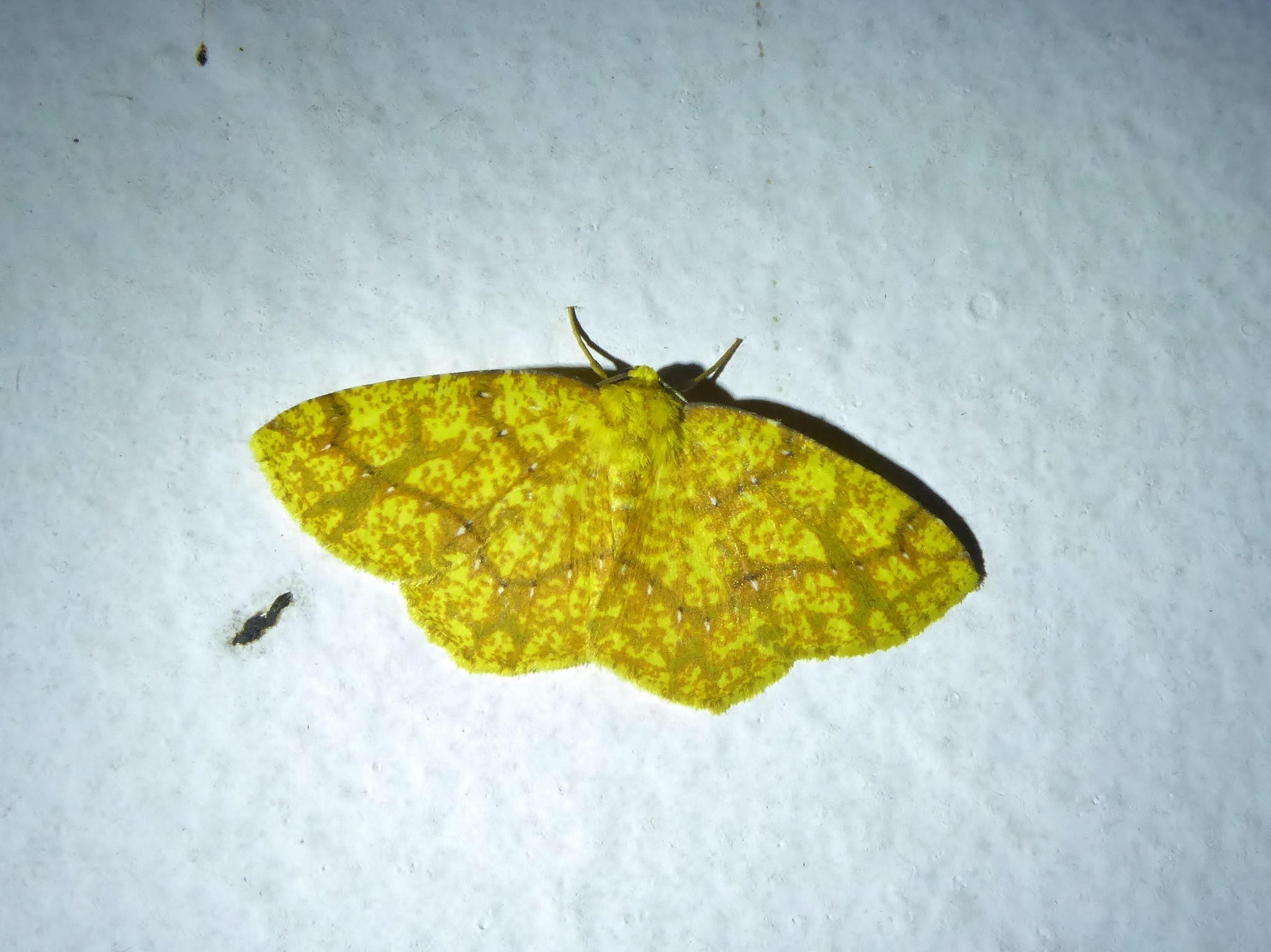
- Periclina spp.

Scientific classification
- Kingdom: Animalia
- Phylum: Arthropoda
- Clade: Pancrustacea
- Class: Insecta
- Order: Lepidoptera
- Family: Geometridae
- Genus: Periclina

= Periclina =

Genus of moths

Periclina is a genus of moths in the family Geometridae.
