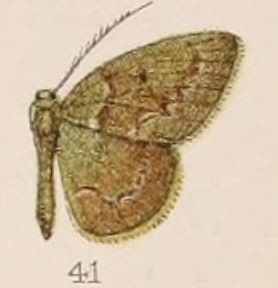

Scientific classification
- Kingdom: Animalia
- Phylum: Arthropoda
- Clade: Pancrustacea
- Class: Insecta
- Order: Lepidoptera
- Family: Geometridae
- Subfamily: Geometrinae
- Genus: Pseudiodis; Prout, 1934

= Pseudiodis =

Genus of moths

Pseudiodis is a genus of moths in the family Geometridae.

== Species ==
- Pseudiodis albidentula (Hampson 1907)
- Pseudiodis unifascia (Hampson 1891)
