= Pamphlebia =

Scientific classification
- Kingdom: Animalia
- Phylum: Arthropoda
- Class: Insecta
- Order: Lepidoptera
- Family: Geometridae
- Tribe: Hemitheini
- Genus: Pamphlebia; Warren, 1897
- Species: P. rubrolimbraria

Binomial name
- Pamphlebia rubrolimbraria (Guenée, 1857)

Synonyms
- Generic; Parachlorissa Inoue; Specific; Amaurinia rubrolimbraria Guenée, 1857; Thalassodes diserta Walker, 1861; Thalassodes simpliciaria Walker, 1861; Nemoria ruficinctaria Snellen, 1880; Pamphlebia rubrolimbaria ab. interrupta Bastelberger, 1908; Chilorocoma [sic] perigrapta Turner, 1917; Pamphlebia interrupta Prout, 1934; Parachlorissa acutangula Inoue, 1961

Genus of moths

Pamphlebia is a monotypic moth genus in the family Geometridae described by Warren in 1897. Its only species, Pamphlebia rubrolimbraria, was first described by Achille Guenée in 1857. It is found in Sri Lanka, Borneo, Indonesia, Taiwan and Australia.

The species' wingspan is 20 mm. Adults are greenish with narrow brown margins to their wings. The caterpillar is a minor pest of Oryza sativa (Asian rice).
