= Parexcelsa =

Scientific classification
- Kingdom: Animalia
- Phylum: Arthropoda
- Class: Insecta
- Order: Lepidoptera
- Family: Geometridae
- Genus: Parexcelsa; Pearsall, 1912

Genus of moths

Parexcelsa is a genus of moths in the family Geometridae described by Pearsall in 1912.
