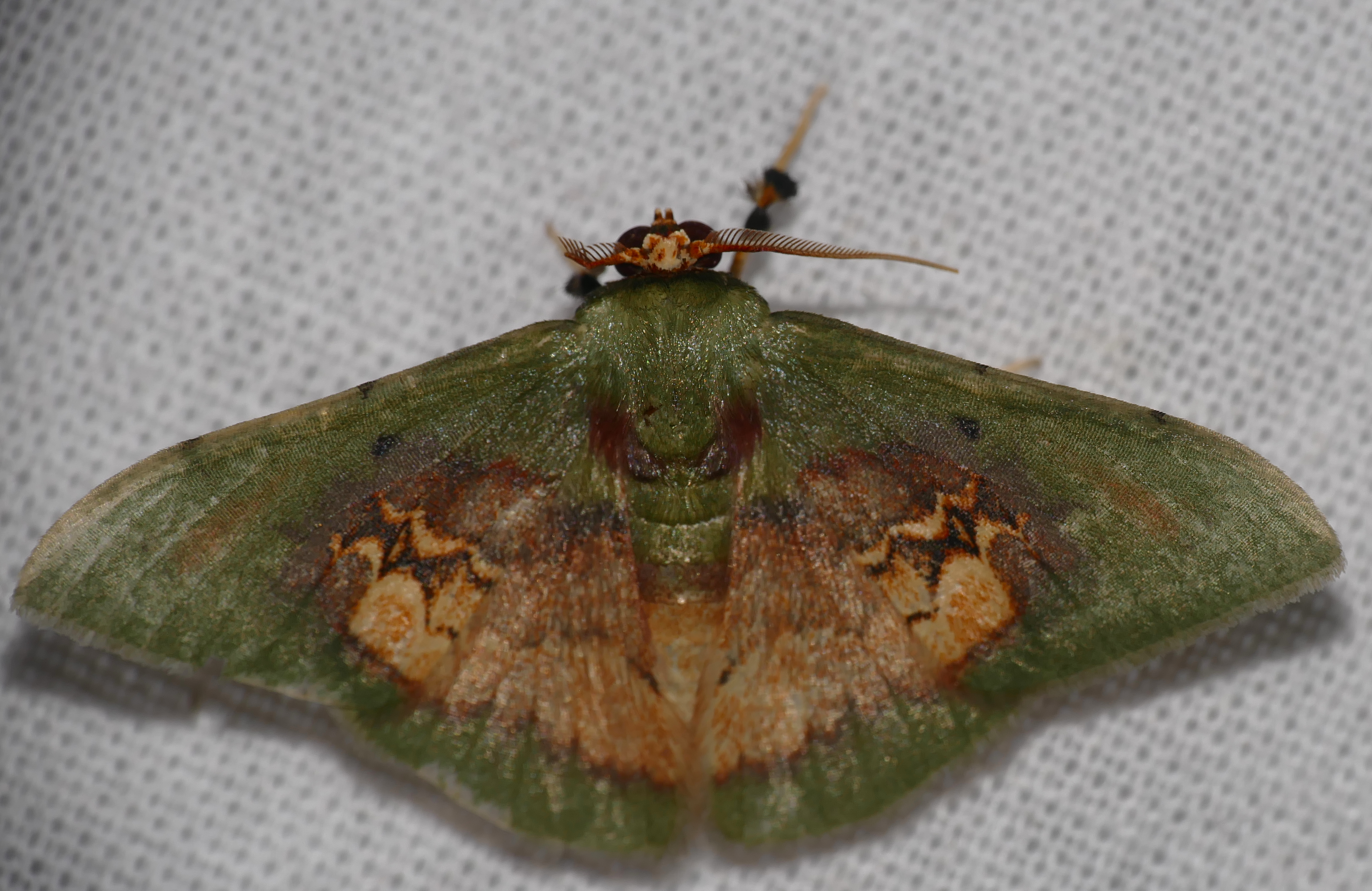
- Image of Geometrid Moth (Pyrochlora rhanis)

Scientific classification
- Kingdom: Animalia
- Phylum: Arthropoda
- Class: Insecta
- Order: Lepidoptera
- Family: Geometridae
- Genus: Pyrochlora

= Pyrochlora =

Genus of moths

Pyrochlora is a genus of moths in the family Geometridae.
