= Prometopidia =

Scientific classification
- Kingdom: Animalia
- Phylum: Arthropoda
- Clade: Pancrustacea
- Class: Insecta
- Order: Lepidoptera
- Family: Geometridae
- Subfamily: Ennominae
- Genus: Prometopidia; Hampson, 1902

Genus of insects

Prometopidia is a genus of moths in the family Geometridae, first described by George Hampson in 1902.

== Species ==
Prometopidia contains the following species:

- Prometopidia arenosa Wiltshire, 1961
- Prometopidia conisaria Hampson, 1902
- Prometopidia joshimathensis Dey, Uniyal, Hausmann & Stüning, 2021
