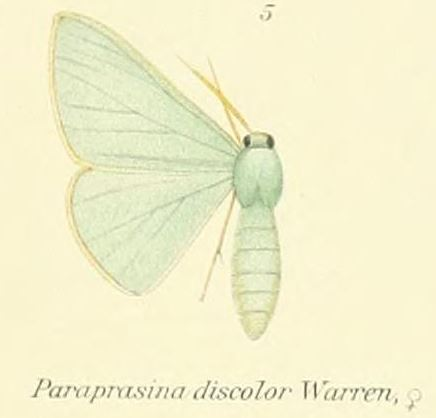

Scientific classification
- Kingdom: Animalia
- Phylum: Arthropoda
- Clade: Pancrustacea
- Class: Insecta
- Order: Lepidoptera
- Family: Geometridae
- Genus: Paraprasina; Warren, 1897
- Species: P. discolor

Binomial name
- Paraprasina discolor Warren, 1897

= Paraprasina =

Genus of moths

Paraprasina is a genus of moths in the family Geometridae. It contains a single species, Paraprasina discolor.
