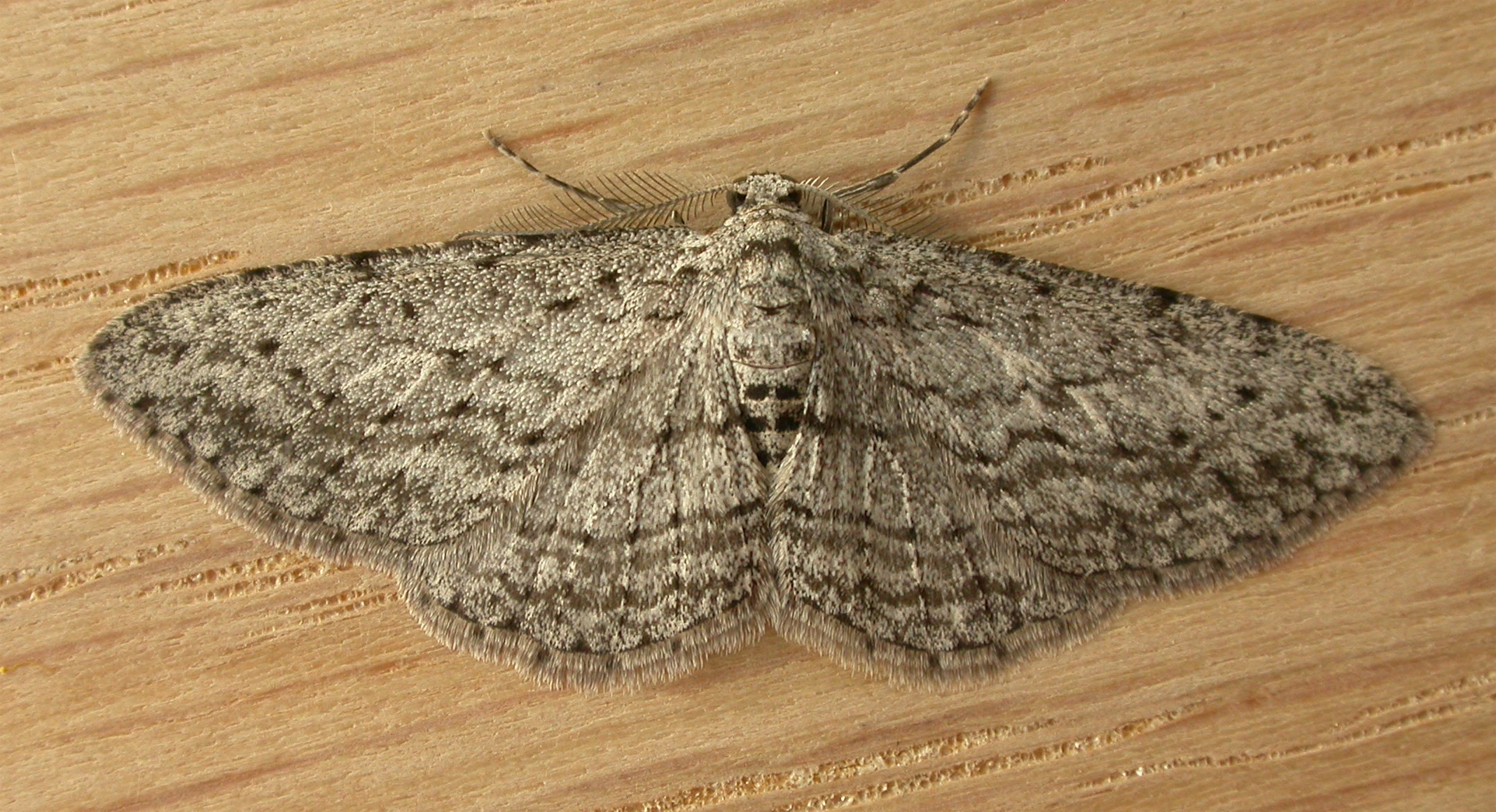

Scientific classification
- Kingdom: Animalia
- Phylum: Arthropoda
- Clade: Pancrustacea
- Class: Insecta
- Order: Lepidoptera
- Family: Geometridae
- Tribe: Boarmiini
- Genus: Phelotis; Guest, 1887
- Species: P. cognata

Binomial name
- Phelotis cognata (Walker, 1860)

Synonyms
- Boarmia cognata Walker, 1860; Acidalia tephrinaria Walker, [1863]; Boarmia tephrinaria

= Phelotis =

Genus of moths

Phelotis is a monotypic genus of moths in the family Geometridae erected by Edward Guest in 1887. Its single species, Phelotis cognata, the long-fringed bark moth, first described by Francis Walker in 1860, is found in Australia.

The wingspan is about 26 mm for males and about 30 mm for females.

The larvae feed on Exocarpus species, but is thought that it has other food plants too.
