= Pimaphera =

Scientific classification
- Kingdom: Animalia
- Phylum: Arthropoda
- Class: Insecta
- Order: Lepidoptera
- Family: Geometridae
- Tribe: Boarmiini
- Genus: Pimaphera; Cassino & Swett, 1927

Genus of moths

Pimaphera is a genus of moths in the family Geometridae. The genus was erected by Samuel E. Cassino and Louis W. Swett in 1927.

== Species ==
- Pimaphera percata Cassino & Swett, 1927
- Pimaphera sparsaria (Walker, 1863)
