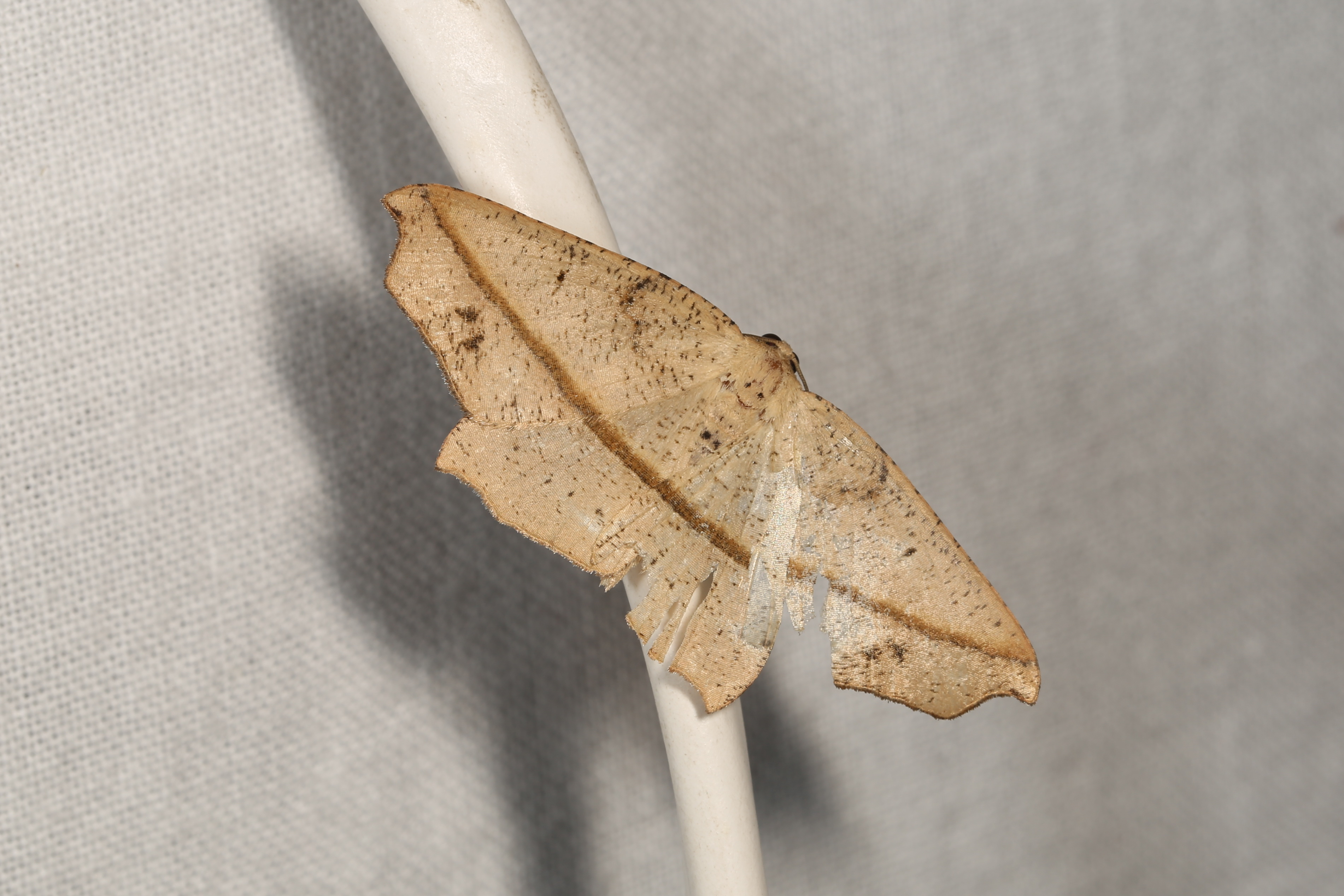
- Picrophylla hyleora Turner, 1922, to actinic light, Lamington National Park, Queensland Australia, 23 May 2017

Scientific classification
- Kingdom: Animalia
- Phylum: Arthropoda
- Clade: Pancrustacea
- Class: Insecta
- Order: Lepidoptera
- Family: Geometridae
- Genus: Picrophylla

= Picrophylla =

Genus of moths

Picrophylla is a genus of moths in the family Geometridae.
