= Peridela =

Scientific classification
- Kingdom: Animalia
- Phylum: Arthropoda
- Clade: Pancrustacea
- Class: Insecta
- Order: Lepidoptera
- Family: Geometridae
- Genus: Peridela

Genus of moths

Peridela is a genus of moths in the family Geometridae. It belong to class of insect.
