= Proutoscia =

Proutoscia mirifica

Scientific classification
- Kingdom: Animalia
- Phylum: Arthropoda
- Clade: Pancrustacea
- Class: Insecta
- Order: Lepidoptera
- Family: Geometridae
- Genus: Proutoscia; Schaus, 1912
- Species: P. mirifica

Binomial name
- Proutoscia mirifica Schaus, 1912

Genus of moths

Proutoscia is a genus of moths in the family Geometridae. It is monotypic, being represented by the single species Proutoscia mirifica.
