= Plesiophyle =

Scientific classification
- Kingdom: Animalia
- Phylum: Arthropoda
- Clade: Pancrustacea
- Class: Insecta
- Order: Lepidoptera
- Family: Geometridae
- Genus: Plesiophyle

Genus of moths

Plesiophyle is a genus of moths in the family Geometridae. (Common names: inchworms or geometer moth)

Inchworm is the larva (caterpillar) of a moth in the family Geometridae that becomes a species of Geometer Moths after complete metamorphosis.
