= Petrodava =

Scientific classification
- Kingdom: Animalia
- Phylum: Arthropoda
- Class: Insecta
- Order: Lepidoptera
- Family: Geometridae
- Tribe: Caberini
- Genus: Petrodava

Genus of moths

Petrodava is a genus of moths in the family Geometridae.
