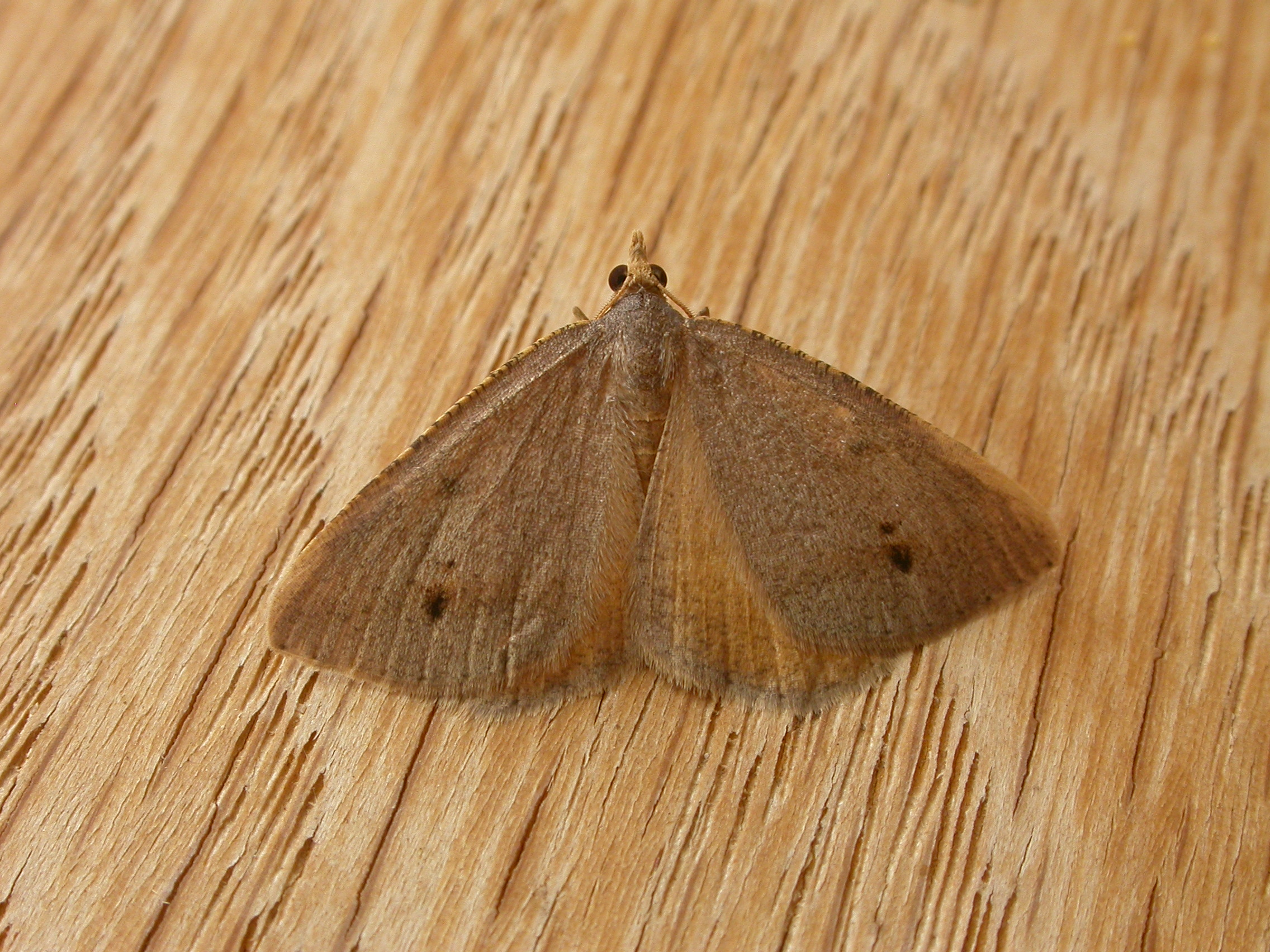

Scientific classification
- Kingdom: Animalia
- Phylum: Arthropoda
- Clade: Pancrustacea
- Class: Insecta
- Order: Lepidoptera
- Family: Geometridae
- Genus: Parosteodes; Warren, 1895
- Species: P. fictiliaria

Binomial name
- Parosteodes fictiliaria (Guenée, 1857)

Synonyms
- Panagra fictiliaria Guenée, 1857; Aspilates dissutata Walker, 1862; Tephrina procurata Walker, 1861; Panagra ferritinctaria Walker, 1861; Tephrinopsis plana Warren, 1898

= Parosteodes =

Genus of moths

Parosteodes is a monotypic genus of moths in the family Geometridae described by Warren in 1895. Its only species, Parosteodes fictiliaria, the dodonaea moth, was first described by Achille Guenée in 1857. It is found in Australia (Lord Howe Island, New South Wales, Queensland, South Australia, Tasmania and Victoria).

The wingspan is about 20 mm.
