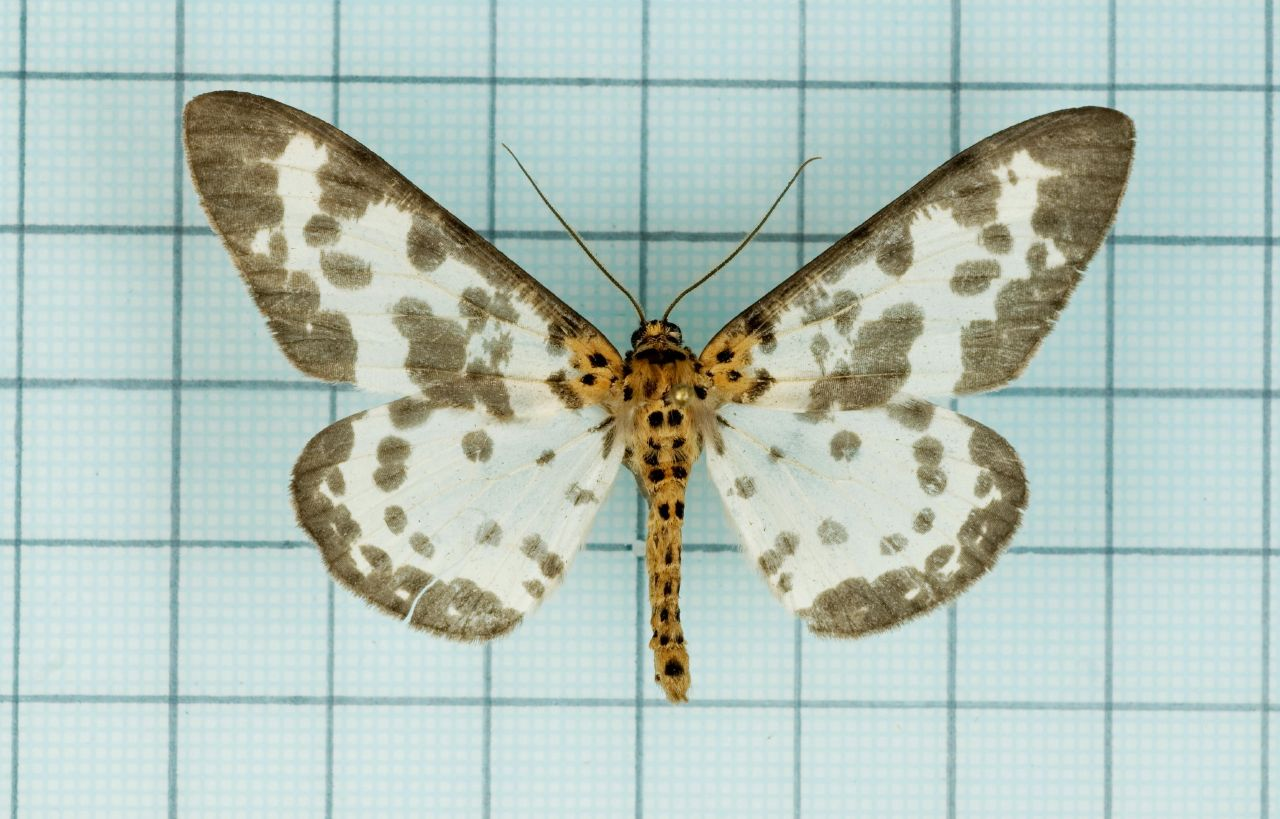
- Percnia longitermen

Scientific classification
- Domain: Eukaryota
- Kingdom: Animalia
- Phylum: Arthropoda
- Class: Insecta
- Order: Lepidoptera
- Family: Geometridae
- Subfamily: Ennominae
- Genus: Percnia; Guenee, 1857

= Percnia =

Genus of moths

Percnia is a genus of moths in the family Geometridae.

== Species ==
The following species are recognised in the genus Percnia:

- Percnia albinigrata Warren, 1896
- Percnia belluaria Guenée, 1858
- Percnia confusa Warren, 1894
- Percnia contrasqualida Inoue, 1992
- Percnia cordiforma Inoue, 1978
- Percnia ductaria Walker, 1862
- Percnia felinaria Guenee, 1858
- Percnia foraria Guenee, 1858
- Percnia fumidaria Leech, 1897
- Percnia giraffata Guenée, 1858
- Percnia grisearia Leech, 1897
- Percnia interfusa Warren, 1893
- Percnia longitermen Prout, 1914
- Percnia luridaria (Leech, 1897)
- Percnia maculata Moore, 1867
- Percnia prouti (Wehrli, 1925)
- Percnia suffusa Wileman, 1914
- BOLD:AAZ6058 (Percnia sp.)
