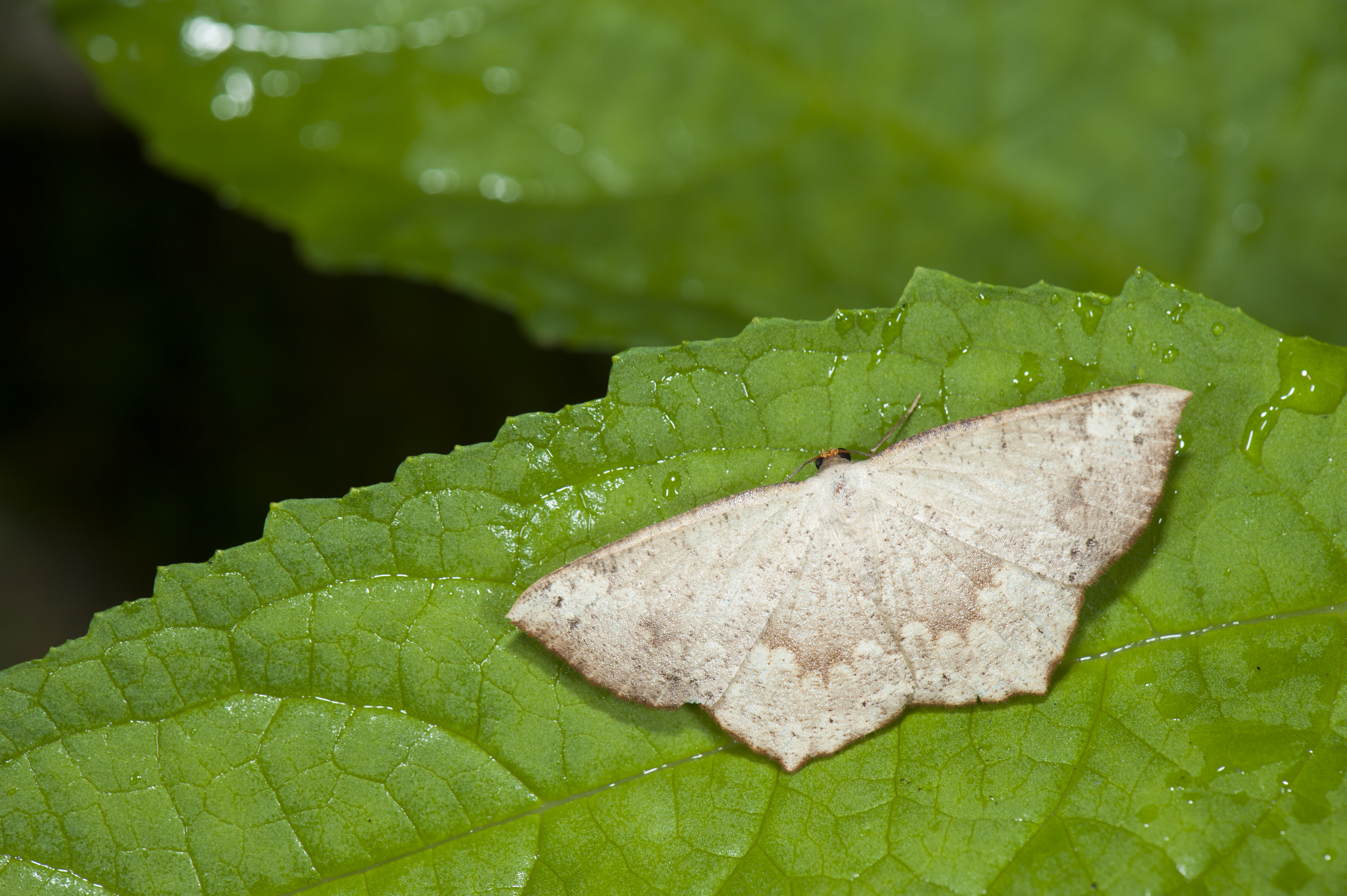
- Peratostega deletaria

Scientific classification
- Kingdom: Animalia
- Phylum: Arthropoda
- Clade: Pancrustacea
- Class: Insecta
- Order: Lepidoptera
- Family: Geometridae
- Genus: Peratostega; Warren, 1897

= Peratostega =

Genus of moths

Peratostega is a genus of moths in the family Geometridae first described by Warren in 1897.

== Species ==
- Peratostega deletaria (Moore)
- Peratostega indistincta (Moore, 1888)
- Peratostega coctata Warren, 1897
- Peratostega punctapex Holloway, 1993
