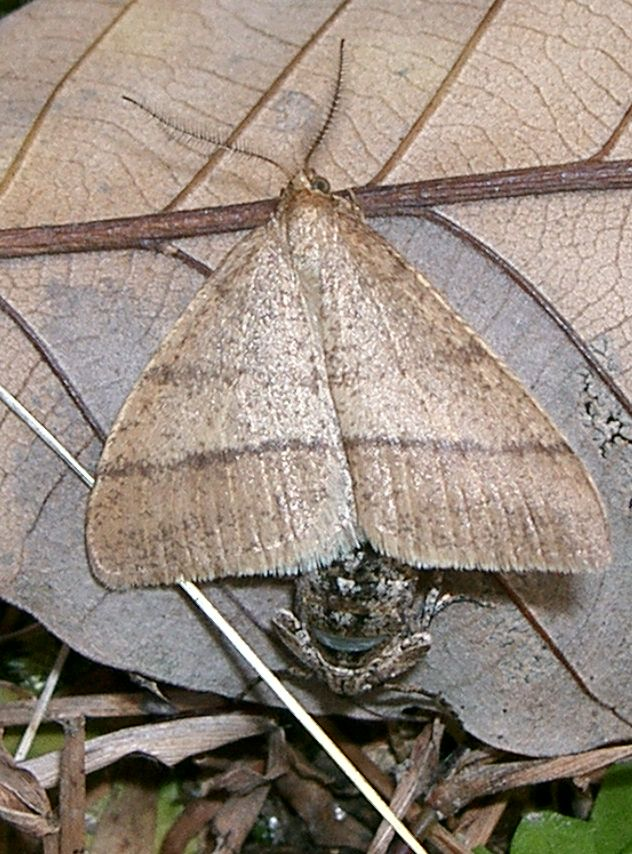
- Mating Pachyerannis obliquaria - large-winged male above, stub-winged female below

Scientific classification
- Kingdom: Animalia
- Phylum: Arthropoda
- Class: Insecta
- Order: Lepidoptera
- Family: Geometridae
- Subfamily: Ennominae
- Tribe: Bistonini; Stephens, 1850

Genera
- See text

Synonyms
- Amphidasini Duponchel, 1845; Amphidasites Duponchel, 1845; Bistonidi Stephens, 1850; Eubyjinae Warren, 1893; Eubyjini Warren, 1893; Hibernites Duponchel, 1845; Hyberniini Duponchel, 1845

= Bistonini =

Tribe of geometer moths

The Bistonini are a tribe of geometer moths in subfamily Ennominae. As numerous ennomine genera have not yet been assigned to a tribe, the genus list is preliminary. In addition, the entire tribe is sometimes merged into a much-expanded Boarmiini. In other treatments, the Erannini are included in the present group.

They overall resemble the Boarmiini, which are certainly closely related. Bistonini tend to retain more plesiomorphic traits (they are rather basal in the expanded Boarmiini) and contain many species that are very large and hairy by geometer moth standards, somewhat resembling Arctiidae.

== Selected genera and species ==
- Agriopis
  - Spring usher, Agriopis leucophaearia
  - Dotted border, Agriopis marginaria
- Almabiston
- Amorphogynia
- Apocheima
- Biston
- Chondrosoma
- Cochisea
- Hypagyrtis
- Larerannis
- Lycia
  - Brindled beauty, Lycia hirtaria
- Megabiston
- Microbiston
- Nyssiodes
- Pachyerannis
- Paleacrita
  - Spring cankerworm, Paleacrita vernata
- Phigaliohybernia
- Protalcis
- Pterotocera
