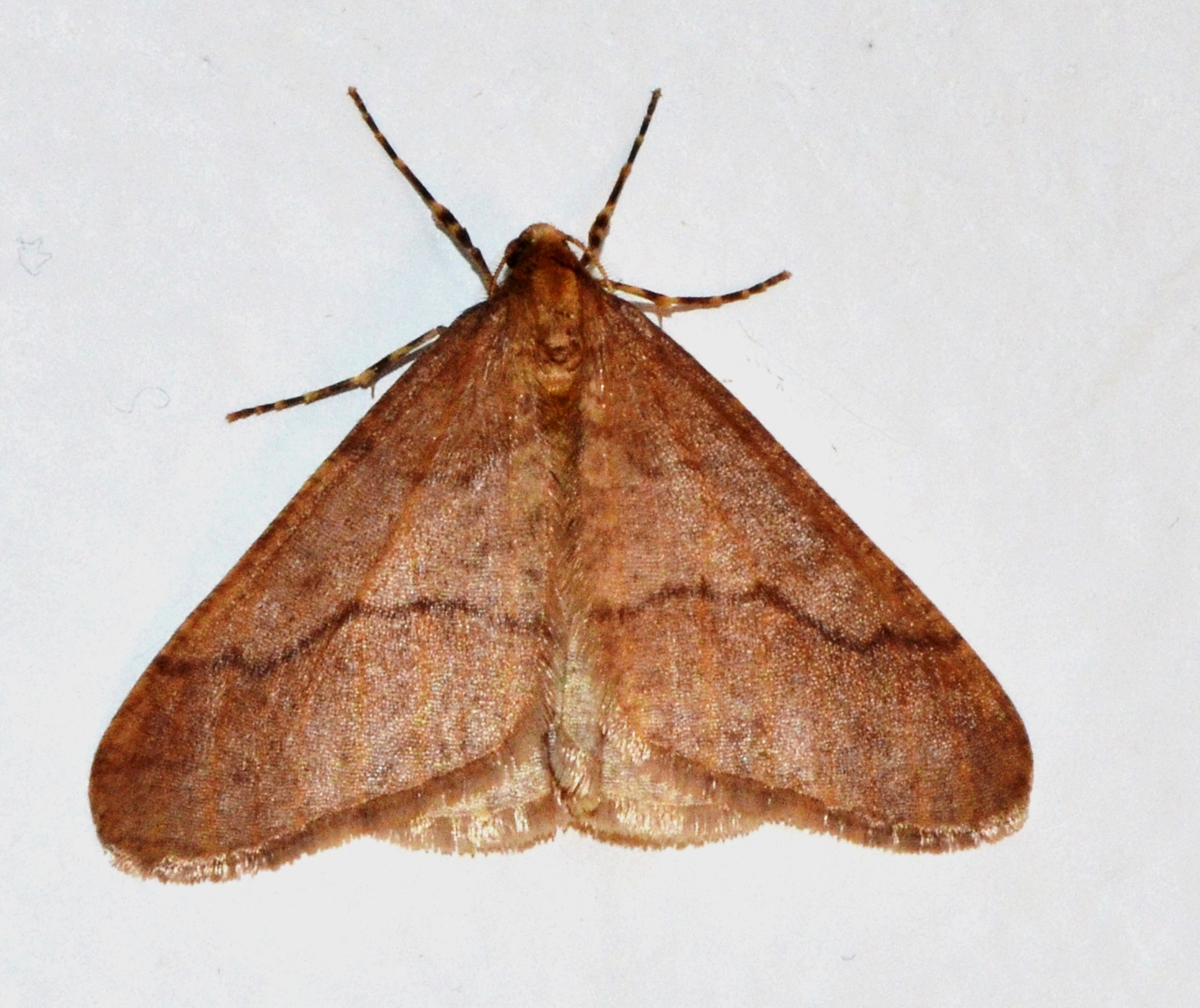

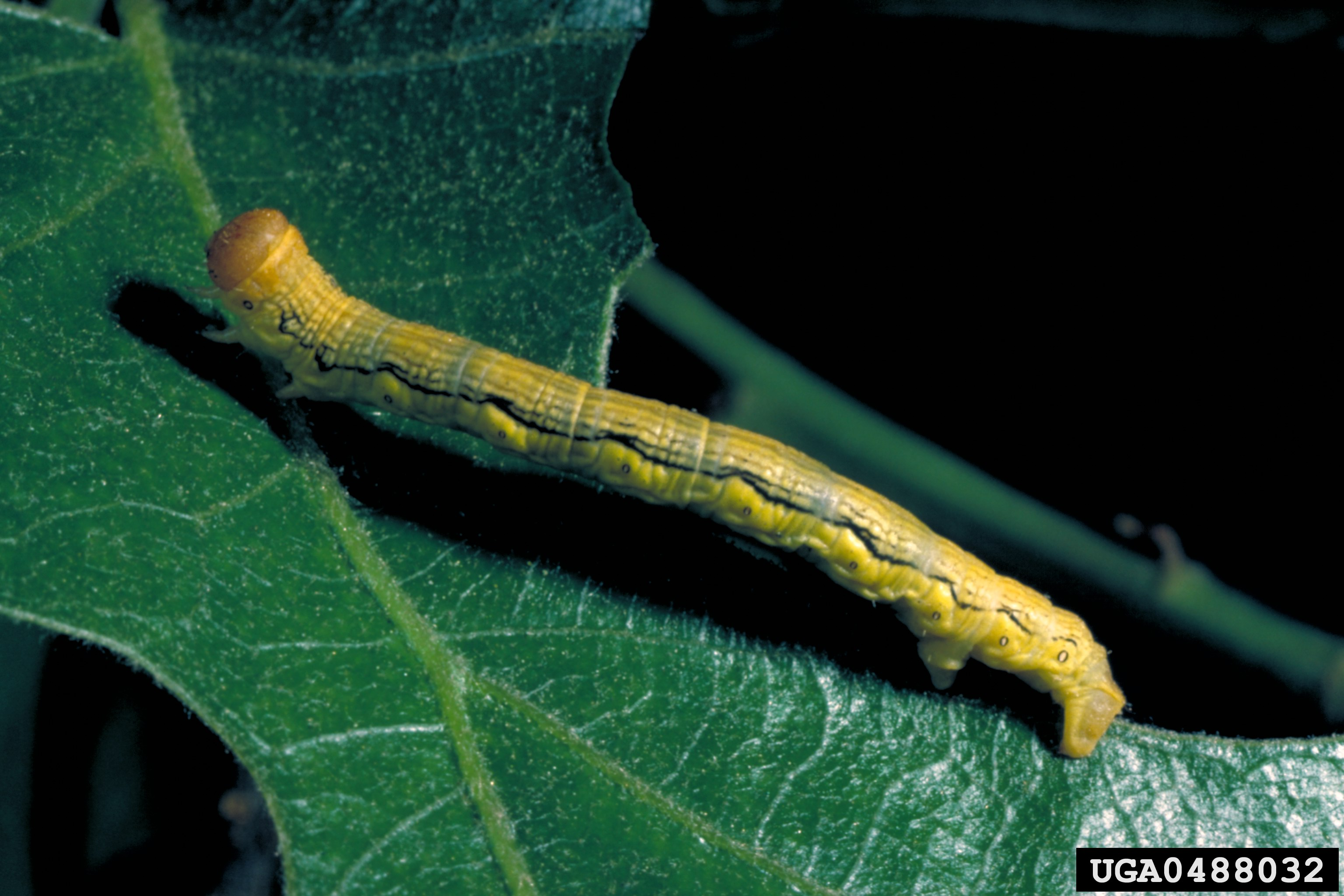
- Adult (top) and larva (bottom)

Scientific classification
- Kingdom: Animalia
- Phylum: Arthropoda
- Class: Insecta
- Order: Lepidoptera
- Family: Geometridae
- Genus: Erannis
- Species: E. tiliaria

Binomial name
- Erannis tiliaria (Harris, 1841)

= Erannis tiliaria =

Species of moth

Erannis tiliaria, the linden looper, also known under the rather ambiguous name "winter moth", is a moth of the family Geometridae. The species was first described by Thaddeus William Harris in 1841. It is found in North America from central Alberta east to Nova Scotia, south to Missouri, Georgia, Utah and Texas.

Erannis vancouverensis was considered to be a subspecies of E. tiliaria for some time, but appears to be a separate species.

The wingspan is 32–42 mm for males. Females are wingless. Adult males are on wing in late fall.

The larvae feed on various deciduous trees and shrubs, including basswood, apple, ash, beech, birch, elm, maple, oak, poplar, Prunus and Ribes.
