= Cochisea recisa =

Scientific classification
- Kingdom: Animalia
- Phylum: Arthropoda
- Class: Insecta
- Order: Lepidoptera
- Family: Geometridae
- Tribe: Bistonini
- Genus: Cochisea
- Species: C. recisa

Binomial name
- Cochisea recisa Rindge, 1975

Species of moth

Cochisea recisa is a species of geometrid moth in the family Geometridae. It is found in North America.

The MONA or Hodges number for Cochisea recisa is 6648.
