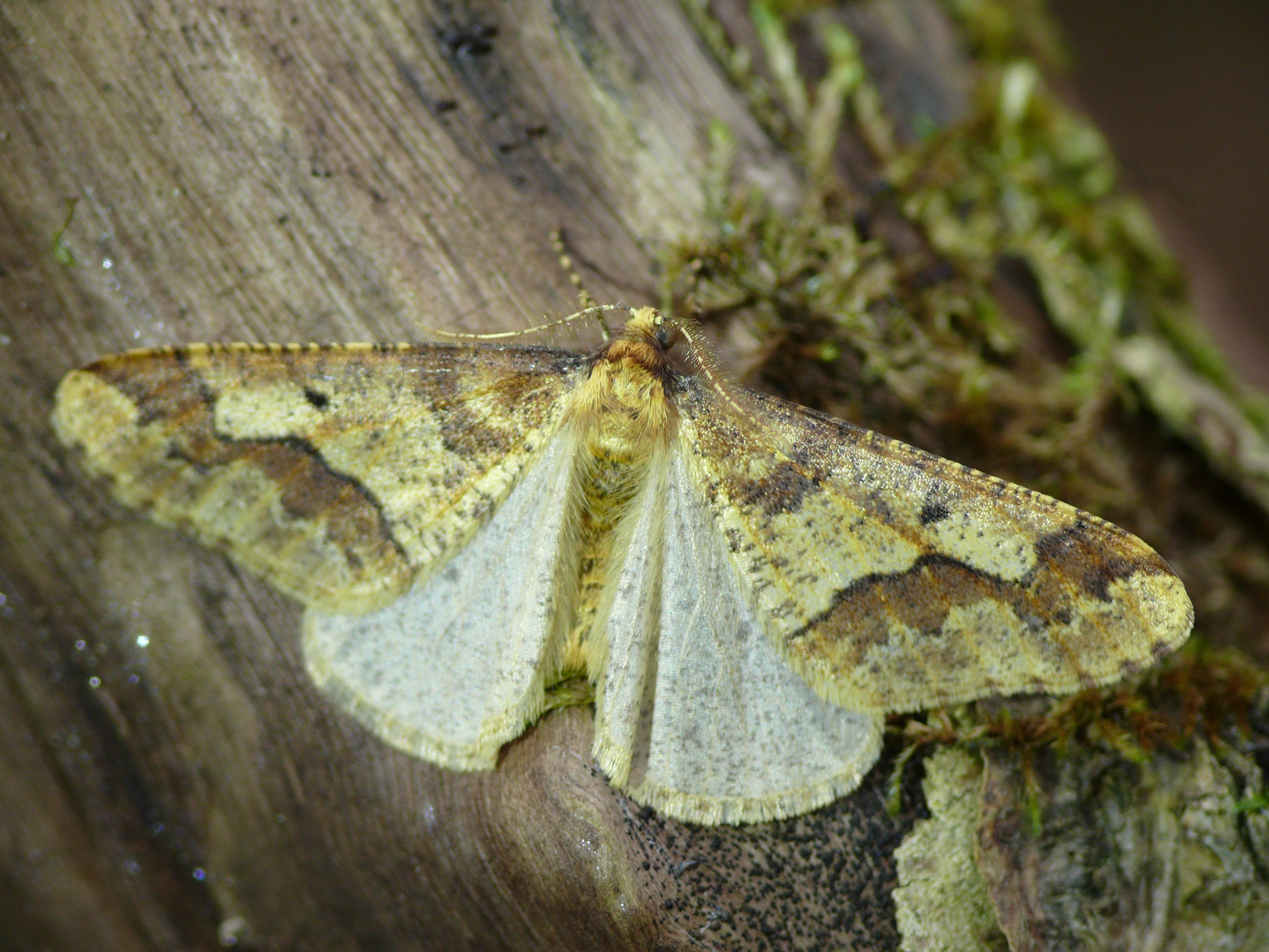
- Male mottled umber (Erannis defoliaria)

Scientific classification
- Kingdom: Animalia
- Phylum: Arthropoda
- Class: Insecta
- Order: Lepidoptera
- Family: Geometridae
- Subfamily: Ennominae
- Tribe: Erannini (?)
- Genus: Erannis; Hübner, [1825]

Type species
- Phalaena defoliaria Clerck, 1759

Diversity
- About 12 described species

Synonyms
- List: Chimadia Speyer, 1839; Erranis (lapsus); Hibernia (lapsus); Hyberna (lapsus); Hybernia Berthold, 1827; Lampetia Stephens, 1827; Thriptera Gistel, 1848

= Erannis =

Genus of moths

Erannis is a genus of geometer moths in the subfamily Ennominae erected by Jacob Hübner in 1825. It is placed by some entomologists in the tribe Erannini as the type genus, but others merge this group into the tribe Boarmiini or Bistonini.

The adults of these smallish moths typically live in the crowns of their host trees. The genus is most diverse in the Holarctic; few of the twelve or so known species occur in adjacent regions.

== Species ==
The following species are recognised in the genus Erannis:

- Erannis ankeraria (Staudinger, 1861)
- Erannis caspica László, 2003
- Erannis declinans (Staudinger, 1879)
- Erannis defoliaria (Clerck, 1759) – mottled umber
- Erannis erectaria (Püngeler, 1902)
- Erannis golda Djakonov, 1929
- Erannis jacobsoni Djakonov, 1926
- Erannis kashmirensis László, 2003
- Erannis occataria Erschoff, 1874
- Erannis potopolskii Viidalepp, 1988
- Erannis tiliaria (Harris, 1841) – linden looper, winter moth
- Erannis vancouverensis Hulst, 1896 (sometimes in E. tiliaria)
