= Paleacrita longiciliata =

Scientific classification
- Kingdom: Animalia
- Phylum: Arthropoda
- Clade: Pancrustacea
- Class: Insecta
- Order: Lepidoptera
- Family: Geometridae
- Genus: Paleacrita
- Species: P. longiciliata

Binomial name
- Paleacrita longiciliata Hulst, 1898

Species of moth

Paleacrita longiciliata is a species of geometrid moth in the family Geometridae. It is found in North America.
