= Almabiston =

Scientific classification
- Kingdom: Animalia
- Phylum: Arthropoda
- Class: Insecta
- Order: Lepidoptera
- Family: Geometridae
- Tribe: Bistonini
- Genus: Almabiston; Djakonov, 1952

Genus of geometer moths

Almabiston is a genus of moths in the family Geometridae.

== Species ==
- Almabiston brunneum Djakonov, 1952
