= William Dandridge Peck =

American entomologist (1763–1822)

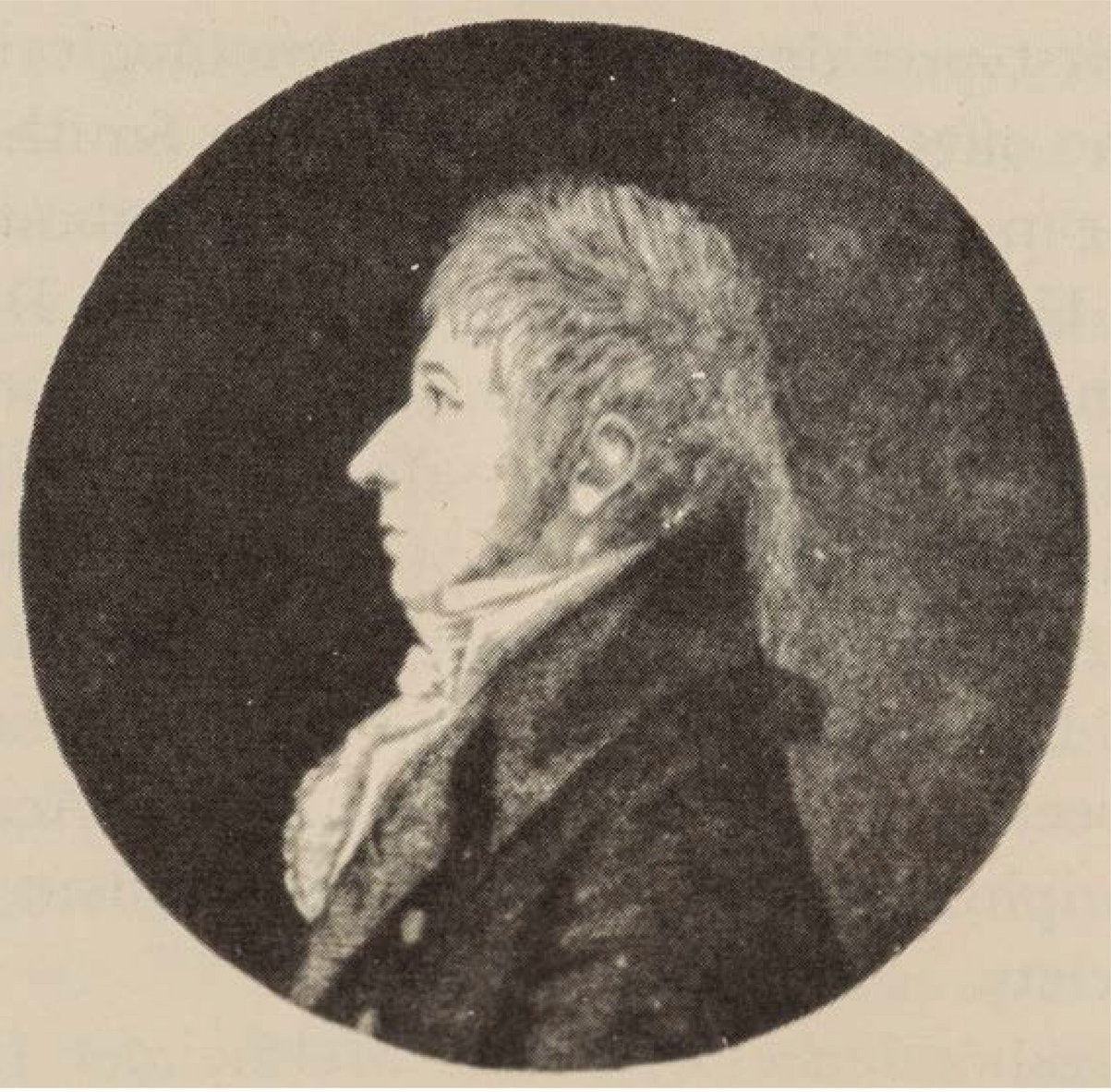

William Dandridge Peck (May 8, 1763 – October 8, 1822) was an American naturalist, the first American-born entomologist and a pioneer in the field of economic entomology. In 1806 he became the first professor of natural history at Harvard, a position he held until his death in 1822.

== Biography ==
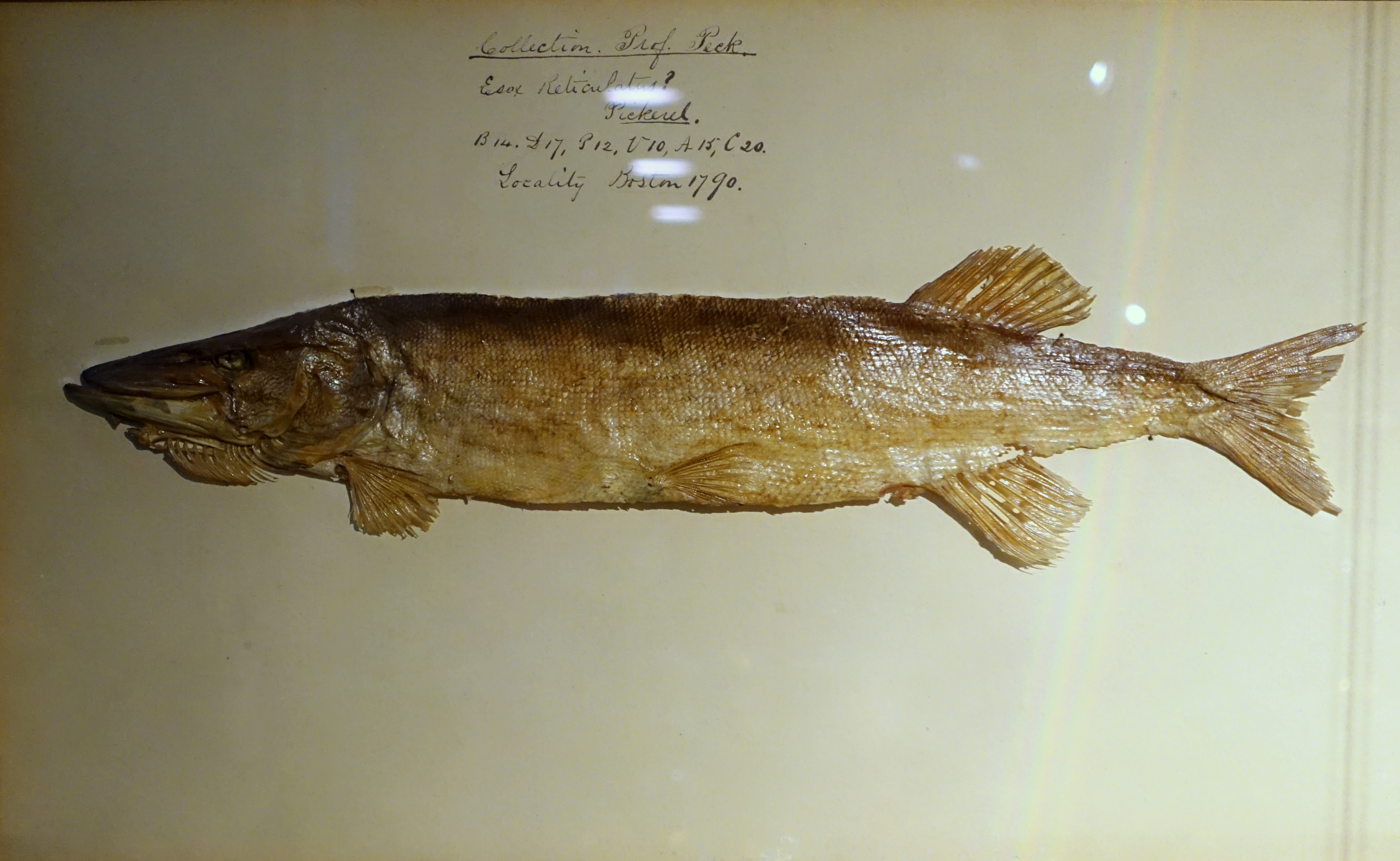
Mounted pickerel, collected from the Charles River, Boston, 1790, by William Dandridge Peck

Peck was born in Boston on May 8, 1763, the son of John Peck, a noted naval architect, and his wife Hannah Jackson. His mother died when he was seven years old. In 1782 he graduated from Harvard College and though he aspired to become a physician, his father encouraged him to enter business. Peck was unhappy with his occupation and eventually moved to Kittery, Maine where he lived with his father on a small coastal farm.

Peck lived as a recluse on the farm for twenty years, only occasionally leaving to visit friends in Boston. He also suffered bouts of severe depression. Despite his isolation and disability, he studied natural history and became adept in botany, entomology, ornithology and ichthyology. He amassed a good collection of insects, aquatic plants and fishes and studied them with a microscope he built himself. He later claimed that he had first become interested in natural history after picking up a copy of Linnaeus' Systema Naturae at the site of a shipwreck on the coast.

In 1794 Peck published Description of Four Remarkable Fishes..., the first American taxonomic paper on zoology. In 1795 he began writing on entomology and in 1796 he won a prize from the Massachusetts Society for Promoting Agriculture for his paper on the natural history of the cankerworm, Phalaena vernata. Additional works on entomology followed, often accompanied by his own illustrations which demonstrated an aptitude for drawing. He also developed a correspondence with William Kirby, a noted English entomologist, and sent him many insect specimens. In 1796, Peck was elected a member of the American Philosophical Society.

His scientific work brought Peck a measure of fame and in 1805 he was appointed Harvard's first professor of natural history. In addition to teaching, he was expected to establish a botanic garden at the college. In preparation for his new duties he was sent to Europe for three years where he studied in Sweden, France, and England. He served as professor until his death in 1822. One of his students was Thaddeus William Harris, who became a highly regarded economic entomologist.

Peck was elected a fellow of the American Academy of Arts and Sciences in 1793 and became a founding member of the American Antiquarian Society in 1812, serving as the society's first vice-president from 1812 to 1816. After settling in Cambridge, Peck married and had a son, also named William Dandridge Peck (1812–1876), who became a physician and state legislator.

Later in life Peck suffered a series of strokes that left him severely debilitated. Just before he died, Peck had another stroke that left him unable to speak so he penned a final request, "no funeral, no eulogy".

== Works ==
Peck was never a prolific author. His writings focused on insects as agricultural pests and were published in farm periodicals. Some of his notable papers include:

- The description and history of the cankerworm. (1795)
- Natural history of the slugworm. (1799)
- Important communication relative to the cankerworm. (1816)
- On the insects which destroy the young branches of the pear tree... (1817)
- Some notice of the insect which destroys the locust tree. (1818)
- Insects which affect the oak and cherries. (1819)

== Taxon described by him ==
- See Category:Taxa named by William Dandridge Peck
