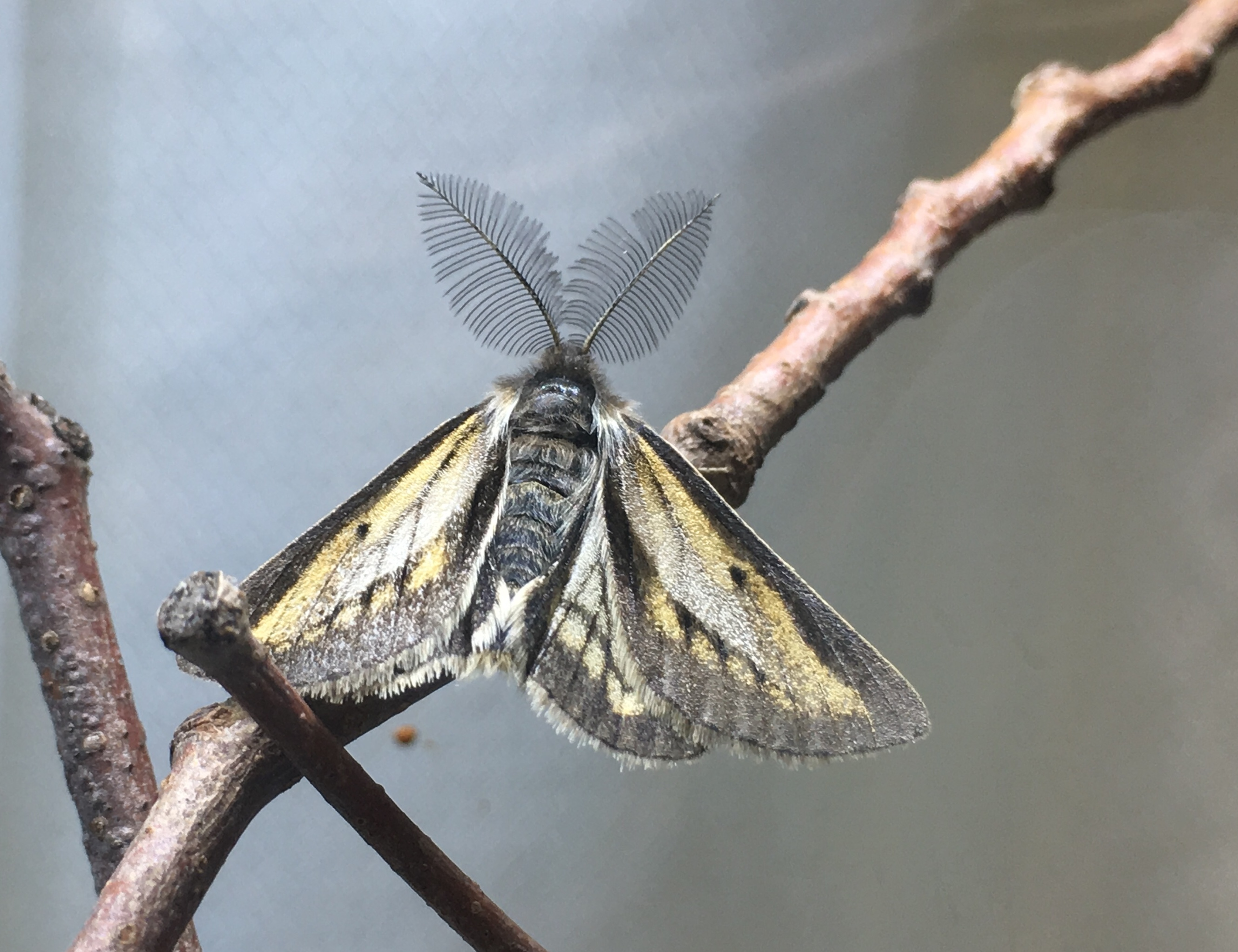
- Nyssiodes lefuarius

Scientific classification
- Domain: Eukaryota
- Kingdom: Animalia
- Phylum: Arthropoda
- Class: Insecta
- Order: Lepidoptera
- Family: Geometridae
- Tribe: Bistonini
- Genus: Nyssiodes; Oberthur, 1880

= Nyssiodes =

Genus of moths

Nyssiodes is a genus of moth in the family Geometridae.

== Species ==
- Nyssiodes koreanus Kemal & Kocak, 2004 (=Nyssiodes ochraceus Kim & Shin, 1995)
- Nyssiodes lefuarius (Erschoff, 1872)
- Nyssiodes ochraceus Wehrli, 1923
- Nyssiodes rhodopolitis Wehrli, 1939

== Status unclear ==
- Nyssiodes perochrea Wehrli, 1941 (Nomen nudum)
