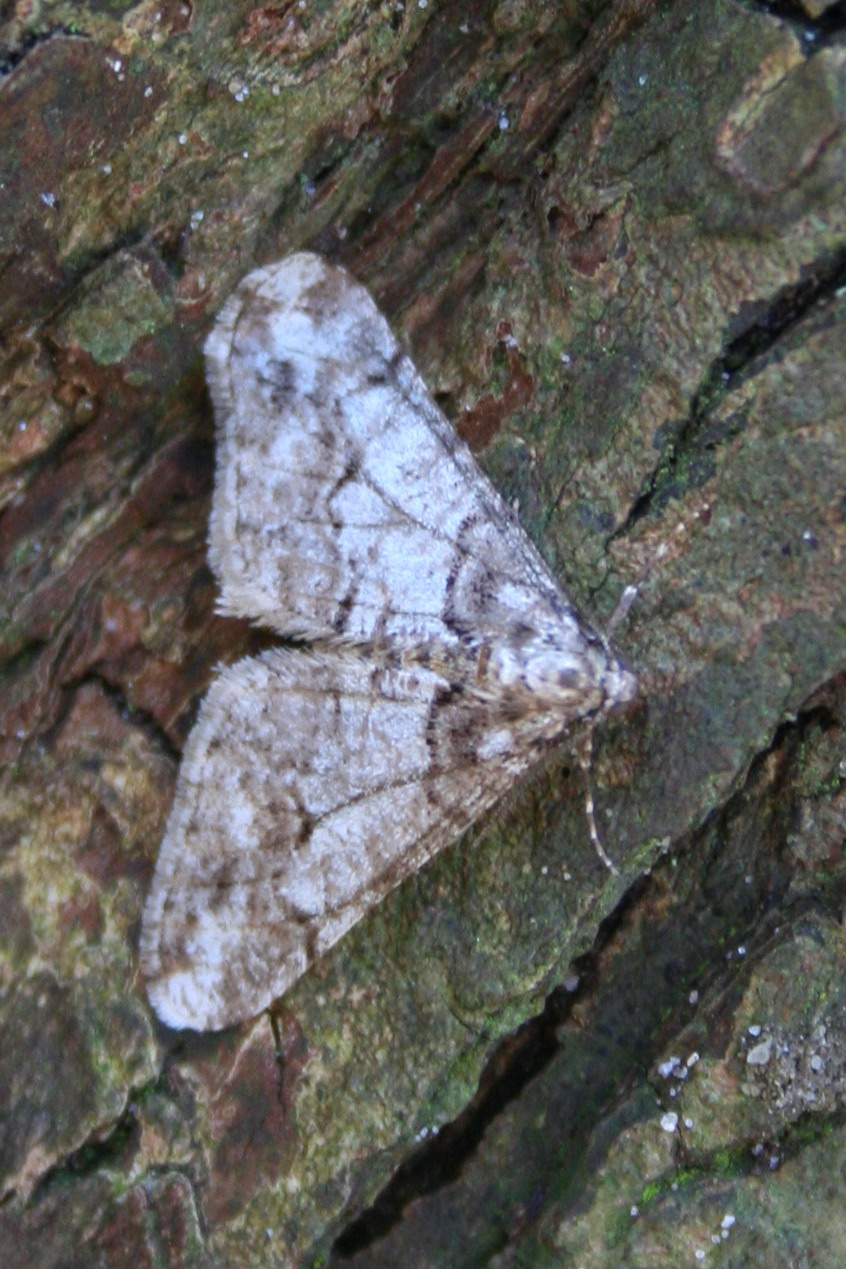
- Agriopis leucophaearia

Scientific classification
- Kingdom: Animalia
- Phylum: Arthropoda
- Class: Insecta
- Order: Lepidoptera
- Family: Geometridae
- Tribe: Bistonini
- Genus: Agriopis; Hübner, [1825]

= Agriopis =

Genus of geometer moths

Agriopis is a genus of moths in the family Geometridae erected by Jacob Hübner in 1825.

== Species ==
- Agriopis aurantiaria (Hübner, 1799) – scarce umber
- Agriopis bajaria (Denis & Schiffermüller, 1775)
- Agriopis beschkovi Ganev, 1987
- Agriopis dira (Butler, 1878)
- Agriopis erectaria (Püngeler, 1908)
- Agriopis japonensis (Warren, 1894)
- Agriopis leucophaearia (Denis & Schiffermüller, 1775) – spring usher
- Agriopis marginaria (Fabricius, 1776) – dotted border
