= Phigaliohybernia =

Scientific classification
- Domain: Eukaryota
- Kingdom: Animalia
- Phylum: Arthropoda
- Class: Insecta
- Order: Lepidoptera
- Family: Geometridae
- Tribe: Bistonini
- Genus: Phigaliohybernia

Genus of moths

Phigaliohybernia is a genus of moths in the family Geometridae.
