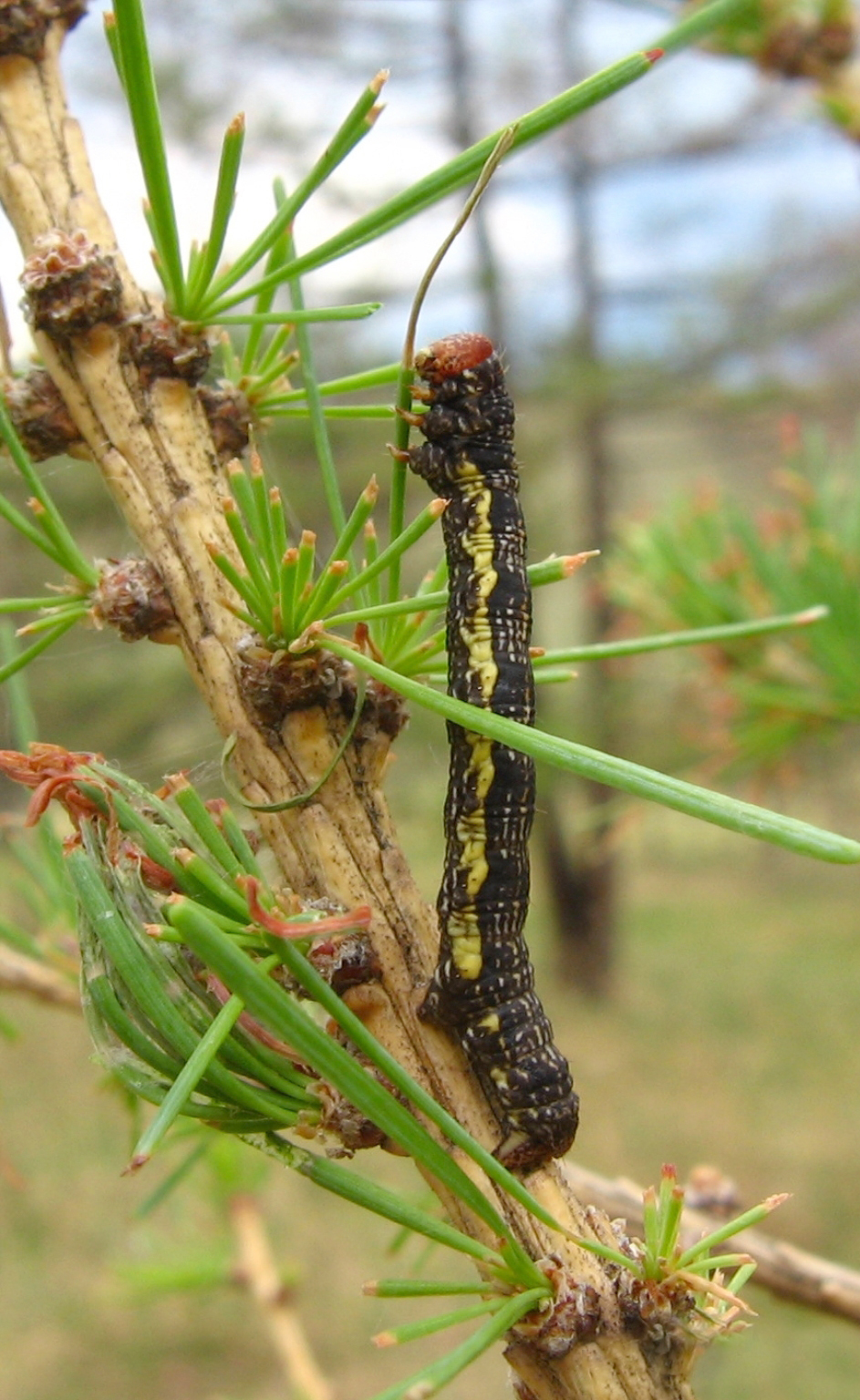
- Larva

Scientific classification
- Domain: Eukaryota
- Kingdom: Animalia
- Phylum: Arthropoda
- Class: Insecta
- Order: Lepidoptera
- Family: Geometridae
- Genus: Erannis
- Species: E. jacobsoni

Binomial name
- Erannis jacobsoni Djakonov, 1926

Synonyms
- Hybernia jacobsoni

= Erannis jacobsoni =

Species of moth

Erannis jacobsoni, or Jacobson's spanworm, is a moth of the family Geometridae. The species was first described by Alexander Michailovitsch Djakonov in 1926. It is found in Europe (Russia: eastern Siberia, the Russian Far East and western Siberia) and Asia (China: Nei Menggu, Japan: Hokkaido, Honshu and Shikoku, Kazakhstan and Mongolia).

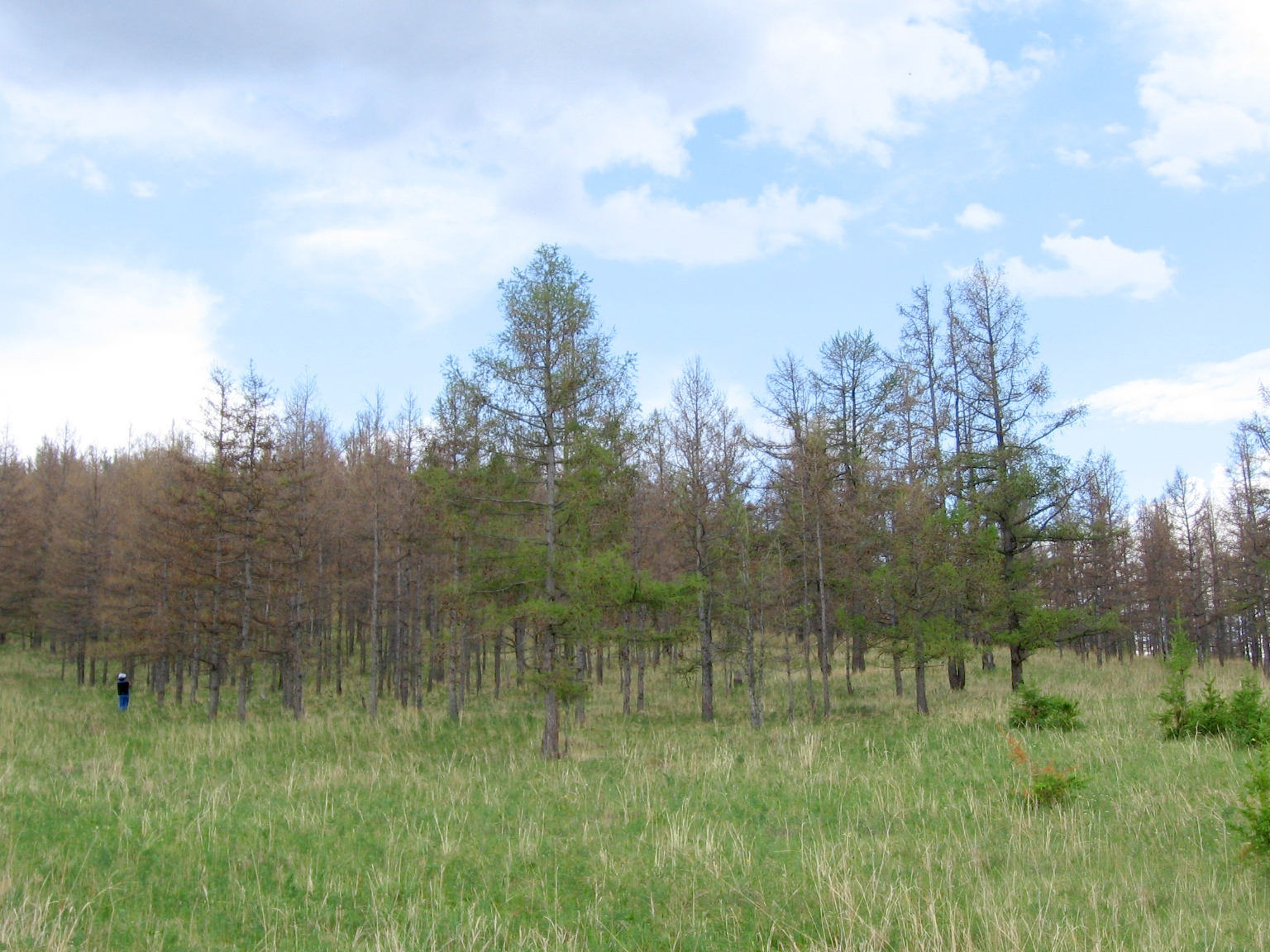
Infestation

The larvae feed on Larix species, including L. gmelinii and L. sibirica.
