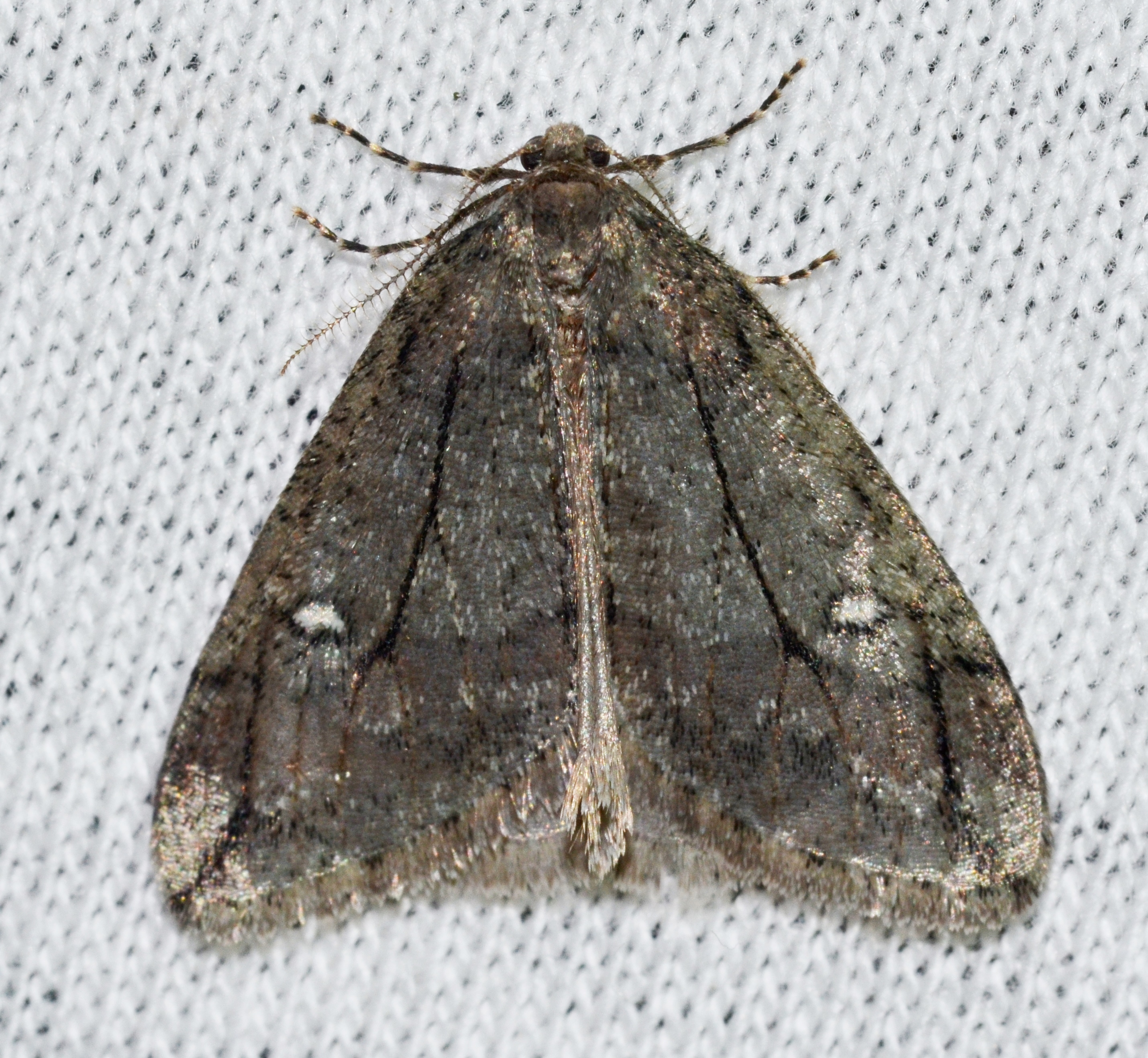

Scientific classification
- Kingdom: Animalia
- Phylum: Arthropoda
- Clade: Pancrustacea
- Class: Insecta
- Order: Lepidoptera
- Family: Geometridae
- Genus: Paleacrita
- Species: P. merriccata

Binomial name
- Paleacrita merriccata Dyar, 1903

= Paleacrita merriccata =

Species of moth

Paleacrita merriccata, the white-spotted cankerworm moth, is a moth of the family Geometridae. The species was first described by Harrison Gray Dyar Jr. in 1903. It is found in eastern North America, where it has been recorded from central Illinois, eastern Missouri, west-central Mississippi, Louisiana and eastern Texas.

The length of the forewings is 14–18 mm for males. The females are wingless. Adult males are on wing in March, April and May in the north and January and February in the south.
