= Cochisea =

Scientific classification
- Domain: Eukaryota
- Kingdom: Animalia
- Phylum: Arthropoda
- Class: Insecta
- Order: Lepidoptera
- Family: Geometridae
- Tribe: Bistonini
- Genus: Cochisea; Barnes & McDunnough, 1916

Genus of moths

Cochisea is a genus of moths in the family Geometridae erected by William Barnes and James Halliday McDunnough in 1916.

== Species ==
- Cochisea barnesi Cassino & Swett, 1922
- Cochisea curva Rindge, 1975
- Cochisea paula Rindge, 1975
- Cochisea recisa Rindge, 1975
- Cochisea rigidaria Barnes & McDunnough, 1916
- Cochisea sinuaria Barnes & McDunnough, 1916
- Cochisea sonomensis McDunnough, 1941
- Cochisea undulata Rindge, 1975
- Cochisea unicoloris Rindge, 1975
