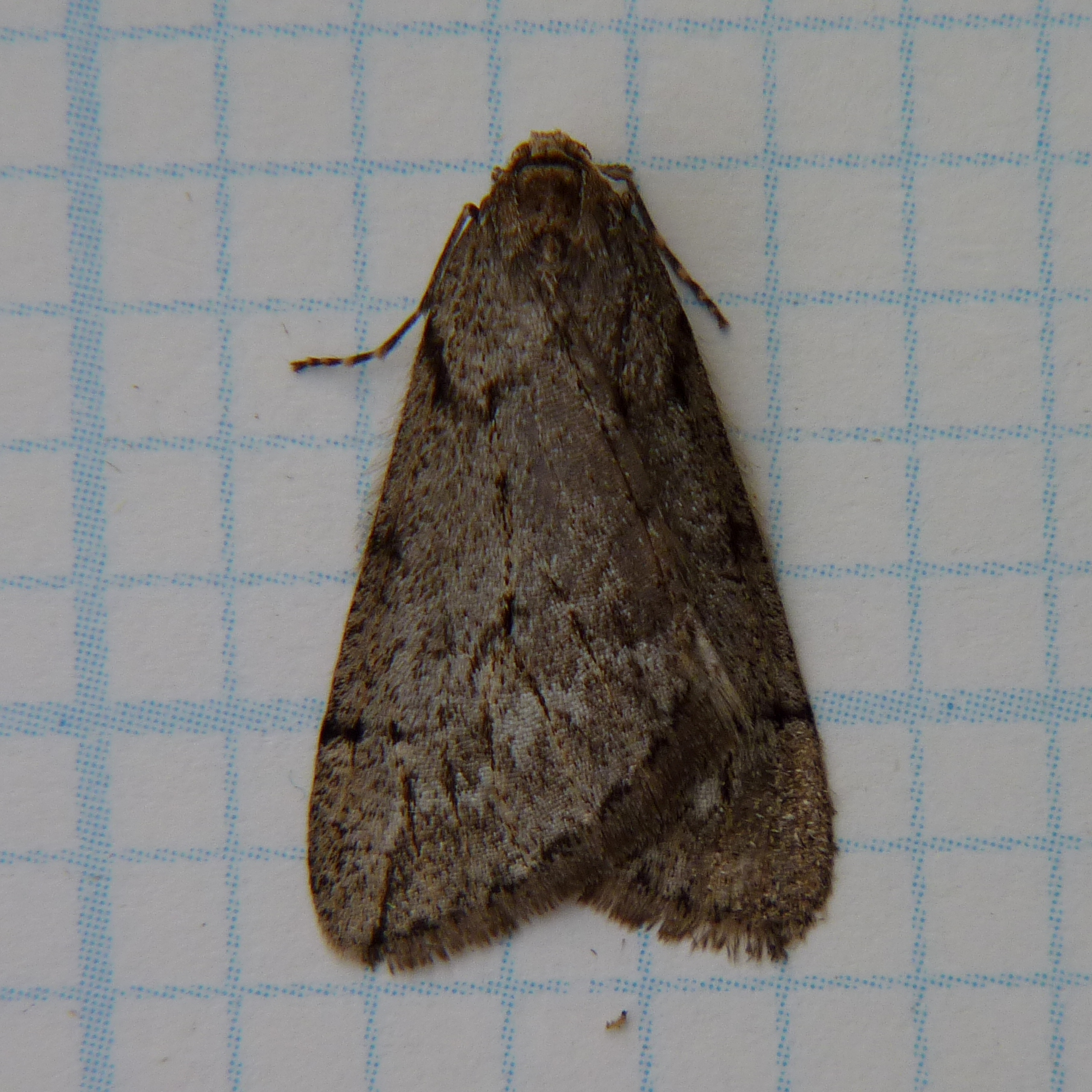
- Paleacrita vernata

Scientific classification
- Domain: Eukaryota
- Kingdom: Animalia
- Phylum: Arthropoda
- Class: Insecta
- Order: Lepidoptera
- Family: Geometridae
- Tribe: Bistonini
- Genus: Paleacrita; Riley, 1876

= Paleacrita =

Genus of moths

Paleacrita is a genus of moths in the family Geometridae first described by Riley in 1876.

== Species ==
- Paleacrita longiciliata Hulst, 1898
- Paleacrita merriccata Dyar, 1903
- Paleacrita vernata (Peck, 1795)
