= Amorphogynia =

Scientific classification
- Kingdom: Animalia
- Phylum: Arthropoda
- Class: Insecta
- Order: Lepidoptera
- Family: Geometridae
- Tribe: Bistonini
- Genus: Amorphogynia; Warren, 1894

Genus of geometer moths

Amorphogynia is a genus of moths in the family Geometridae.

== Species ==
- Amorphogynia inversarius Rebel, 1903
- Amorphogynia necessaria (Zeller, 1849)
