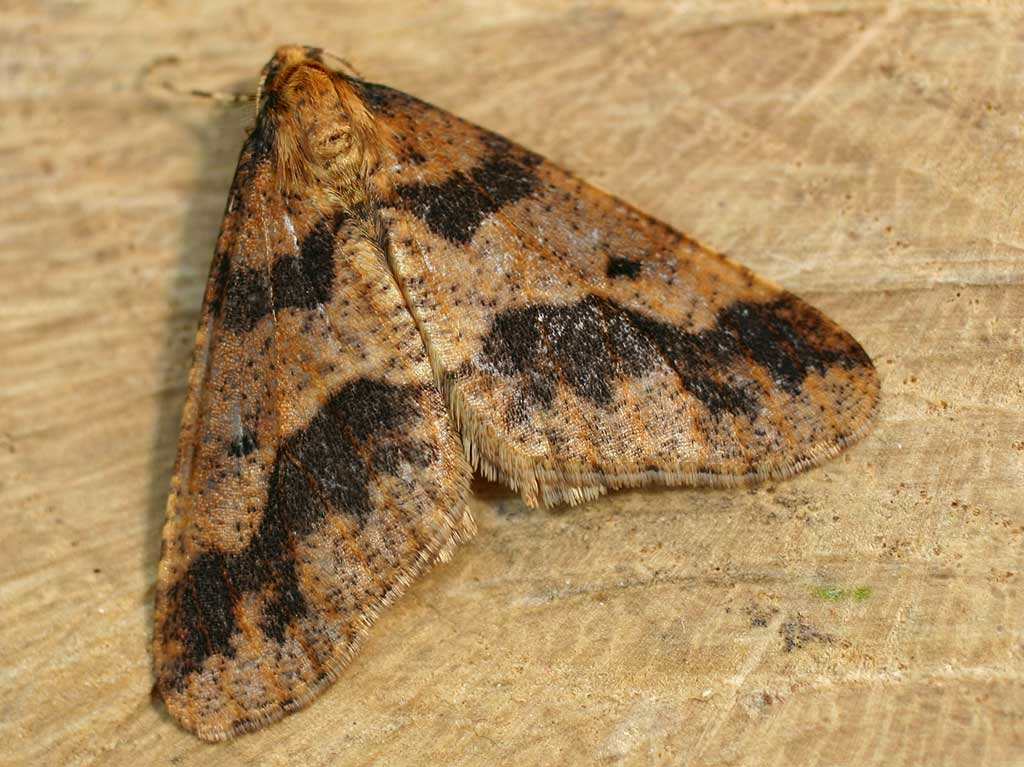
- Male
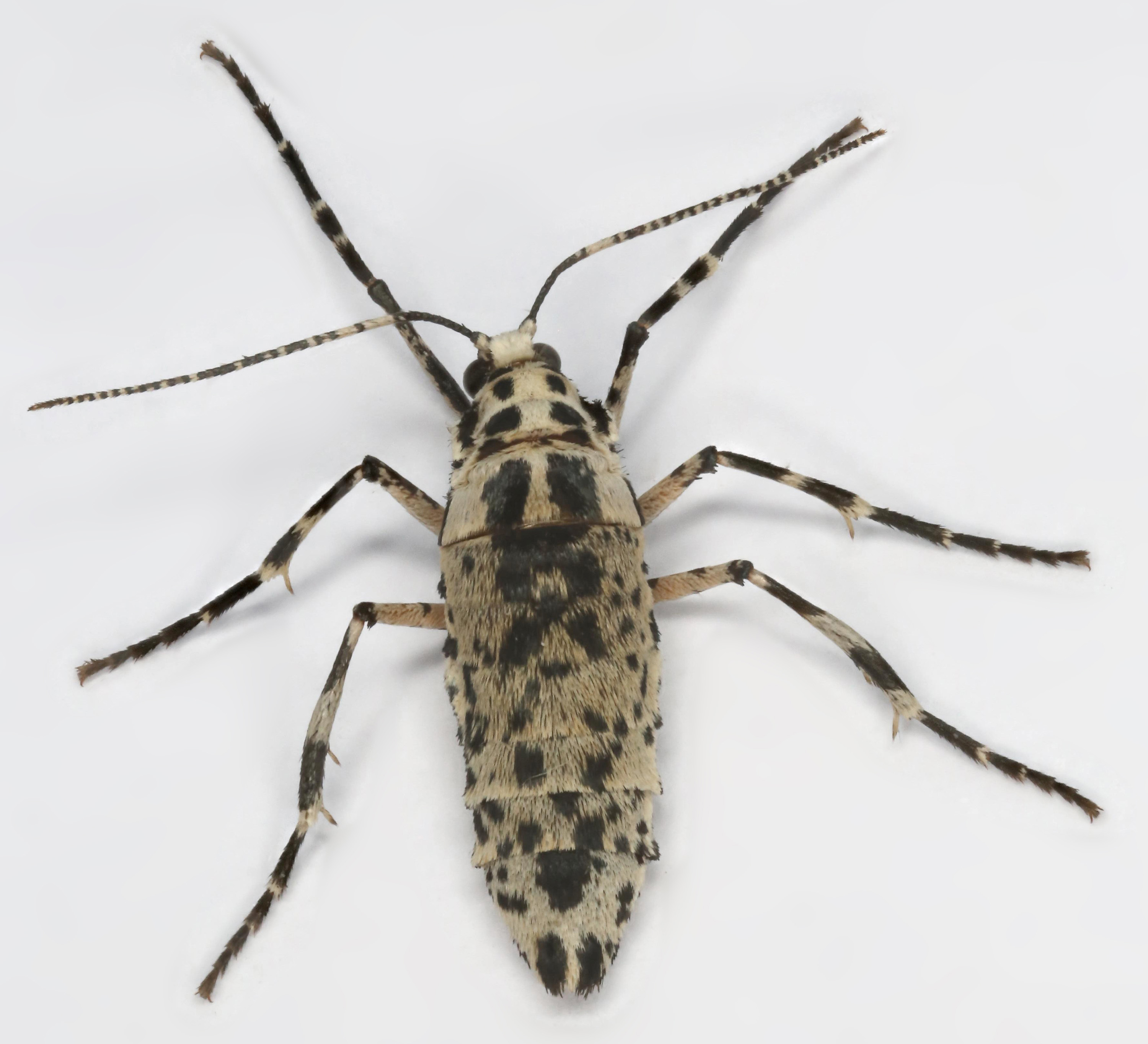
- Female

Scientific classification
- Kingdom: Animalia
- Phylum: Arthropoda
- Clade: Pancrustacea
- Class: Insecta
- Order: Lepidoptera
- Family: Geometridae
- Genus: Erannis
- Species: E. defoliaria

Binomial name
- Erannis defoliaria (Clerck, 1759)

Synonyms
- Phalaena defoliaria Clerck, 1759

= Mottled umber =

Species of moth

The mottled umber (Erannis defoliaria) is a moth of the family Geometridae. It is common throughout much of the Palearctic region. The species was first described by Carl Alexander Clerck in 1759.

== Description ==
Caterpillar on leaf

Only males of the species have wings, the female is completely wingless. Patterns on wings vary by specimen, the wingspan is 30-40mm. The adults fly from October to December in temperate climates.

=== Technical description and variation ===
The female of this species is wingless and rather spider-like and can be found on the trunks and stems of its larval food plants. She is white or yellow-and-black patched. The male is fully winged and very variable. The ground colour of the forewing is pale yellow or light yellow ochre and suffused dark grey. The basal and distal fasciae are dark brown. The basal fascia is bordered on the inner side by a brown cloud; the distal fascia has a brown cloud on the outer edge. There is also a brown cloud along the costa. There are two dark brown oblong spots in the upper half of the terminal area. The hindwing is grey white with grey suffusion. There is a grey-black discal spot on both wings. There are numerous and significant deviations from this colour pattern and some specimens are very dark. Truly melanic forms are also frequent. As with the peppered moth, the darker forms tend to be prevalent in industrial areas.

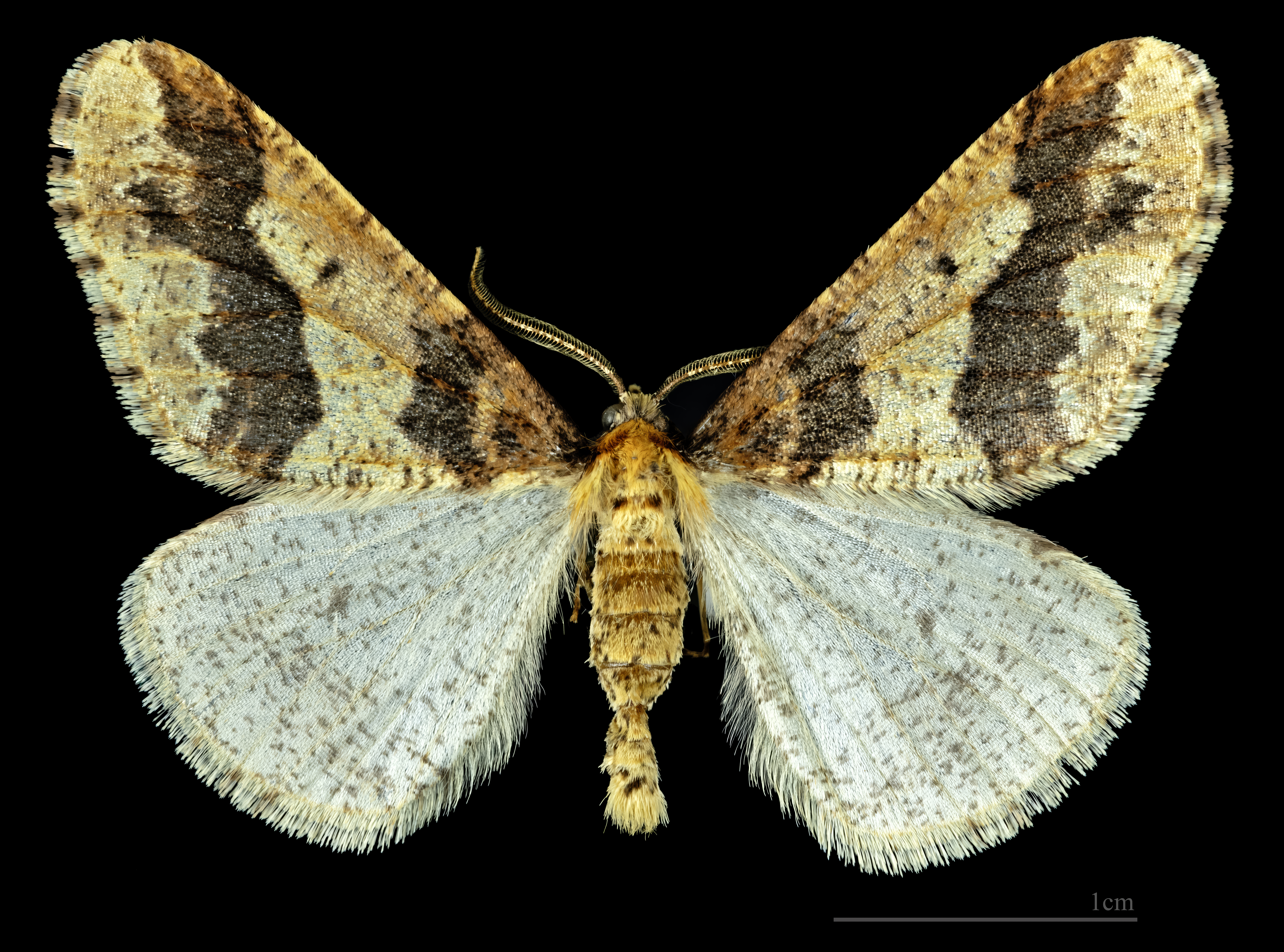
♂

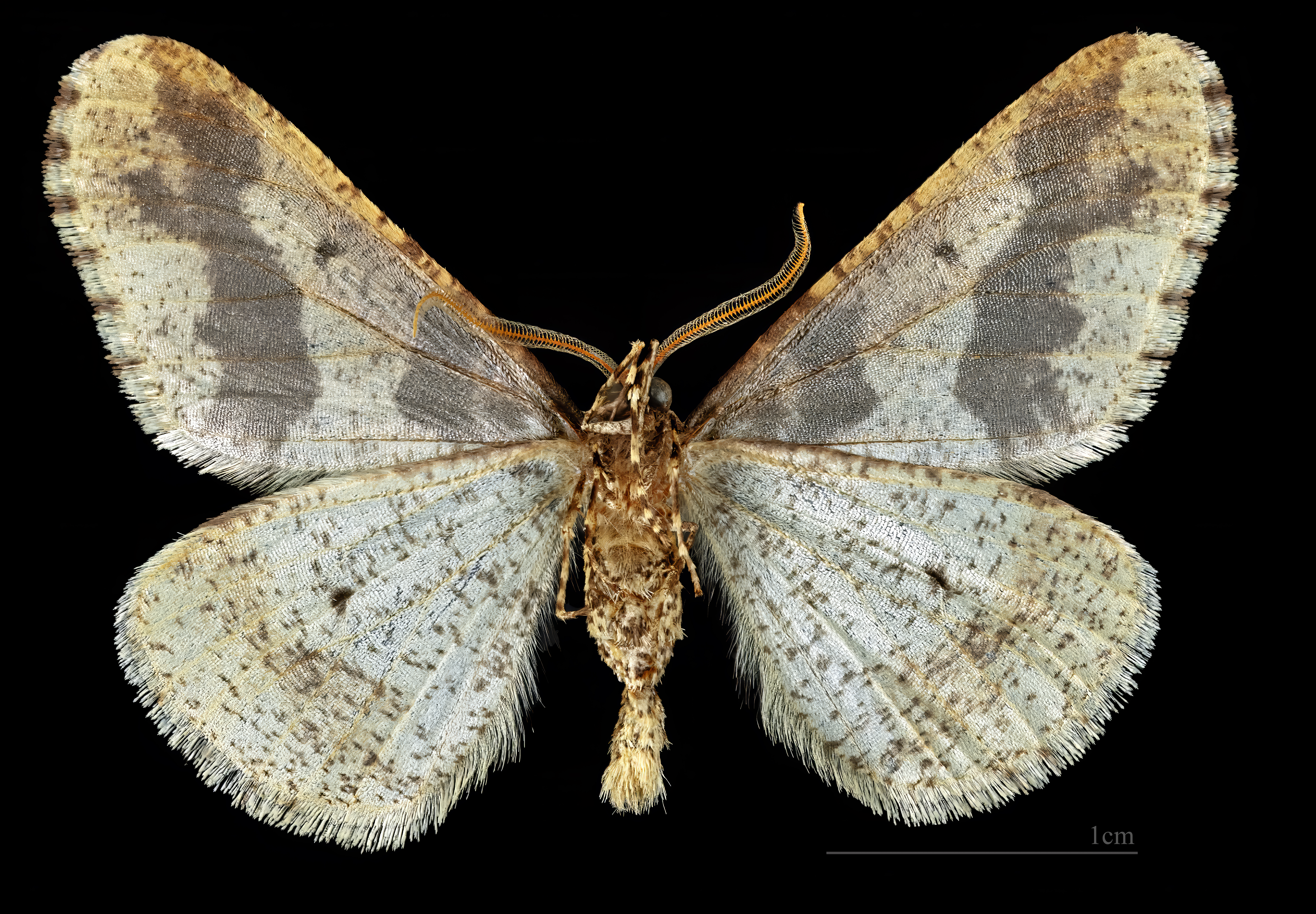
♂ △

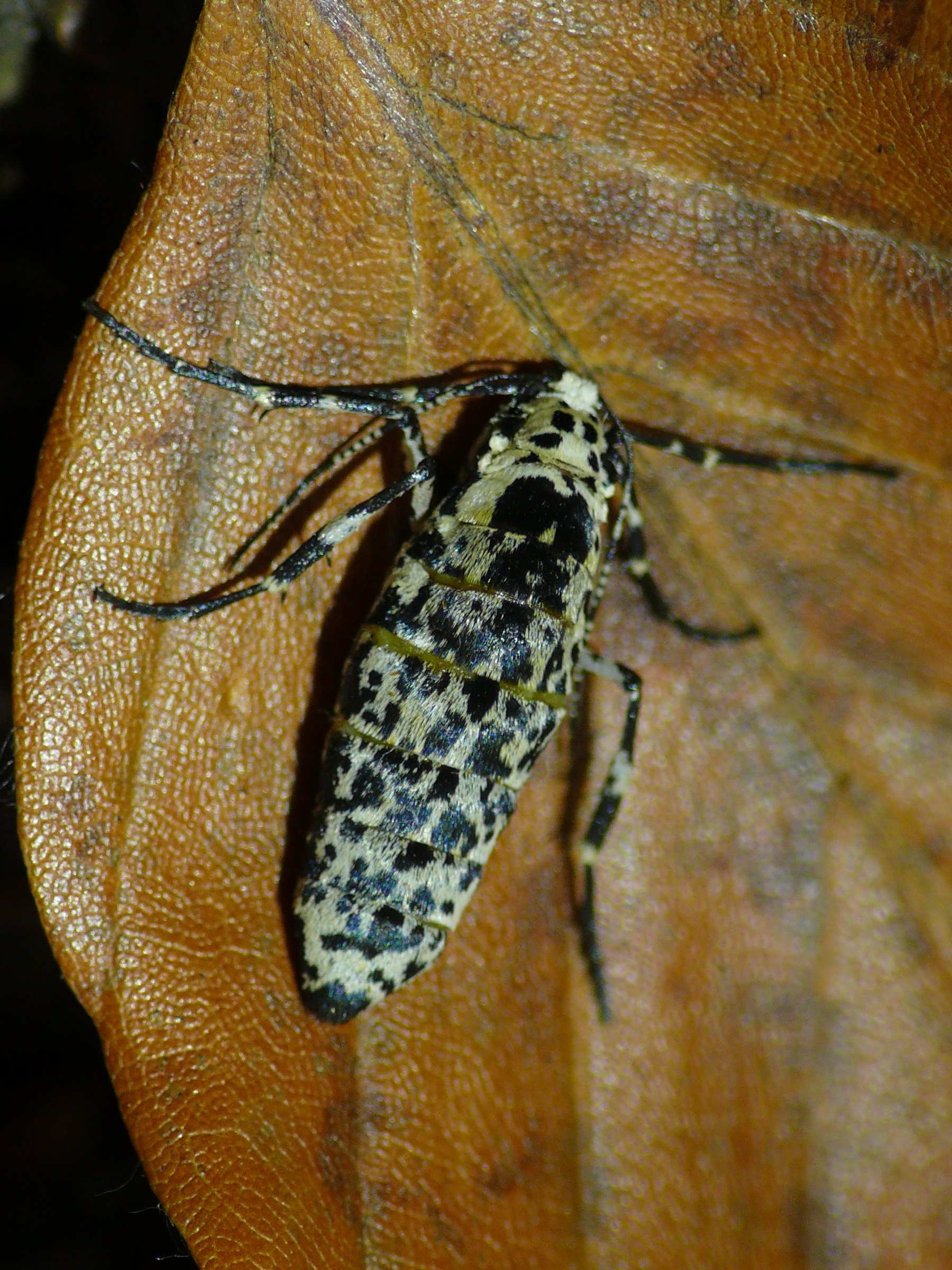
♀

== Distribution ==
The species can be found in western Europe from northern Scandinavia to the Mediterranean, then east to the Caucasus, northern Iran, Russia, Russian Far East, and Ussuri.

== Biology ==
The adults have been recorded from September to December in the Great Britain and Ireland. Males are attracted to light. The egg is oval with very shallow, somewhat zigzag longitudinal ridges, a cell-pattern only discernible on high magnification and brownish yellow, without gloss. The larva is also variable from cream to dark brown and quite gaily coloured. It feeds on a wide variety of trees and shrubs (see list below) and can be a serious pest in orchards. The species overwinters as an egg.

Larval food plants include,

- apple (Malus species)
- birch – silver (Betula pendula), downy (Betula pubescens)
- blackthorn (Prunus spinosa)
- dog rose (Rosa canina)
- elm (Ulmus species)
- field maple (Acer campestre)
- hawthorn – midland (Crataegus laevigata) common (Crataegus monogyna)
- hazel (Corylus avellana)
- hornbeam (Carpinus betulus)
- oak – sessile (Quercus petraea), pedunculate (Quercus robur)
- sallow – (Salix species) including goat (Salix caprea)
- Sitka spruce (Picea sitchensis)
- sweet chestnut (Castanea sativa)
- sycamore (Acer pseudoplatanus)

== Similar species ==
- Agriopis aurantiaria
- Agriopis marginaria

== Gallery ==
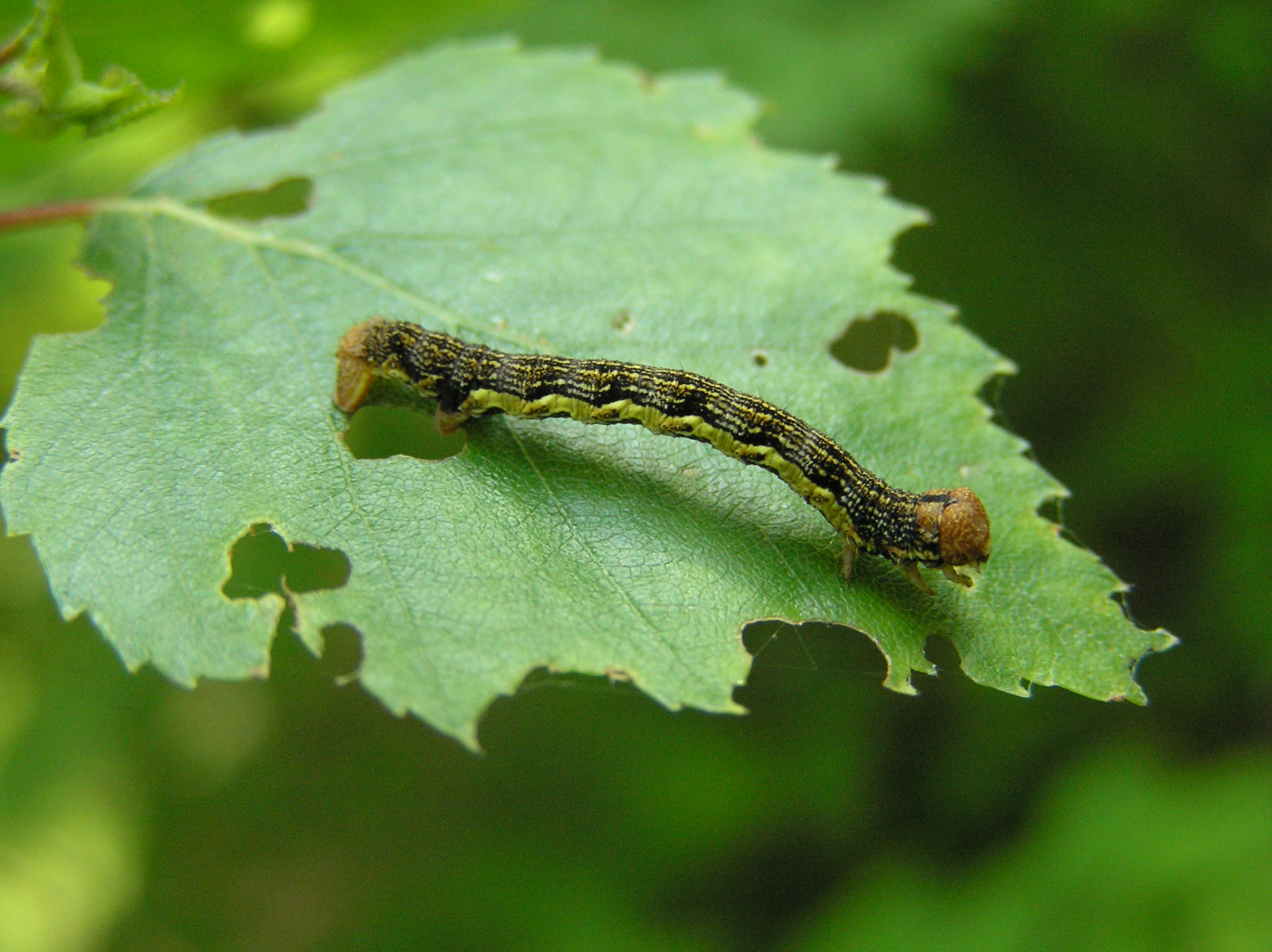
Caterpillar

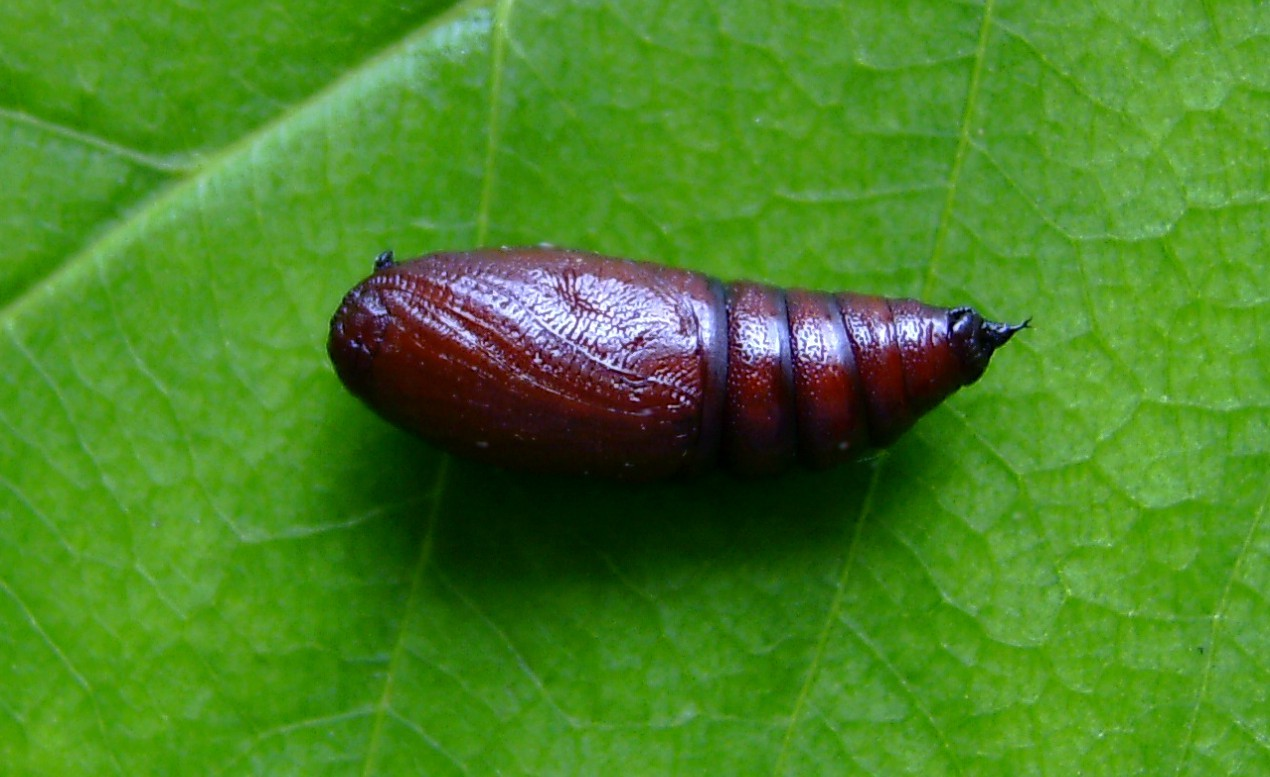
Pupa

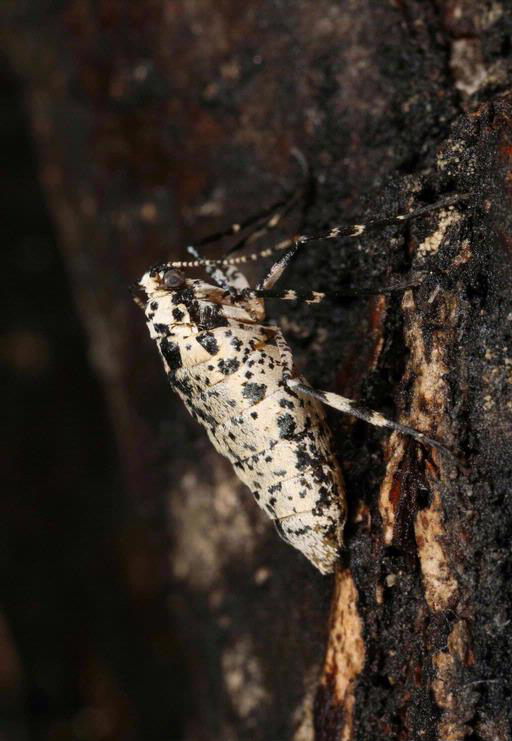
Wingless female

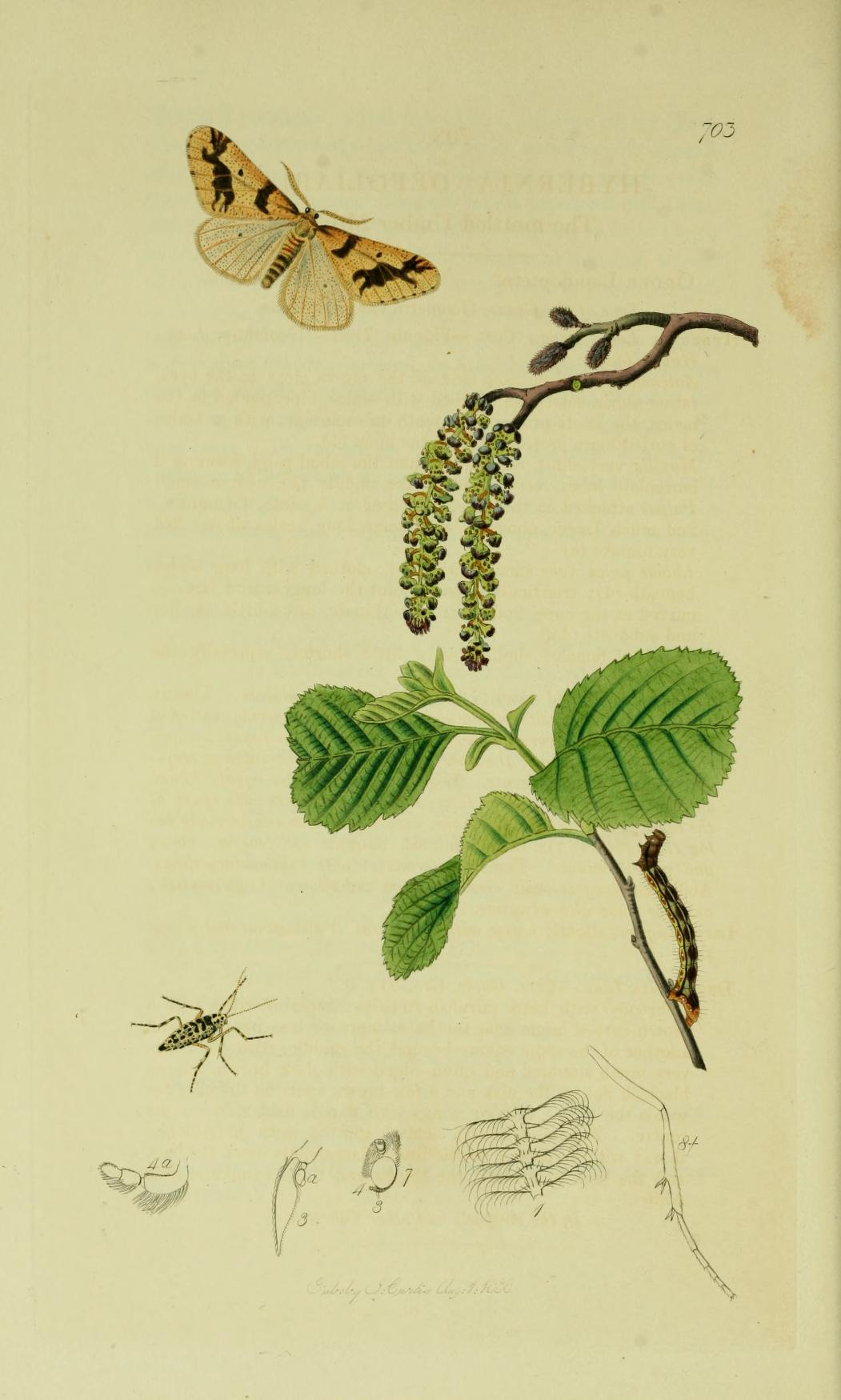
Illustration from John Curtis's British Entomology Volume 6
