= Protalcis =

Scientific classification
- Domain: Eukaryota
- Kingdom: Animalia
- Phylum: Arthropoda
- Class: Insecta
- Order: Lepidoptera
- Family: Geometridae
- Tribe: Bistonini
- Genus: Protalcis

Genus of moths

Protalcis is a genus of moth in the family Geometridae.
