= Pterotocera =

Scientific classification
- Domain: Eukaryota
- Kingdom: Animalia
- Phylum: Arthropoda
- Class: Insecta
- Order: Lepidoptera
- Family: Geometridae
- Tribe: Bistonini
- Genus: Pterotocera; Staudinger, 1882

Genus of moths

Pterotocera is a genus of moths in the family Geometridae. The genus was described by Staudinger in 1882.

== Species ==
- Pterotocera ussurica Djakonov, 1949
- Pterotocera insignilinearia Beljaev, 1994
- Pterotocera declinata Staudinger, 1882
- Pterotocera suidunaria (Alphéraky, 1883)
- Pterotocera armeniacae Djakonov, 1949
