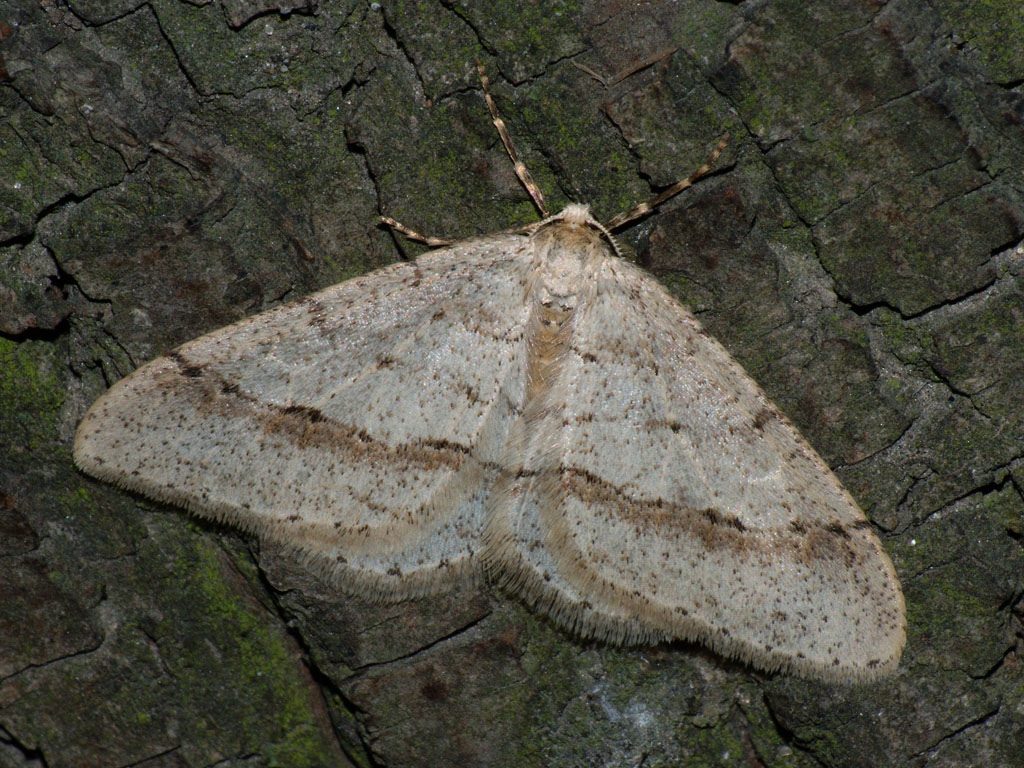
- Larerannis orthogrammaria

Scientific classification
- Domain: Eukaryota
- Kingdom: Animalia
- Phylum: Arthropoda
- Class: Insecta
- Order: Lepidoptera
- Family: Geometridae
- Tribe: Bistonini
- Genus: Larerannis; Wehrli, 1935

= Larerannis =

Genus of moths

Larerannis is a genus of moths in the family Geometridae described by Wehrli in 1935.

== Species ==
- Larerannis orthogrammaria (Wehrli, 1927)
- Larerannis filipjevi Wehrli, 1935
