= Cochisea sonomensis =

Scientific classification
- Domain: Eukaryota
- Kingdom: Animalia
- Phylum: Arthropoda
- Class: Insecta
- Order: Lepidoptera
- Family: Geometridae
- Genus: Cochisea
- Species: C. sonomensis

Binomial name
- Cochisea sonomensis McDunnough, 1941

Species of moth

Cochisea sonomensis is a species of geometrid moth in the family Geometridae. It is found in North America.

The MONA or Hodges number for Cochisea sonomensis is 6647.
