= Cochisea rigidaria =

Scientific classification
- Kingdom: Animalia
- Phylum: Arthropoda
- Class: Insecta
- Order: Lepidoptera
- Family: Geometridae
- Genus: Cochisea
- Species: C. rigidaria

Binomial name
- Cochisea rigidaria Barnes & McDunnough, 1916

Species of moth

Cochisea rigidaria is a species of moth in the family Geometridae first described by William Barnes and James Halliday McDunnough in 1916. It is found in North America.

The MONA or Hodges number for Cochisea rigidaria is 6642.
