= Microbiston =

Scientific classification
- Domain: Eukaryota
- Kingdom: Animalia
- Phylum: Arthropoda
- Class: Insecta
- Order: Lepidoptera
- Family: Geometridae
- Tribe: Bistonini
- Genus: Microbiston; Staudinger, 1882

Genus of moths

Microbiston is a genus of moths in the family Geometridae described by Staudinger in 1882.

== Species ==
- Microbiston lanarius (Eversmann, 1852)
- Microbiston turanicus Staudinger, 1892
- Microbiston phaeothorax Wehrli, 1941
