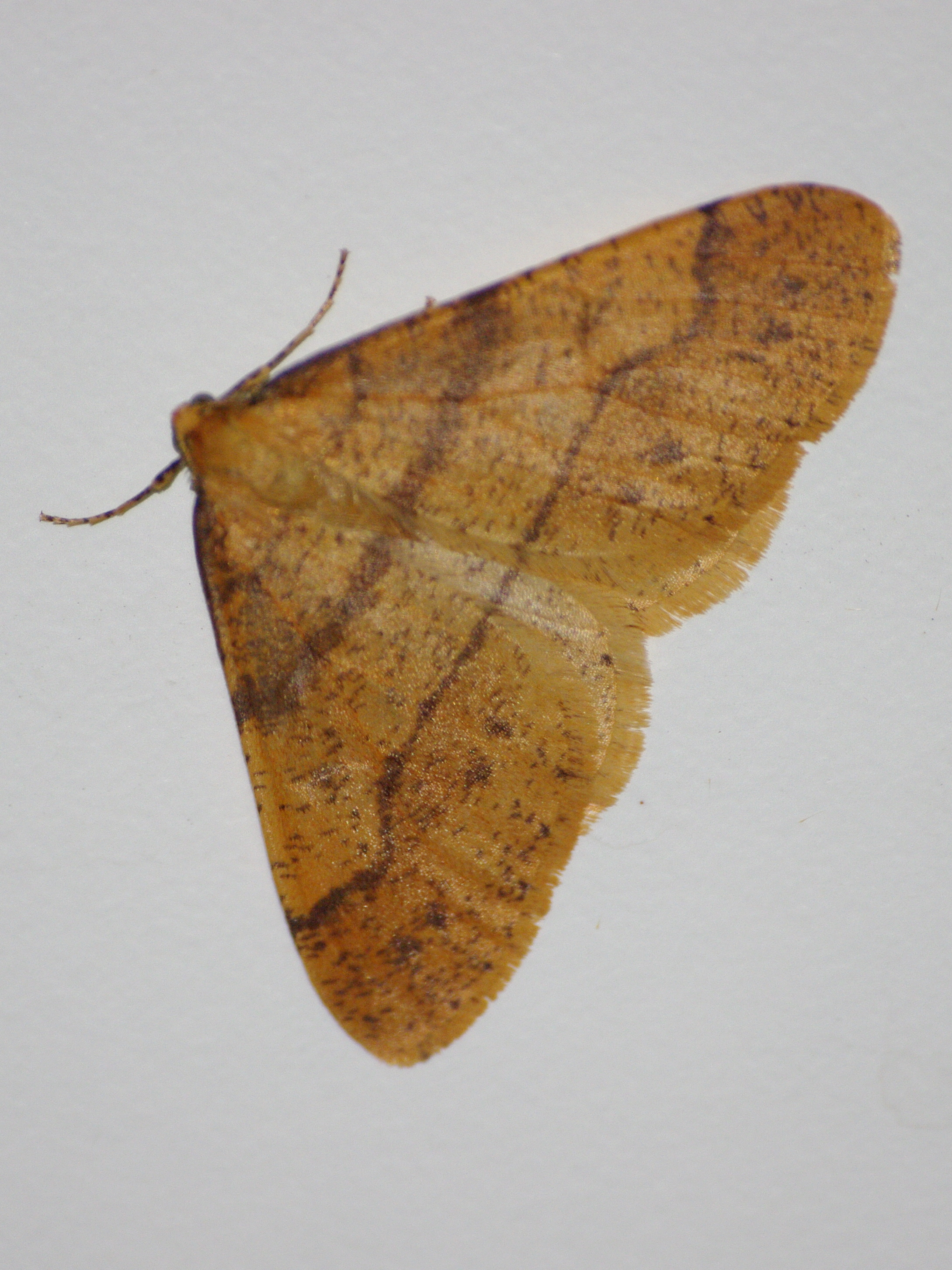

Scientific classification
- Kingdom: Animalia
- Phylum: Arthropoda
- Class: Insecta
- Order: Lepidoptera
- Family: Geometridae
- Genus: Agriopis
- Species: A. aurantiaria

Binomial name
- Agriopis aurantiaria (Hübner, 1799)

= Agriopis aurantiaria =

Scarce umber

Species of moth

Agriopis aurantiaria, the scarce umber, is a moth of the family Geometridae. It was first described by Jacob Hübner in 1799 and it is found throughout Europe from Spain through Central Europe to Russia. In the south it can be found from the western Mediterranean to the Black Sea and the Caucasus. Its northern distribution reaches as far as central Fennoscandia. The species can be found in many different places, including deciduous forests, orchards, gardens as well as parks and settlement areas.

The wingspan is 27–35 mm. There is a strong sexual dimorphism.

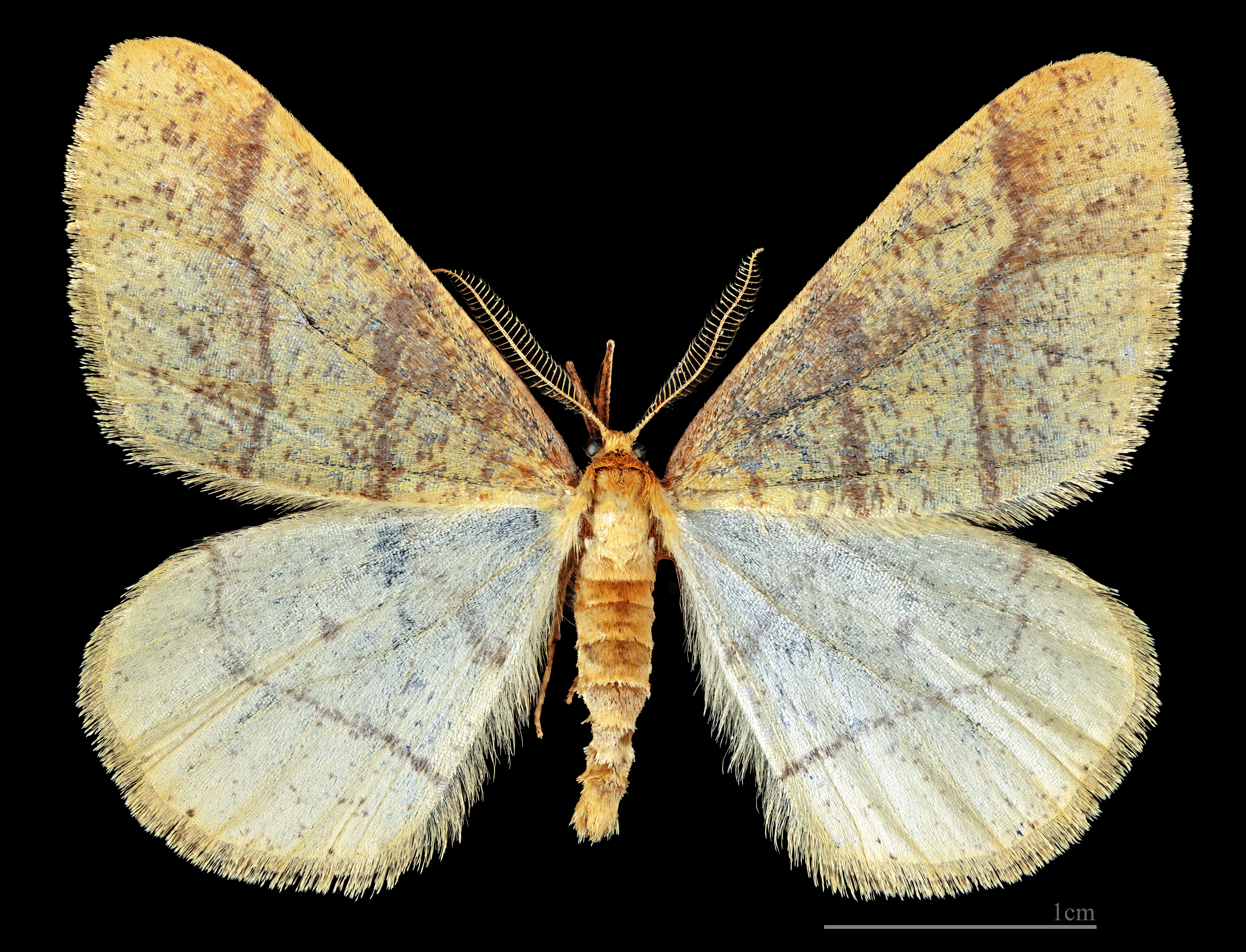
♂

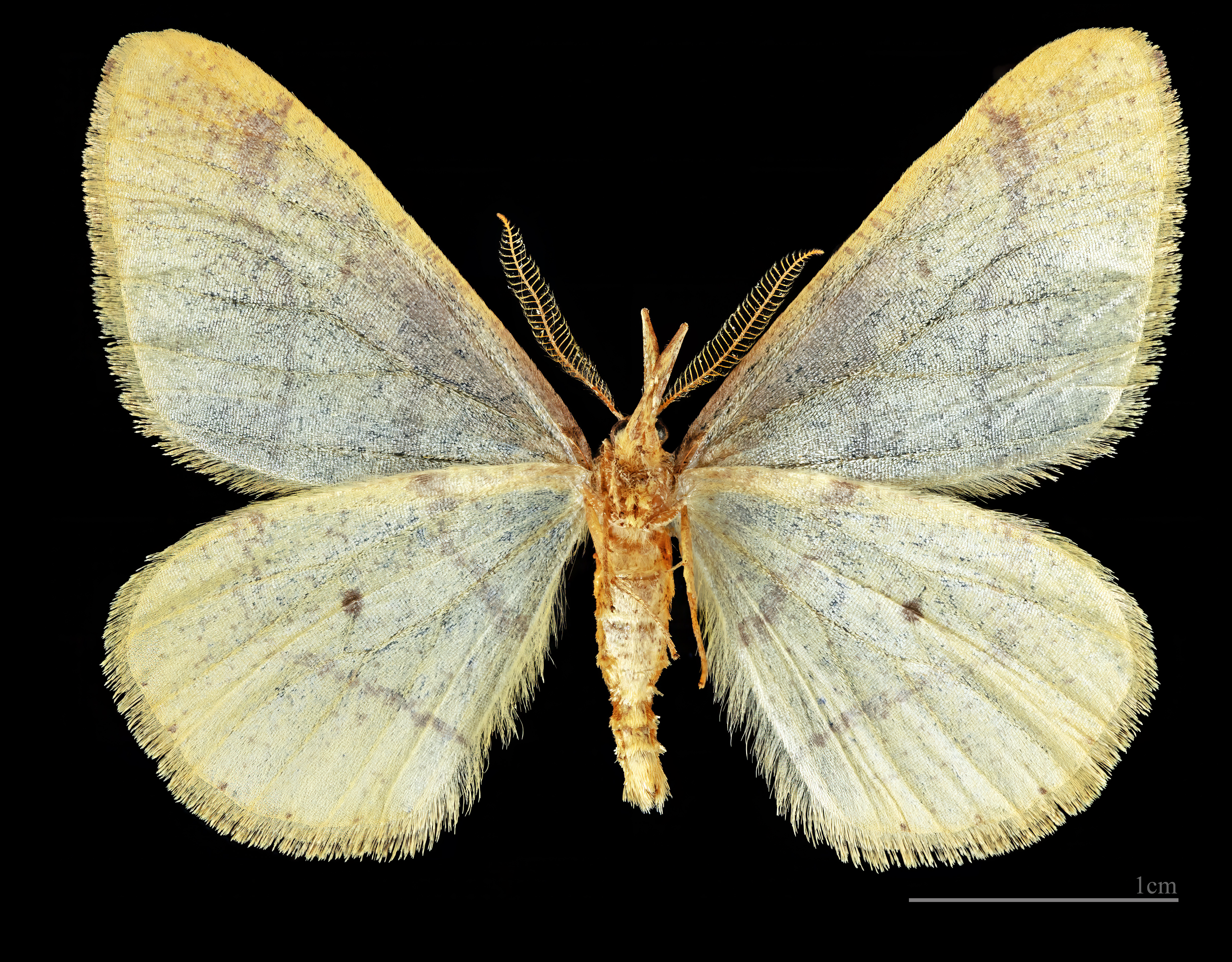
♂ △

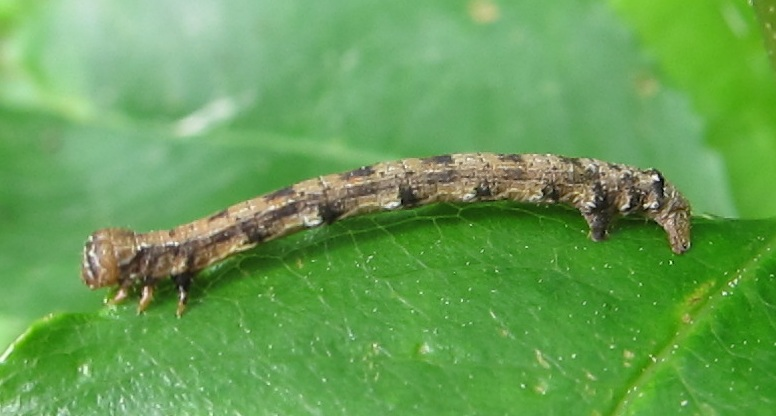
Larva

The males have normally developed wings. The forewings are dark golden yellow or orange yellow to light brown and dusted with many black scales. There are three brown-grey transverse bands the outermost broken. Sometimes there are large black patches in the postdiscal area. The hindwings have the same basic colour as the forewings, but are however always paler with two thin, dark lines. The antennae are double saw combed. The male differs from its congeners in its bright golden-brown colour. Forma include — ab. fumipennaria Heilweger. Forewing infuscated (violet -brown), only the fringe yellow; hindwing also more or less smoky. male-ab. fasciata Linstoiv has a dark band distally to the postmedian line.

The flightless females have almost entirely vestigial wings, a clumsy body, tapering at the end of body shape and are grey brown. The stub wings have are grey with two black crosses.

The egg is flattened at one end, longitudinally ribbed and purplish. The caterpillar is yellowish, inclining to ochreous, lined with brown on the back, and striped with purplish on the sides. The underside is dark purplish brown, inclining to blackish, and striped with yellowish.

Adults are on wing from October to November.

The larvae feed on various deciduous trees, including Betula, Quercus robur, Sorbus aucuparia, Rosa and Prunus padus.

== Subspecies ==
- Agriopis aurantiaria aurantiaria
- Agriopis aurantiaria cleui
- Agriopis aurantiaria lariciaria

== Similar species ==
- Erannis defoliaria
- Agriopis marginaria
