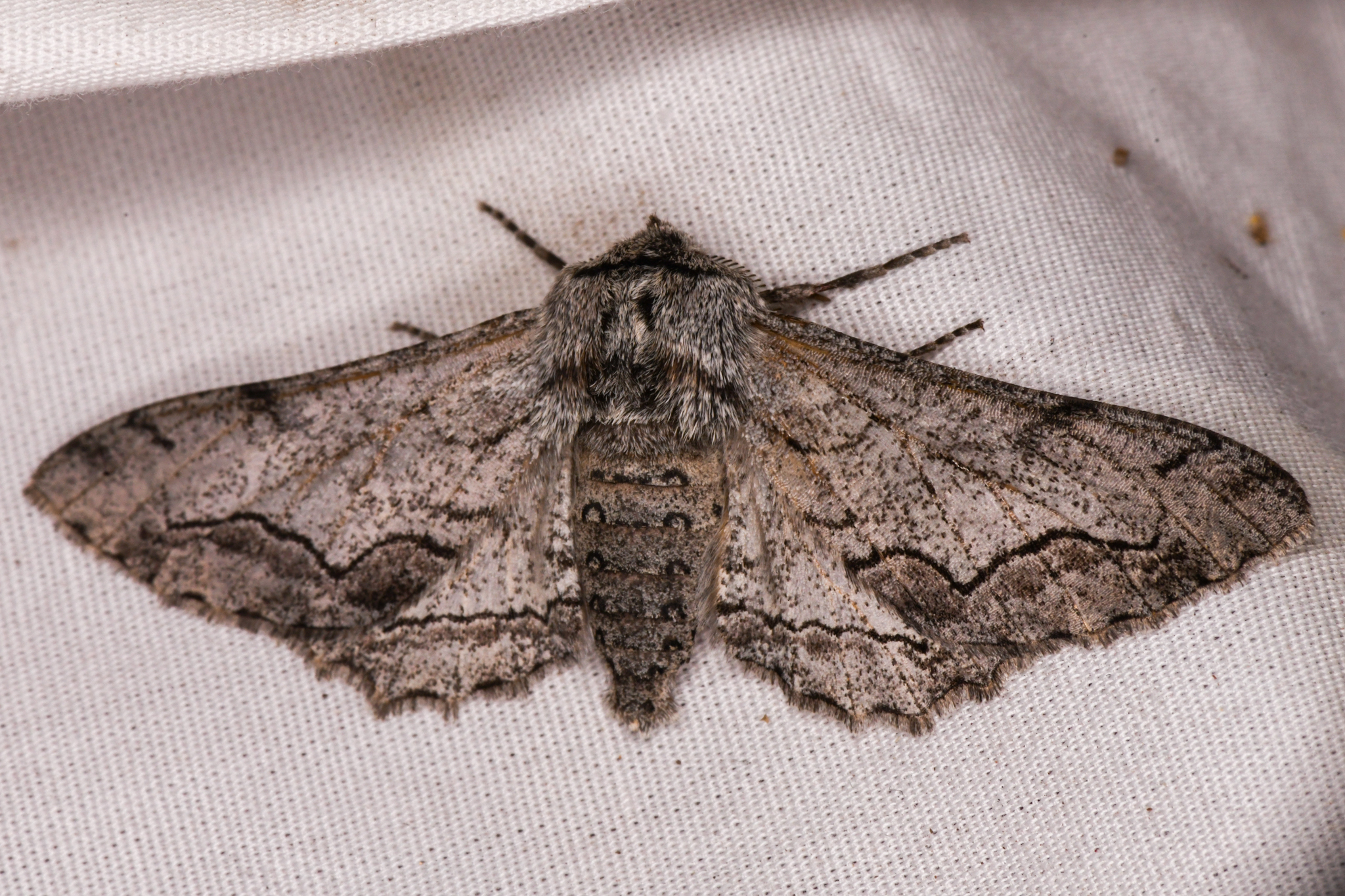

Scientific classification
- Kingdom: Animalia
- Phylum: Arthropoda
- Class: Insecta
- Order: Lepidoptera
- Family: Geometridae
- Genus: Cochisea
- Species: C. sinuaria

Binomial name
- Cochisea sinuaria Barnes & McDunnough, 1916

= Cochisea sinuaria =

Species of moth

Cochisea sinuaria is a species of moth in the family Geometridae first described by William Barnes and James Halliday McDunnough in 1916. It is found in North America.
