= Megabiston =

Scientific classification
- Domain: Eukaryota
- Kingdom: Animalia
- Phylum: Arthropoda
- Class: Insecta
- Order: Lepidoptera
- Family: Geometridae
- Genus: Megabiston; Warren, 1894
- Species: M. plumosaria

Binomial name
- Megabiston plumosaria (Leech, 1891)

Synonyms
- Biston plumosaria Leech, 1891

Genus of moths

Megabiston is a monotypic moth genus in the family Geometridae described by Warren in 1894. Its only species, Megabiston plumosaria, first described by John Henry Leech in 1891, is found in Japan.
