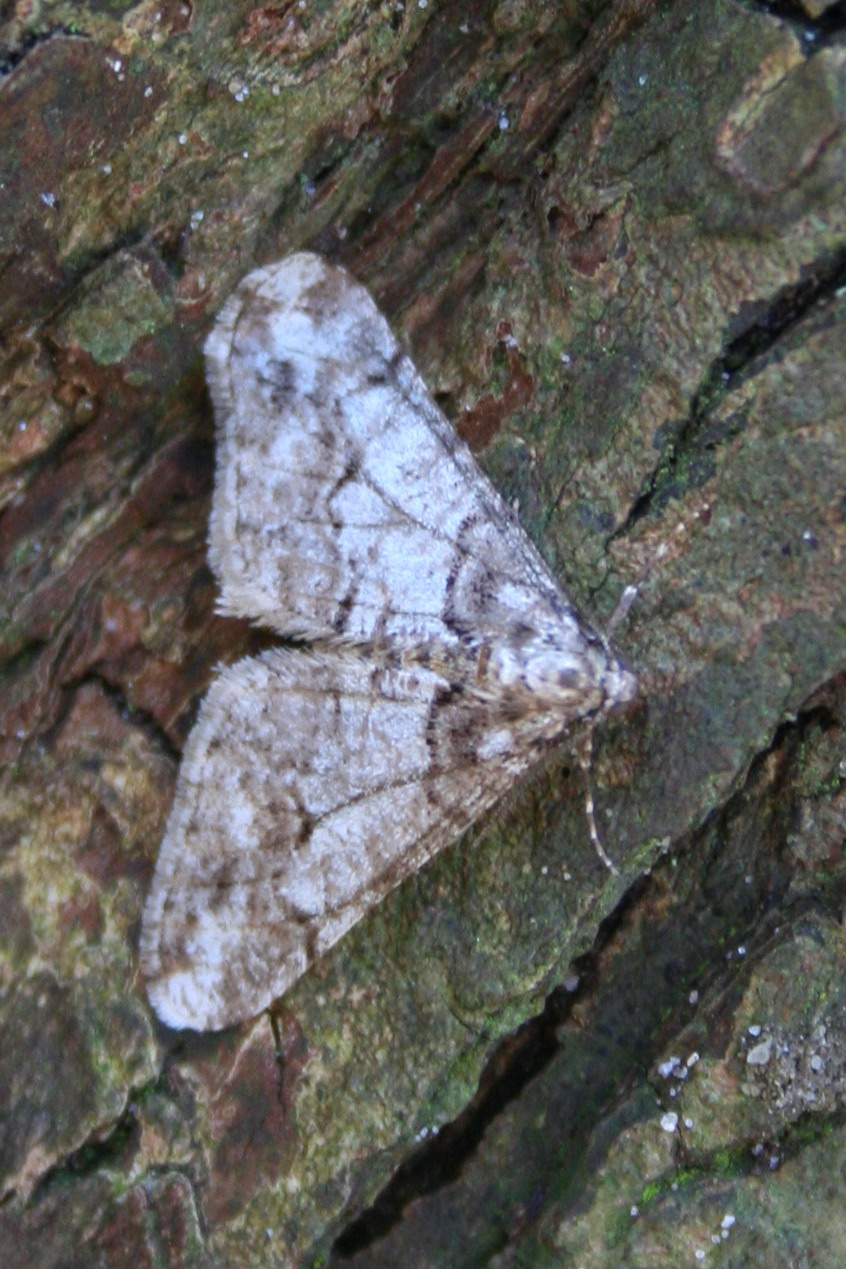

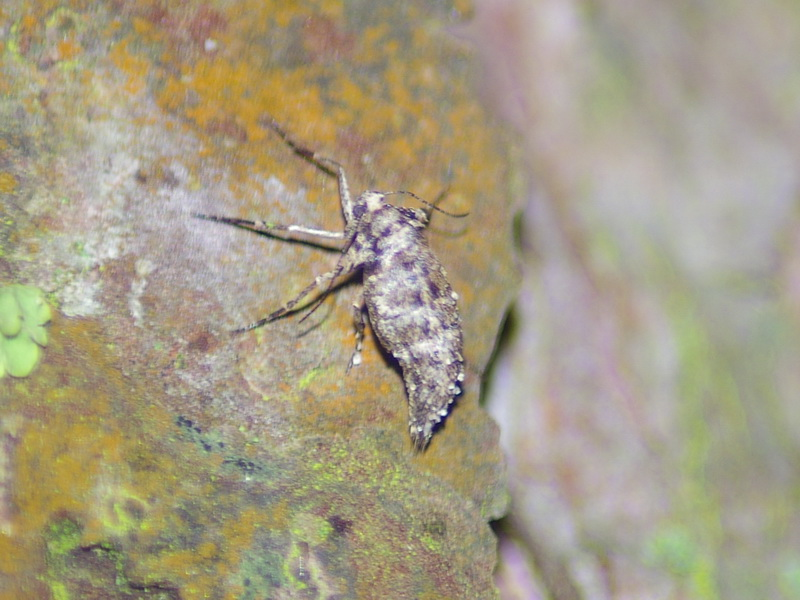

Scientific classification
- Kingdom: Animalia
- Phylum: Arthropoda
- Class: Insecta
- Order: Lepidoptera
- Family: Geometridae
- Genus: Agriopis
- Species: A. leucophaearia

Binomial name
- Agriopis leucophaearia (Denis & Schiffermüller, 1775)

= Agriopis leucophaearia =

Species of moth

Agriopis leucophaearia, the spring usher, is a moth of the family Geometridae. The species was first described by Michael Denis and Ignaz Schiffermüller in 1775. It is a Palearctic species found from Europe, Turkey and Regions of the Russian Federation: the Volga-Don, East Caucasus, the European Central Black Earth, Central European, European southern taiga, the Western Caucasus, Kaliningrad, Mid-Volzhsky., mainly in oak forests and in heathland with low-growing oaks.

The ground colour of the wings is usually whitish. The forewings are nuanced red brown at the base and the tip, with discontinuous black lines associated with areas streaked with black. The hindwings of the underside are stippled black. Some individuals may be more dark (brown and black stains) and there are named variants. See Prout (1912–16). The female is wingless. The male has a wingspan of 10–30 mm. The egg is long-oval, pointed at one end; light grass-green. The rather stout larva is green with yellow lines and brown dorsal blotches

== Similar species ==
A. leucophaearia is extremely variable.Nearest to Agriopis bajaria (Denis & Schiffermüller, 1775) (forewing of male with distal margin straighter, hindwing with costal margin relatively less long; ground-colour generally whiter. Antennal pectinations shorter, ending in longer cilia).In the east Palearctic it is replaced by Agriopis dira (Butler, 1878) - Amur, Primorye, Japan, NE.China.

Adults emerge from overwintering pupae in February and March. The females climb up tree trunks and the males fly weakly to them.

The larvae feed mainly on oak (Quercus) but also on Betula and Rosa.

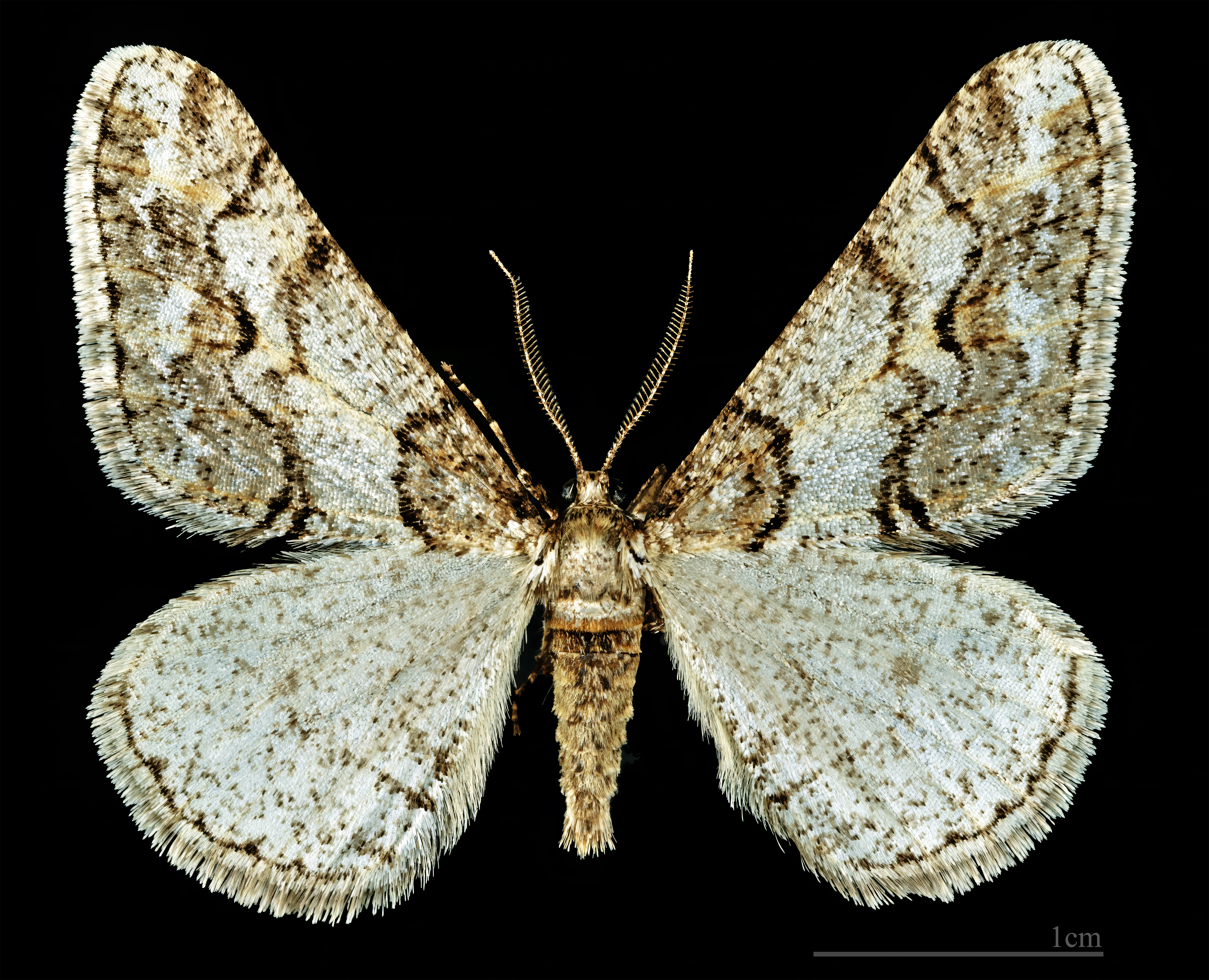
♂

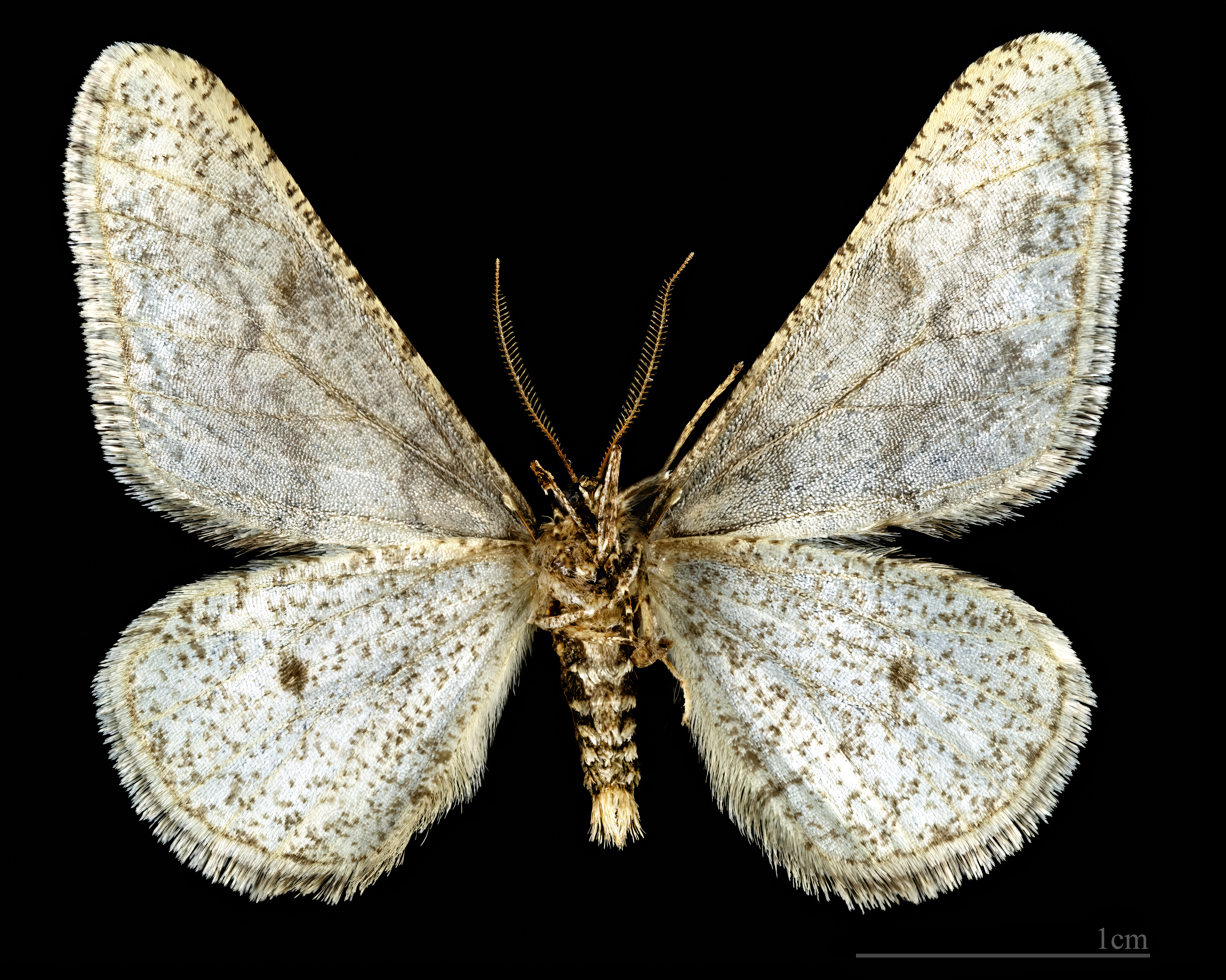
♂ △

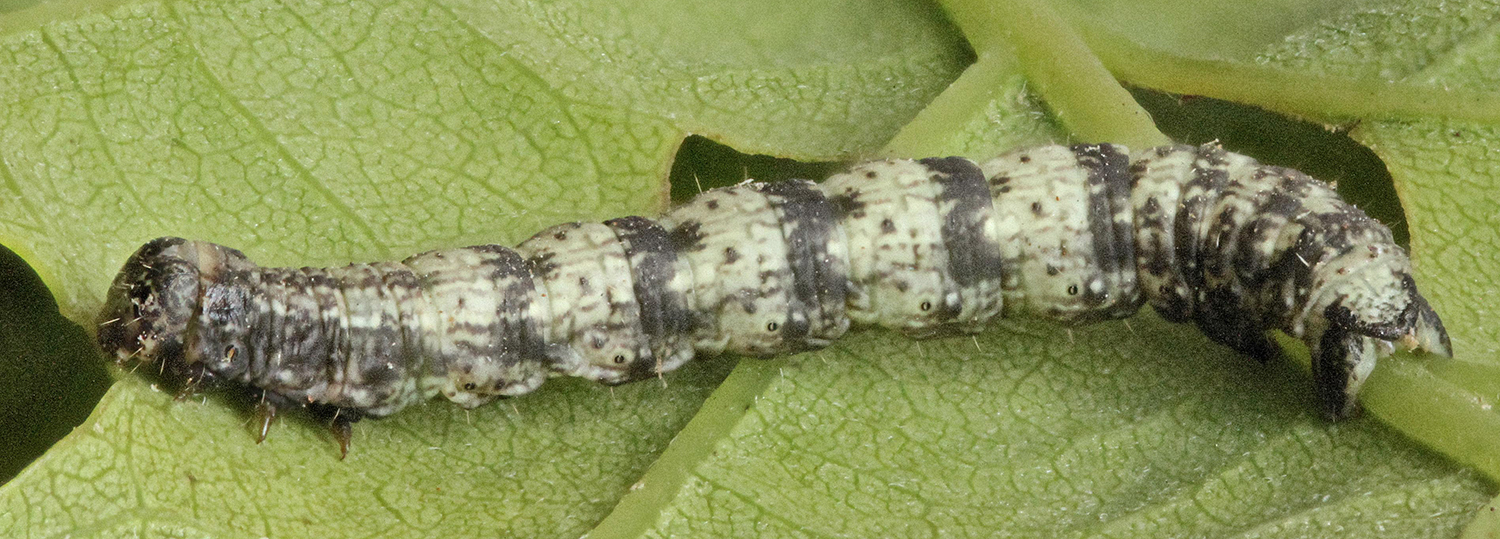
larva
