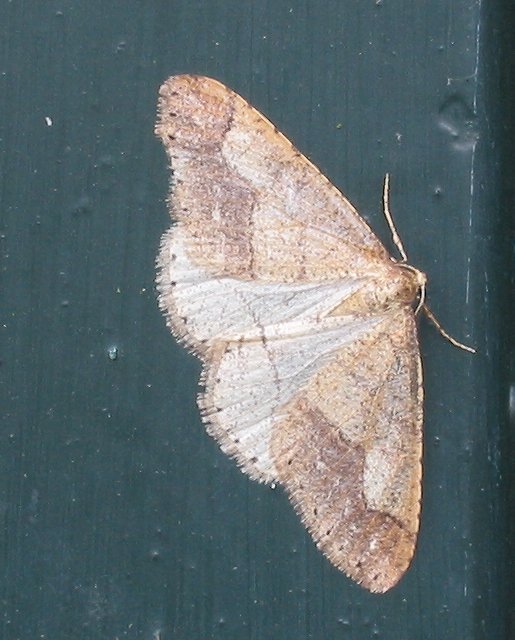

Scientific classification
- Kingdom: Animalia
- Phylum: Arthropoda
- Clade: Pancrustacea
- Class: Insecta
- Order: Lepidoptera
- Family: Geometridae
- Genus: Agriopis
- Species: A. marginaria

Binomial name
- Agriopis marginaria (Fabricius, 1776)

= Dotted border =

Species of moth

The dotted border (Agriopis marginaria) is a moth of the family Geometridae. The species was first described by Johan Christian Fabricius in 1776. It is found throughout Europe (except the far north), and the Near East.

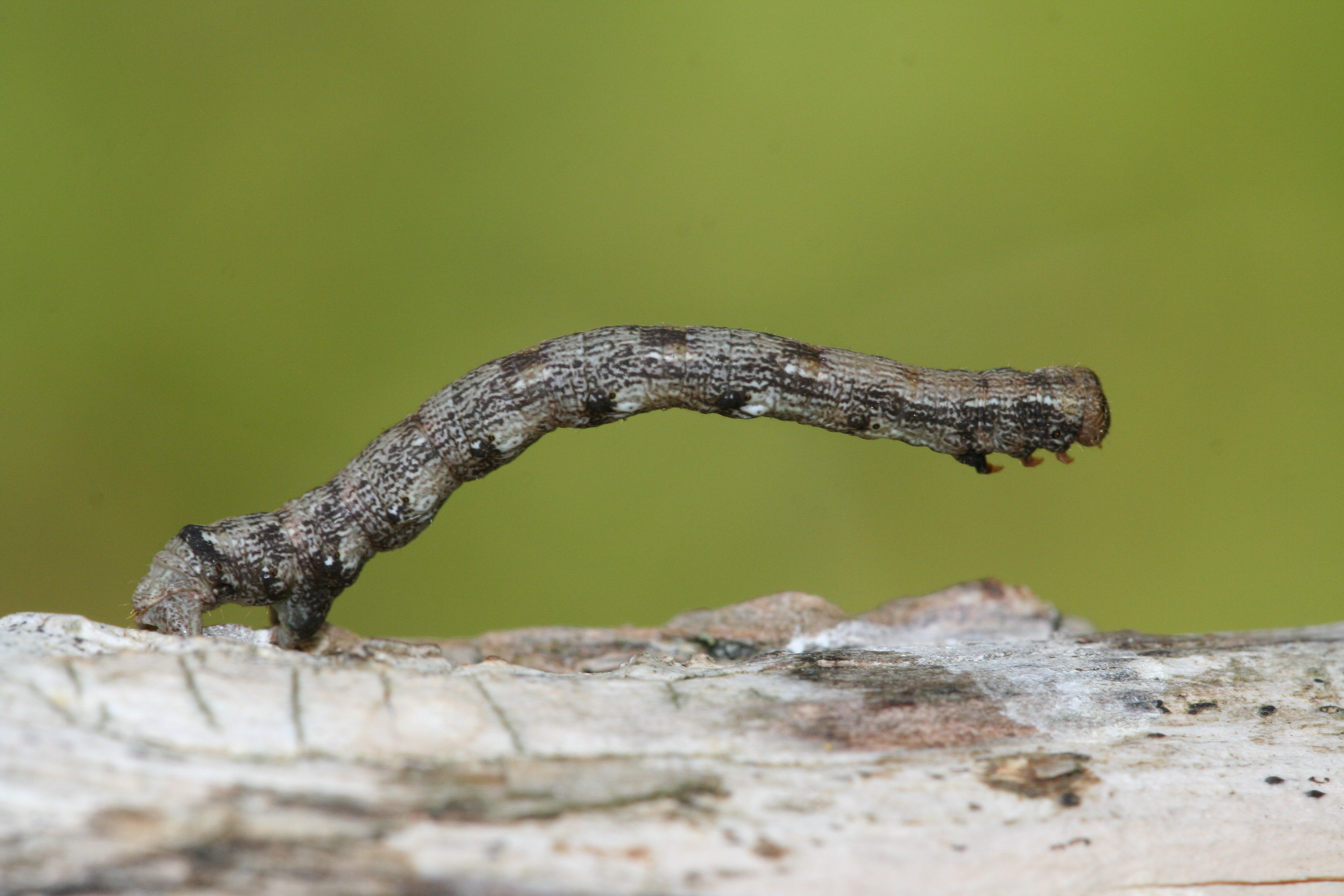
Dotted border caterpillar

The female of this species has only vestigial wings and is totally flightless. It is usually found resting on the trunks and branches of the larval food plants. The male has orange-brown forewings ( less orange than in aurantiaria with a paler yellowish band and a row of dots along the termen which gives it its common name. The hindwings are whitish with faint fascia. Melanic forms are frequently seen. The wingspan is 36–42 mm.

The adults are active from February to April, the male sometimes coming to light but not strongly attracted. The egg is ovate, greenish, becoming reddish on the upper side. The very variable larva is usually greenish-brown with dark cross-shaped markings along the back and feeds on a range of trees and shrubs (see list below). The species overwinters as a pupa.

1. The flight season refers to the British Isles. This may vary in other parts of the range.

== Recorded food plants ==
- Alnus - alder
- Betula - birch
- Corylus - hazel
- Crataegus - hawthorn
- Fagus - beech
- Malus - apple
- Prunus
- Quercus - oak
- Salix - willow
- Ulmus - elm

== Subspecies ==
- A. m. marginaria
- A. m. pallidata

== Similar species ==
- Agriopis aurantiaria
- Erannis defoliaria
