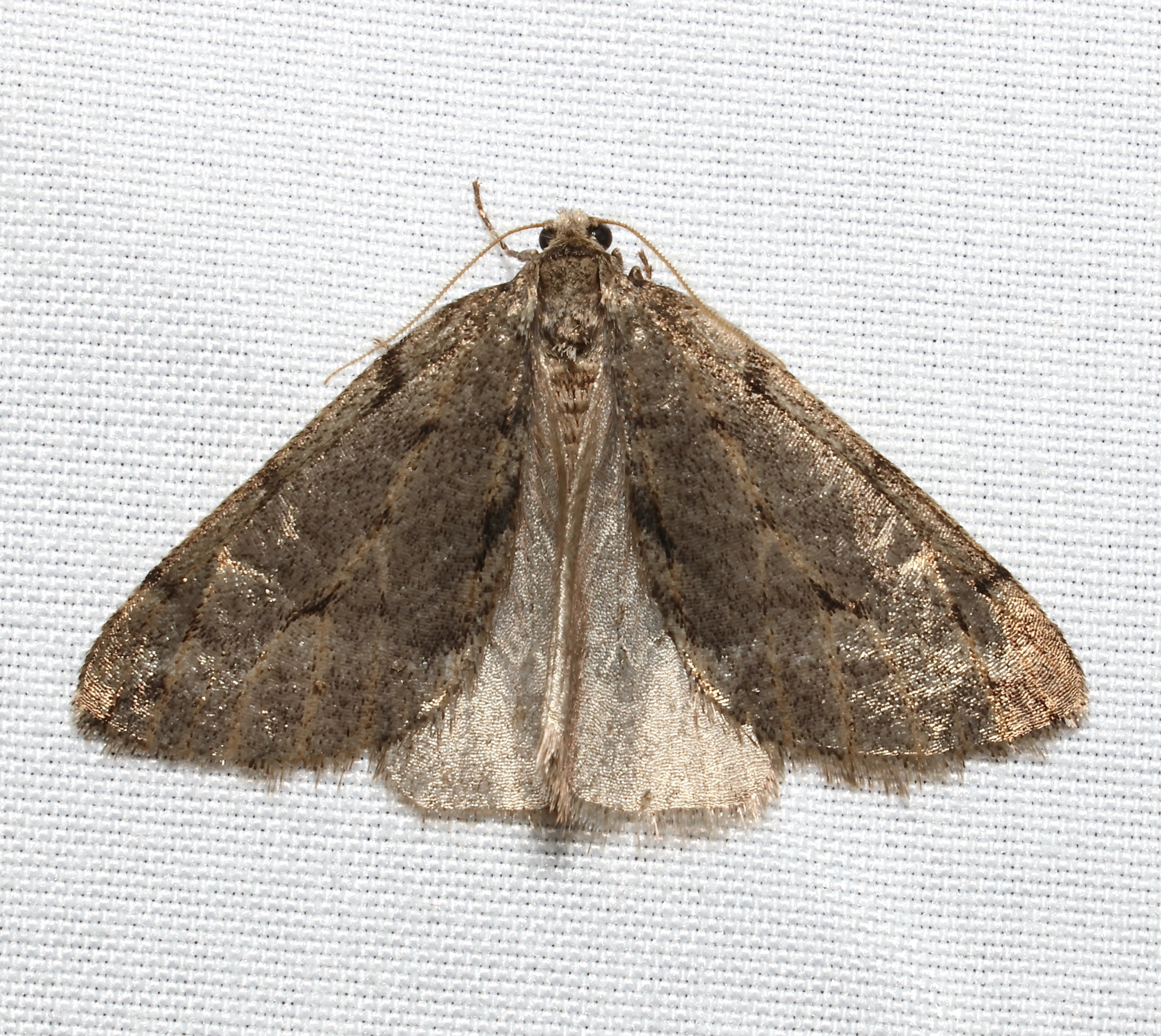

Scientific classification
- Kingdom: Animalia
- Phylum: Arthropoda
- Clade: Pancrustacea
- Class: Insecta
- Order: Lepidoptera
- Family: Geometridae
- Genus: Paleacrita
- Species: P. vernata

Binomial name
- Paleacrita vernata (Peck, 1795)

Synonyms
- Phalaena vernata Peck 1795; Paleacrita speciosa Hulst, 1898; Anisopteryx sericeiferata Walker, 1862; Paleacrita sericeiferata; Paleacrita autumnata Packard, 1876

= Paleacrita vernata =

Species of moth

Paleacrita vernata, the spring cankerworm, is a moth of the family Geometridae. The species was first described by William Dandridge Peck in 1795. It is found in North America from the Atlantic Ocean west to Alberta, Texas and California.

The length of the forewings is 11–18 mm for males. The females are wingless. Adult males are on wing from February to late May.

The larvae feed on various deciduous trees and shrubs, but especially Acer, Ulmus, Betula and Prunus species. Oaks (Quercus) are also affected, and many homeowners place sticky bands around trunks of their trees to trap the migrating adults as they climb the tree to lay eggs. The eggs hatch, turning into numerous inch-long worms that can defoliate and kill a tree. The worms often fall from the canopy onto passersby. Usually they are suspended by a line of silk that they can climb back into the tree along, should a spring wind dislodge them from their meal of leaves.

== Etymology ==
The specific name is derived from Latin vernus, "spring (attributive)".

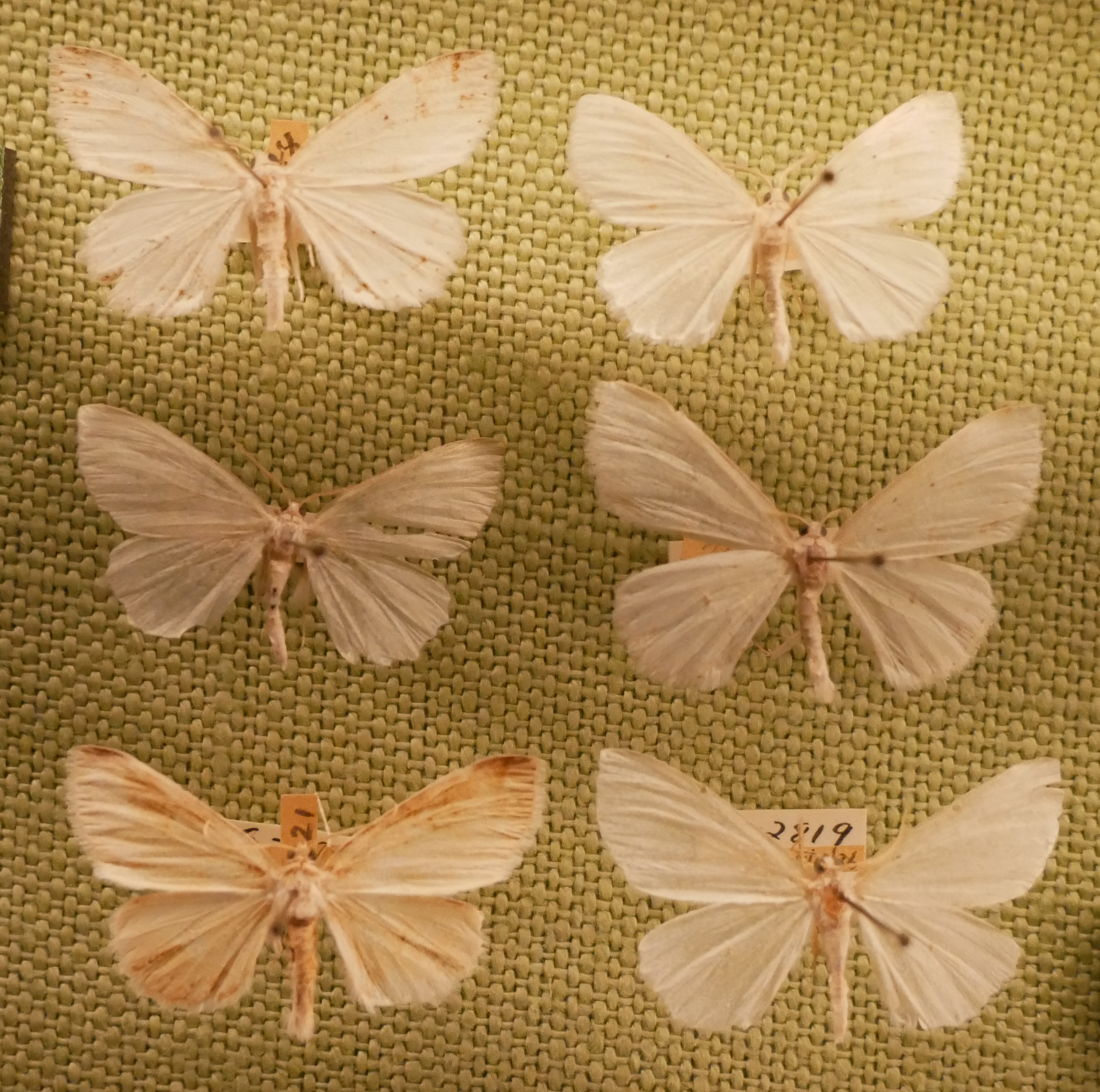
Paleacrita vernata
