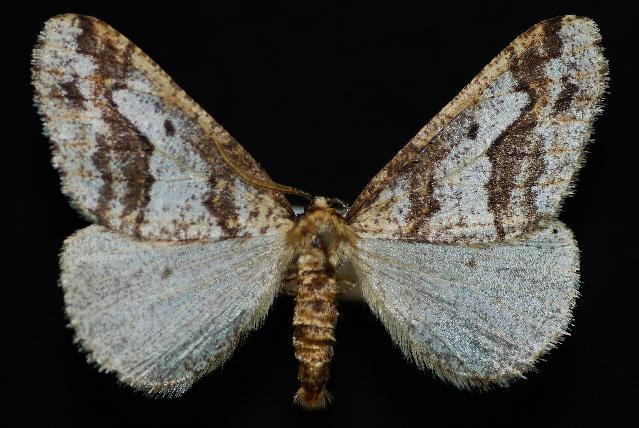

Scientific classification
- Kingdom: Animalia
- Phylum: Arthropoda
- Class: Insecta
- Order: Lepidoptera
- Family: Geometridae
- Genus: Erannis
- Species: E. vancouverensis

Binomial name
- Erannis vancouverensis Hulst, 1896

= Erannis vancouverensis =

Species of moth

Erannis vancouverensis is a species of geometrid moth in the family Geometridae.
