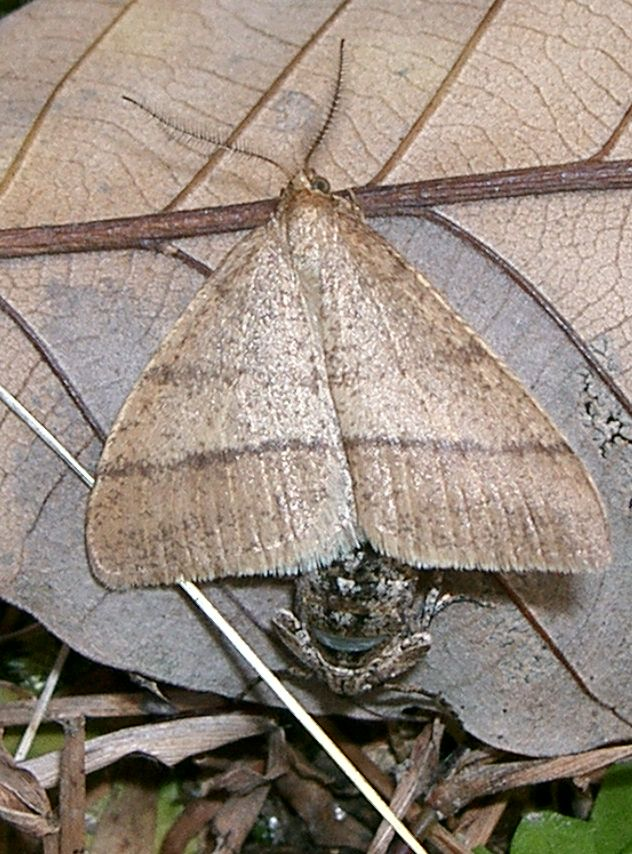
- Large-winged male above, stub-winged female below

Scientific classification
- Kingdom: Animalia
- Phylum: Arthropoda
- Class: Insecta
- Order: Lepidoptera
- Family: Geometridae
- Genus: Pachyerannis; Inoue, 1982
- Species: P. obliquaria

Binomial name
- Pachyerannis obliquaria (Motschulsky, 1860)

Synonyms
- Pachyerannis bela (Butler, 1878)

= Pachyerannis =

Genus of moths

Pachyerannis is a monotypic moth genus in the family Geometridae described by Inoue in 1982. Its only species, Pachyerannis obliquaria, first described by Victor Motschulsky in 1860, is known from Japan and the Russian Far East.

The wingspan is 24–30 mm.
