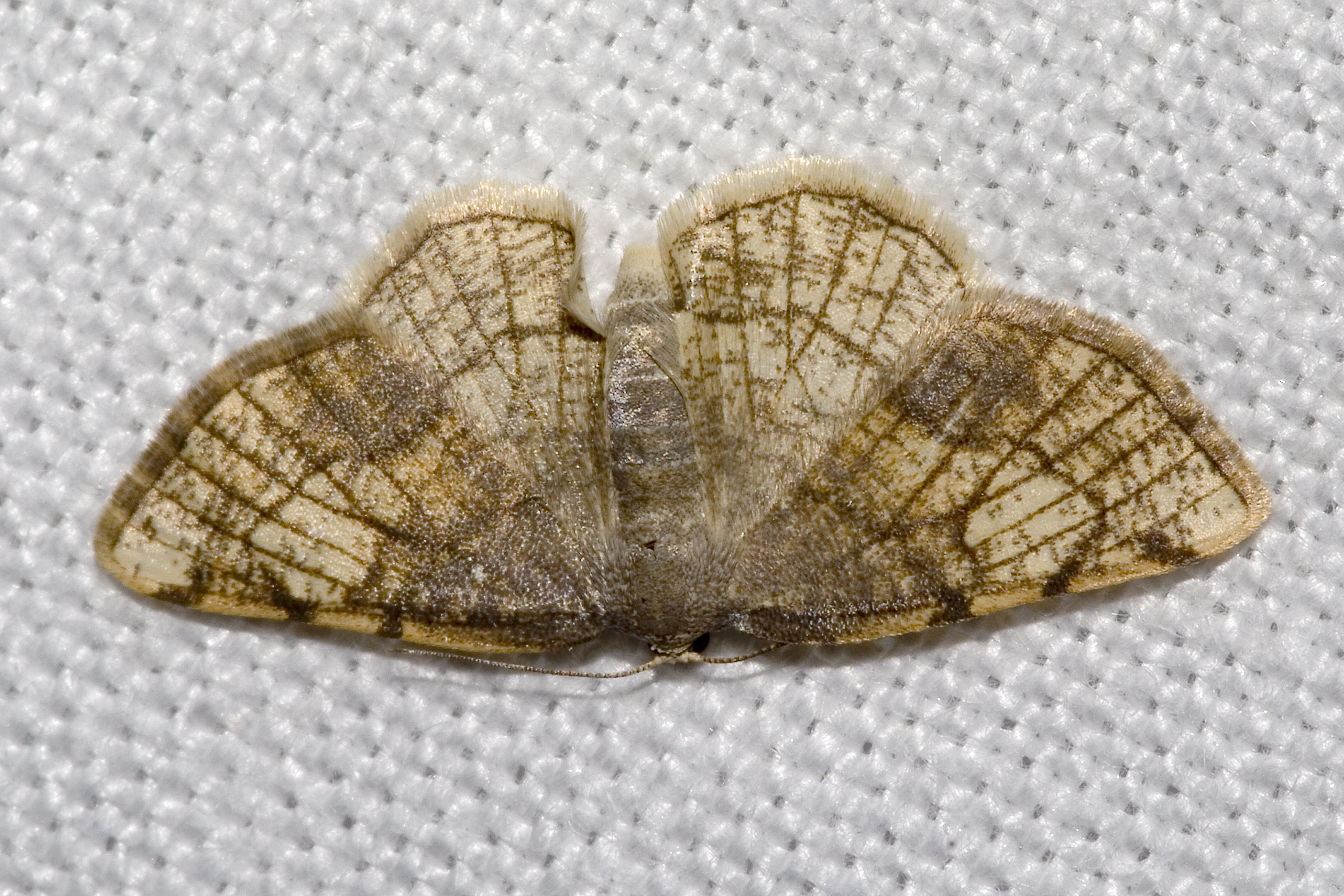
- The Dorset cream wave (Stegania trimaculata) is placed in the Cassymini by authors recognizing them as separate tribe

Scientific classification
- Kingdom: Animalia
- Phylum: Arthropoda
- Class: Insecta
- Order: Lepidoptera
- Family: Geometridae
- Subfamily: Ennominae
- Tribe: Abraxini; Warren, 1893

Genera
- Several, but see text

Synonyms
- Abraxinae Warren, 1893; Cassymini Holloway, 1994 (but see text); Pantheridae Moore, 1887; Pantherini Moore, 1887; Zerenini Duponchel, 1845; Zerenites Duponchel, 1845

= Abraxini =

Tribe of moths

The Abraxini are a tribe of geometer moths in the subfamily Ennominae. Here, the Cassymini are considered a specialized offshoot of the Abraxini and merged therein; some authors consider them a distinct tribe however.

== Genera ==
As numerous ennominae genera have not yet been assigned to a tribe, the genus list is preliminary. Most of the genera listed here would be placed in the Cassymini if these are considered separate.

- Abraxas
  - Magpie, Abraxas grossulariata
  - Clouded magpie, Abraxas sylvata
- Auzeodes
- Ballantiophora
- Berberodes
- Cassyma
- Danala
- Gyostega
- Heterostegane
- Hydatocapnia
- Leuciris
- Ligdia
  - Scorched carpet, Ligdia adustata
- Lomaspilis
  - Clouded border, Lomaspilis marginata
- Ninodes
- Orthocabera (tentatively placed here)
- Peratophyga
- Pristostegania
- Protitame
- Pycnostega
- Stegania
- Syngonorthus
- Xenostega
- Zamarada (tentatively placed here)

Heliomata, otherwise placed in the Macariini, might also belong here.
