= Z. exigua =

Z. exigua may refer to:

- Zamarada exigua, a geometer moth
- Zignoëlla exigua, a sac fungus
