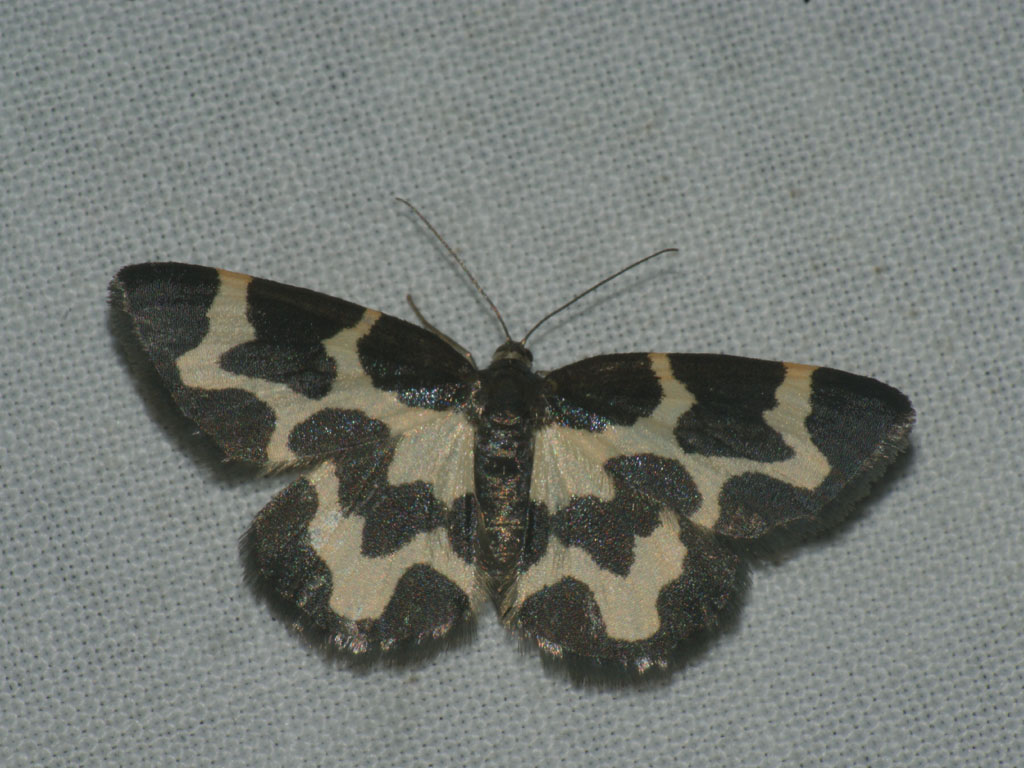

Scientific classification
- Domain: Eukaryota
- Kingdom: Animalia
- Phylum: Arthropoda
- Class: Insecta
- Order: Lepidoptera
- Family: Geometridae
- Genus: Lomaspilis
- Species: L. opis

Binomial name
- Lomaspilis opis Butler, 1878

= Lomaspilis opis =

Species of moth

Lomaspilis opis is a moth belonging to the family Geometridae. The species was first described by Arthur Gardiner Butler in 1878.

It is native to Eurasia.
