= Berberodes =

Scientific classification
- Kingdom: Animalia
- Phylum: Arthropoda
- Class: Insecta
- Order: Lepidoptera
- Family: Geometridae
- Tribe: Abraxini
- Genus: Berberodes; Guenée in Boisduval & Guenée, 1857

Genus of moths

Berberodes is a genus of moths in the family Geometridae erected by Achille Guenée in 1857.

== Species ==
- Berberodes conchylata Guenée, 1857 Brazil
- Berberodes impura Dyar, 1914 Panama
- Berberodes campylophleps Dyar, 1914 Panama
