= Heterostegane minax =

Scientific classification
- Kingdom: Animalia
- Phylum: Arthropoda
- Clade: Pancrustacea
- Class: Insecta
- Order: Lepidoptera
- Family: Geometridae
- Genus: Heterostegane
- Species: H. minax

Binomial name
- Heterostegane minax Prout, 1931

Synonyms
- Lomographa (Heterostegane) minax Prout, 1931

Species of moth

Heterostegane minax is a moth of the family Geometridae. It is found in West China.

It has a wingspan of 21–24 millimetres (0.83–0.94 in) and can be compared to Heterostegane cararia of which it has the same colours.
