= Syngonorthus =

Scientific classification
- Kingdom: Animalia
- Phylum: Arthropoda
- Clade: Pancrustacea
- Class: Insecta
- Order: Lepidoptera
- Family: Geometridae
- Tribe: Abraxini
- Genus: Syngonorthus; Butler, 1892
- Species: S. subpunctatus

Binomial name
- Syngonorthus subpunctatus Butler, 1892

Synonyms
- Pristostegania bilineata Warren, 1897

Genus of moths

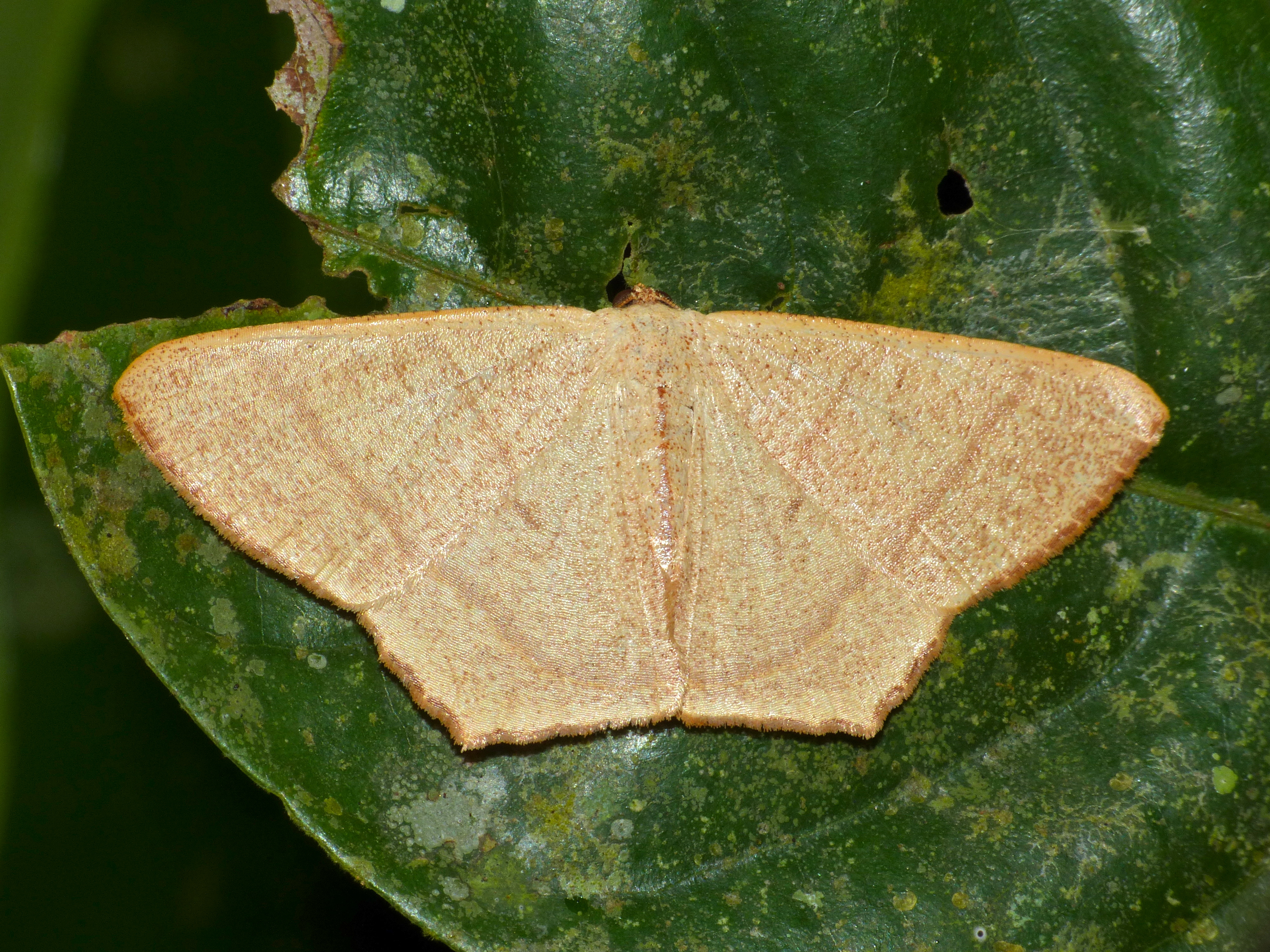
Syngonorthus subpunctatus,Sarawak, Malaysia

Syngonorthus is a monotypic moth genus in the family Geometridae. Its only species, Syngonorthus subpunctatus, is found in Borneo and Sumatra. Both the genus and species were described by Arthur Gardiner Butler in 1892.
