= Danala =

Scientific classification
- Kingdom: Animalia
- Phylum: Arthropoda
- Class: Insecta
- Order: Lepidoptera
- Family: Geometridae
- Tribe: Abraxini
- Genus: Danala; Walker, 1860

Genus of moths

Danala is a genus of moths in the family Geometridae.

== Species ==
- Danala laxtaria Walker, 1860
- Danala lilacina (Wileman, 1915)
