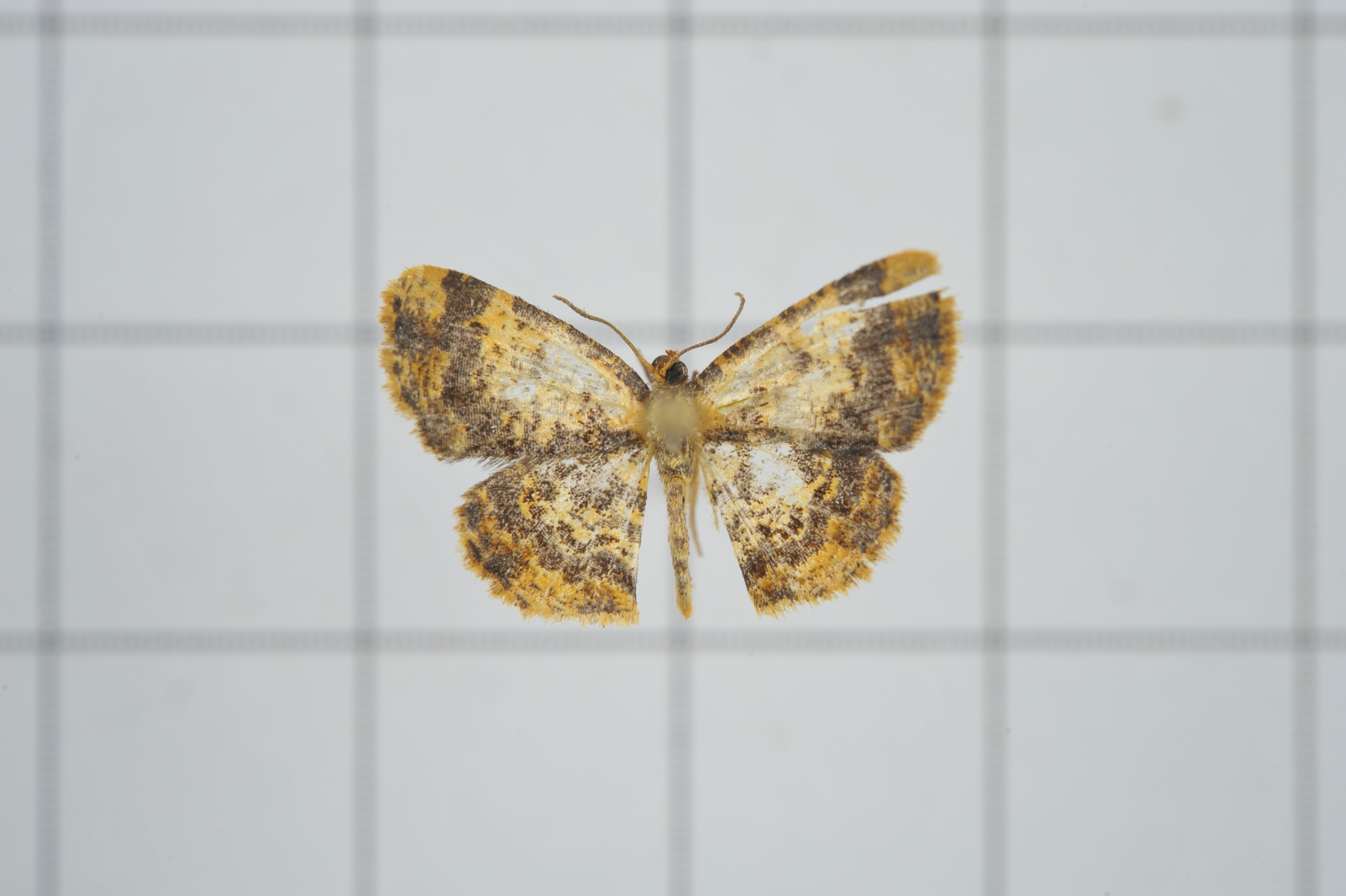
- Ninodes splendens

Scientific classification
- Kingdom: Animalia
- Phylum: Arthropoda
- Class: Insecta
- Order: Lepidoptera
- Family: Geometridae
- Tribe: Abraxini
- Genus: Ninodes; Warren, 1894

= Ninodes =

Genus of moths

Ninodes is a genus of moths in the family Geometridae. The genus was erected by William Warren in 1894.

== Species ==
- Ninodes flavimedia Warren, 1907
- Ninodes splendens Butler, 1878 (Japan)
- Ninodes watanabei Inoue, 1976 (Japan)
