= Orthocabera =

Scientific classification
- Kingdom: Animalia
- Phylum: Arthropoda
- Class: Insecta
- Order: Lepidoptera
- Family: Geometridae
- Subfamily: Ennominae
- Tribe: Abraxini
- Genus: Orthocabera; Butler, 1879

Synonyms
- Microniodes Hampson, 1893 (preocc.)

Genus of moths

Orthocabera is a genus of moths in the family Geometridae.

== Species ==
- Orthocabera cymodegma (Prout, 1929)
- Orthocabera fuscolineata (Swinhoe, 1894)
- Orthocabera luteifrons (Swinhoe, 1894)
- Orthocabera minor (West, 1929)
- Orthocabera moupinaria (Oberthur, 1911)
- Orthocabera obliqua (Hampson, 1893)
- Orthocabera ocernaria (Swinhoe, 1893)
- Orthocabera opalescens (West, 1929)
- Orthocabera sericea Butler, 1879
- Orthocabera similaria (Swinhoe, 1915)
- Orthocabera sublavata (Prout, 1929)
- Orthocabera subvitrea (Hampson, 1895)
- Orthocabera tinagmaria (Guenée, 1858)
