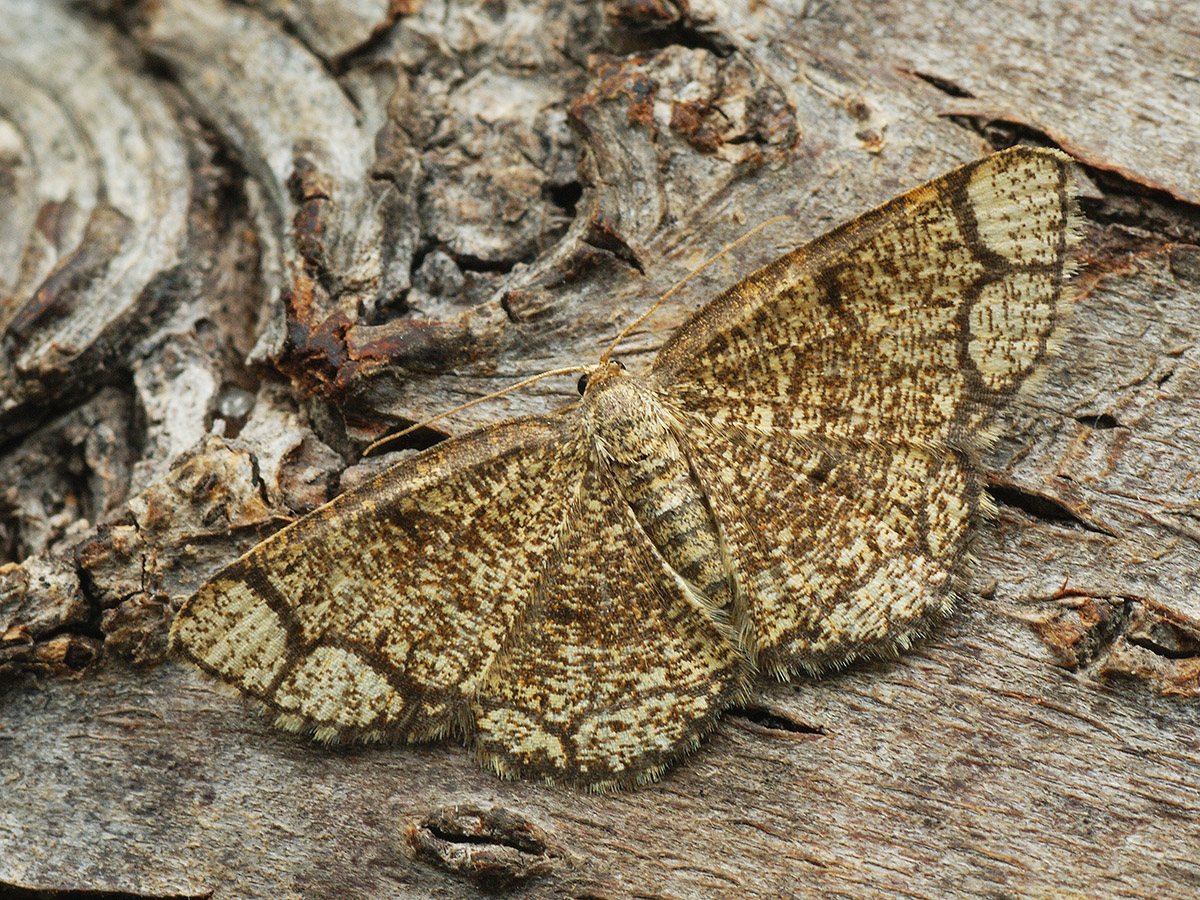

Scientific classification
- Domain: Eukaryota
- Kingdom: Animalia
- Phylum: Arthropoda
- Class: Insecta
- Order: Lepidoptera
- Family: Geometridae
- Genus: Stegania
- Species: S. cararia

Binomial name
- Stegania cararia (Hubner, 1790)

Synonyms
- Phalaena cararia Hubner, 1790

= Stegania cararia =

Species of moth

Stegania cararia, the ringed border, is a species of moth of the family Geometridae.

== Distribution ==
It is found from France east to Russia. It is an immigrant in Great Britain.

== Biology ==
The habitat consists of damp forested areas. The larvae feed on poplar (Populus species), including aspen (Populus tremula). Larvae can be found from July to October.

== Description ==
The wingspan is 20–23 mm. Adults are on wing from May to mid-July in one generation per year.

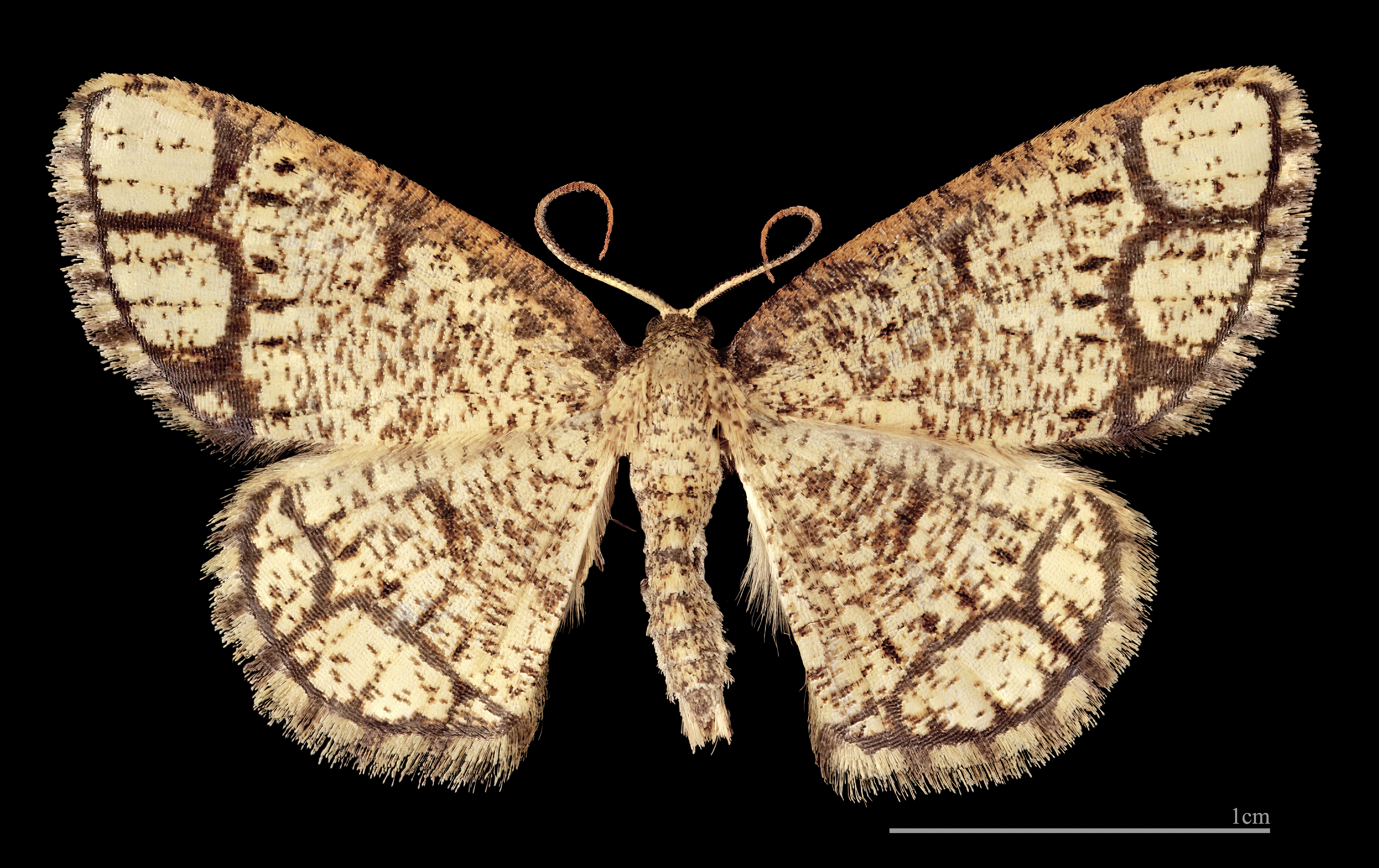
♂

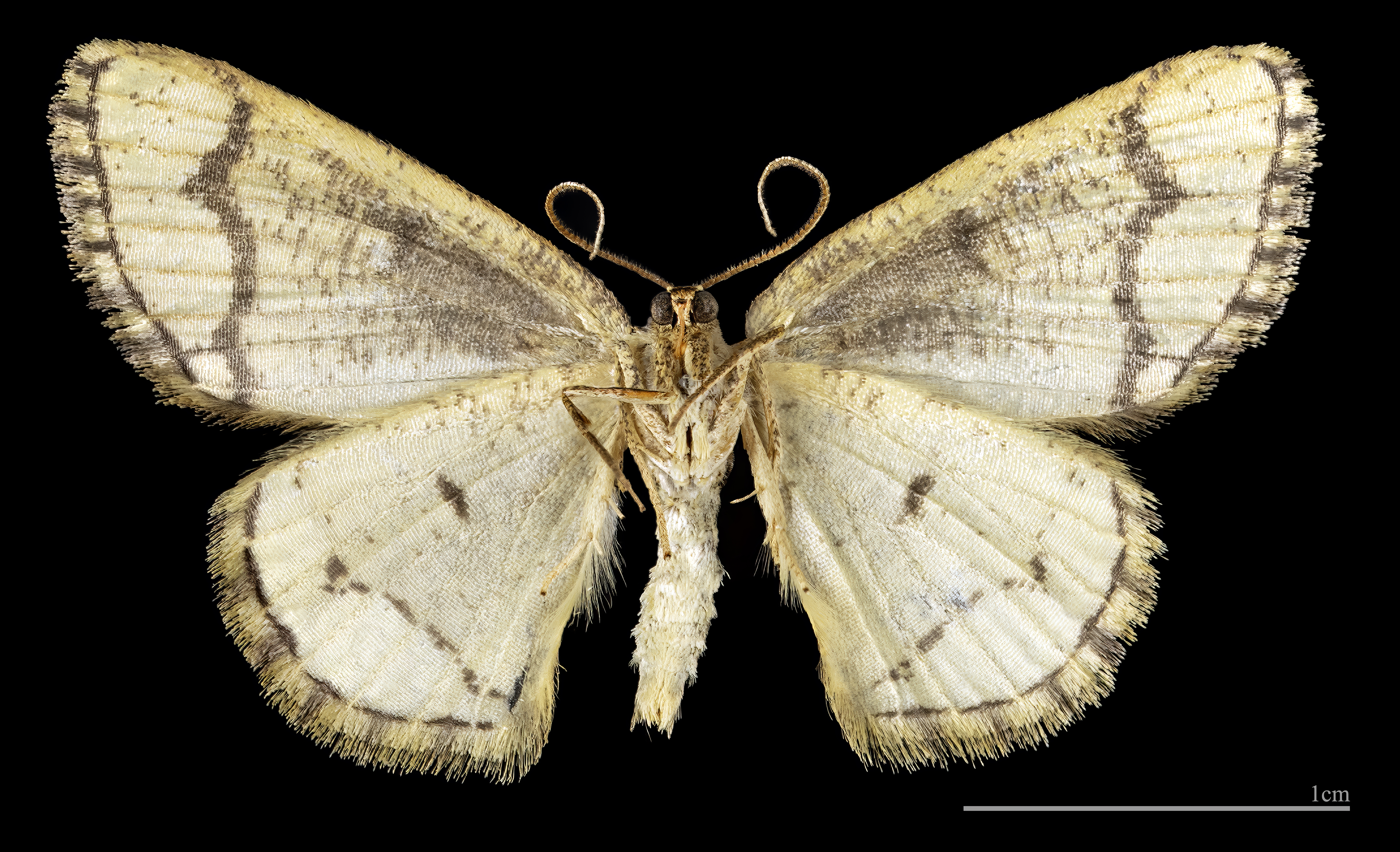
♂ △
