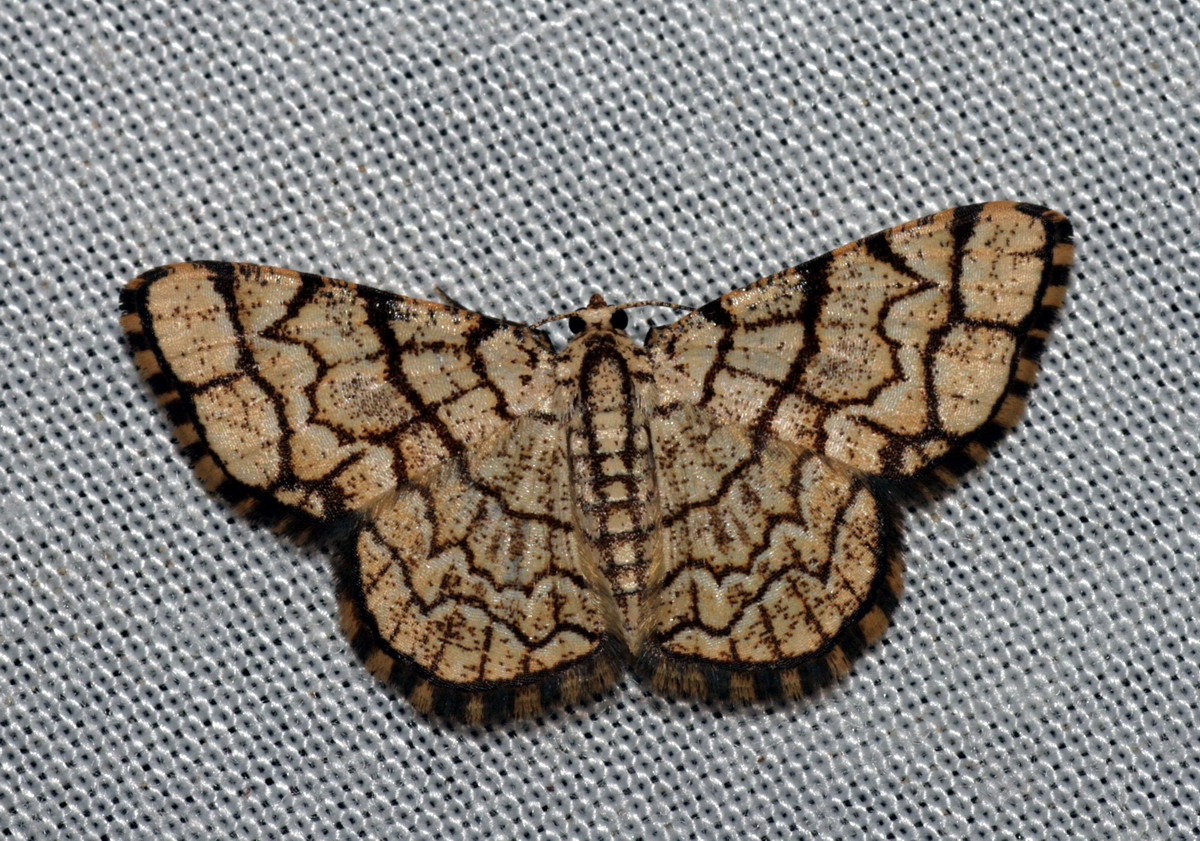

Scientific classification
- Kingdom: Animalia
- Phylum: Arthropoda
- Clade: Pancrustacea
- Class: Insecta
- Order: Lepidoptera
- Family: Geometridae
- Genus: Heterostegane
- Species: H. warreni

Binomial name
- Heterostegane warreni (Prout, 1932)

Synonyms
- Lomographa warreni Prout, 1932; Heterostegane quadrilineata Warren, 1894

= Heterostegane warreni =

Species of moth

Heterostegane warreni is a moth of the family Geometridae. It is found in Peninsular Malaysia, Borneo and Sumatra.
