= Zamarada differens =

Scientific classification
- Domain: Eukaryota
- Kingdom: Animalia
- Phylum: Arthropoda
- Class: Insecta
- Order: Lepidoptera
- Family: Geometridae
- Genus: Zamarada
- Species: Z. differens

Binomial name
- Zamarada differens (Bastelberger, 1907)

Synonyms
- Zamarada pandatilinea Prout, 1916

Species of moth

Zamarada differens is a moth of the family Geometridae first described by Max Bastelberger in 1907. It is found in subtropical Africa and is known from the Central African Republic, Chad, the Comoros, Kenya, Malawi, Mozambique, South Africa, Tanzania, Uganda, Zambia and Zimbabwe.

The forewings and hindwings of this species are yellow greenish and it has a wingspan of 20 mm.
