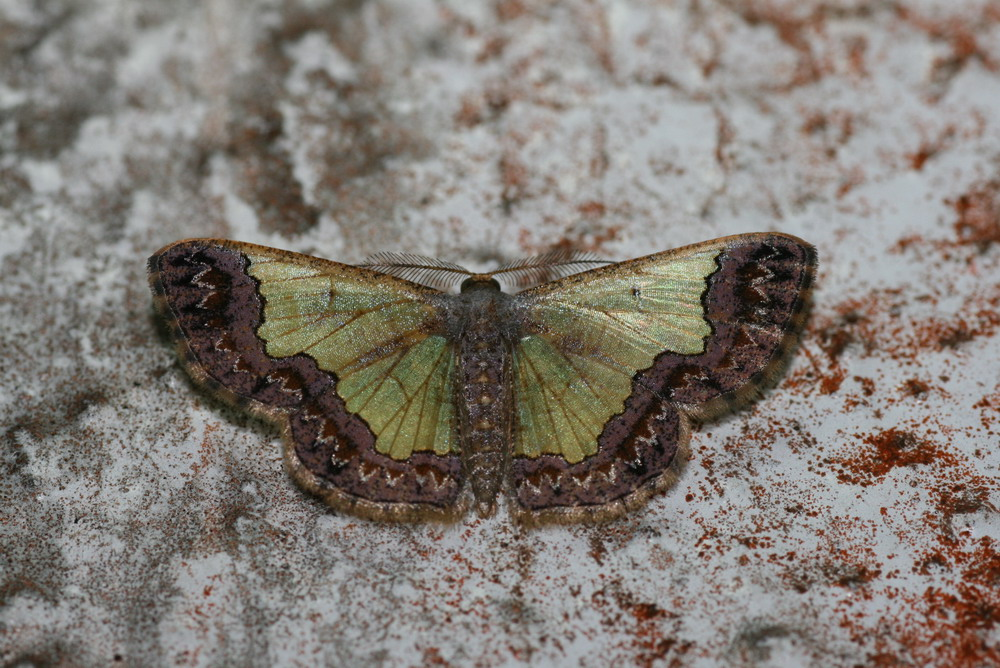

Scientific classification
- Kingdom: Animalia
- Phylum: Arthropoda
- Class: Insecta
- Order: Lepidoptera
- Family: Geometridae
- Subfamily: Ennominae
- Tribe: Cassymini
- Genus: Zamarada; Moore, 1887

= Zamarada =

Genus of moths

Zamarada is a genus of moths in the family Geometridae, first described by Frederic Moore in 1887. The species type is Zamarada translucida. Over 250 species and 35 subspecies (including nominates) have been listed.

== Description ==
Moths in this genus have short, porrect palpi and roughly scaled with bipectinate (comb like on both sides) antennae that present with longer branches in male than female moths. Their hind tibia are not dilated. Forewings with vein 3 from angle of cell. Veins 7 to 9 stalked from upper angle and vein 10 absent. Vein 11 free. Hindwings with vein 3 from angle of cell.

== Selected species ==
- Zamarada aureomarginata
- Zamarada baliata (Felder & Rogenhofer, 1875)
- Zamarada denticulata D. S. Fletcher, 1974
- Zamarada differens
- Zamarada eogenaria (Snellen, 1881)
- Zamarada eucharis
- Zamarada exigua
- Zamarada metallicata Warren, 1914
- Zamarada nesiotica D. S. Fletcher, 1974
- Zamarada scriptifasciata (Walker, 1862)
- Zamarada ucatoides Holloway
