= Heterostegane aurantiaca =

Scientific classification
- Kingdom: Animalia
- Phylum: Arthropoda
- Clade: Pancrustacea
- Class: Insecta
- Order: Lepidoptera
- Family: Geometridae
- Genus: Heterostegane
- Species: H. aurantiaca

Binomial name
- Heterostegane aurantiaca Warren, 1894

Species of moth

Heterostegane aurantiaca is a moth of the family Geometridae first described by Warren in 1894. It is found in the Khasi Hills of India and probably in Sri Lanka.
