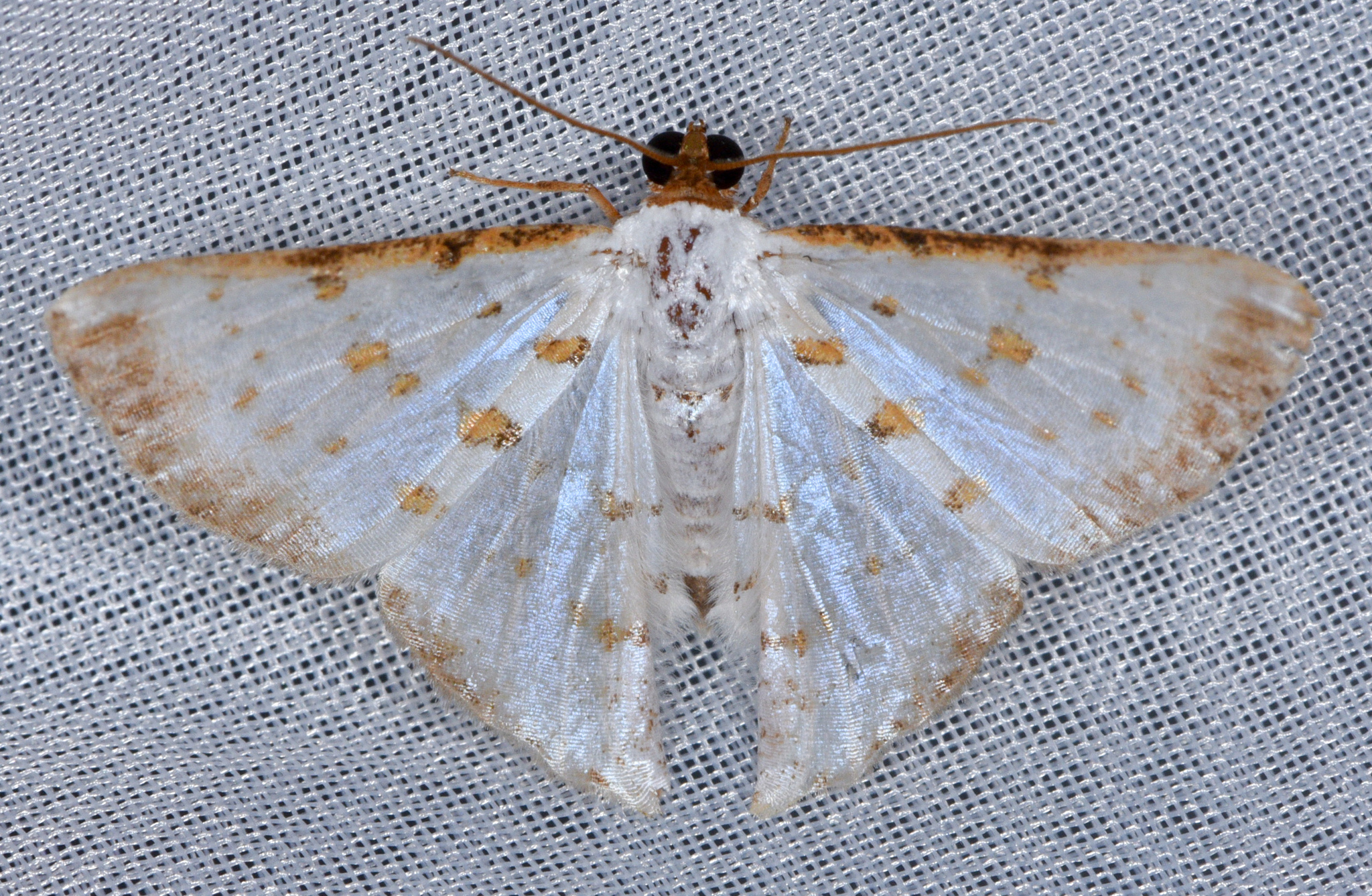
- Ballantiophora gibbiferata

Scientific classification
- Kingdom: Animalia
- Phylum: Arthropoda
- Clade: Pancrustacea
- Class: Insecta
- Order: Lepidoptera
- Family: Geometridae
- Tribe: Abraxini
- Genus: Ballantiophora; Butler, 1881

= Ballantiophora =

Genus of moths

Ballantiophora is a genus of moths in the family Geometridae.

== Species ==
- Ballantiophora gibbiferata (Guenée, 1857)
- Ballantiophora innotata Warren, 1894
