= Orthocabera obliqua =

Scientific classification
- Kingdom: Animalia
- Phylum: Arthropoda
- Clade: Pancrustacea
- Class: Insecta
- Order: Lepidoptera
- Family: Geometridae
- Genus: Orthocabera
- Species: O. obliqua

Binomial name
- Orthocabera obliqua (Hampson, 1893)

Synonyms
- Microniodes obliqua Hampson, 1893

Species of moth

Orthocabera obliqua is a moth of the family Geometridae first described by George Hampson in 1893. It is found in Sri Lanka.
