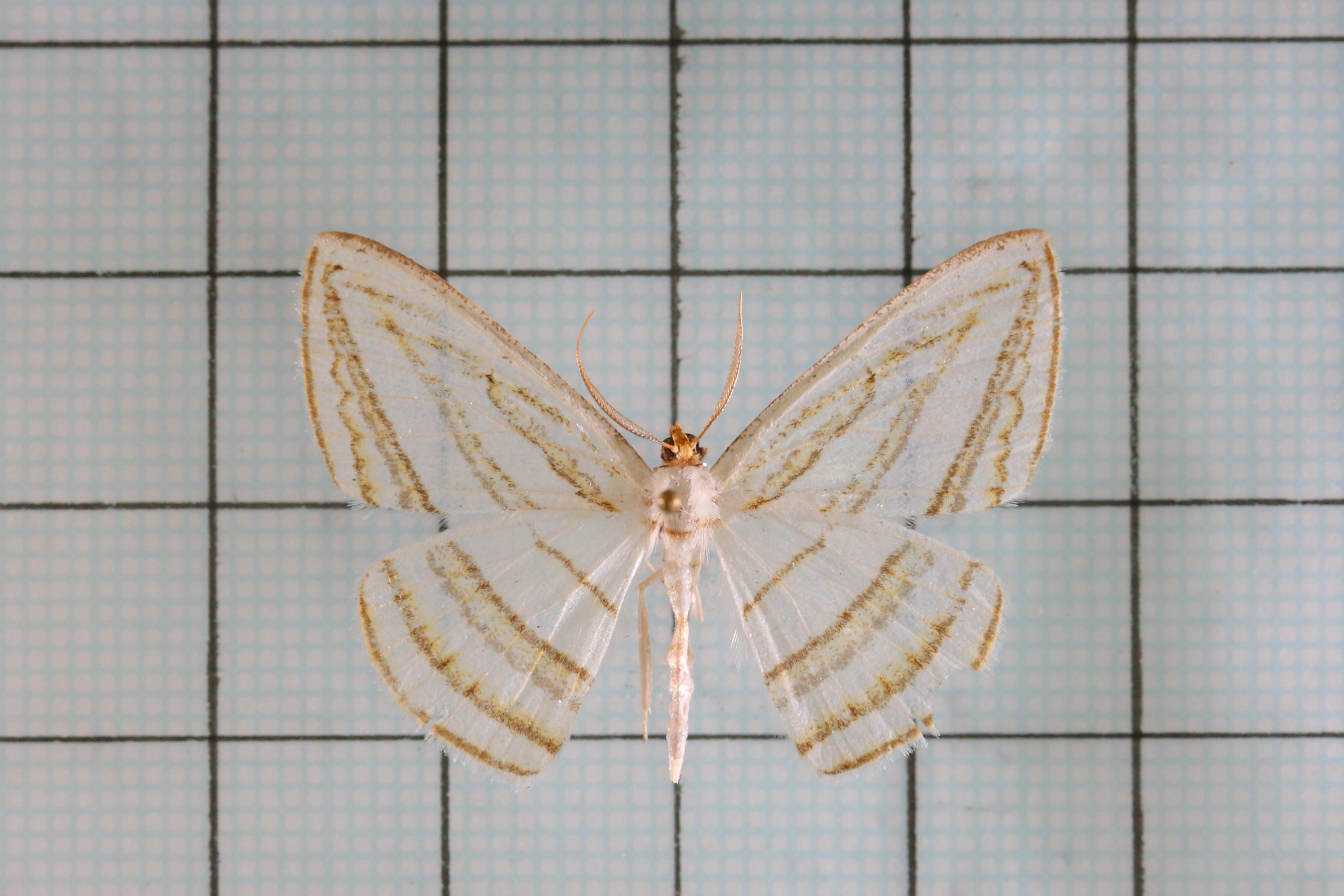
- Mounted
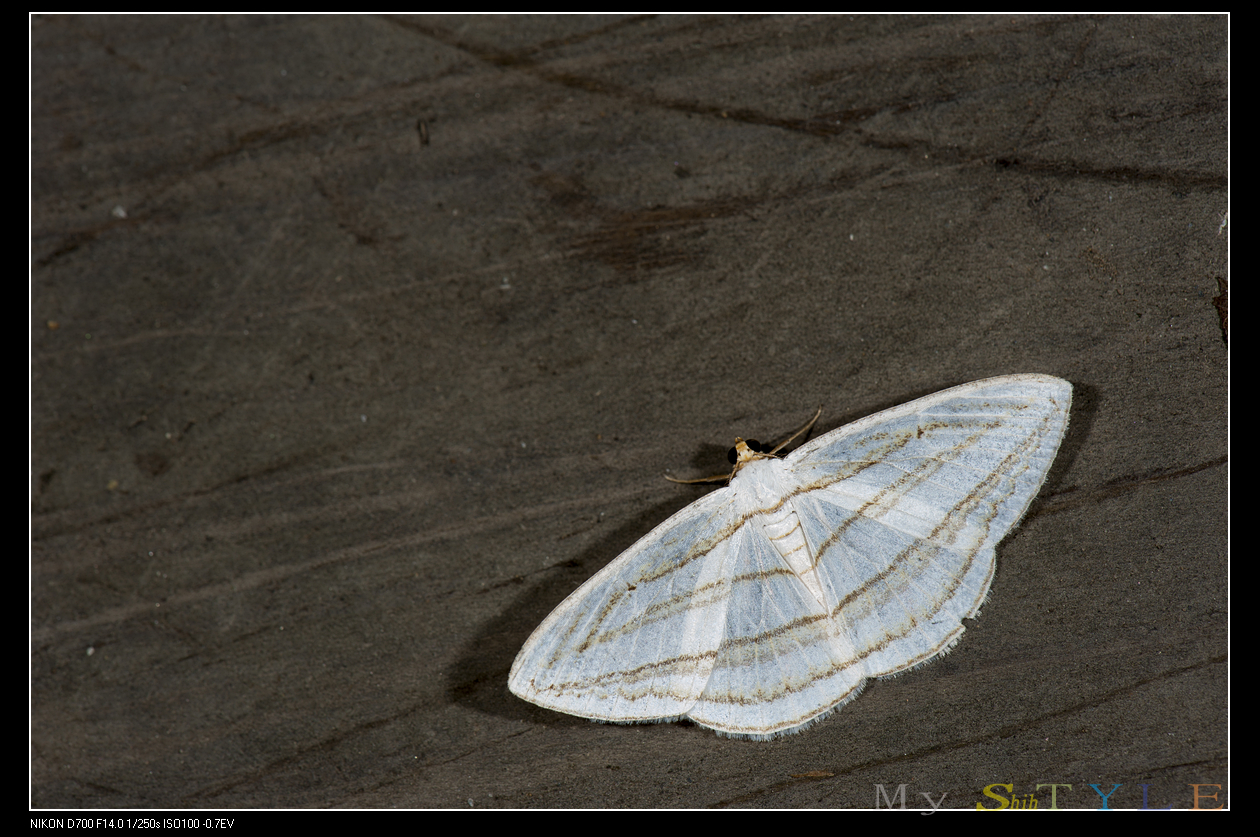
- Living

Scientific classification
- Domain: Eukaryota
- Kingdom: Animalia
- Phylum: Arthropoda
- Class: Insecta
- Order: Lepidoptera
- Family: Geometridae
- Genus: Orthocabera
- Species: O. sericea

Binomial name
- Orthocabera sericea Butler, 1879

Synonyms
- Myrteta sericea; Orthocabera brunneiceps Warren, 1893

= Orthocabera sericea =

Species of moth

Orthocabera sericea is a species of moth of the family Geometridae first described by Arthur Gardiner Butler in 1879. It is found from the Himalayas to Taiwan and Japan.

The wingspan is 23–30 mm.

== Subspecies ==
- Orthocabera sericea sericea (Japan)
- Orthocabera sericea brunneiceps Warren, 1893
