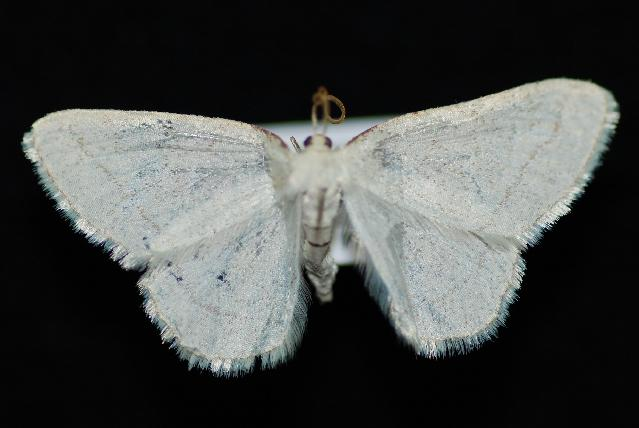

Scientific classification
- Kingdom: Animalia
- Phylum: Arthropoda
- Clade: Pancrustacea
- Class: Insecta
- Order: Lepidoptera
- Family: Geometridae
- Genus: Protitame
- Species: P. subalbaria

Binomial name
- Protitame subalbaria (Packard, 1873)

Synonyms
- Protitame matilda (Dyar, 1904); Protitame pallicolor (Dyar, 1923)

= Protitame subalbaria =

Species of moth

Protitame subalbaria is a species of geometrid moth in the family Geometridae.

The MONA or Hodges number for Protitame subalbaria is 6266.
