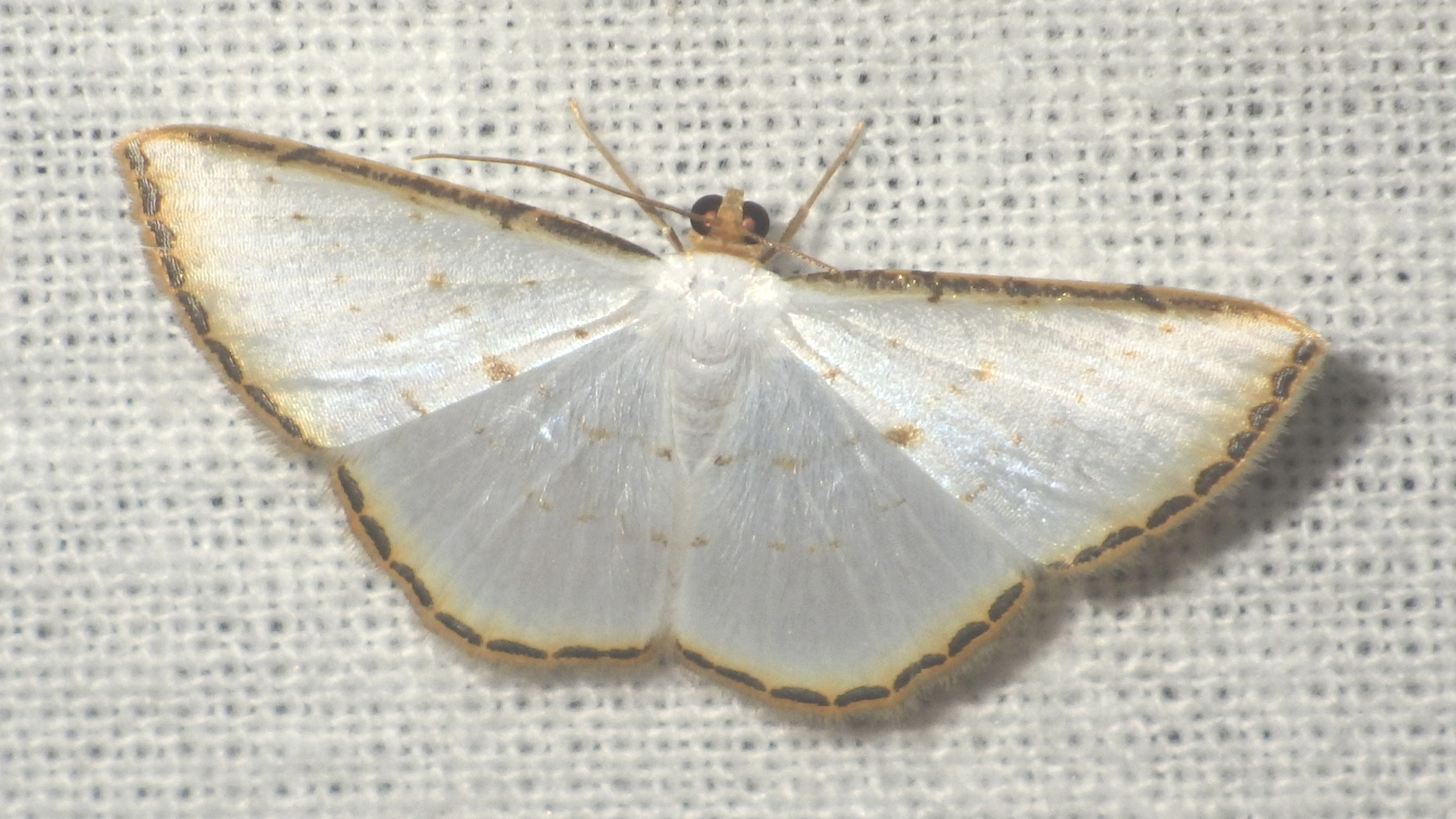

Scientific classification
- Kingdom: Animalia
- Phylum: Arthropoda
- Clade: Pancrustacea
- Class: Insecta
- Order: Lepidoptera
- Family: Geometridae
- Tribe: Abraxini
- Genus: Leuciris; Warren, 1894

= Leuciris =

Genus of moths

Leuciris is a genus of moths in the family Geometridae. The genus was first described by Warren in 1894.

== Species ==
- Leuciris fimbriaria (Stoll, [1781]) Suriname
- Leuciris distorta (Warren, 1894) Amazon basin
