= Zamarada baliata =

Scientific classification
- Kingdom: Animalia
- Phylum: Arthropoda
- Clade: Pancrustacea
- Class: Insecta
- Order: Lepidoptera
- Family: Geometridae
- Genus: Zamarada
- Species: Z. baliata

Binomial name
- Zamarada baliata (Felder, 1874)

Synonyms
- Euchloris baliata Felder & Rogenhofer, 1875; Zamarada translucida Moore, 1887; Zamarada baliata Felder; Holloway, 1976

Species of moth

Zamarada baliata is a moth of the family Geometridae first described by Felder in 1874. It is found in Sundaland and most likely in India and Sri Lanka.

A reddish colour is confined to the outer parts and interior to the fine pale submarginal. The host plant of the caterpillar is Cassia fistula.
