= Pycnostega =

Scientific classification
- Domain: Eukaryota
- Kingdom: Animalia
- Phylum: Arthropoda
- Class: Insecta
- Order: Lepidoptera
- Family: Geometridae
- Tribe: Abraxini
- Genus: Pycnostega

Genus of moths

Pycnostega is a genus of moths in the family Geometridae.
