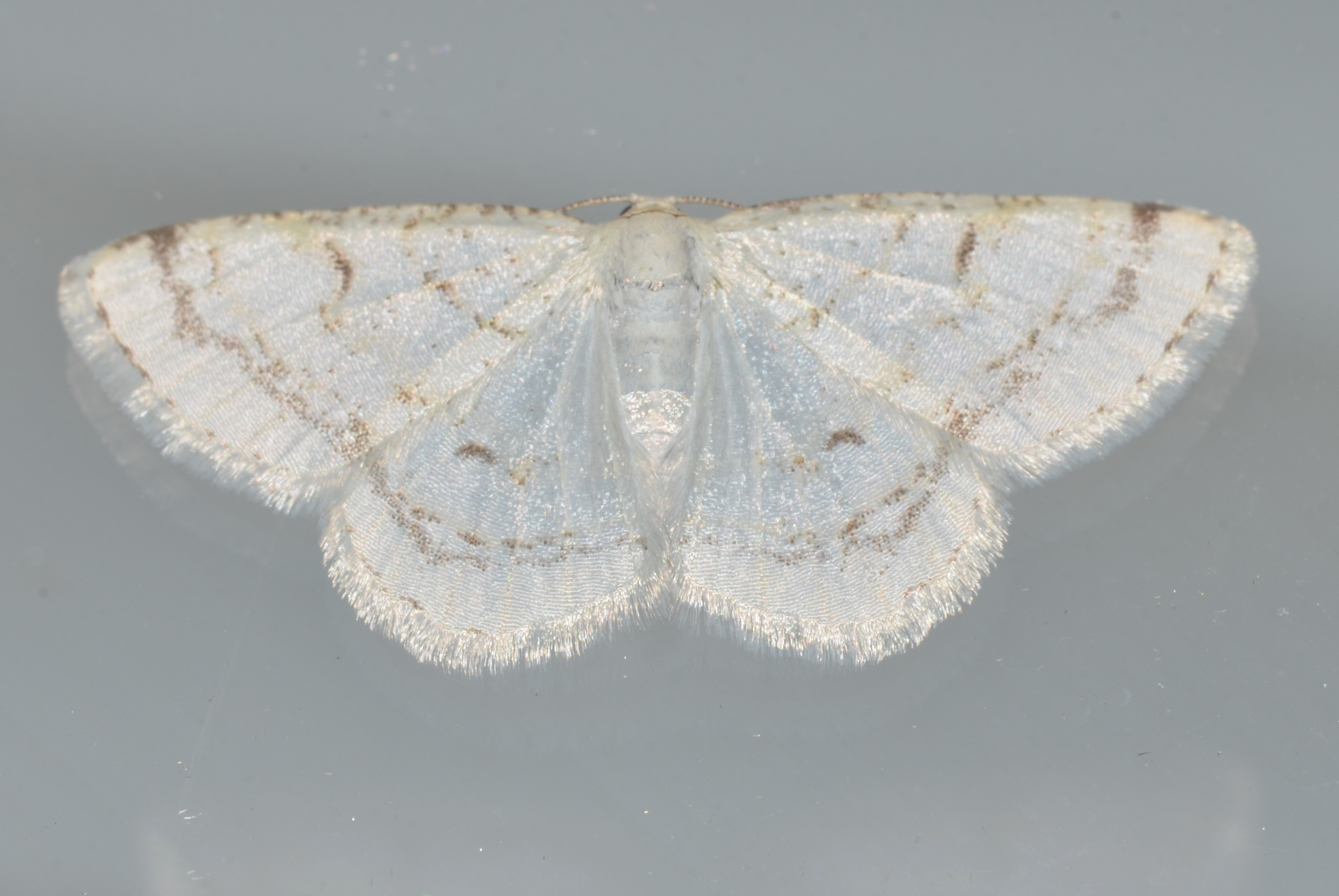

Scientific classification
- Kingdom: Animalia
- Phylum: Arthropoda
- Clade: Pancrustacea
- Class: Insecta
- Order: Lepidoptera
- Family: Geometridae
- Genus: Protitame
- Species: P. virginalis

Binomial name
- Protitame virginalis (Hulst, 1900)

Synonyms
- Protitame albescens McDunnough, 1939; Protitame discalis McDunnough, 1939; Protitame hulstiaria (Taylor, 1906)

= Protitame virginalis =

Species of moth

Protitame virginalis, the virgin moth, is a moth in the family Geometridae. The species was first described by George Duryea Hulst in 1900. It is found in North America.

The MONA or Hodges number for Protitame virginalis is 6270.
