= Heterostegane ruberata =

Scientific classification
- Domain: Eukaryota
- Kingdom: Animalia
- Phylum: Arthropoda
- Class: Insecta
- Order: Lepidoptera
- Family: Geometridae
- Genus: Heterostegane
- Species: H. ruberata

Binomial name
- Heterostegane ruberata (Mabille, 1900)

Synonyms
- Lomographa synclines Prout, 1932; Stegania ruberata Mabille, 1900

Species of moth

Heterostegane ruberata is a moth of the family Geometridae. It is found in Madagascar.

It has a wingspan of 17–18 mm. The forewings are rather broad with the apex round-pointed, whitish buff, coarsely and profusely irrorated with ochraceous-tawny. The underside is pale, with slight suffusions but without irrorations.
