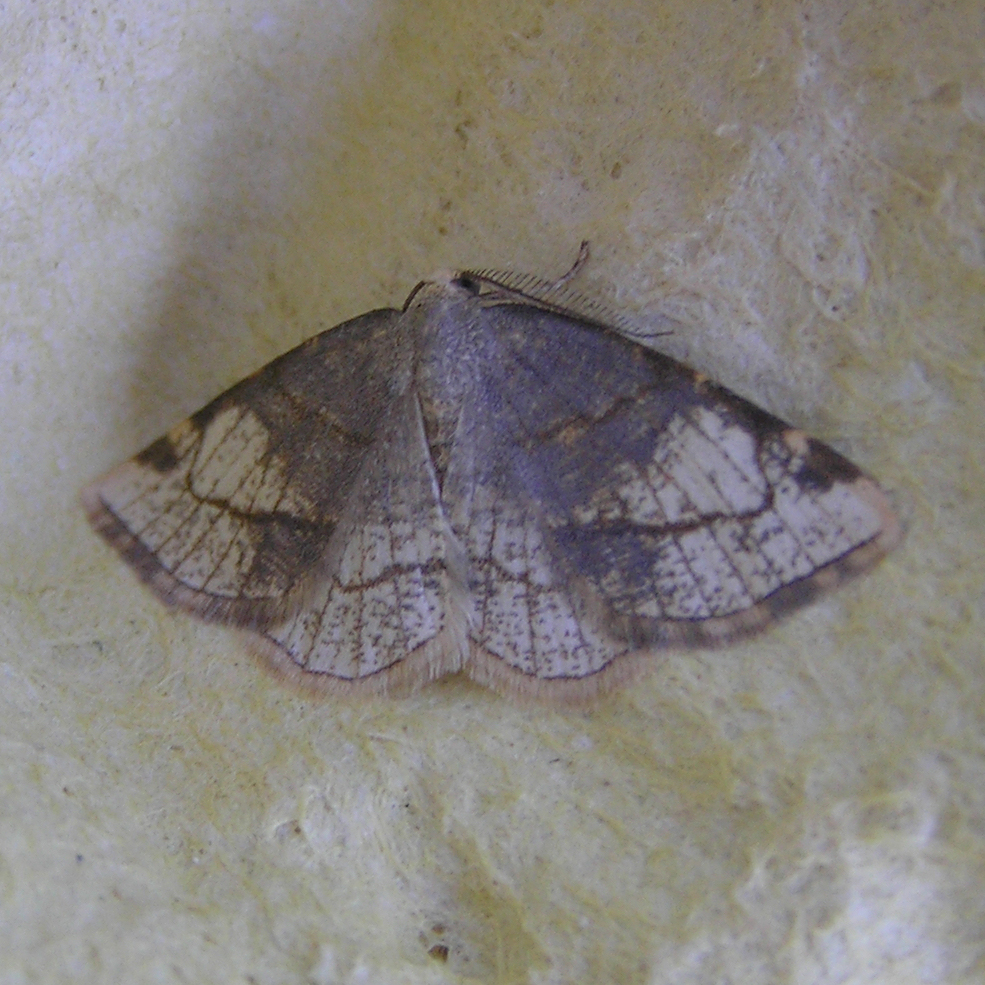
- Stegania trimaculata

Scientific classification
- Kingdom: Animalia
- Phylum: Arthropoda
- Class: Insecta
- Order: Lepidoptera
- Family: Geometridae
- Tribe: Abraxini
- Genus: Stegania; Guenée, 1845

Synonyms
- Calomicta Gumppenberg, 1887; Eustegania Gumppenberg, 1887; Terpnomicta Lederer, 1853

= Stegania =

Genus of moths

Stegania is a genus of moths in the family Geometridae. It was erected by Achille Guenée in 1845.

== Description ==
The palpi are minute, slender, porrect (extending forward) and hairy. The hind tibia is slightly dilated. Forewings with stalked veins 7, 8 and 9, from upper angle. Vein 10 absent.

== Species ==
- Stegania cararia (Hubner, 1790)
- Stegania dalmataria Guenée, 1857
- Stegania dilectaria (Hubner, 1790)
- Stegania frixa (Prout, 1937)
- Stegania mesonephele (Wiltshire, 1967)
- Stegania ochrearia Bang-Haas, 1910
- Stegania oranaria (Wehrli, 1930)
- Stegania postrecta (Wehrli, 1930)
- Stegania trimaculata (Villers, 1789)
- Stegania wiltshirei (Ebert, 1965)
