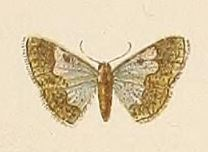

Scientific classification
- Domain: Eukaryota
- Kingdom: Animalia
- Phylum: Arthropoda
- Class: Insecta
- Order: Lepidoptera
- Family: Geometridae
- Genus: Zamarada
- Species: Z. aureomarginata

Binomial name
- Zamarada aureomarginata Pagenstecher, 1907

= Zamarada aureomarginata =

Species of moth

Zamarada aureomarginata is a moth of the family Geometridae first described by Arnold Pagenstecher in 1907. It is found in south west Madagascar.

It has a wingspan of 15 mm.
