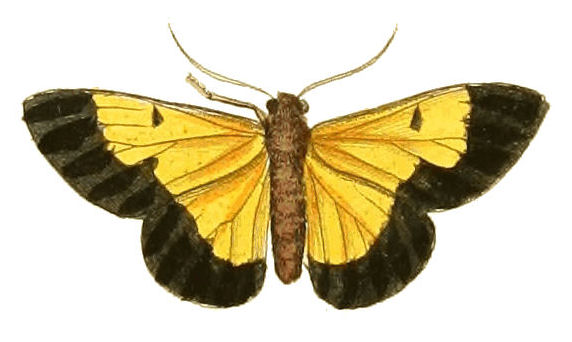
- Illustration by Dru Drury

Scientific classification
- Kingdom: Animalia
- Phylum: Arthropoda
- Clade: Pancrustacea
- Class: Insecta
- Order: Lepidoptera
- Family: Geometridae
- Genus: Zamarada
- Species: Z. eucharis

Binomial name
- Zamarada eucharis (Drury, 1782)

Synonyms
- Phalaena eucharis Drury, 1782

= Zamarada eucharis =

Species of moth

Zamarada eucharis is a species of moth in the family Geometridae. It was first described by Dru Drury in 1782, from Sierra Leone (not Brazil as mentioned in the original description). It is found in Ivory Coast, Ghana, Guinea, Liberia and Sierra Leone

== Description ==
Upperside: Antennae setaceous. Thorax and abdomen brown. Anterior wings greyish yellow, with a single spot placed near the middle, almost close to the anterior edge. Posterior wings of the same colour as the anterior, and like them surrounded with a deep black border.

Underside: Tongue spiral. Legs, breast, and abdomen grey. Wings coloured as on the upper side, the borders being fainter. Margins of the wings entire. Wing span 1 1/2 inches (38 mm).
