= Heterostegane rectifascia =

Scientific classification
- Kingdom: Animalia
- Phylum: Arthropoda
- Clade: Pancrustacea
- Class: Insecta
- Order: Lepidoptera
- Family: Geometridae
- Genus: Heterostegane
- Species: H. rectifascia

Binomial name
- Heterostegane rectifascia Hampson, 1892

Species of moth

Heterostegane rectifascia is a moth of the family Geometridae first described by George Hampson in 1892. It is found in Sri Lanka.
