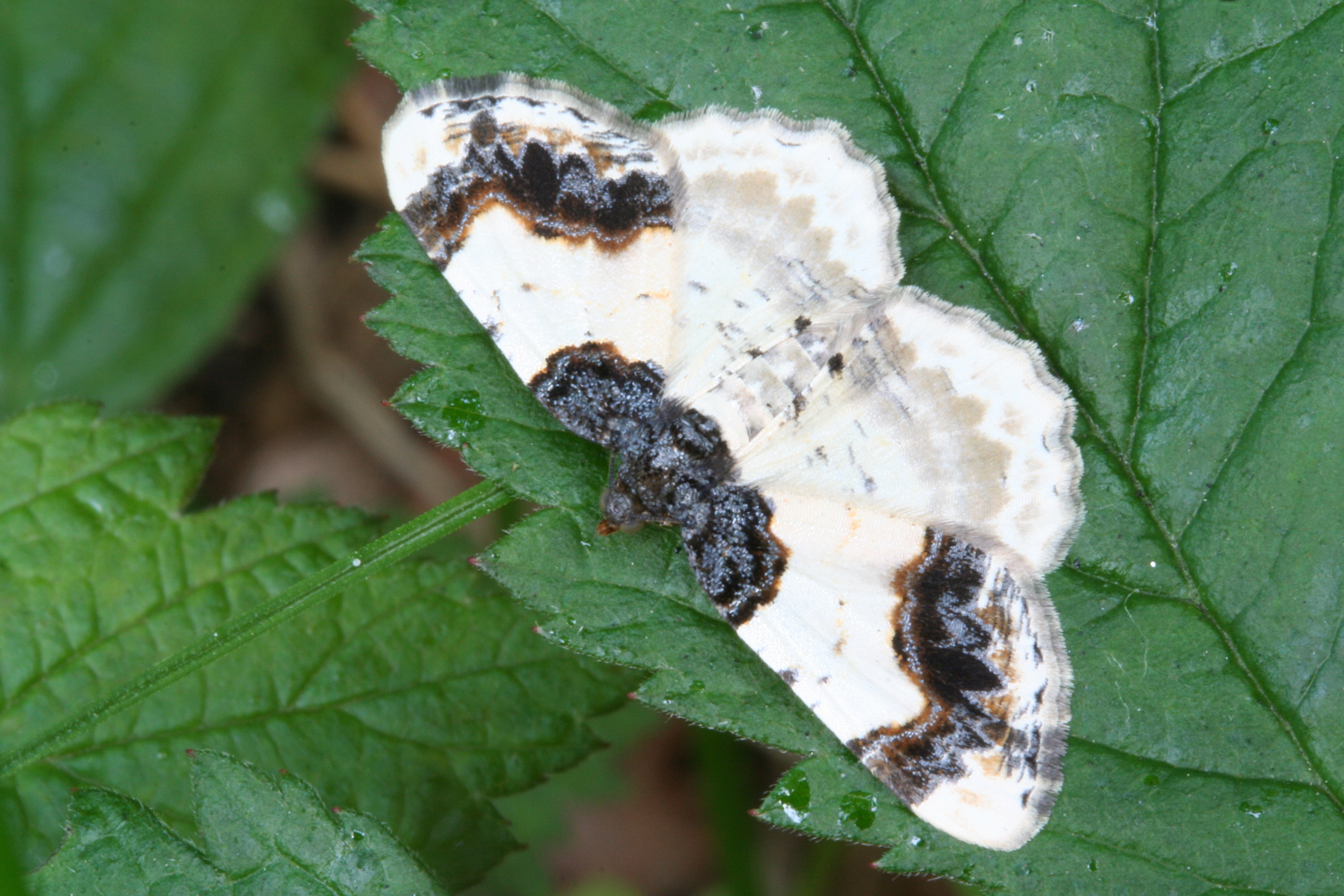
- Ligdia adustata

Scientific classification
- Kingdom: Animalia
- Phylum: Arthropoda
- Class: Insecta
- Order: Lepidoptera
- Family: Geometridae
- Tribe: Abraxini
- Genus: Ligdia; Guenée in Boisduval & Guenée, 1857

Synonyms
- Harpicostia Wehrli, 1936

= Ligdia =

Genus of moths

Ligdia is a genus of moths in the family Geometridae erected by Achille Guenée in 1857.

== Species ==
- Ligdia adustata (Denis & Schiffermüller, 1775)
- Ligdia coctata Guenée, [1858]
- Ligdia extratenebrosa (Wehrli, 1936)
- Ligdia wagneri Ferguson & Adams, 2008
