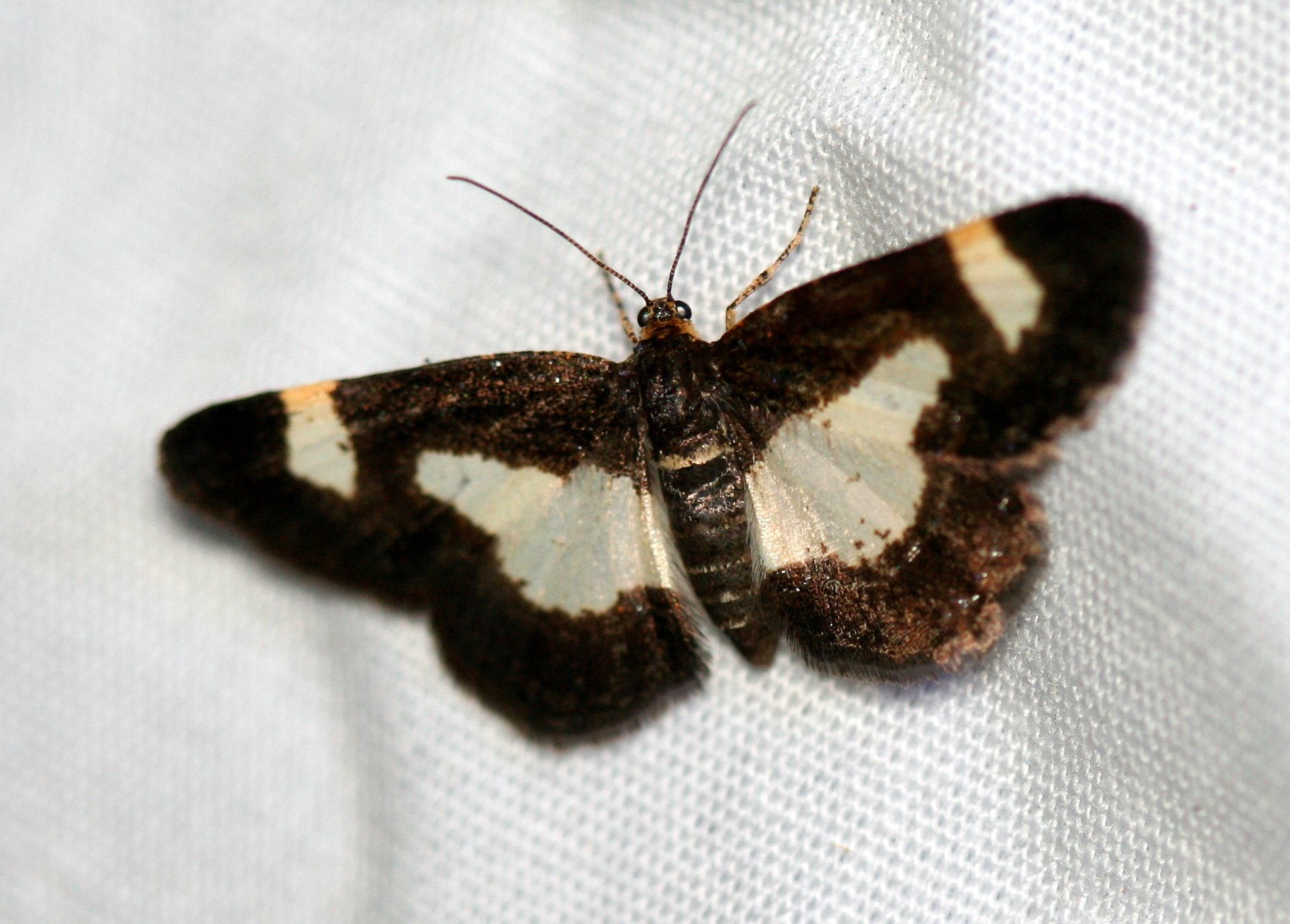

Scientific classification
- Kingdom: Animalia
- Phylum: Arthropoda
- Class: Insecta
- Order: Lepidoptera
- Family: Geometridae
- Genus: Heliomata
- Species: H. cycladata

Binomial name
- Heliomata cycladata Grote & Robinson, 1866

Synonyms
- Heliomata fulliola Barnes & McDunnough, 1917

= Heliomata cycladata =

Species of insect, common spring moth

Heliomata cycladata, the common spring moth, is a moth of the family Geometridae. The species was first described by Augustus Radcliffe Grote and Coleman Townsend Robinson in 1866. It is found in eastern North America, with records from southern Ontario, southern Quebec, Maine, New Hampshire, Michigan, Wisconsin to South Carolina, Georgia, Alabama, northern Mississippi and Arkansas.

The wingspan is about 20 mm. Adults are on wing from March to July.

The larvae feed on Robinia pseudoacacia and Gleditsia triacanthos.
