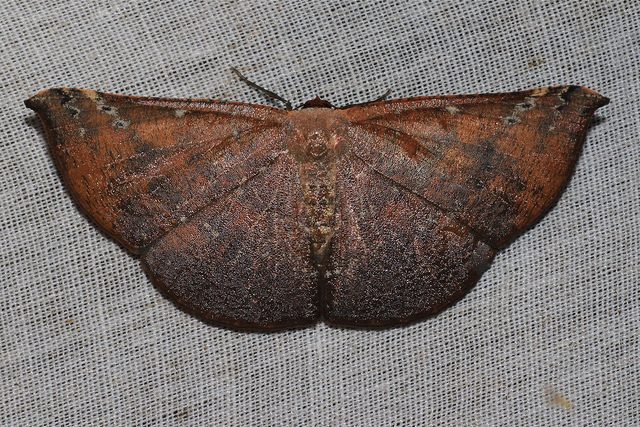
- Auzeodes chalybeata from Borneo

Scientific classification
- Kingdom: Animalia
- Phylum: Arthropoda
- Class: Insecta
- Order: Lepidoptera
- Family: Geometridae
- Tribe: Cassymini
- Genus: Auzeodes; Warren, 1893

= Auzeodes =

Genus of moths

Auzeodes is a genus of moths in the family Geometridae.

== Species ==
Listed from Catalogue of Life: 2011 Annual Checklist

- Auzeodes chalybeata Walker, 1866
- Auzeodes coctata Warren, 1897
- Auzeodes nigroseriata Warren, 1893
- Auzeodes perculta Prout
- Auzeodes rufa Warren, 1897
- Auzeodes uniformis Warren, 1901
