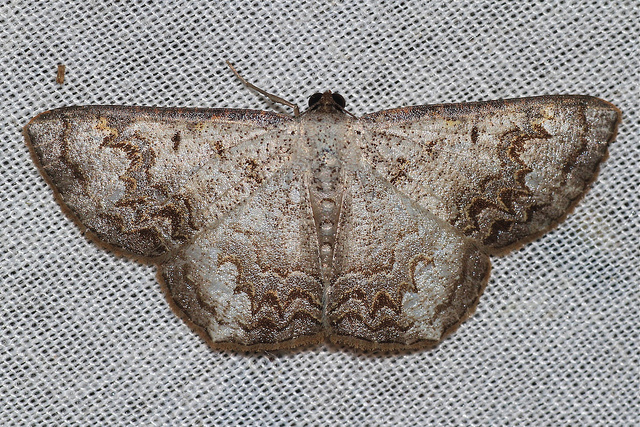
- Cassyma chrotadelpha from Borneo

Scientific classification
- Kingdom: Animalia
- Phylum: Arthropoda
- Class: Insecta
- Order: Lepidoptera
- Family: Geometridae
- Tribe: Cassymini
- Genus: Cassyma; Guenée in Boisduval & Guenée, 1857

Type species
- Cassyma sciticincta Walker, [1863]

Synonyms
- Ingena Walker, [1863]

= Cassyma =

Genus of moths

Cassyma is a genus of moths in the family Geometridae first described by Achille Guenée in 1857. Its species are found primarily in South and Southeast Asia.

== Species ==
- Cassyma amplexaria (Walker, 1862)
- Cassyma chrotadelpha Sommerer & Stuning, 1992
- Cassyma chrotodon (Prout, 1925)
- Cassyma deletaria (Moore, 1888)
- Cassyma electrodes Sommerer & Stuning, 1992
- Cassyma erythrodon Sommerer & Stuning, 1992
- Cassyma indistincta (Moore, 1887)
- Cassyma lucifera (Warren, 1903)
- Cassyma pallidula Warren, 1896
- Cassyma quadrinata Guenée, 1857
- Cassyma sciticincta (Walker, 1863)
- Cassyma undifasciata (Butler, 1892)
