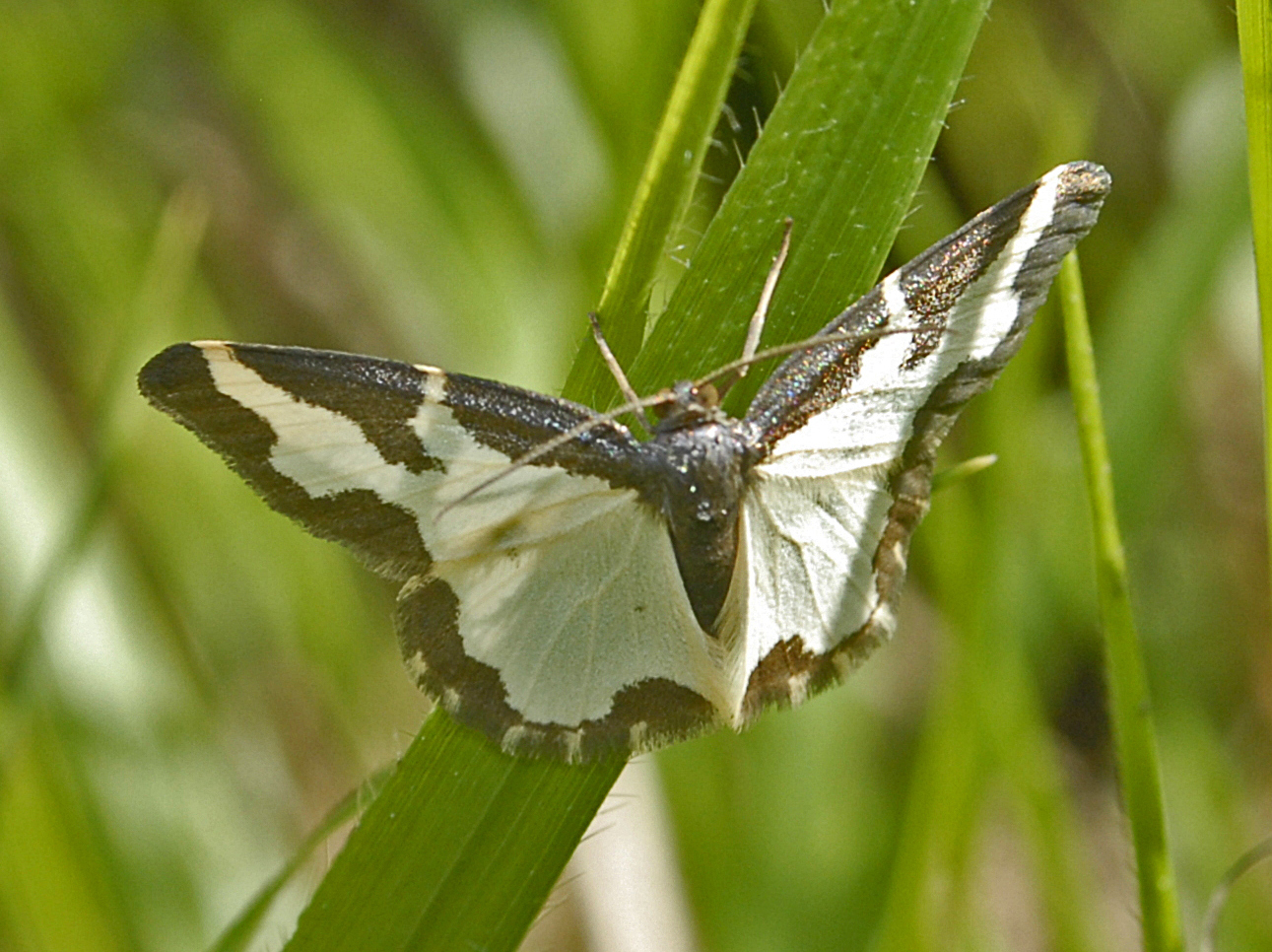
- Lomaspilis marginata

Scientific classification
- Domain: Eukaryota
- Kingdom: Animalia
- Phylum: Arthropoda
- Class: Insecta
- Order: Lepidoptera
- Family: Geometridae
- Tribe: Abraxini
- Genus: Lomaspilis; Hübner, 1825

= Lomaspilis =

Genus of moths

Lomaspilis is a genus of moths in the family Geometridae erected by Jacob Hübner in 1825.

== Description ==
Lomaspilis species have a wingspan reaching 24–28 millimetres (0.94–1.10 in). Males have simple or fasciculate-ciliate antennae. Forewings have convexly curved outer margins. They are usually white or ochreous white, with dark bands and blotches. Hindwings usually are showily patterned. The basic color is white or ochreous white, with a dark fuscous marginal band. In the early stages larvae feed on willows (Salix species).

== Species ==
- Lomaspilis albociliata
- Lomaspilis albomarginata
- Lomaspilis amurensis
- Lomaspilis andrearia
- Lomaspilis artoni
- Lomaspilis bithynica
- Lomaspilis brunnescens
- Lomaspilis conflua
- Lomaspilis demarginata
- Lomaspilis diluta
- Lomaspilis discocellularis
- Lomaspilis dumeei
- Lomaspilis hjordisi
- Lomaspilis hortulata
- Lomaspilis huenei
- Lomaspilis kumakurai
- Lomaspilis lacticolor
- Lomaspilis limbata
- Lomaspilis maculata
- Lomaspilis marginaria
- Lomaspilis marginata
- Lomaspilis mediofasciata
- Lomaspilis naevaria
- Lomaspilis nigrita
- Lomaspilis nigrofasciata
- Lomaspilis nigrosparsata
- Lomaspilis nigrounicolorata
- Lomaspilis opis
- Lomaspilis pollutaria
- Lomaspilis postalbata
- Lomaspilis semialbata
- Lomaspilis staphyleata
- Lomaspilis subdeleta
- Lomaspilis suffusa
- Lomaspilis wendlandtiata
