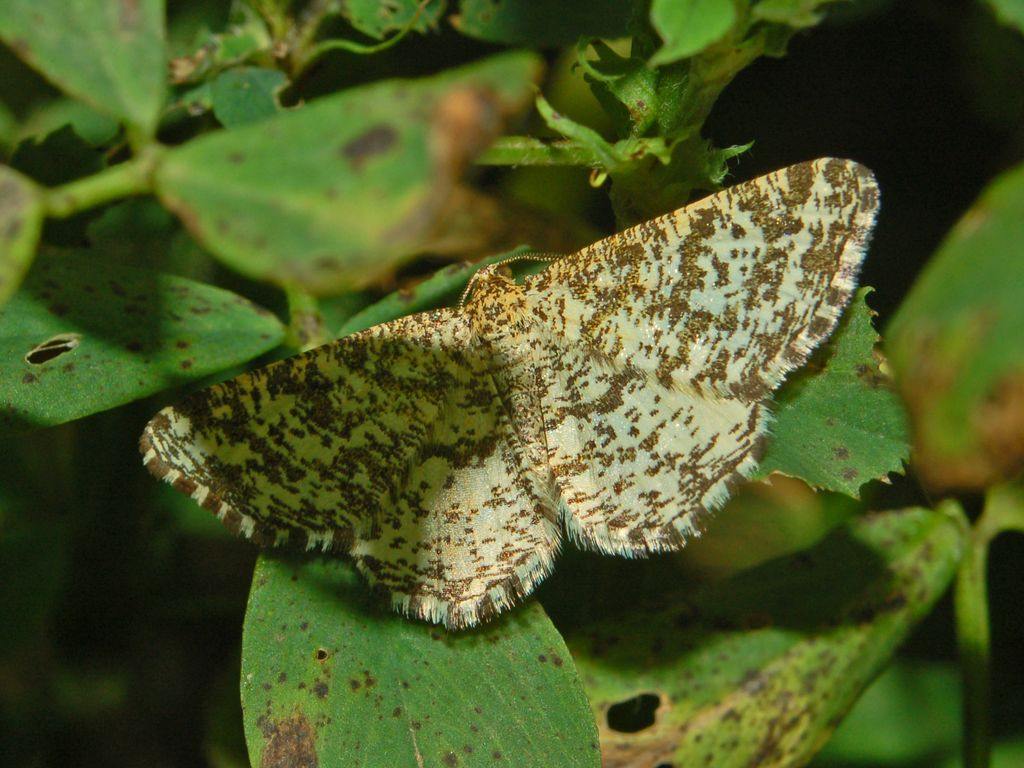

Scientific classification
- Domain: Eukaryota
- Kingdom: Animalia
- Phylum: Arthropoda
- Class: Insecta
- Order: Lepidoptera
- Family: Geometridae
- Genus: Heliomata
- Species: H. glarearia

Binomial name
- Heliomata glarearia (Denis & Schiffermüller, 1775)

Synonyms
- Geometra glarearia Denis & Schiffermüller, 1775; Semiothisa glarearia Denis & Schiffermüller, 1775

= Heliomata glarearia =

Species of moth

Heliomata glarearia is a moth of the family Geometridae and subfamily Ennominae. The species was first described by Michael Denis and Ignaz Schiffermüller in 1775.

It is found throughout the central and southern Europe and the Near East.

The wingspan is about 20–24 mm. Adults are on wing from May until August.

The larvae mainly feed on Medicago falcata.
