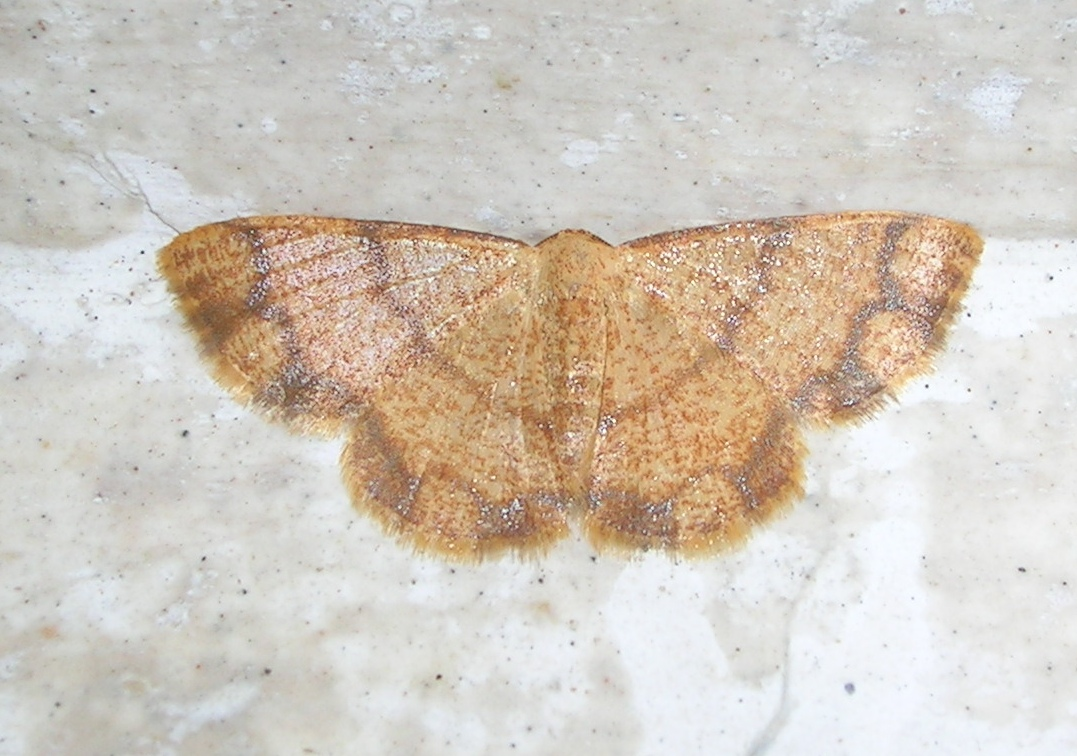
- Heterostegane species in India's Western Ghats

Scientific classification
- Kingdom: Animalia
- Phylum: Arthropoda
- Class: Insecta
- Order: Lepidoptera
- Family: Geometridae
- Tribe: Abraxini
- Genus: Heterostegane; Hampson, 1893

Synonyms
- Chrostobapta Warren, 1907; Deuterostegane Wehrli, 1939; Liposchema Warren, 1914

= Heterostegane =

Genus of moths

Heterostegane is a genus of moths in the family Geometridae described by George Hampson in 1893.

== Species ==
- Heterostegane amputata Herbulot, 1993
- Heterostegane auranticollis Prout, 1922
- Heterostegane aurantiaca Warren, 1894
- Heterostegane bifasciata (Warren, 1914)
- Heterostegane boghensis Wiltshire, 1985
- Heterostegane circumrubrata Prout, 1915
- Heterostegane constessellata (Prout, 1926)
- Heterostegane elephantina Herbulot, 1992
- Heterostegane felix (Herbulot, 1974)
- Heterostegane flavata (Warren, 1905)
- Heterostegane hyriaria Warren, 1894
- Heterostegane incognita Prout, 1915
- Heterostegane infusca (Herbulot, 1973)
- Heterostegane insulata Warren, 1898
- Heterostegane leroyi (D. S. Fletcher, 1958)
- Heterostegane luteorubens (Mabille, 1900)
- Heterostegane maxima (Herbulot, 1957)
- Heterostegane mediosecta Herbulot, 1993
- Heterostegane minax Prout 1931
- Heterostegane minuscula Herbulot, 1995
- Heterostegane minutissima (Swinhoe, 1904)
- Heterostegane monilifera Prout, 1915
- Heterostegane nyassa Herbulot, 1993
- Heterostegane pachyspila (D. S. Fletcher, 1958)
- Heterostegane pleninotata (Warren, 1901)
- Heterostegane rectifascia Hampson
- Heterostegane robinsoni (Herbulot, 1957)
- Heterostegane ruberata (Mabille, 1900)
- Heterostegane serrata (D. S. Fletcher, 1958)
- Heterostegane subfasciata Warren, 1899
- Heterostegane subtessellata (Walker, [1863])
- Heterostegane thieli Herbulot, 1995
- Heterostegane tritocampsis (Prout, 1934)
- Heterostegane urbica (Swinhoe, 1895)
- Heterostegane vetula Prout, 1916
- Heterostegane warreni (Prout, 1932)
