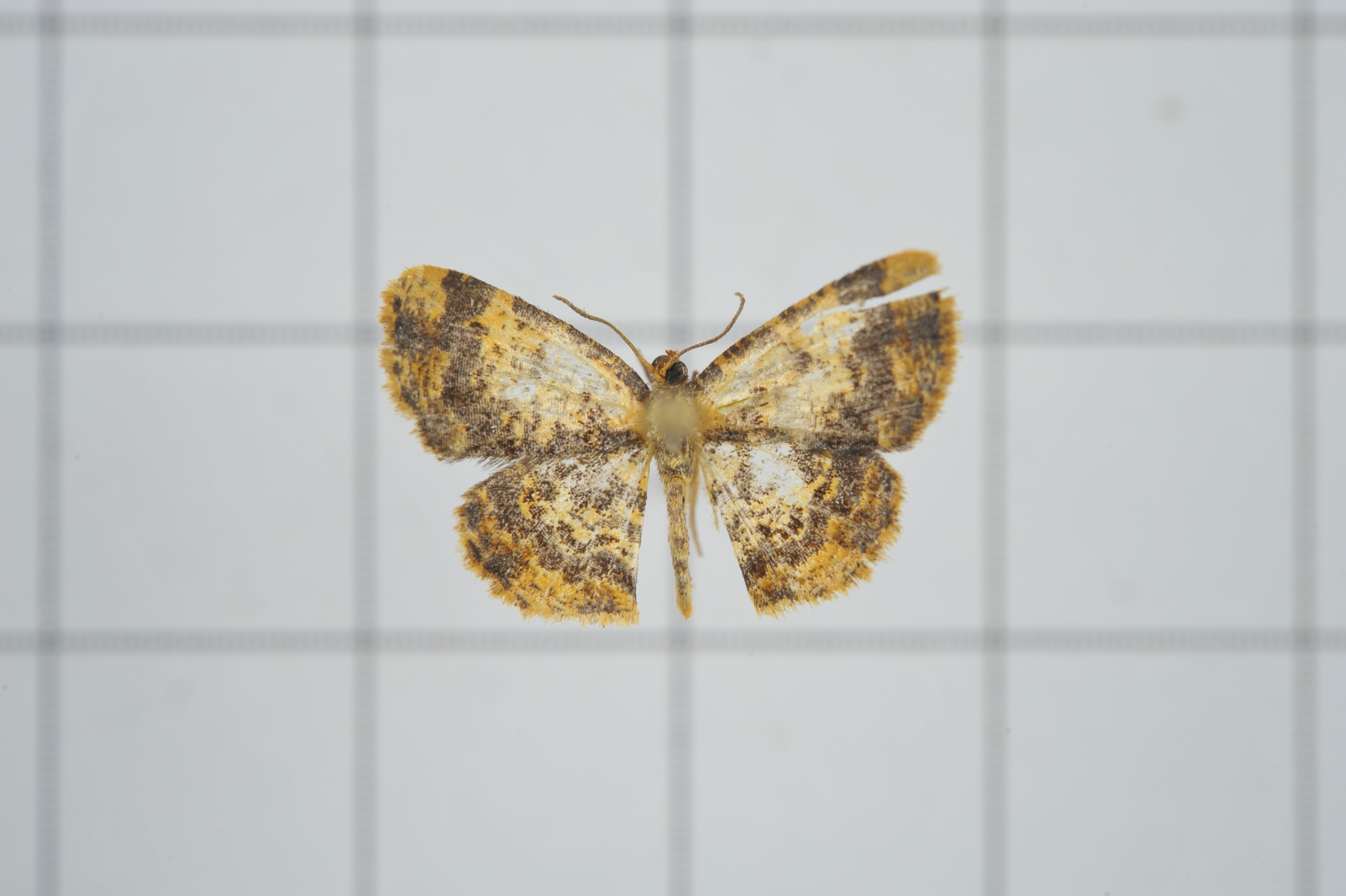

Scientific classification
- Kingdom: Animalia
- Phylum: Arthropoda
- Class: Insecta
- Order: Lepidoptera
- Family: Geometridae
- Genus: Ninodes
- Species: N. splendens

Binomial name
- Ninodes splendens (Butler, 1878)

Synonyms
- Ephyra splendens Butler, 1878

= Ninodes splendens =

Species of moth

Ninodes splendens is a moth in the family Geometridae described by Arthur Gardiner Butler in 1878. It is found in Japan.
