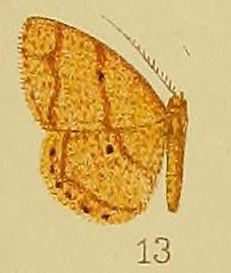
- Xenostega fallax

Scientific classification
- Kingdom: Animalia
- Phylum: Arthropoda
- Class: Insecta
- Order: Lepidoptera
- Family: Geometridae
- Tribe: Abraxini
- Genus: Xenostega; Warren, 1899

Type species
- Xenostega fallax Warren, 1899

= Xenostega =

Genus of moths

Xenostega is a genus of moths in the family Geometridae described by Warren in 1899.

== Species ==
- Xenostega fallax Warren, 1899
- Xenostega irrorata Prout, 1915
- Xenostega diagramma (Hampson, 1910)
- Xenostega tincta Warren, 1899
- Xenostega tyana C. Swinhoe, 1904
