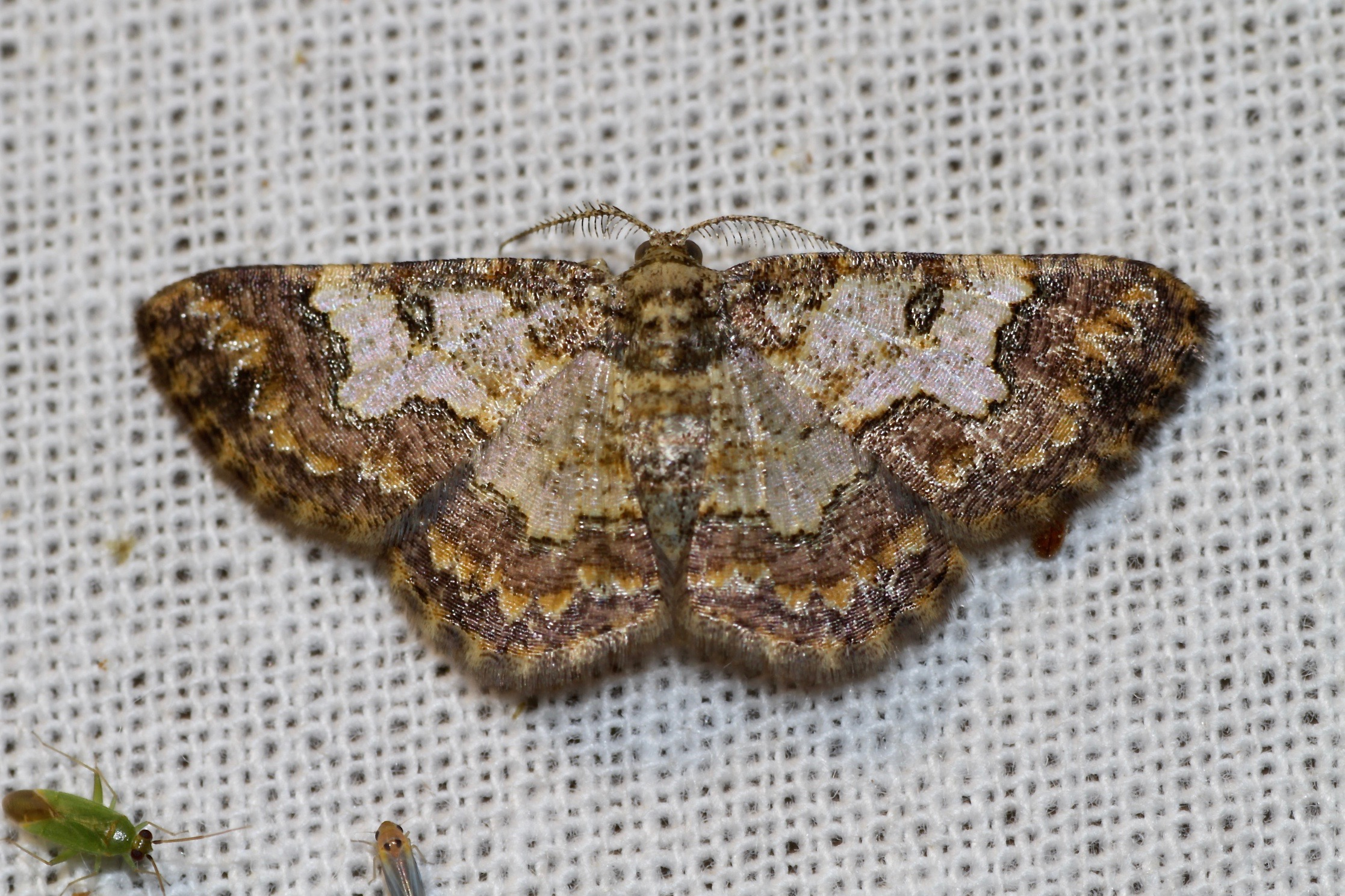

Scientific classification
- Kingdom: Animalia
- Phylum: Arthropoda
- Clade: Pancrustacea
- Class: Insecta
- Order: Lepidoptera
- Family: Geometridae
- Genus: Zamarada
- Species: Z. metallicata

Binomial name
- Zamarada metallicata Warren, 1914

= Zamarada metallicata =

Species of moth

Zamarada metallicata is a moth of the family Geometridae first described by William Warren in 1914.

== Distribution ==
It is known from Botswana, Namibia, South Africa and Zimbabwe.

== Biology ==
A known food plant of the larvae is Acacia karroo (Fabaceae).
