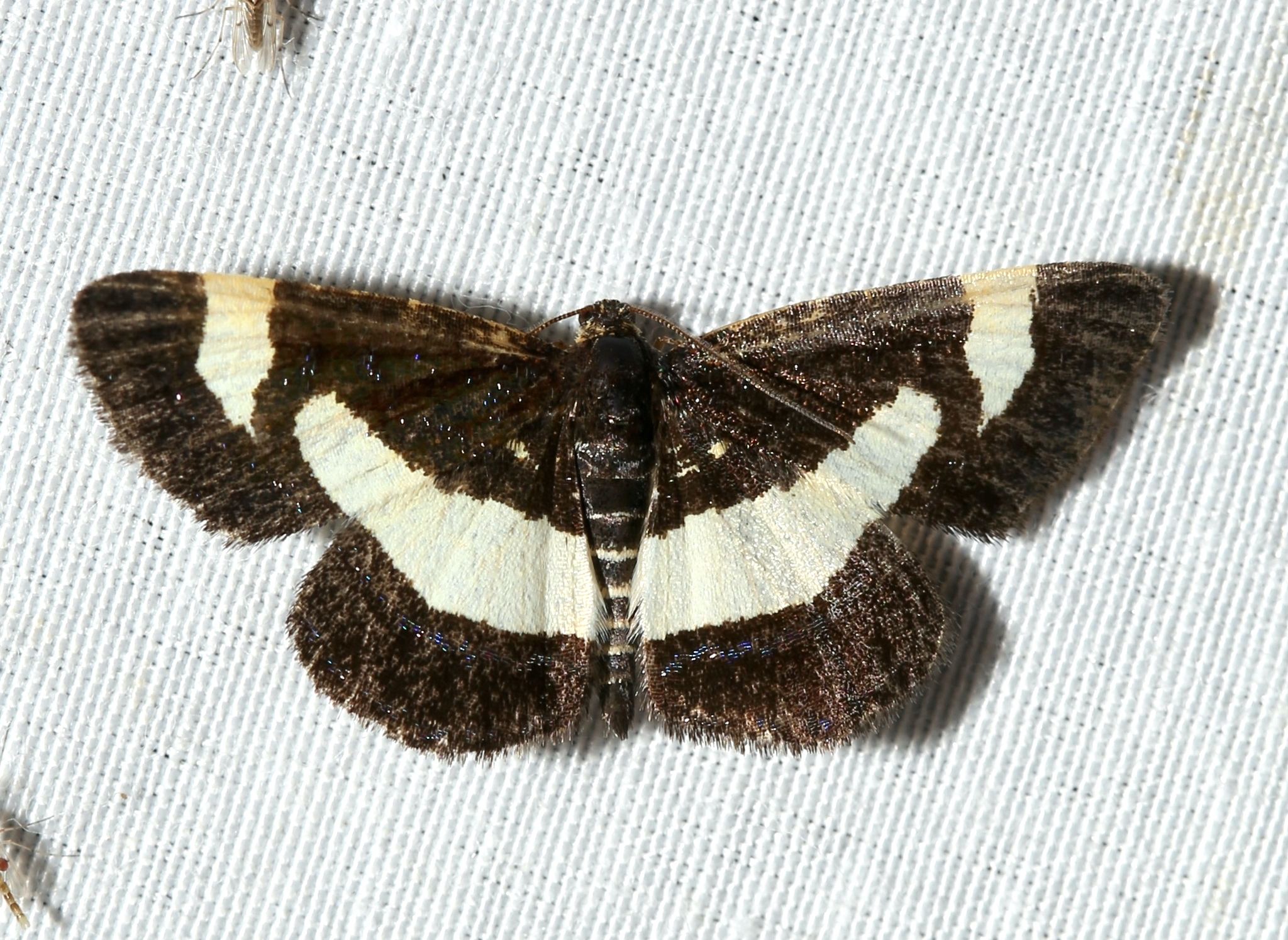

Scientific classification
- Kingdom: Animalia
- Phylum: Arthropoda
- Class: Insecta
- Order: Lepidoptera
- Family: Geometridae
- Genus: Heliomata
- Species: H. infulata

Binomial name
- Heliomata infulata (Grote, 1863)

Synonyms
- Baptria infulata Grote, 1863

= Heliomata infulata =

Species of moth

Heliomata infulata, the rare spring moth, is a species of geometrid moth in the family Geometridae. It is found in North America.

The MONA or Hodges number for Heliomata infulata is 6263.
