= Protitame =

Scientific classification
- Kingdom: Animalia
- Phylum: Arthropoda
- Class: Insecta
- Order: Lepidoptera
- Family: Geometridae
- Tribe: Cassymini
- Genus: Protitame; McDunnough, 1939

Synonyms
- Sperrya Rindge, 1958

Genus of moths

Protitame is a genus of moths in the family Geometridae erected by James Halliday McDunnough in 1939.

== Species ==
The following species are classified in the genus. This list is likely incomplete.

- Protitame virginalis (Hulst, 1900) – virgin moth
- Protitame subalbaria (Packard, 1873)
- Protitame cervula (Rindge, 1958)
