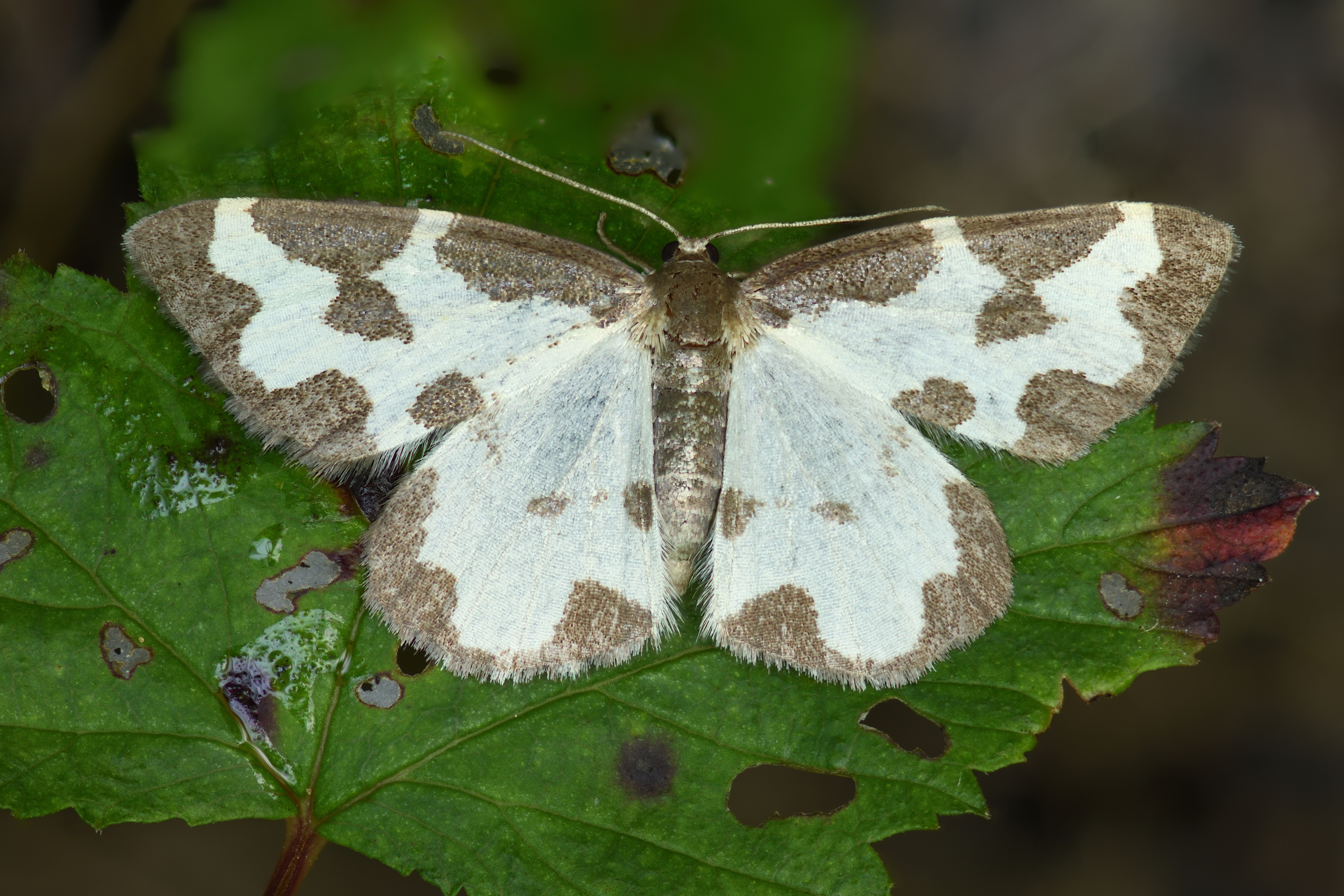
- Dorsal view
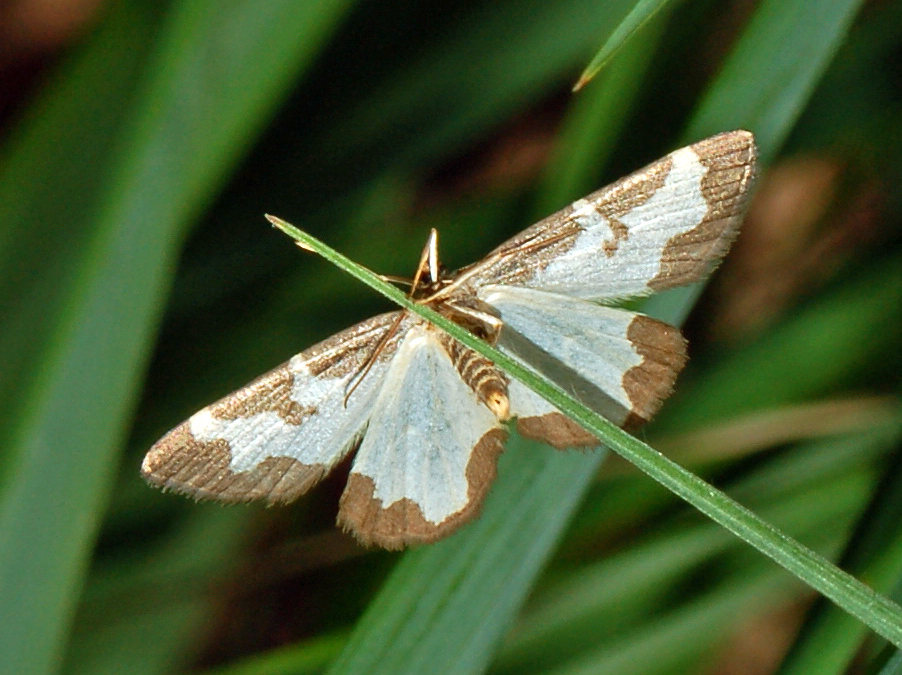
- Ventral view

Scientific classification
- Kingdom: Animalia
- Phylum: Arthropoda
- Clade: Pancrustacea
- Class: Insecta
- Order: Lepidoptera
- Family: Geometridae
- Genus: Lomaspilis
- Species: L. marginata

Binomial name
- Lomaspilis marginata (Linnaeus, 1758)

Synonyms
- Abraxas marginata Alphéraky, 1897; Lomaspilis marginata amurensis Beljaev & Vasilenko, 2002; Phalaena marginata Linnaeus, 1758

= Clouded border =

Species of moth

The clouded border (Lomaspilis marginata) is a moth of the family Geometridae. The species was first described by Carl Linnaeus in his 1758 10th edition of Systema Naturae. It is distributed across most of Europe to the Urals, western and central Siberia, Transbaikalia, Kazakhstan, Tian-Shan, northern Mongolia and parts of the Near East.

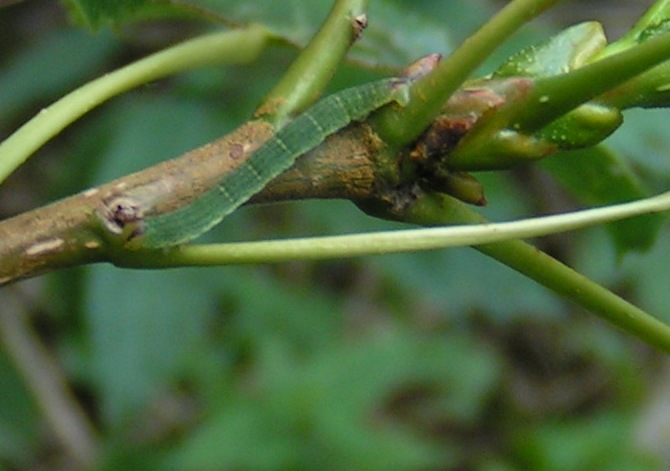
Larva

== Description ==
This is a very distinctive species with white wings marked with black blotches around the margins. The amount of black varies, with the males usually (though not always) having more extensive black areas than the females. Occasionally almost entirely white or black individuals are seen, although this is rare. The wingspan is 24–28 mm. Lomaspilis marginata is extremely variable. Linnaeus's form has complete black border to both wings, also on the forewing additional spots or patches at base and middle of costa.

Aberrations:

- ab. nigrofasciata Schoyen: the median band, at least on the forewing, is complete, the marginal area is normal.
- ab. mediofasciata Hofner: has a complete median band but no marginal band.
- ab. dumeei de Joannis: lacks also the basal costal patch.
- ab. suffusa [Prout]: has the ground colour suffused with smoky yellow grey, the dark markings weak and blurred.
- ab. nigrounicolorata Haverkampf: is black throughout.
- ab. pollutaria Hbn.: has a narrow band of the ground colour at the distal margin, reducing and dividing into 2 parts the black marginal band.
- ab. subdeleta Ckll: forewmg with marginal band almost or altogether obsolete, narrow patches at base and middle of costa remaining, hindwing unmarked.
- ab. conflua Strand.: Costal patches confluent, also confluent with the marginal band. Median area normal.
- ab: opis Btlr: has on each wing three large median spots, longer than broad. It forms opis a local race in S. E. Siberia and Japan."

It flies at night in June and July and is attracted to light.

The egg is yellow green, with hexagonal reticulation. The larva, pale green with darker dorsal lines and a purplish anal spot, usually feeds on aspen and sallow but has also been recorded on birch, hazel and poplar. The species overwinters as a pupa, sometimes remaining in this form for up to four years.

== Subspecies ==
- Lomaspilis marginata amurensis (Hedemann, 1881)
- Lomaspilis marginata marginata (Linnaeus, 1758)
1. The flight season refers to the British Isles. This may vary in other parts of the range.
