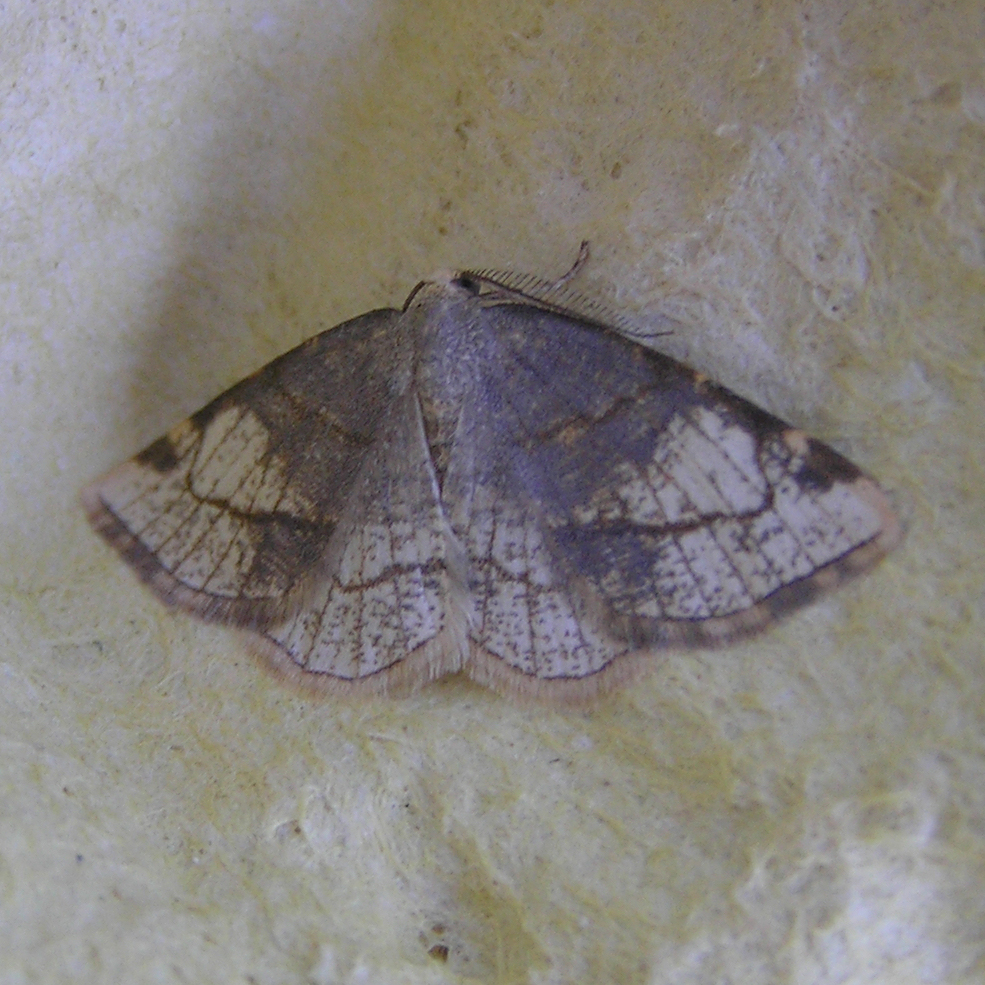

Scientific classification
- Domain: Eukaryota
- Kingdom: Animalia
- Phylum: Arthropoda
- Class: Insecta
- Order: Lepidoptera
- Family: Geometridae
- Genus: Stegania
- Species: S. trimaculata

Binomial name
- Stegania trimaculata (Villers, 1789)

= Stegania trimaculata =

Species of moth

Stegania trimaculata, the Dorset cream wave, is a moth of the family Geometridae. It is found throughout Europe and India, mainly in Southern Europe, also in Borneo.

The wingspan is 26–28 mm. The length of the forewings is 10–13 mm. The moth flies in two generations from May to September.

The larvae feed on various species of poplar.

== Notes ==
1. The flight season refers to Belgium and The Netherlands. This may vary in other parts of the range.
