= Hydatocapnia =

Scientific classification
- Domain: Eukaryota
- Kingdom: Animalia
- Phylum: Arthropoda
- Class: Insecta
- Order: Lepidoptera
- Family: Geometridae
- Genus: Hydatocapnia; Warren, 1895
- Species: H. marginata

Binomial name
- Hydatocapnia marginata (Warren, 1893)

Synonyms
- Zamarada marginata Warren, 1893

Genus of moths

Hydatocapnia is a monotypic moth genus in the family Geometridae. Its only species, Hydatocapnia marginata, is found in the Naga Hills of India and Myanmar. Both the genus and species were first described by William Warren, the genus in 1895 and the species in 1893.
