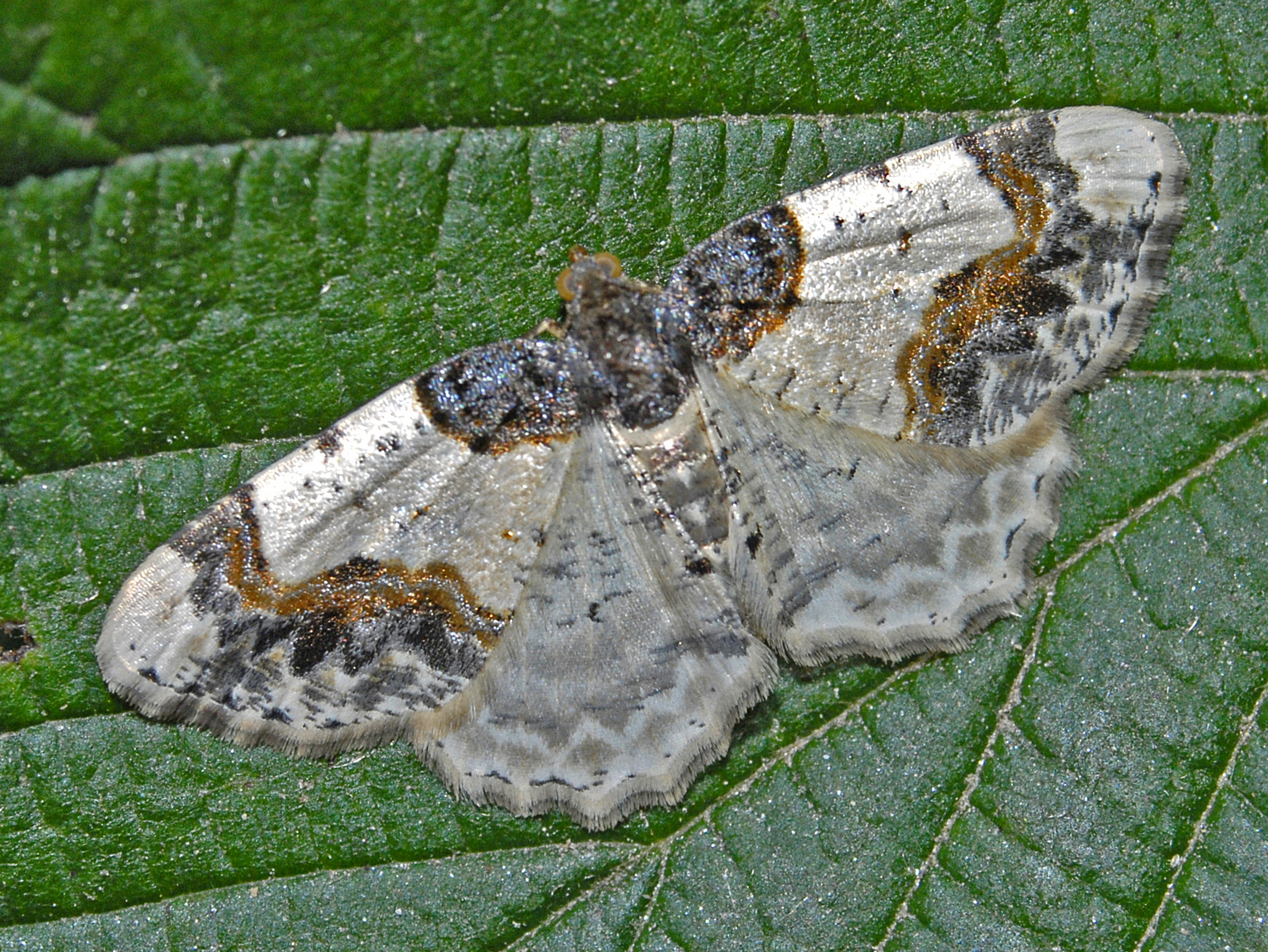
- Adult of Ligdia adustata

Scientific classification
- Domain: Eukaryota
- Kingdom: Animalia
- Phylum: Arthropoda
- Class: Insecta
- Order: Lepidoptera
- Family: Geometridae
- Genus: Ligdia
- Species: L. adustata

Binomial name
- Ligdia adustata (Denis & Schiffermüller, 1775)

Synonyms
- Geometra adustata Denis & Schiffermüller, 1775

= Ligdia adustata =

Species of moth

Ligdia adustata, the scorched carpet, is a moth of the family Geometridae.

== Etymology ==
The species Latin name adusta, meaning 'burnt', refers to the scorched appearance of the wings of these moths.

== Description ==
The wingspan is 25–30 mm. The basic color of the wings is glossy white, creamy white or light brownish. The basal area of the forewings is dark brown and can sometimes be slightly blue-grey. Across the forewings near the outer margin there is a blue-grey and brown wavy band. Hindwings are whitish with wavy pale brown lines on the slightly wavy outer edges. The underside of the wings is suffused with reddish brown.

Larvae are moderately stout, bright green with red dorsal spots, a red lateral blotch on the 1st—2nd abdominals and red marks on claspers; a rare variety is grey-brown. The pupae are red-brown with blackish wings.

Ligdia adustata has two generations per year (bivoltine species). The adults fly in April–May, and later in July–August, but the flight season varies greatly, depending on the location within the distribution range. These moths are active from dusk onwards.

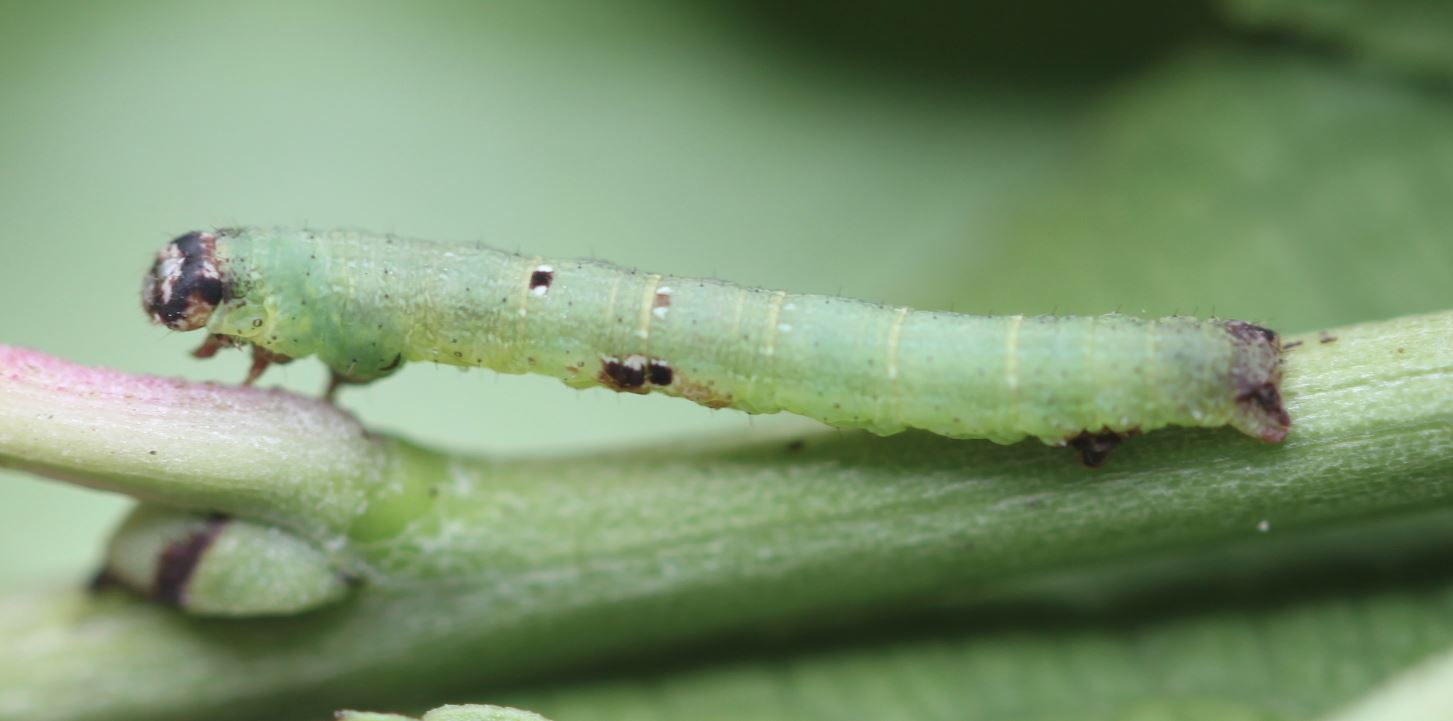
larva

The larvae feed on spindle (Euonymus europaeus, Euonymus verrucosa) and on Berberis species. The species overwinters as a pupa.

== Distribution ==
This species can be found in most of Europe and in the Near East.

== Habitat ==
This moth is common in various environments, mainly in shrubs, deciduous forests, thickets, parks and gardens.
