= Zamarada exigua =

Scientific classification
- Kingdom: Animalia
- Phylum: Arthropoda
- Class: Insecta
- Order: Lepidoptera
- Family: Geometridae
- Genus: Zamarada
- Species: Z. exigua

Binomial name
- Zamarada exigua D. S. Fletcher, 1974

Species of moth

Zamarada exigua is a geometer moth species first described by David Stephen Fletcher in 1974. Its name has only been provisionally accepted. It is found in both the Congo and Uganda.
