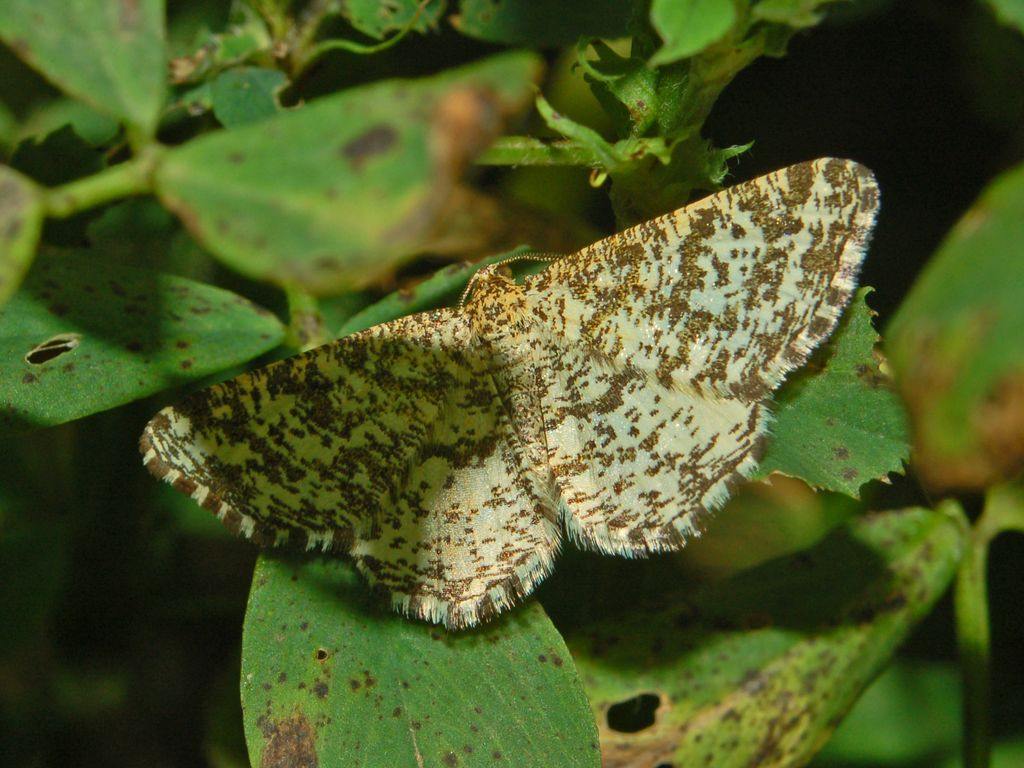
- Heliomata glarearia

Scientific classification
- Kingdom: Animalia
- Phylum: Arthropoda
- Class: Insecta
- Order: Lepidoptera
- Family: Geometridae
- Tribe: Macariini
- Genus: Heliomata; Grote & Robinson, 1866

Synonyms
- Pepasmenoptera Gumppenberg, 1887

= Heliomata =

Genus of moths

Heliomata is a genus of moths in the family Geometridae.

== Species ==
- Heliomata cycladata Grote & Robinson, 1866 – common spring moth
- Heliomata fulliola Barnes & McDunnough, 1917
- Heliomata glarearia (Denis & Schiffermuller, 1775)
- Heliomata infulata (Grote, 1863) – rare spring moth
