= Pristostegania =

Scientific classification
- Kingdom: Animalia
- Phylum: Arthropoda
- Clade: Pancrustacea
- Class: Insecta
- Order: Lepidoptera
- Family: Geometridae
- Genus: Pristostegania; Warren, 1897
- Species: P. trilineata

Binomial name
- Pristostegania trilineata (Moore, [1868])

Synonyms
- Hyria trilineata Moore, [1868]

Genus of moths

Pristostegania is a monotypic moth genus in the family Geometridae described by Warren in 1897. Its single species, Pristostegania trilineata, described by Frederic Moore in 1868, is found in Darjeeling, India.
