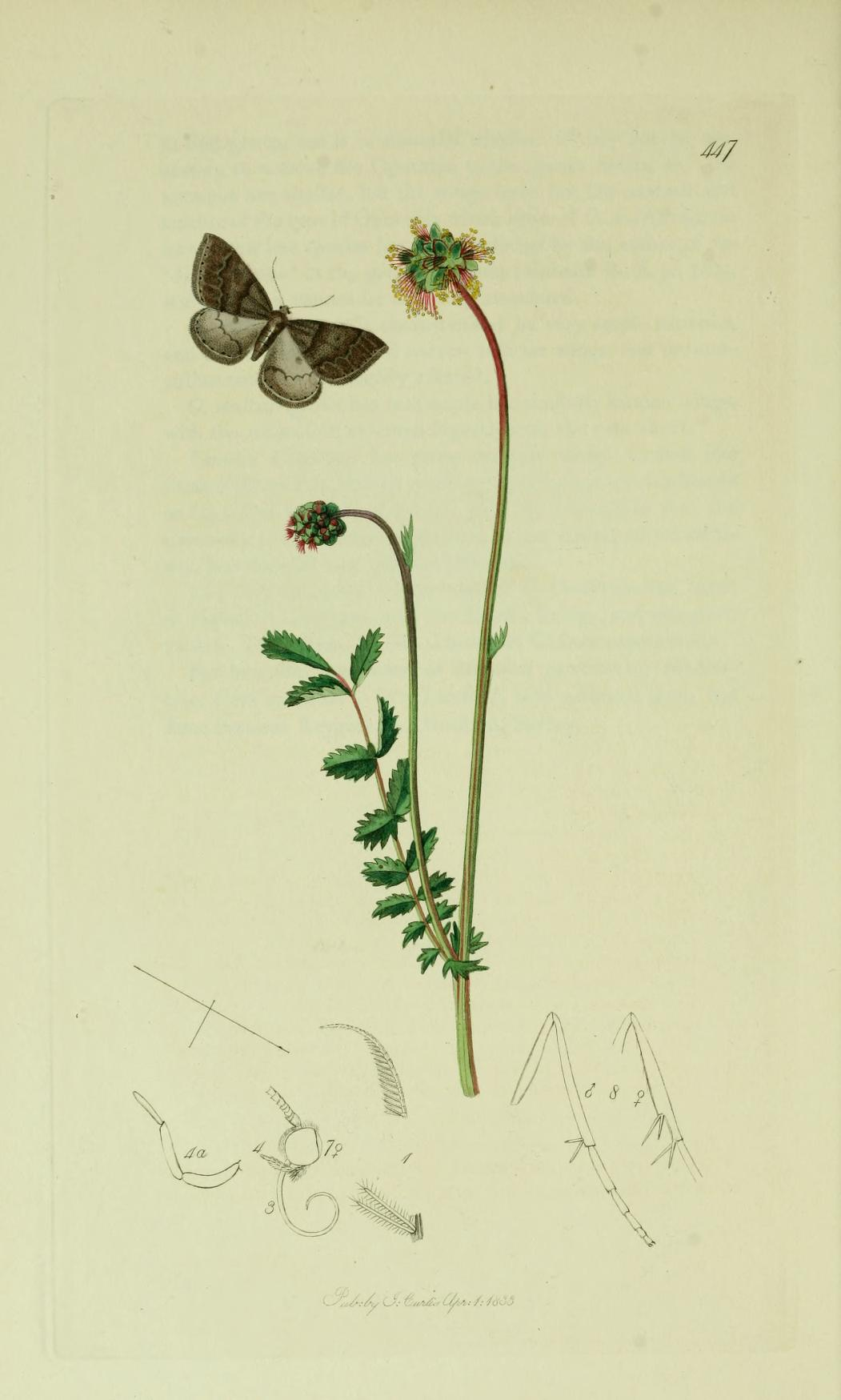
- Illustration from John Curtis's British Entomology Volume 6

Scientific classification
- Domain: Eukaryota
- Kingdom: Animalia
- Phylum: Arthropoda
- Class: Insecta
- Order: Lepidoptera
- Family: Geometridae
- Genus: Aleucis
- Species: A. distinctata

Binomial name
- Aleucis distinctata (Herrich-Schäffer, [1839])

Synonyms
- Lomographa distinctata (Herrich-Schäffer, [1839]); Erannis distinctata Herrich-Schäffer, [1839]; Aleucis pictaria (Curtis, 1833) misidentified and misapplied

= Aleucis distinctata =

Species of moth

Aleucis distinctata, the sloe carpet or Kent mocha, is a moth of the family Geometridae. The species was first described by Gottlieb August Wilhelm Herrich-Schäffer in 1839. It is found from Europe to Turkey, Azerbaijan and Turkmenistan.

The wingspan is 27–31 mm. The head is fuscous. The forewings are fuscous, sprinkled with darker. The first line is hardly curved, the second is subsinuate, waved and dark fuscous. There is a dark fuscous discal spot. The hindwings are whitish-fuscous, the dorsum sprinkled with darker with a discal dot and a waved second line. The larva is brown-grey segments 5–8 with a dark V-shaped dorsal mark; segments 1,2 with a black transverse line; segments 8, 9 with whitish lateral patches; segments 3, 4 with a short oblique black lateral streak; segments 6–9 with black lateral spots. Very like Theria rupicapraria but smaller, with simple antenna, abdomen with white dorsal dots. Local in Central Europe ab. contrastaria Fuchs has the median area darkened. orientalis Stgr.[now full species], the usual eastern form, is paler, more greyish. Asia Minor, Palestine and Mardin.

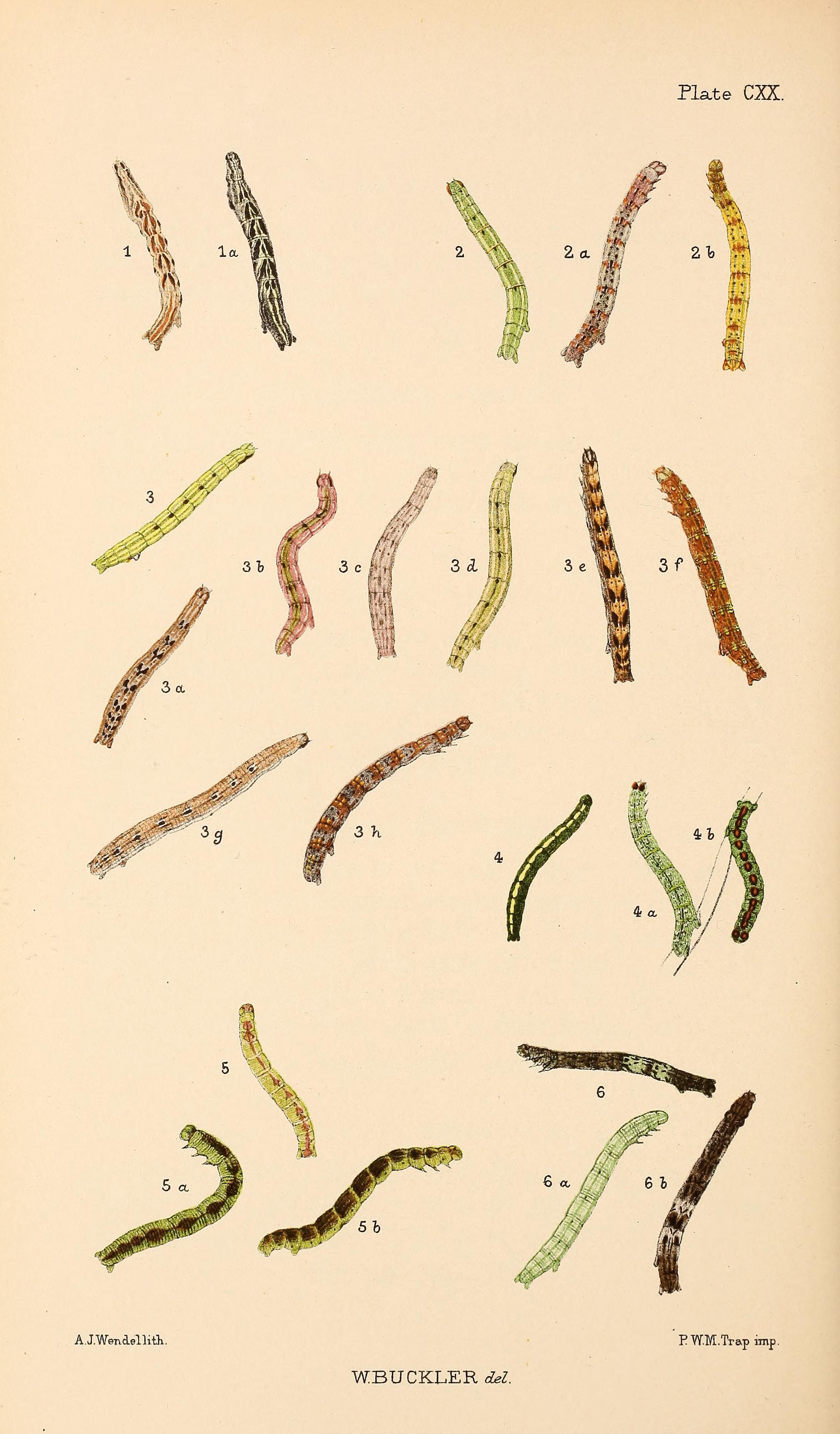
6,6a,6b larvae in various stages

The larvae feed on Prunus spinosa.
