= Aleucis =

Scientific classification
- Kingdom: Animalia
- Phylum: Arthropoda
- Clade: Pancrustacea
- Class: Insecta
- Order: Lepidoptera
- Family: Geometridae
- Tribe: Baptini
- Genus: Aleucis; Guenée, 1844

Genus of geometer moths

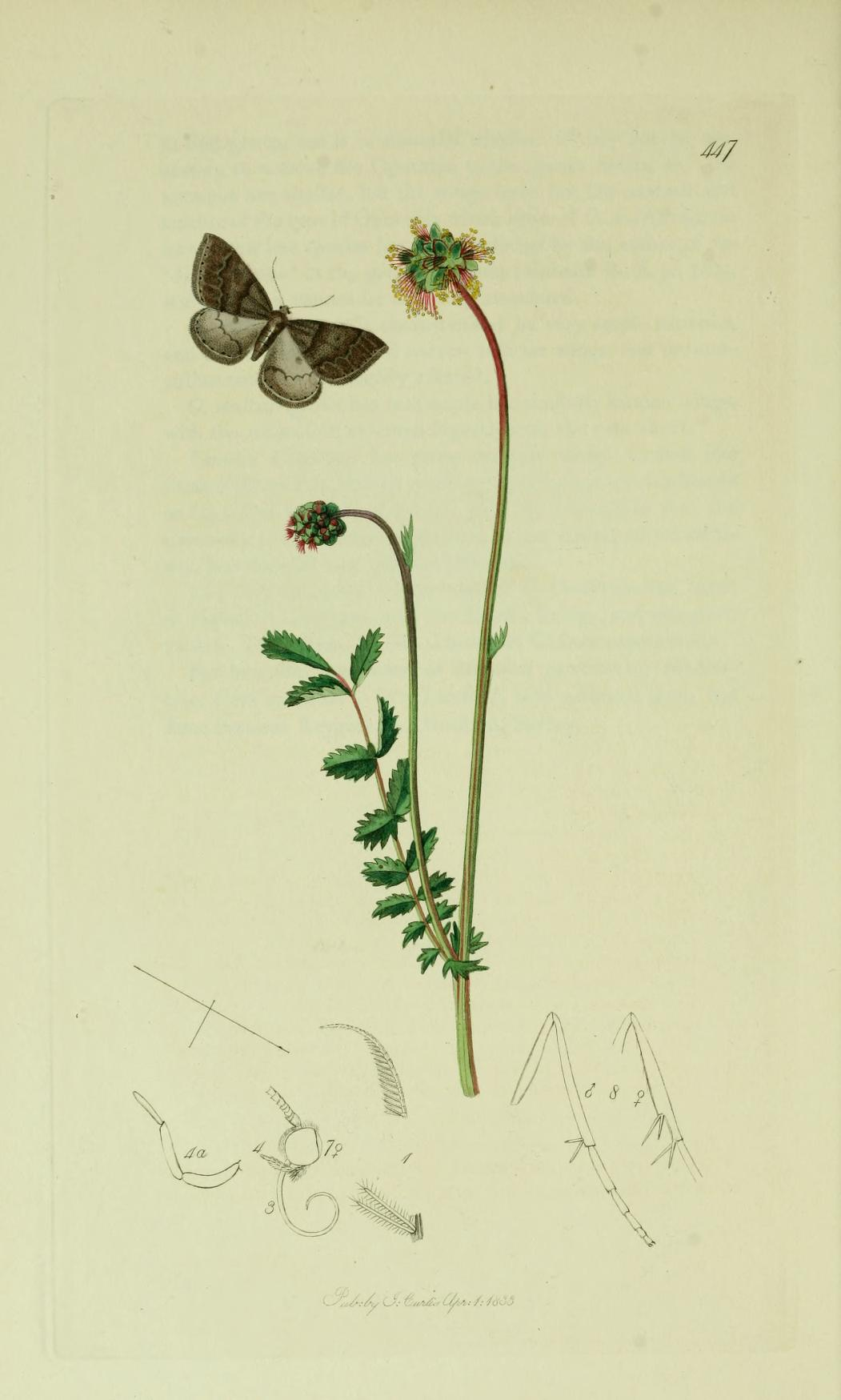
An illustration of the Aleucis distinctata.

Aleucis is a monotypic genus of moths in the family Geometridae. It contains only a single species, Aleucis distinctata (Herrich-Schäffer, [1839]), the sloe carpet.

== Former species ==
- Aleucis orientalis (Staudinger, 1892), now Lomographa orientalis.
