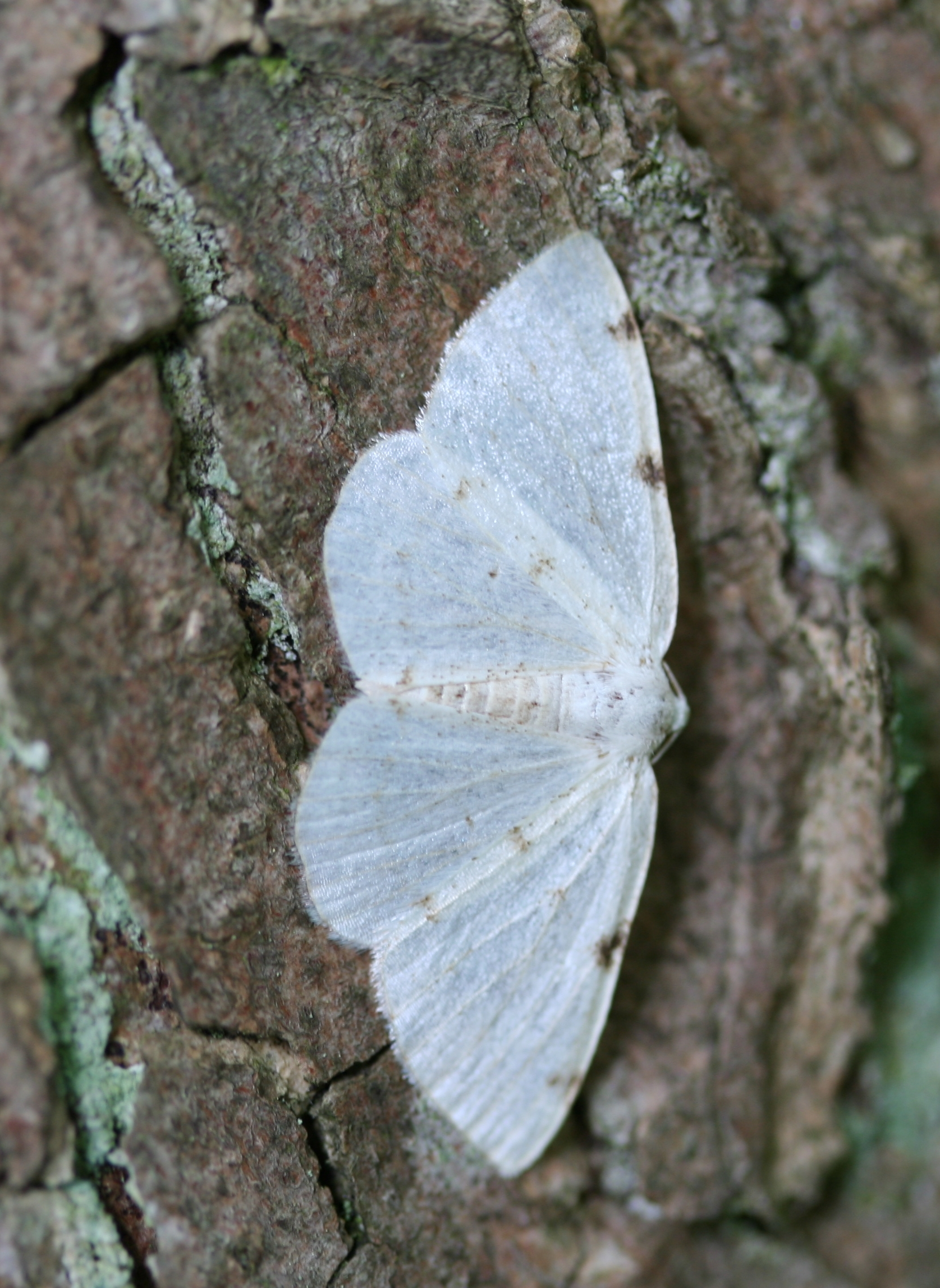
- Lomographa bimaculata

Scientific classification
- Domain: Eukaryota
- Kingdom: Animalia
- Phylum: Arthropoda
- Class: Insecta
- Order: Lepidoptera
- Family: Geometridae
- Subfamily: Ennominae
- Tribe: Baptini

= Baptini =

Tribe of moths

Baptini is a tribe of geometer moths in the subfamily Ennominae.

== Genera ==
- Borbacha Moore, [1887]
- Bulonga Walker, 1859
- Crypsicometa Warren, 1894
- Curbia Warren, 1894
- Eurychoria Prout, 1916
- Eurytaphria Warren, 1893
- Hypoplectis Hübner, 1823
- Hypulia Swinhoe, 1894
- Lomographa Hübner, [1825]
- Nothomiza Warren, 1894
- Palyas Guenée in Boisduval & Guenée, 1857
- Parasynegia Warren, 1893
- Phrygionis Hübner, [1825]
- Platycerota Hampson, 1893
- Plesiomorpha Warren, 1898
- Rhynchobapta Hampson, 1895
- Synegia Guenée in Boisduval & Guenée, 1857
- Tasta Walker, [1863]
- Yashmakia Warren, 1901
