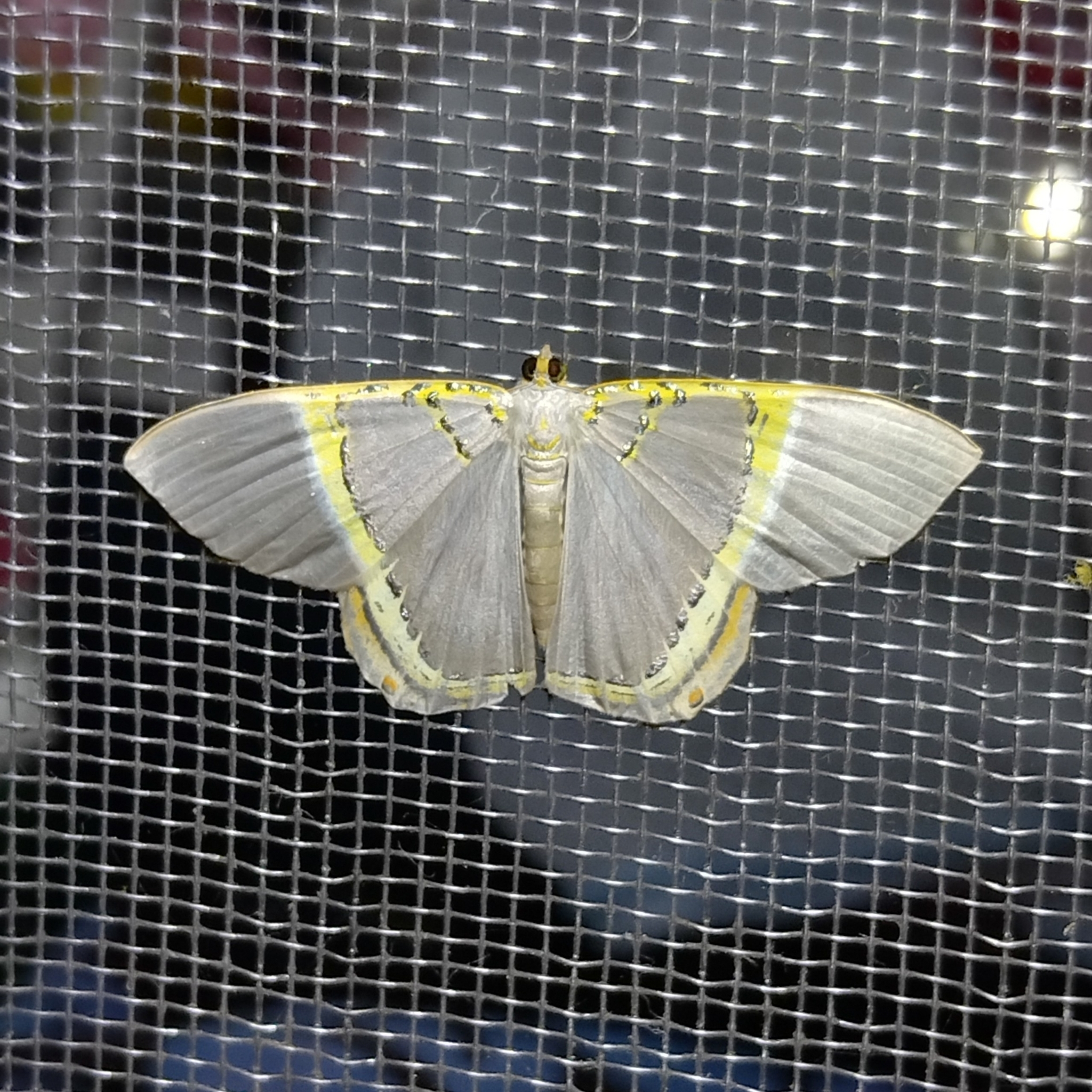
- Phrygionis privignaria, Bolivia

Scientific classification
- Kingdom: Animalia
- Phylum: Arthropoda
- Class: Insecta
- Order: Lepidoptera
- Family: Geometridae
- Subfamily: Ennominae
- Tribe: Palyadini
- Genus: Phrygionis
- Species: P. privignaria

Binomial name
- Phrygionis privignaria (Guenée in Boisduval and Guenée, 1858)

= Phrygionis privignaria =

Species of moth

Phrygionis privignaria is a moth in the family Geometridae described by Achille Guenée in 1858. It is distributed over the Caribbean, North, Central and South America.

The MONA or Hodges number for Phrygionis privignaria is 6671.2.
