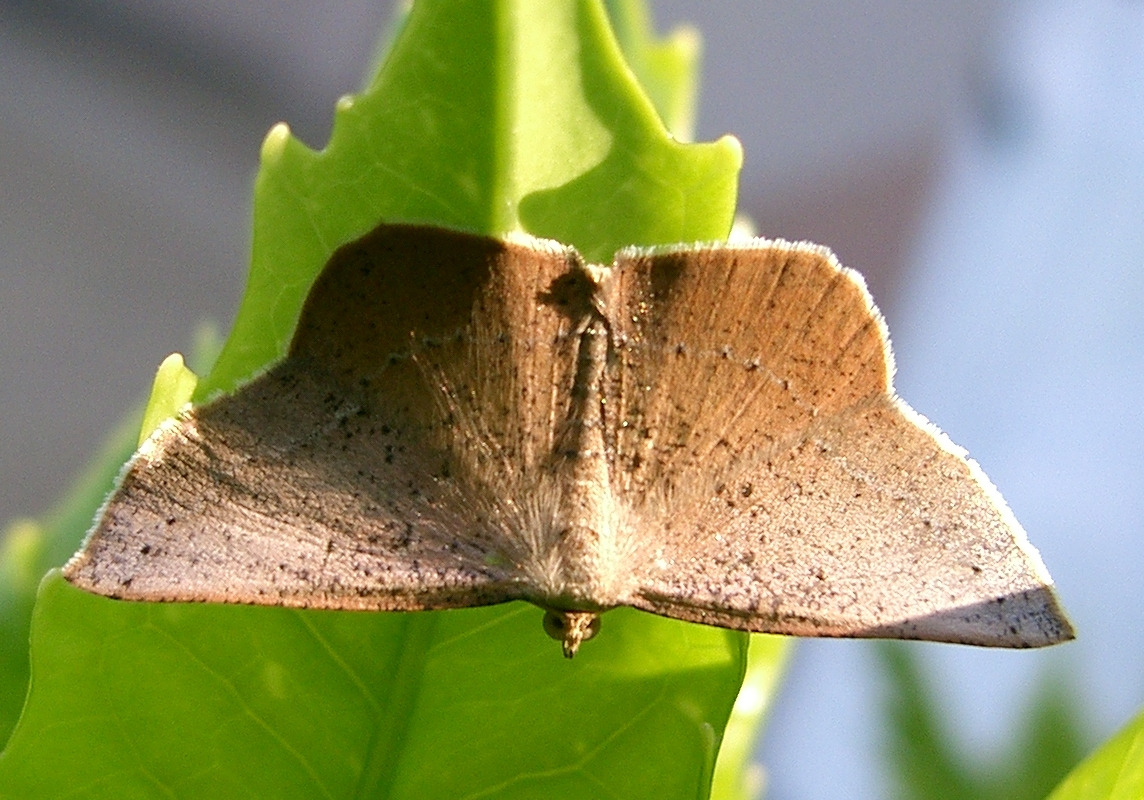

Scientific classification
- Domain: Eukaryota
- Kingdom: Animalia
- Phylum: Arthropoda
- Class: Insecta
- Order: Lepidoptera
- Family: Geometridae
- Genus: Plesiomorpha
- Species: P. punctilinearia

Binomial name
- Plesiomorpha punctilinearia (Leech, 1891)

= Plesiomorpha punctilinearia =

Species of moth

Plesiomorpha punctilinearia is a moth of the family Geometridae first described by John Henry Leech in 1891. It is found in Japan and the Ryukyu Islands.

The wingspan is 26–27 mm.
