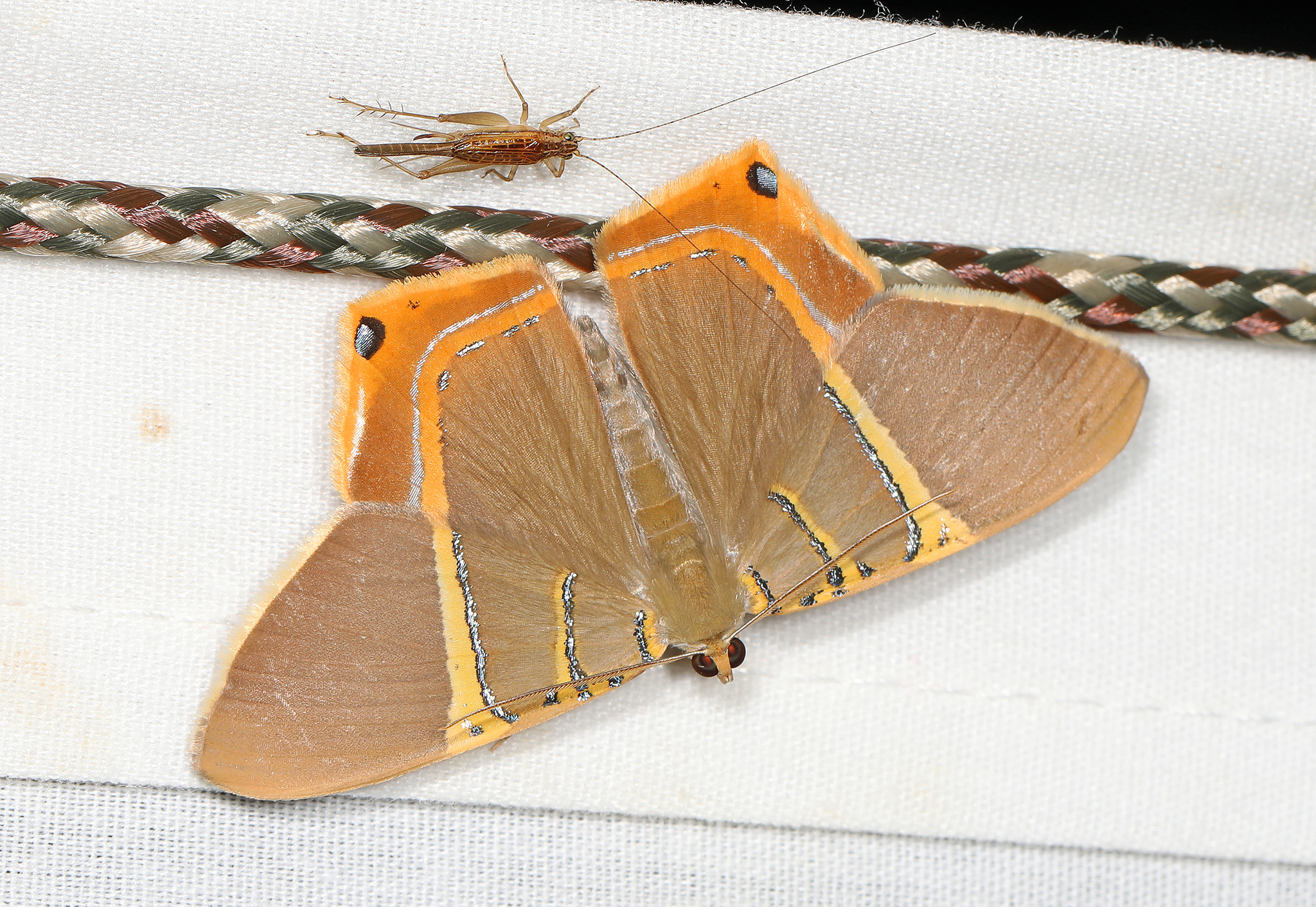
- Phrygionis polita, Colombia

Scientific classification
- Domain: Eukaryota
- Kingdom: Animalia
- Phylum: Arthropoda
- Class: Insecta
- Order: Lepidoptera
- Family: Geometridae
- Tribe: Palyadini
- Genus: Phrygionis
- Species: P. polita

Binomial name
- Phrygionis polita (Cramer)

Synonyms
- Byssodes appropriata Walker, 1861; Phalaena polita Cramer; Phrygionis amblopa Prout, 1933; Phrygionis isthmia Prout, 1911; Phrygionis marta Prout, 1933; Phrygionis miura Prout, 1933; Phrygionis modesta Warren, 1904; Phrygionis politulata Guenée, 1858; Phrygionis sestertiana Prout, 1933; Phrygionis stenotaenia Prout, 1933; Ratiaria metaxantha Walker, 1861

= Phrygionis polita =

Species of moth

Phrygionis polita is a species in the moth family Geometridae found in Central and South America.
