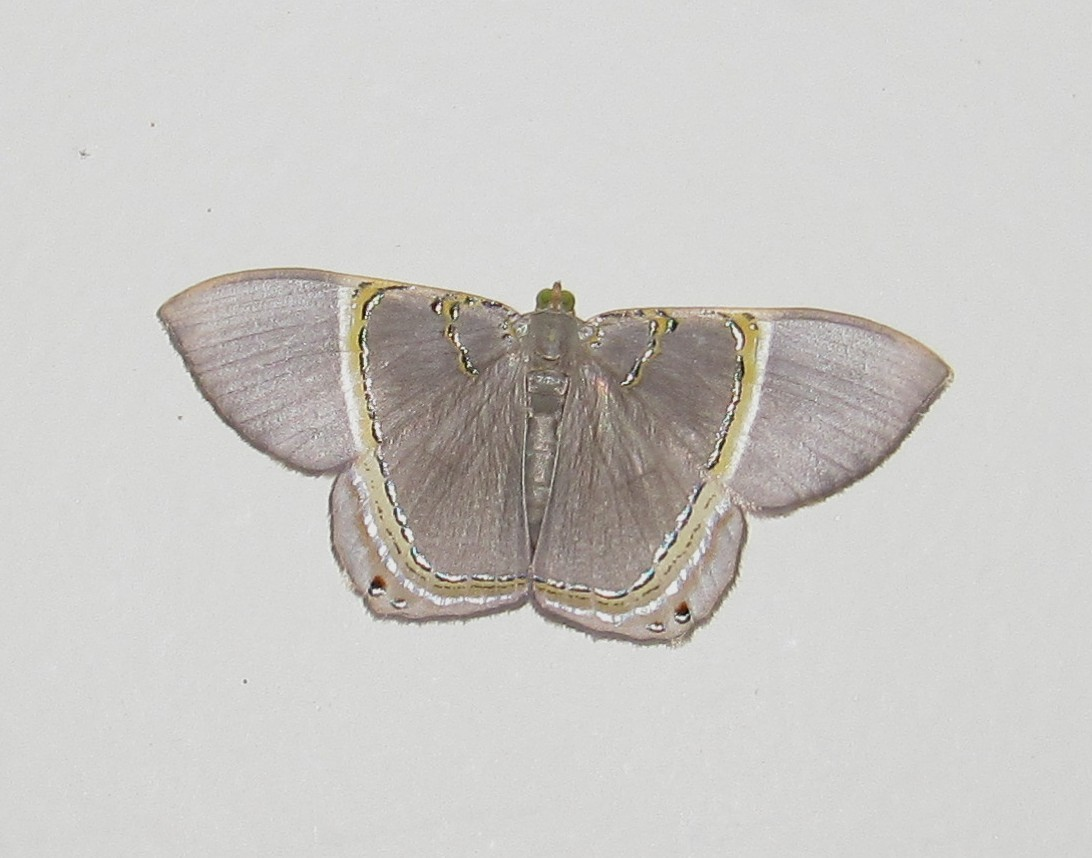
- Phrygionis paradoxata incolorata, Brazil

Scientific classification
- Kingdom: Animalia
- Phylum: Arthropoda
- Class: Insecta
- Order: Lepidoptera
- Family: Geometridae
- Subfamily: Ennominae
- Tribe: Palyadini
- Genus: Phrygionis
- Species: P. paradoxata

Binomial name
- Phrygionis paradoxata (Guenée, 1858)

Synonyms
- Phrygionis incolorata paradoxata; Phrygionis argentistriata Strecker, 1876

= Phrygionis paradoxata =

Species of moth

Phrygionis paradoxata, the jeweled satyr moth or silvery phrygionis, is a moth of the family Geometridae. The species was first described by Achille Guenée in 1858. It is found in South America, Central America, Florida, and the Caribbean.

== Subspecies ==
These three subspecies belong to the species Phrygionis paradoxata:

- Phrygionis paradoxata incolorata Prout, 1910
- Phrygionis paradoxata paradoxata (Guenée, [1858])
- Phrygionis paradoxata steeleorum Brown, 1991
