= Eurychoria =

Scientific classification
- Kingdom: Animalia
- Phylum: Arthropoda
- Clade: Pancrustacea
- Class: Insecta
- Order: Lepidoptera
- Family: Geometridae
- Tribe: Baptini
- Genus: Eurychoria; Prout, 1916

Genus of moths

Eurychoria is a genus of moths in the family Geometridae erected by Louis Beethoven Prout in 1916.

== Species ==
- Eurychoria oenoptila Prout, 1916 New Guinea
- Eurychoria perata Prout, 1928 Sumatra, Java
- Eurychoria pia West, 1929 Luzon in the Philippines
- Eurychoria trajecta Prout, 1932 Borneo, Peninsular Malaysia
- Eurychoria gerasphora (Turner, 1947) Australia
- Eurychoria fictilis (Turner, 1919) Australia

== Sources ==
- Pitkin, Brian & Jenkins, Paul. "Search results Family: Geometridae". Butterflies and Moths of the World. Natural History Museum, London.
