= Bulonga =

Scientific classification
- Kingdom: Animalia
- Phylum: Arthropoda
- Class: Insecta
- Order: Lepidoptera
- Family: Geometridae
- Tribe: Baptini
- Genus: Bulonga; Walker, 1859

Synonyms
- Antibadistes Warren, 1896

Genus of moths

Bulonga is a genus of moths in the family Geometridae described by Walker in 1859.

== Species ==
- Bulonga distans Warren, 1896
- Bulonga griseosericea (Pagenstecher, 1889)
- Bulonga phillipsi Prout, 1930
- Bulonga schistacearia Walker, 1859
- Bulonga trilineata Bastelberger, 1905
