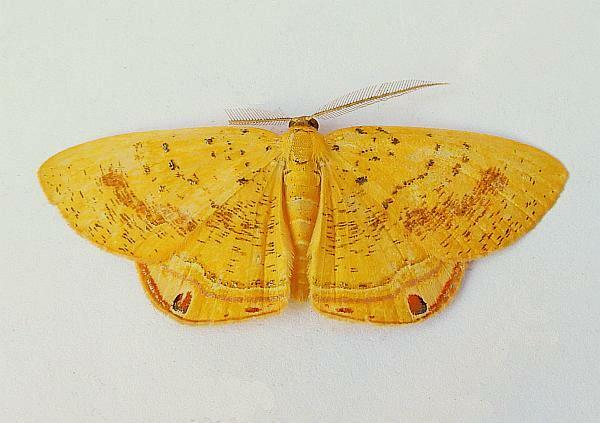
- In Florida

Scientific classification
- Kingdom: Animalia
- Phylum: Arthropoda
- Clade: Pancrustacea
- Class: Insecta
- Order: Lepidoptera
- Family: Geometridae
- Tribe: Palyadini
- Genus: Phrygionis
- Species: P. auriferaria

Binomial name
- Phrygionis auriferaria Hulst, 1887

Synonyms
- Phrygionis argyrosticta Hampson, 1904

= Phrygionis auriferaria =

Species of moth

Phrygionis auriferaria, the golden-winged palyas moth, is a species of geometrid moth in the family Geometridae. It is found in the Caribbean and Florida.
