= Palyas =

Scientific classification
- Kingdom: Animalia
- Phylum: Arthropoda
- Class: Insecta
- Order: Lepidoptera
- Family: Geometridae
- Tribe: Baptini
- Genus: Palyas; Guenée in Boisduval & Guenée, 1857

Genus of moths

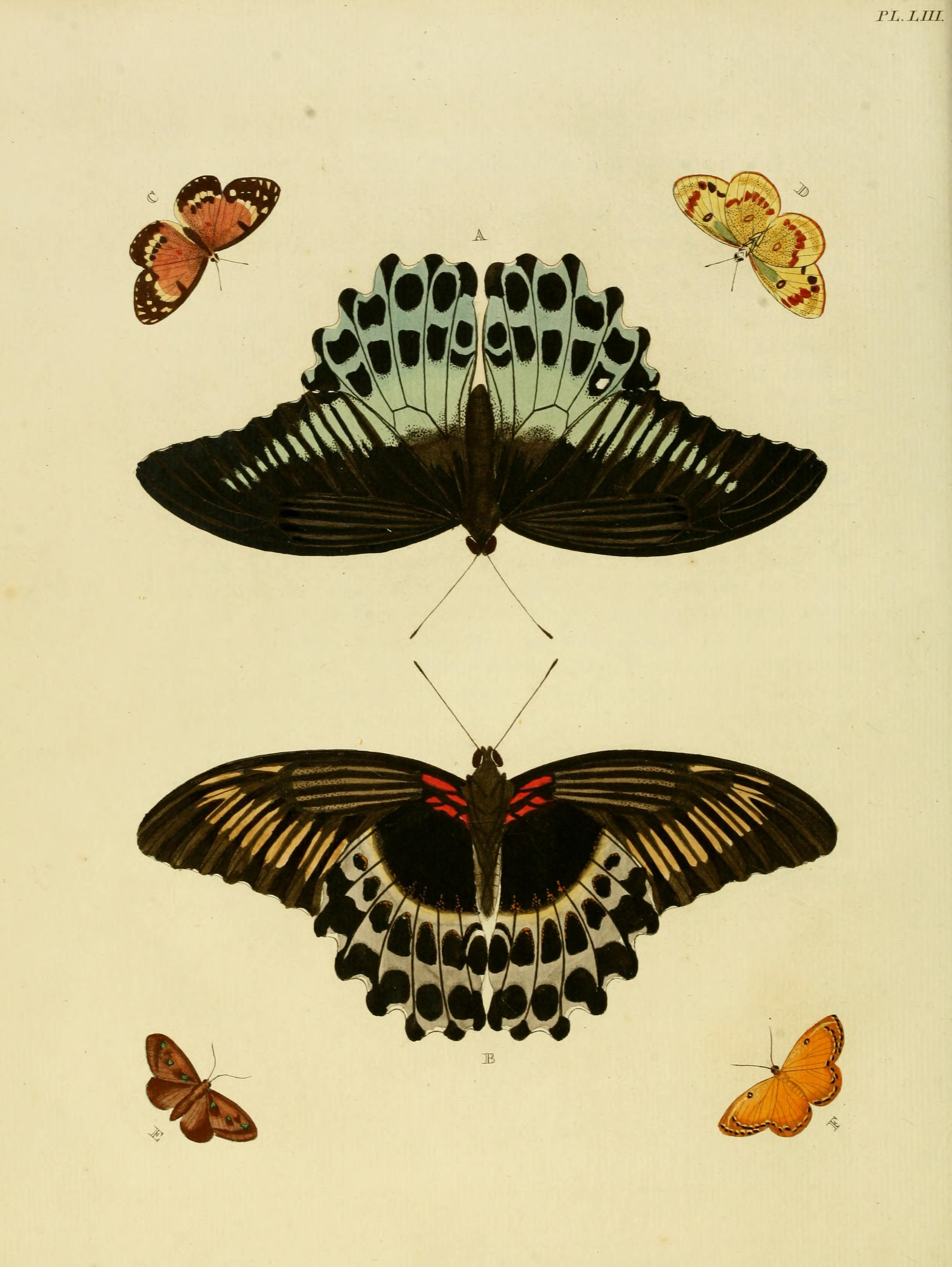

Palyas is a genus of moth in the family Geometridae first described by Achille Guenée in 1857.

== Species ==
- Palyas aura (Cramer, [1775])
- Palyas auriferaria (Hulst, 1887)
