= Synegia imitaria =

Scientific classification
- Kingdom: Animalia
- Phylum: Arthropoda
- Class: Insecta
- Order: Lepidoptera
- Family: Geometridae
- Genus: Synegia
- Species: S. imitaria

Binomial name
- Synegia imitaria (Walker, 1861)

Synonyms
- Anisodes imitaria Walker, 1861; Anisodes? obrimaria Walker, 1861; Syntaracta aemula Warren, 1894

Species of moth

Synegia imitaria is a moth of the family Geometridae first described by Francis Walker in 1861. It is found in Sri Lanka, India, Borneo, Peninsular Malaysia and Sumatra.

The larvae are cylindrical and olive green. Darker marbles and indistinct longitudinal bands are found on its body segments. A small, sub-spiracular whitish spot can be seen. Pupation occurs in a cocoon made by soil particles cemented with silk at the ground surface. Host plants include Piper hookeri and other Piper species.

One subspecies is recognized - Synegia imitaria malayana Prout, 1925.
