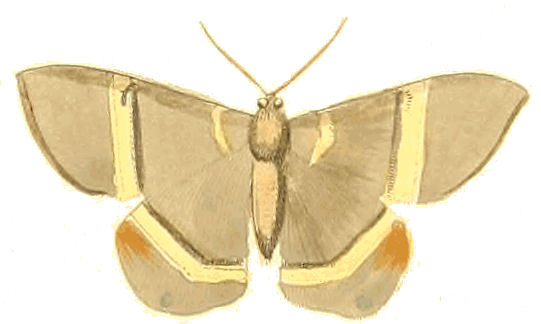
- Illustration by Dru Drury

Scientific classification
- Kingdom: Animalia
- Phylum: Arthropoda
- Class: Insecta
- Order: Lepidoptera
- Family: Geometridae
- Subfamily: Ennominae
- Tribe: Palyadini
- Genus: Phrygionis
- Species: P. argentata

Binomial name
- Phrygionis argentata (Drury, 1773)

Synonyms
- Phalaena argentata Drury, 1773; Geometra argentata (Drury, 1773) Westwood; Phrygionis cultaria Hübner, [1825]; Phalaena decorata Fabricius 1781

= Phrygionis argentata =

Species of moth

Phrygionis argentata is a species of moth in the family Geometridae. It was first described by Dru Drury in 1773 from Jamaica.

== Description ==
Upper Side. Antennae filiform. Body grey. Wings pale yellowish grey. A narrow yellow bar rises near the middle of the anterior wings, which, crossing them and the posterior, ends a little below the body on the abdominal edges; another small bar crosses the anterior wings near the shoulders, both of them being verged with silver. A small dark spot, surrounded with silver, is also placed close to the external edges of the posterior wings; and above it is a yellowish patch reaching to the upper corners.

Under Side. Wings pale light-coloured, almost white, immaculate. Margins of the wings entire. Wing-span 1¾ inches (44 mm).
