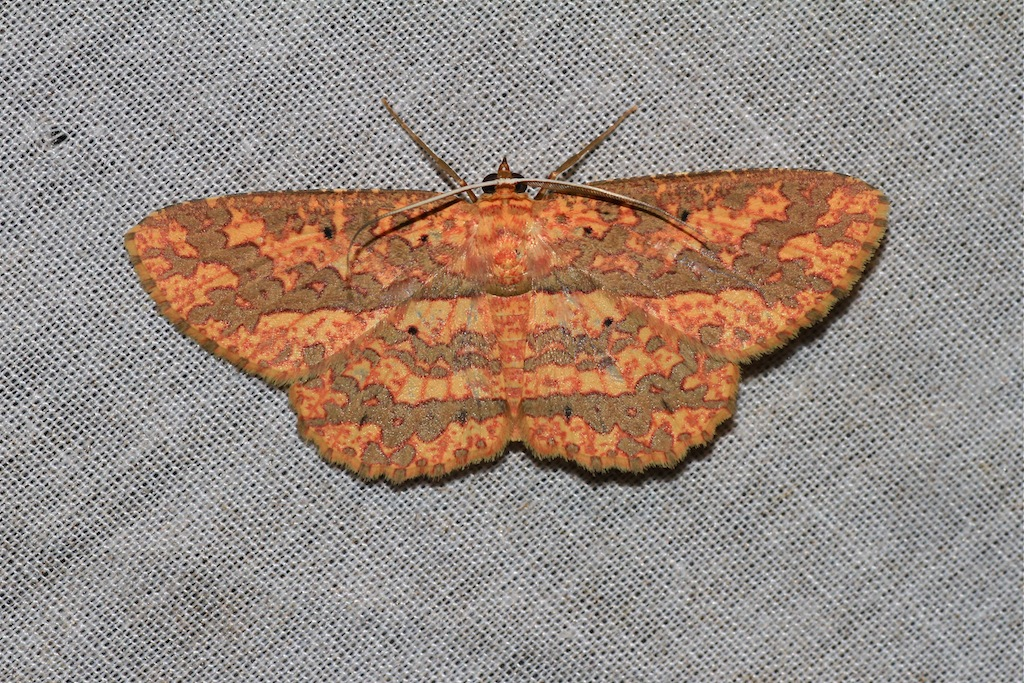

Scientific classification
- Kingdom: Animalia
- Phylum: Arthropoda
- Clade: Pancrustacea
- Class: Insecta
- Order: Lepidoptera
- Family: Geometridae
- Genus: Borbacha
- Species: B. punctipardaria

Binomial name
- Borbacha punctipardaria Holloway, 1982

= Borbacha punctipardaria =

Species of moth

Borbacha punctipardaria is a moth of the family Geometridae first described by Jeremy Daniel Holloway in 1982. It is found on Borneo, Sumatra, Nias and Java.

Adults have prominent black discal spots on both wings.
