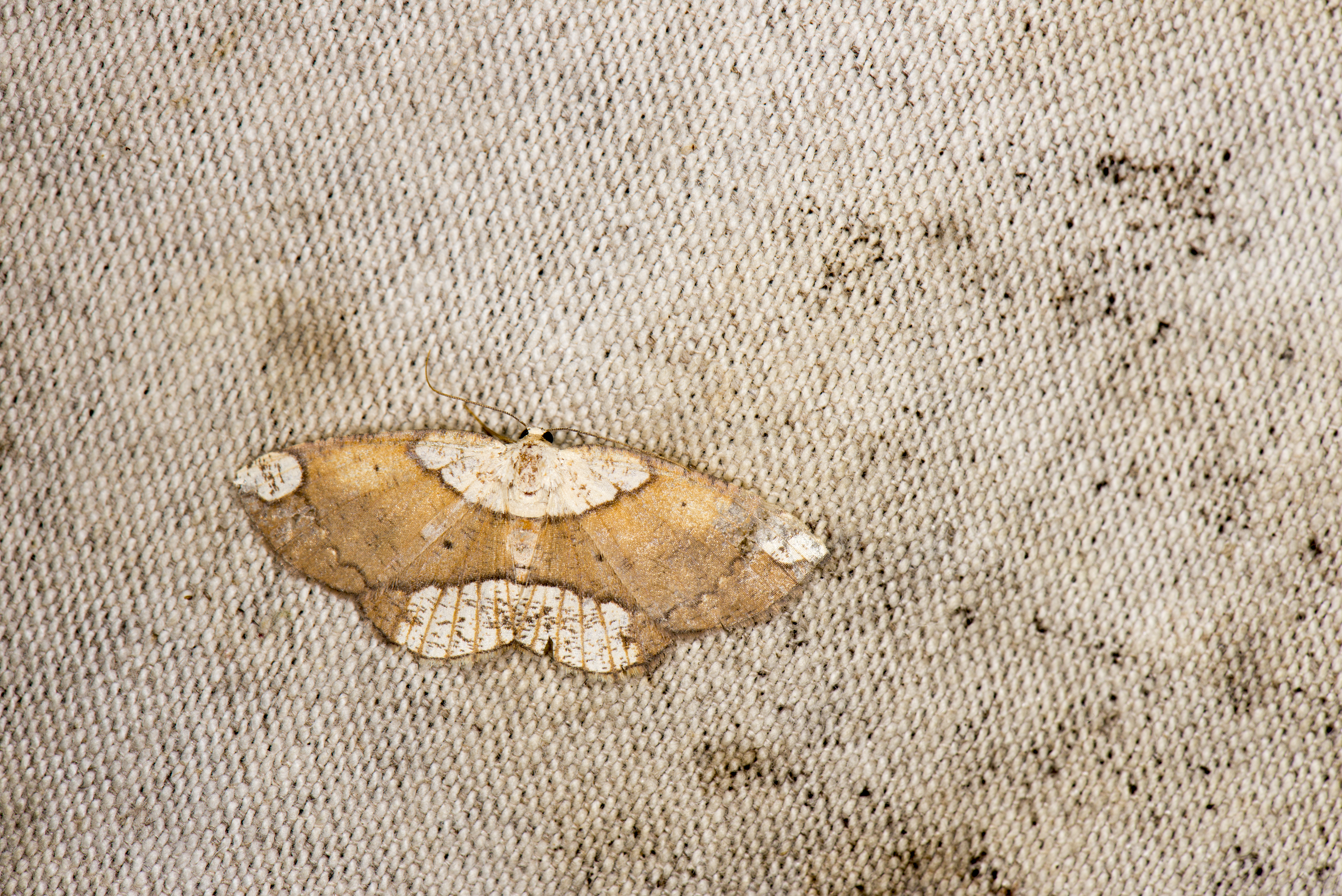

Scientific classification
- Kingdom: Animalia
- Phylum: Arthropoda
- Class: Insecta
- Order: Lepidoptera
- Family: Geometridae
- Tribe: Baptini
- Genus: Platycerota

= Platycerota =

Genus of moths

Platycerota is a genus of moths in the family Geometridae.

== Description ==
Palpi hairy and not reaching beyond frons. Antennae of male flattened and thickened with appressed serrations. Hind tibia not dilated. Forewings with rounded apex. Vein 3 from before angle of cell and vein 5 from above middle of discocellulars. Veins 7,8,9 stalked from before angle of cell. Veins 10,11 stalked and vein 11 anastomosing with vein 12 and veins 10 with 8 and 9. Hindwings with vein 3 from before angle of cell.
