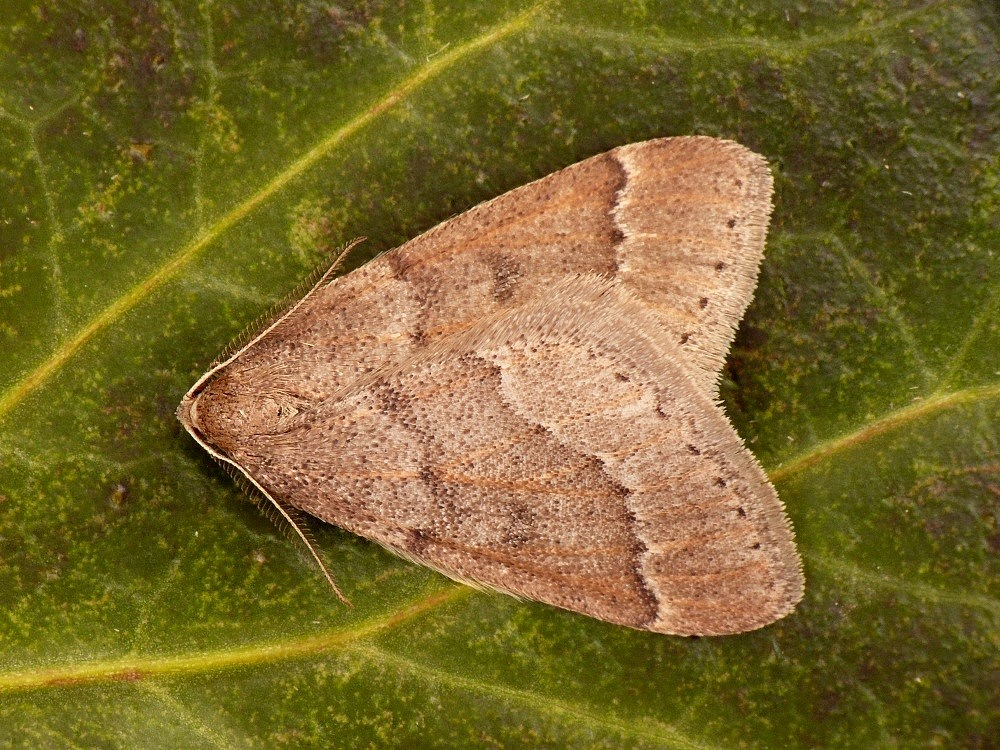
- Theria rupicapraria

Scientific classification
- Kingdom: Animalia
- Phylum: Arthropoda
- Clade: Pancrustacea
- Class: Insecta
- Order: Lepidoptera
- Family: Geometridae
- Subfamily: Ennominae
- Genus: Theria; Hübner, 1825

= Theria (moth) =

Genus of moths

Theria is a genus of moths in the family Geometridae erected by Jacob Hübner in 1825.

== Species ==
- Theria crypta Wehrli, 1940
- Theria primaria (Haworth, 1809)
- Theria rupicapraria (Denis & Schiffermüller, 1775)
