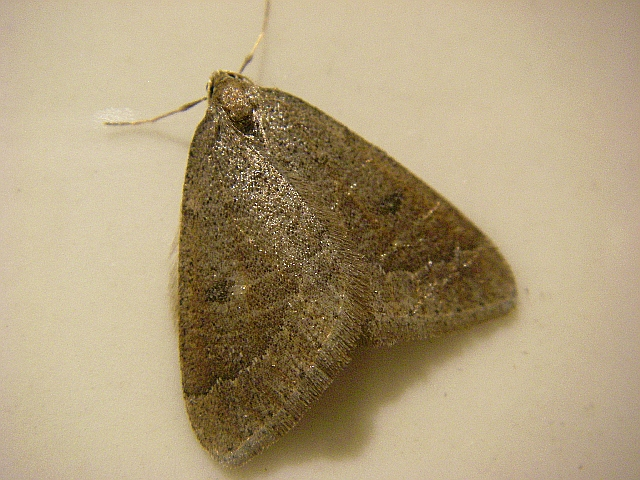

Scientific classification
- Domain: Eukaryota
- Kingdom: Animalia
- Phylum: Arthropoda
- Class: Insecta
- Order: Lepidoptera
- Family: Geometridae
- Genus: Theria
- Species: T. primaria

Binomial name
- Theria primaria (Haworth, 1809)

= Theria primaria =

Species of moth

Theria primaria, the early moth, is a moth of the family Geometridae. It is found throughout Western Europe and the South Caucasus.

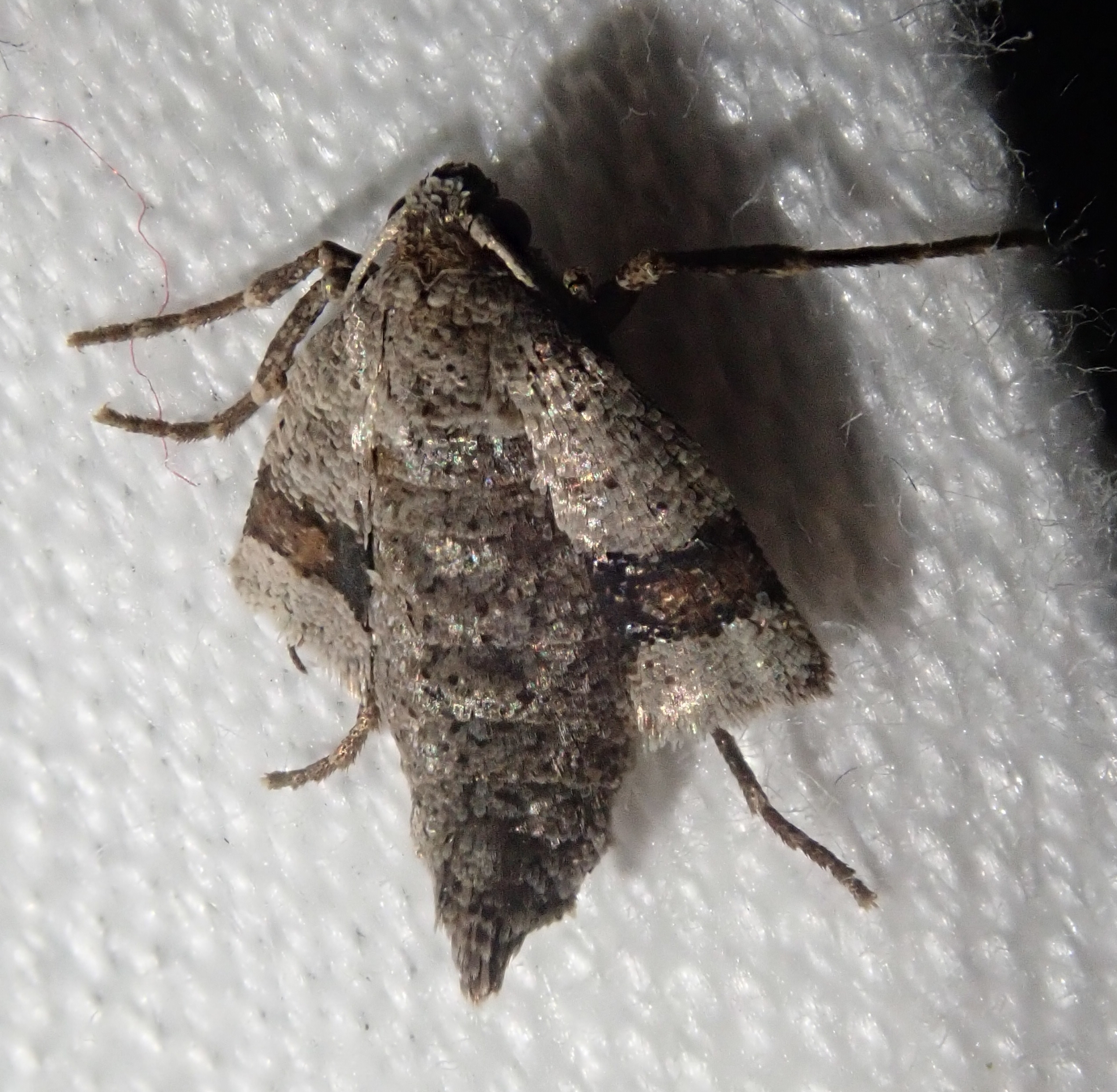
Female

The wingspan is 32–37 mm (1.3–1.5 in) and the forewings are 14–17 mm (0.55–0.67 in) long. The ground colour of the forewings is reddish brown. The male subterminal and antemedial lines are slightly wavy with the areas between these lines usually being a darker brown than the ground colour. The forewing apex is rounded and there is a small discal spot towards the costal edge. The hindwings are pale whitish brown with a tiny discal spot. Females have short wings (60% of the length of the abdomen."The male may be known at once by the large discal spot of the forewing and the 2 crenulate dark lines, white-edged on the reverse sides. The rudimentary wings of the female have the apex acute, the forewing bears 2 approximated dark lines, the intervening space often darkened into a band. — ab. ibicaria H.-Sch. is darker, with the lines obsolete."

The moth flies in January to February.

The larva feeds on hawthorn (Crataegus monogyna) and blackthorn (Prunus spinosa)

== Notes ==
1. The flight season refers to the British Isles. This may vary in other parts of the range.
