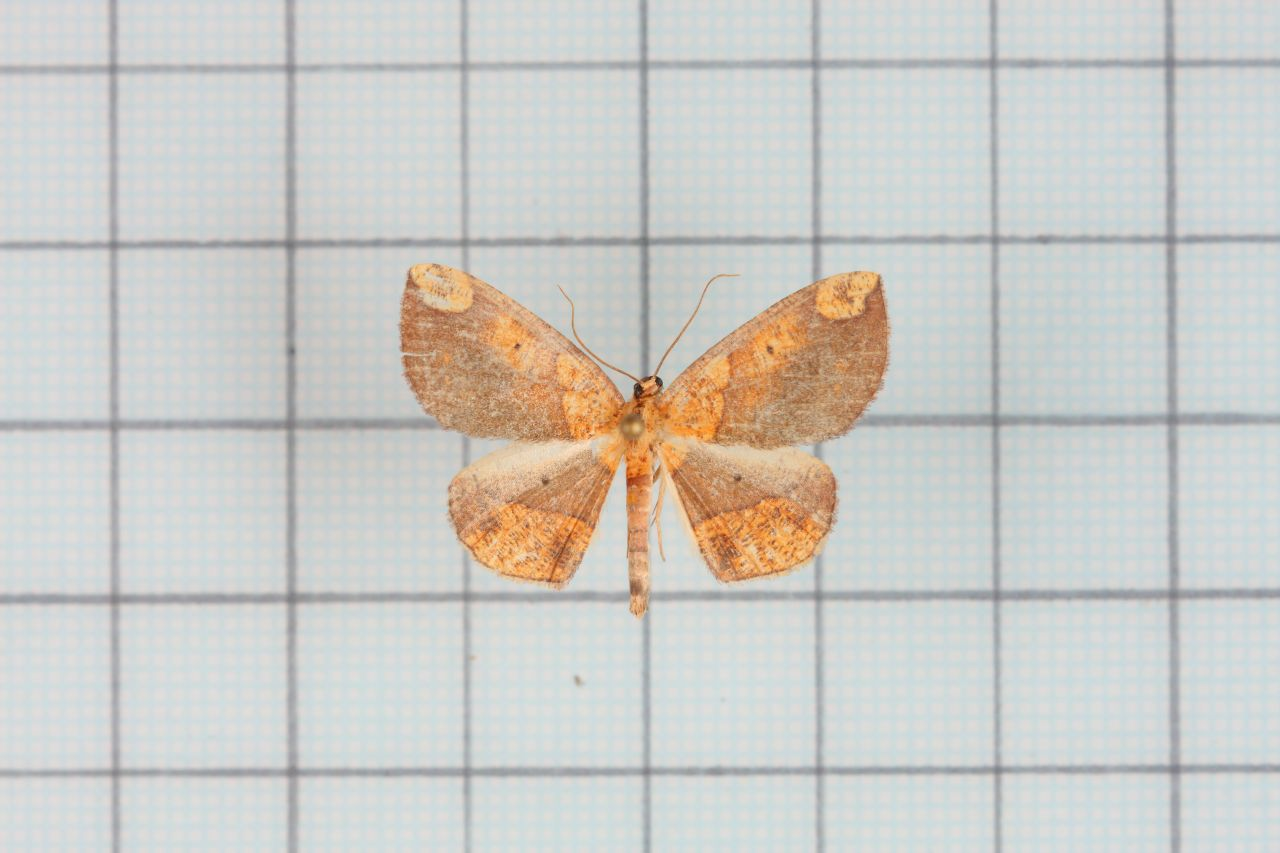

Scientific classification
- Kingdom: Animalia
- Phylum: Arthropoda
- Class: Insecta
- Order: Lepidoptera
- Family: Geometridae
- Genus: Crypsicometa
- Species: C. ochracea

Binomial name
- Crypsicometa ochracea Inoue, 1971

= Crypsicometa ochracea =

Species of moth

Crypsicometa ochracea is a moth of the family Geometridae first described by Hiroshi Inoue in 1971. It is found in Taiwan.

The wingspan is 28–30 mm.
