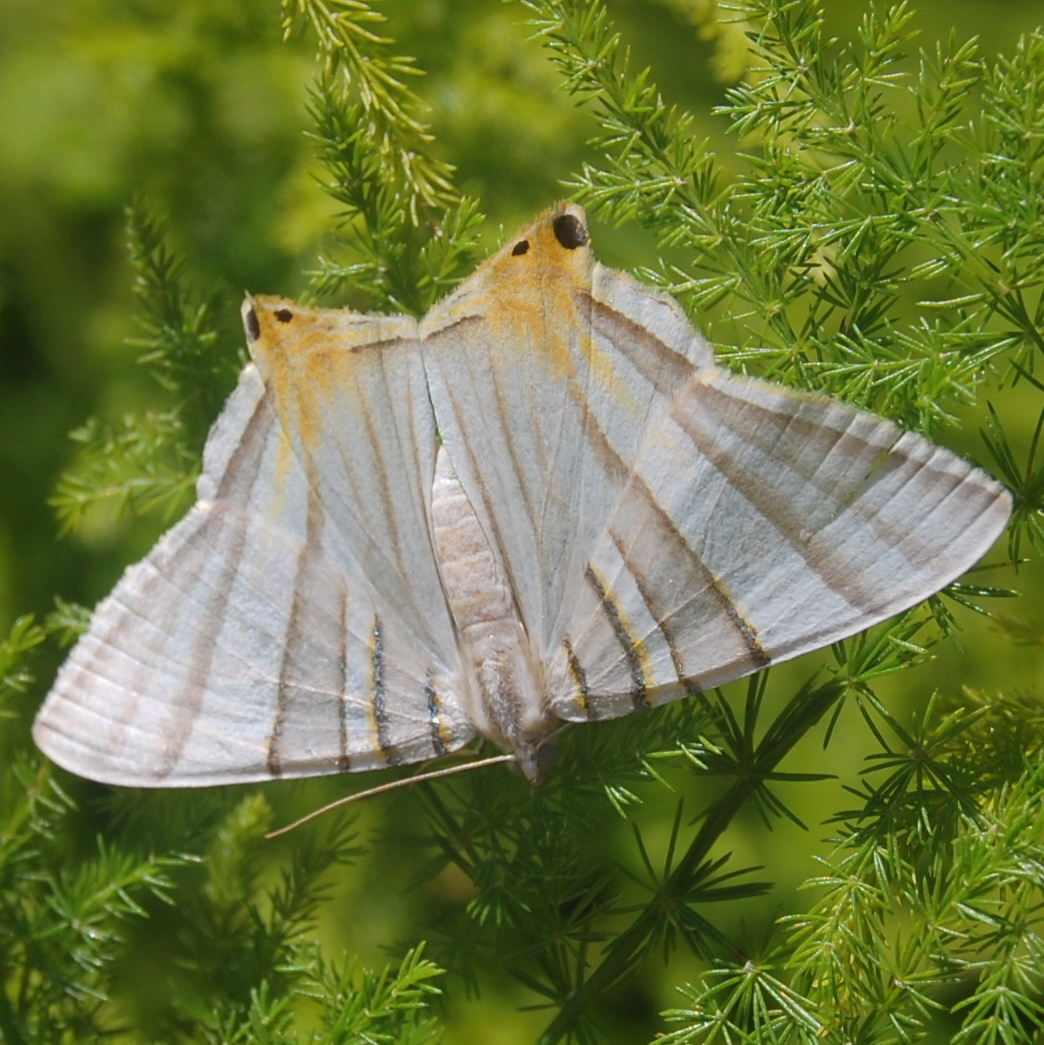
- Phrygionis platinata, Brazil

Scientific classification
- Kingdom: Animalia
- Phylum: Arthropoda
- Class: Insecta
- Order: Lepidoptera
- Family: Geometridae
- Tribe: Palyadini
- Genus: Phrygionis
- Species: P. platinata

Binomial name
- Phrygionis platinata (Guenée)

Synonyms
- Byssodes mollita Dognin, 1891; Ratiaria argentilinea Walker, 1861; Urapteryx platinata Guenée

= Phrygionis platinata =

Species of moth

Phrygionis platinata is a species in the moth family Geometridae found in Central and South America.

== Subspecies ==
These three subspecies belong to the species Phrygionis platinata:

- Phrygionis platinata citrina (Warren, 1897)
- Phrygionis platinata naevia (Druce, 1892)
- Phrygionis platinata platinata (Guenée, [1858])
