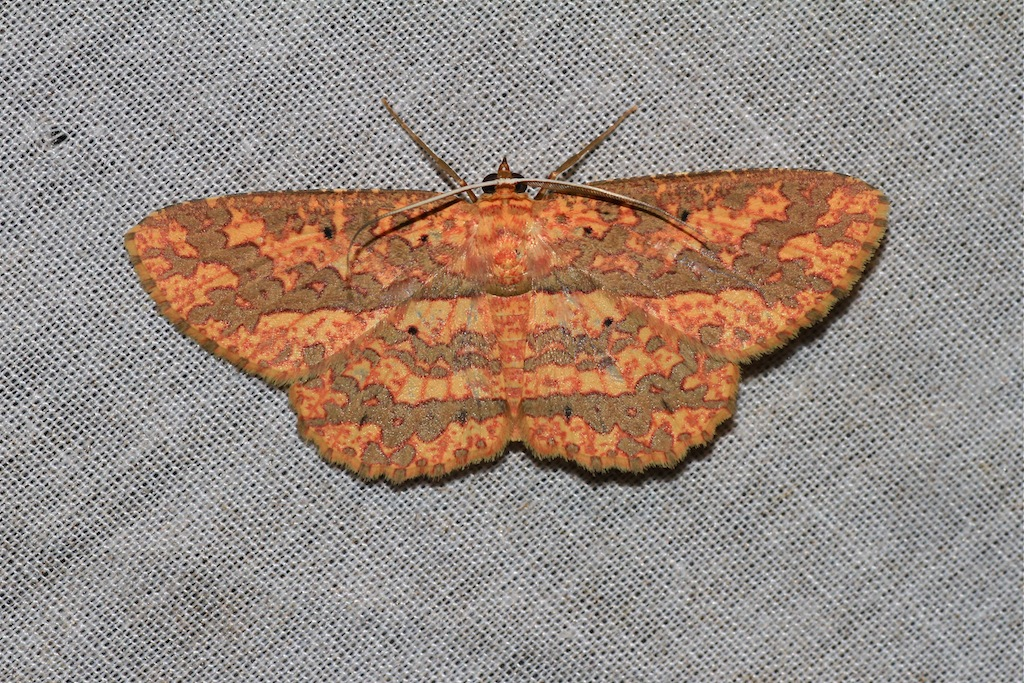

Scientific classification
- Domain: Eukaryota
- Kingdom: Animalia
- Phylum: Arthropoda
- Class: Insecta
- Order: Lepidoptera
- Family: Geometridae
- Tribe: Baptini
- Genus: Borbacha; Moore, [1887]

= Borbacha =

Genus of moths

Borbacha is a genus of moths in the family Geometridae.

== Species ==
- Borbacha altipardaria Holloway, 1982
- Borbacha bipardaria Holloway, 1982
- Borbacha euchrysa (Lower, 1894)
- Borbacha monopardaria Holloway, 1982
- Borbacha pardalis (Felder & Rogenhofer, 1875)
- Borbacha pardaria (Guenée, 1857)
- Borbacha punctipardaria Holloway, 1982
