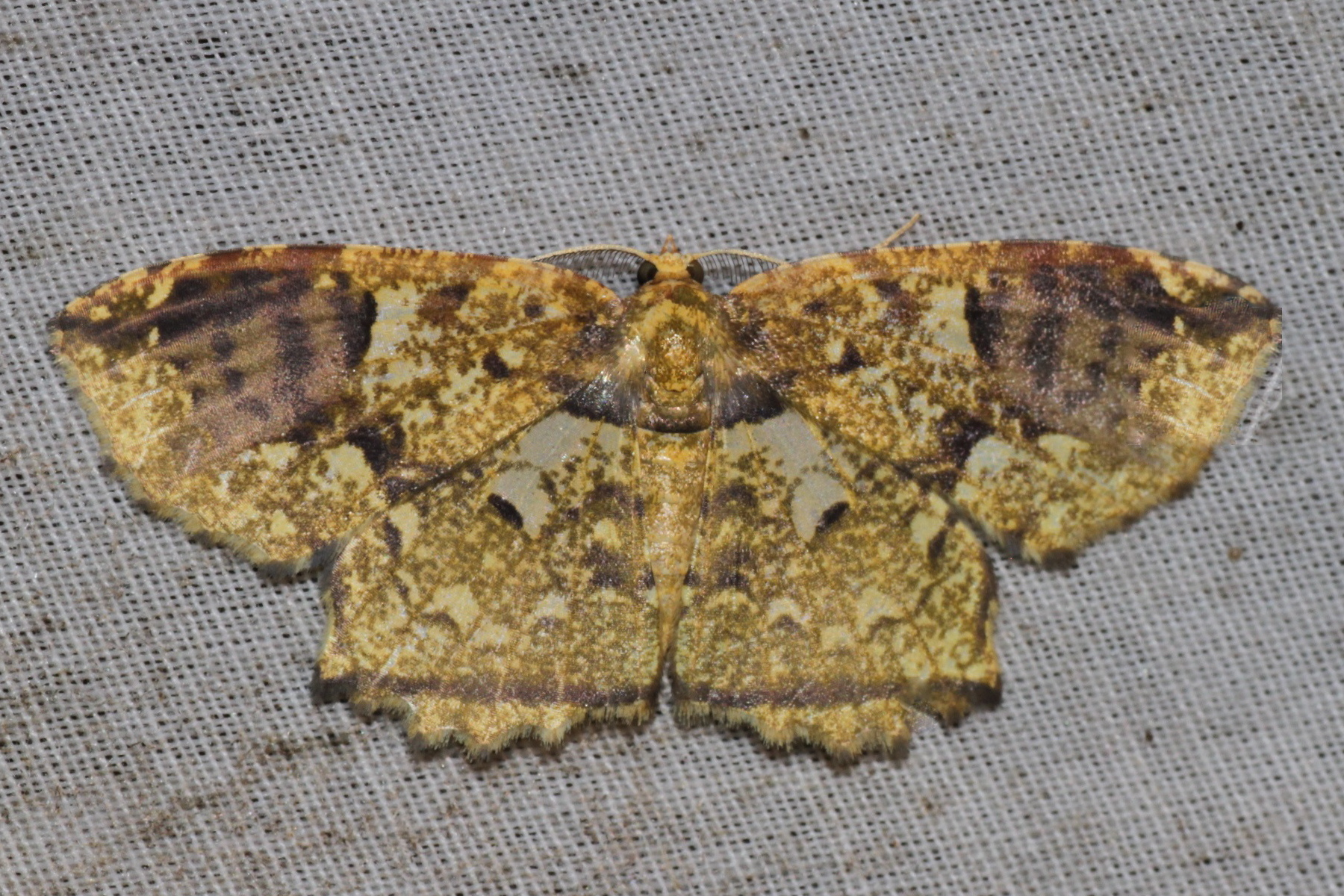
- Yashmakia orsinephes

Scientific classification
- Kingdom: Animalia
- Phylum: Arthropoda
- Clade: Pancrustacea
- Class: Insecta
- Order: Lepidoptera
- Family: Geometridae
- Tribe: Baptini
- Genus: Yashmakia; Warren, 1901

= Yashmakia =

Genus of moths

Yashmakia is a genus of moths in the family Geometridae described by Warren in 1901.

== Species ==
- Yashmakia vanbraeckeli Debauch, 1941 Sulawesi
- Yashmakia purpurascens (Warren, 1894) Ichang
- Yashmakia medionubis (Prout, 1925) north-eastern Himalayas
- Yashmakia suffusa (Warren, 1893) north-eastern Himalayas
- Yashmakia erythra (Hampson, 1891) southern India
- Yashmakia conflagrata (Hampson, 1912) southern India
- Yashmakia submissa (Warren, 1894) north-eastern Himalayas
- Yashmakia veneris Warren, 1901 Borneo, Sumatra
- Yashmakia loxozyga Holloway, 1993 Borneo, Sulawesi
- Yashmakia orsinephes (Prout, 1928) Sumatra, Borneo
- Yashmakia bigrisea Holloway, 1993 Borneo, Sumatra, Bali
