= Hypulia =

Scientific classification
- Kingdom: Animalia
- Phylum: Arthropoda
- Class: Insecta
- Order: Lepidoptera
- Family: Geometridae
- Tribe: Baptini
- Genus: Hypulia; Swinhoe, 1894

Genus of moths

Hypulia is a genus of moths in the family Geometridae described by Swinhoe in 1894.

== Species ==
- Hypulia dirempta (Walker, 1861) India, Singapore
- Hypulia continua (Walker, 1861) Borneo, Peninsular Malaysia (Penang), Sumatra, Andamans
- Hypulia strictiva Prout, 1932 Borneo
- Hypulia eleuthera Holloway, 1993 Peninsular Malaysia, Singapore, Borneo, possibly Sumatra
- Hypulia convoluta Holloway, 1993
