= Plesiomorpha vulpecula =

Scientific classification
- Domain: Eukaryota
- Kingdom: Animalia
- Phylum: Arthropoda
- Class: Insecta
- Order: Lepidoptera
- Family: Geometridae
- Genus: Plesiomorpha
- Species: P. vulpecula

Binomial name
- Plesiomorpha vulpecula Warren, 1898

Species of moth

Plesiomorpha vulpecula is a moth of the family Geometridae first described by William Warren in 1898. It is found in the Khasi Hills of India.
