= Curbia =

Scientific classification
- Kingdom: Animalia
- Phylum: Arthropoda
- Class: Insecta
- Order: Lepidoptera
- Family: Geometridae
- Tribe: Baptini
- Genus: Curbia; Warren, 1894
- Species: C. martiata

Binomial name
- Curbia martiata (Guenée, 1857)

Synonyms
- Crocopteryx martiata Guenée, 1857; Ephyra quadristrigaria Walker, 1859; Crocopteryx martiata Guenée, 1858

Genus of moths

Curbia is a monotypic moth genus in the family Geometridae described by Warren in 1894. Its single species, Curbia martiata, described by Achille Guenée in 1857, is found in Peninsular Malaysia, Sumatra and Borneo.
