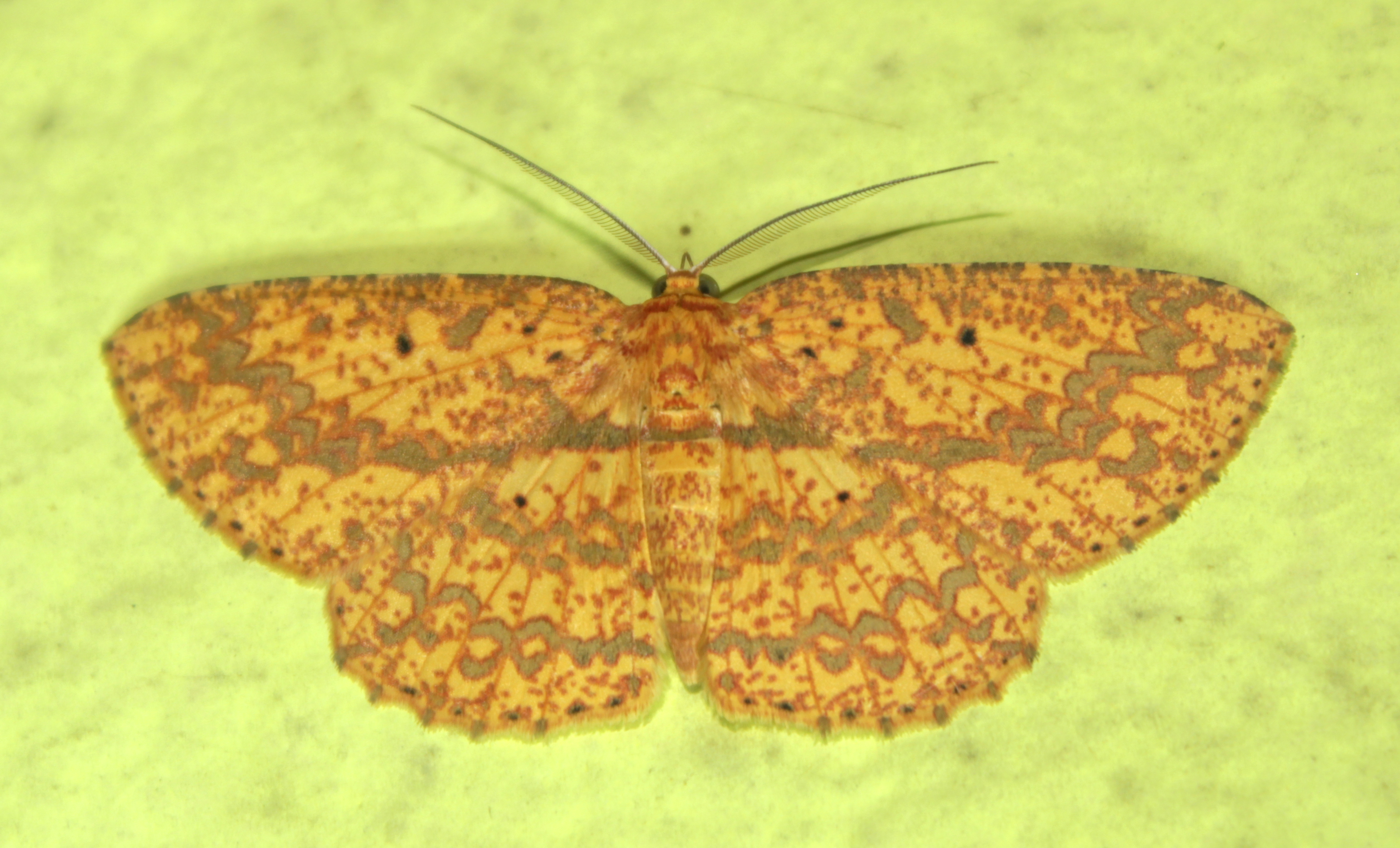
- In Kanjirappally, Kerala, India

Scientific classification
- Kingdom: Animalia
- Phylum: Arthropoda
- Class: Insecta
- Order: Lepidoptera
- Family: Geometridae
- Genus: Borbacha
- Species: B. pardaria

Binomial name
- Borbacha pardaria (Guenée, 1857)

Synonyms
- Anisodes pardaria Guenée, 1857

= Borbacha pardaria =

Species of moth

Borbacha pardaria is a moth of the family Geometridae first described by Achille Guenée in 1857. It is found in India (north-east Himalaya), Sundaland, Sulawesi and probably in Sri Lanka,

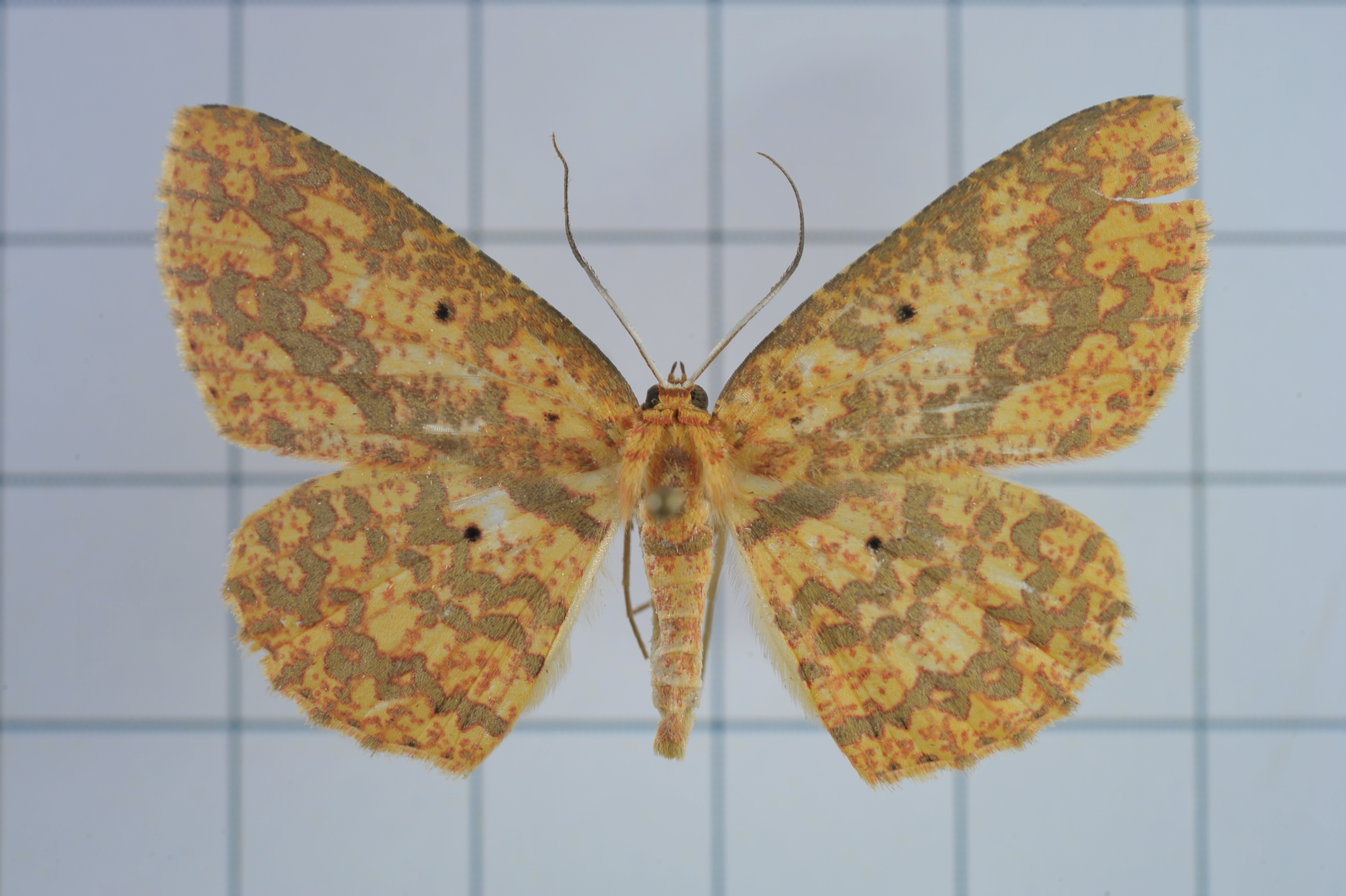

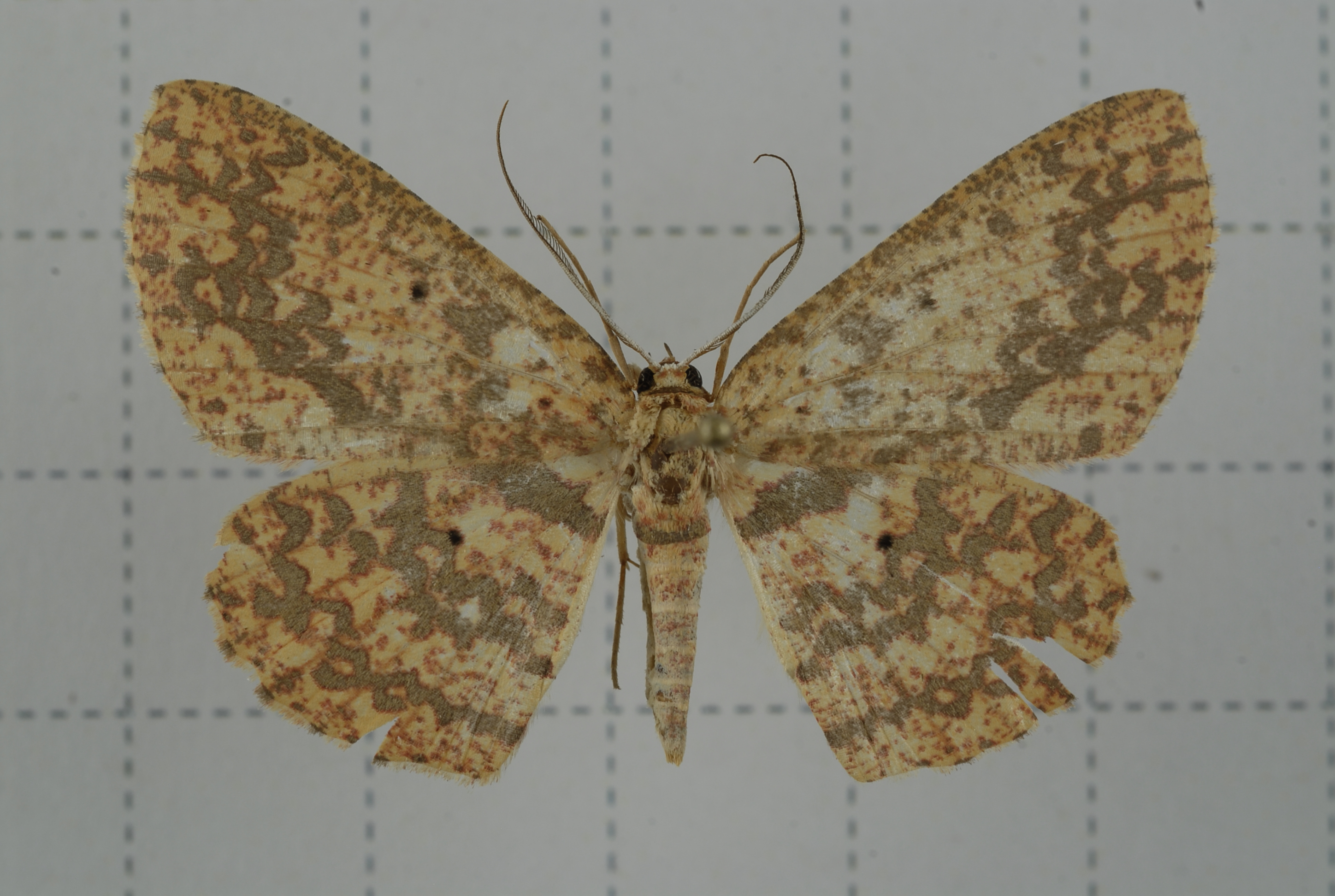

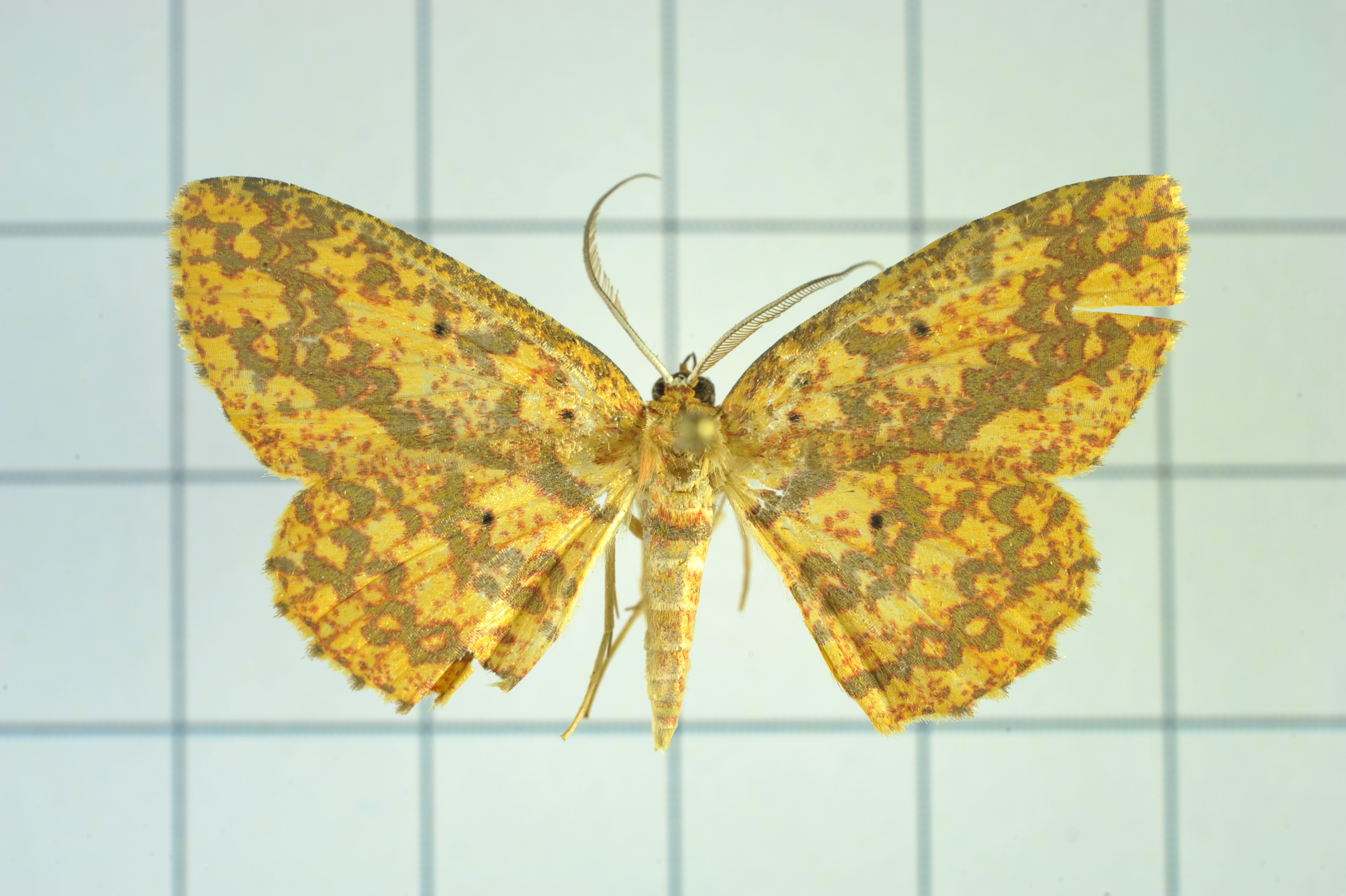

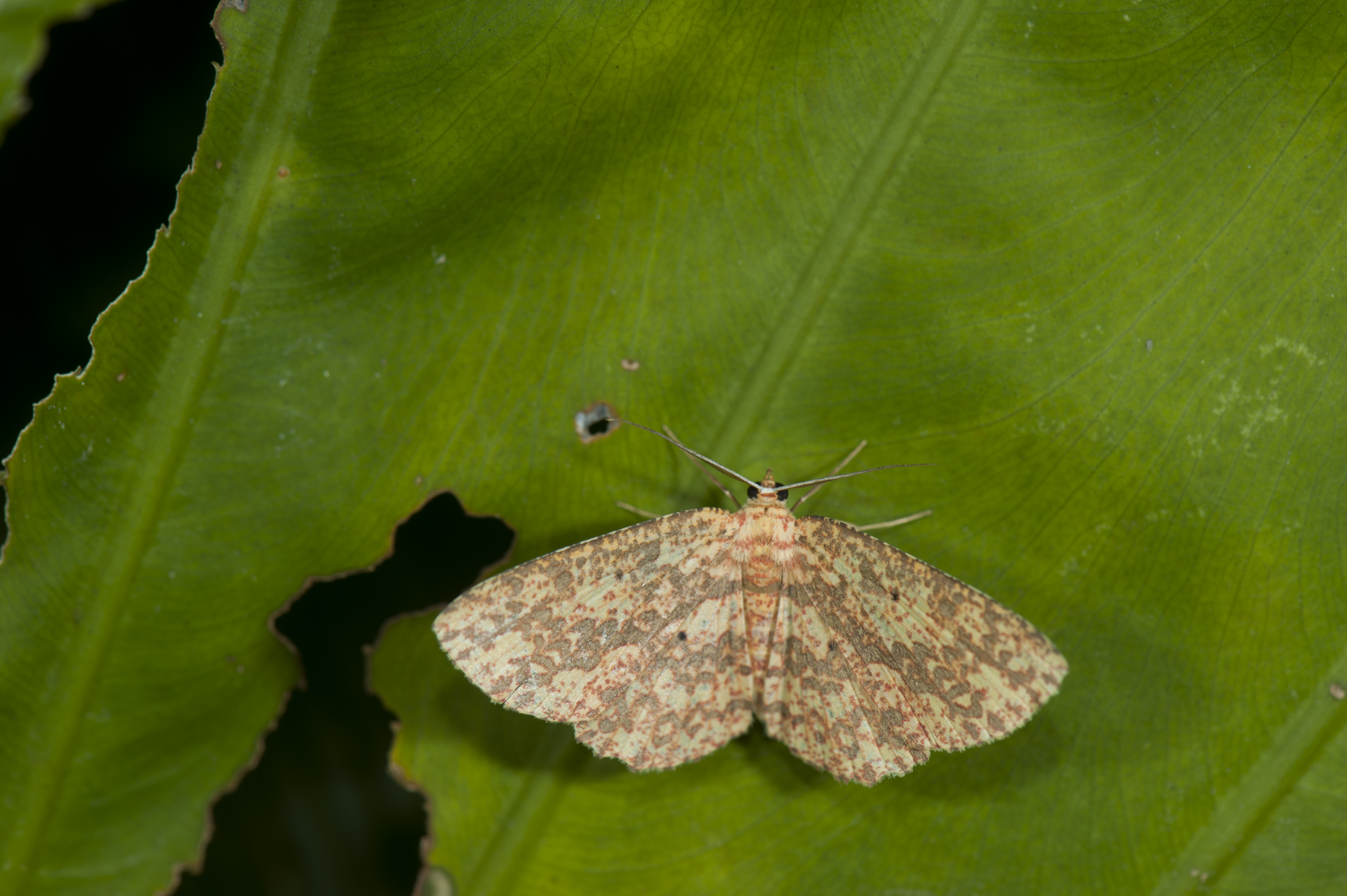
