= Parasynegia =

Scientific classification
- Kingdom: Animalia
- Phylum: Arthropoda
- Class: Insecta
- Order: Lepidoptera
- Family: Geometridae
- Tribe: Baptini
- Genus: Parasynegia; Warren, 1893

Genus of moths

Parasynegia is a genus of moths in the family Geometridae first described by Warren in 1893.

== Species ==
- Parasynegia pluristriaria (Walker, [1863]) India
- Parasynegia diffusaria (Moore, [1868]) Bengal
- Parasynegia macularia Warren, 1894 Sikkim
- Parasynegia sundatriaria Holloway, 1993 Borneo, Sumatra
- Parasynegia lineata (Warren, 1896) Java, Nias, Borneo
- Parasynegia fortilineata Holloway, 1993 Borneo, Peninsular Malaysia (Perak)
