= Eurytaphria =

Scientific classification
- Kingdom: Animalia
- Phylum: Arthropoda
- Class: Insecta
- Order: Lepidoptera
- Family: Geometridae
- Tribe: Baptini
- Genus: Eurytaphria; Warren, 1893

Synonyms
- Microxena Warren, 1897; Psilotaphria Warren, 1895

Genus of moths

Eurytaphria is a genus of moths in the family Geometridae first described by Warren in 1893.

== Species ==
- Eurytaphria undilineata Warren, 1893 Sikkim in India
- Eurytaphria xanthoperata Hampson, 1896 India, Sri Lanka, Bali
- Eurytaphria bisinuata Hampson, 1895 northeastern Himalayas
- Eurytaphria punctilineata (Hampson, 1895) southern India, Sri Lanka
- Eurytaphria chlorochroa (Meyrick, 1897) Borneo, Sumatra, Bali
- Eurytaphria melinau Holloway, 1993 Borneo
