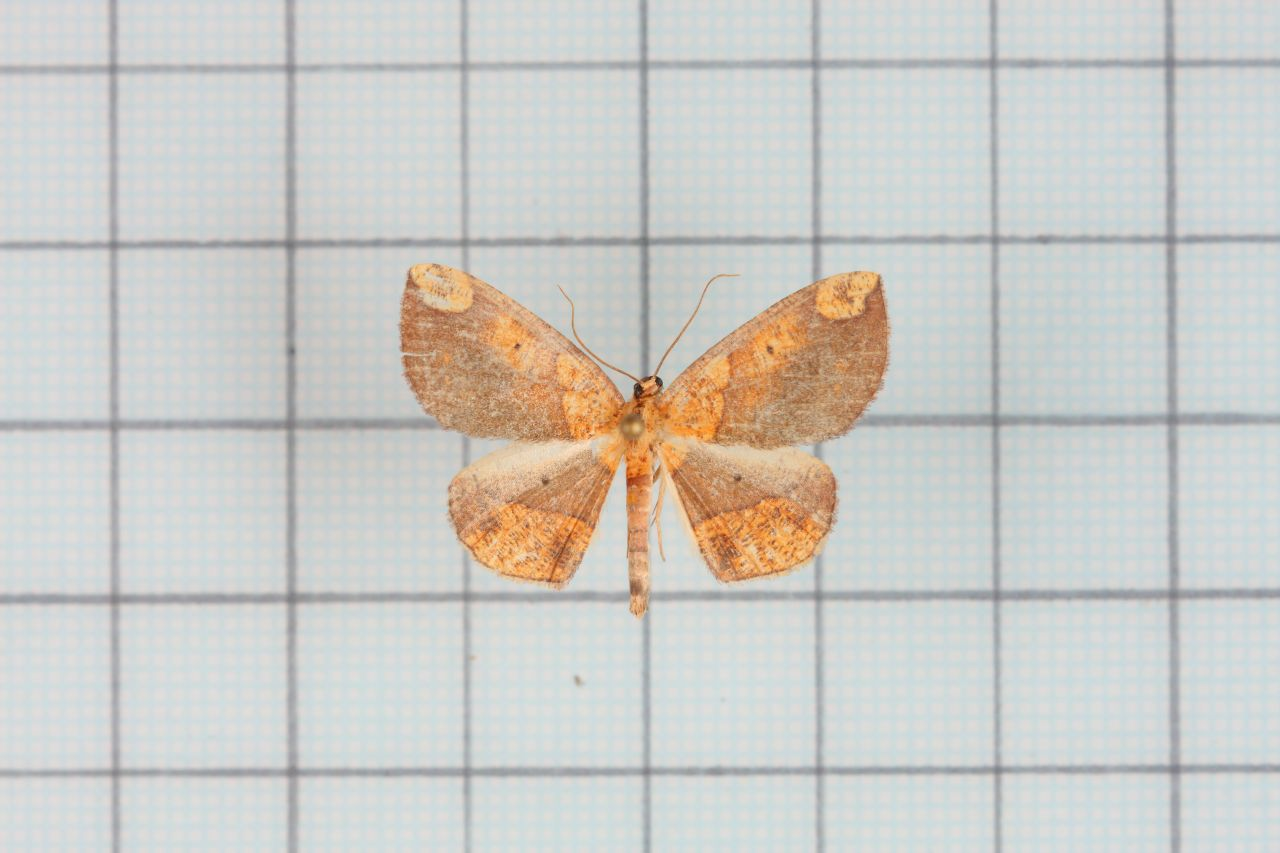
- Crypsicometa ochracea

Scientific classification
- Kingdom: Animalia
- Phylum: Arthropoda
- Clade: Pancrustacea
- Class: Insecta
- Order: Lepidoptera
- Family: Geometridae
- Tribe: Baptini
- Genus: Crypsicometa; Warren, 1894

= Crypsicometa =

Genus of moths

Crypsicometa is a genus of moths in the family Geometridae.

== Species ==
- Crypsicometa homoema Prout, 1926
- Crypsicometa incertaria (Leech, 1891)
- Crypsicometa ochracea Inoue, 1971
