= Rhynchobapta =

Scientific classification
- Kingdom: Animalia
- Phylum: Arthropoda
- Clade: Pancrustacea
- Class: Insecta
- Order: Lepidoptera
- Family: Geometridae
- Tribe: Baptini
- Genus: Rhynchobapta; Hampson, 1895

Synonyms
- Phanauta Warren, 1896

Genus of moths

Rhynchobapta is a genus of moths in the family Geometridae erected by George Hampson in 1895.

== Species ==
- Rhynchobapta cervinaria (Moore, 1888) India
- Rhynchobapta irrorata Hampson, 1902 southern India
- Rhynchobapta eburnivena (Warren, 1896) north-eastern Himalayas, Japan, Borneo, Sumatra, Sulawesi
