= Hypoplectis =

Scientific classification
- Kingdom: Animalia
- Phylum: Arthropoda
- Clade: Pancrustacea
- Class: Insecta
- Order: Lepidoptera
- Family: Geometridae
- Tribe: Baptini
- Genus: Hypoplectis; Hübner, 1823
- Species: H. pertextaria

Binomial name
- Hypoplectis pertextaria Hübner, 1823

Synonyms
- Angeronopsis Warren, 1894

Genus of moths

Hypoplectis is a monotypic moth genus in the family Geometridae. Its only species, Hypoplectis pertextaria, is found in Suriname. Both the genus and species were first described by Jacob Hübner in 1823.
