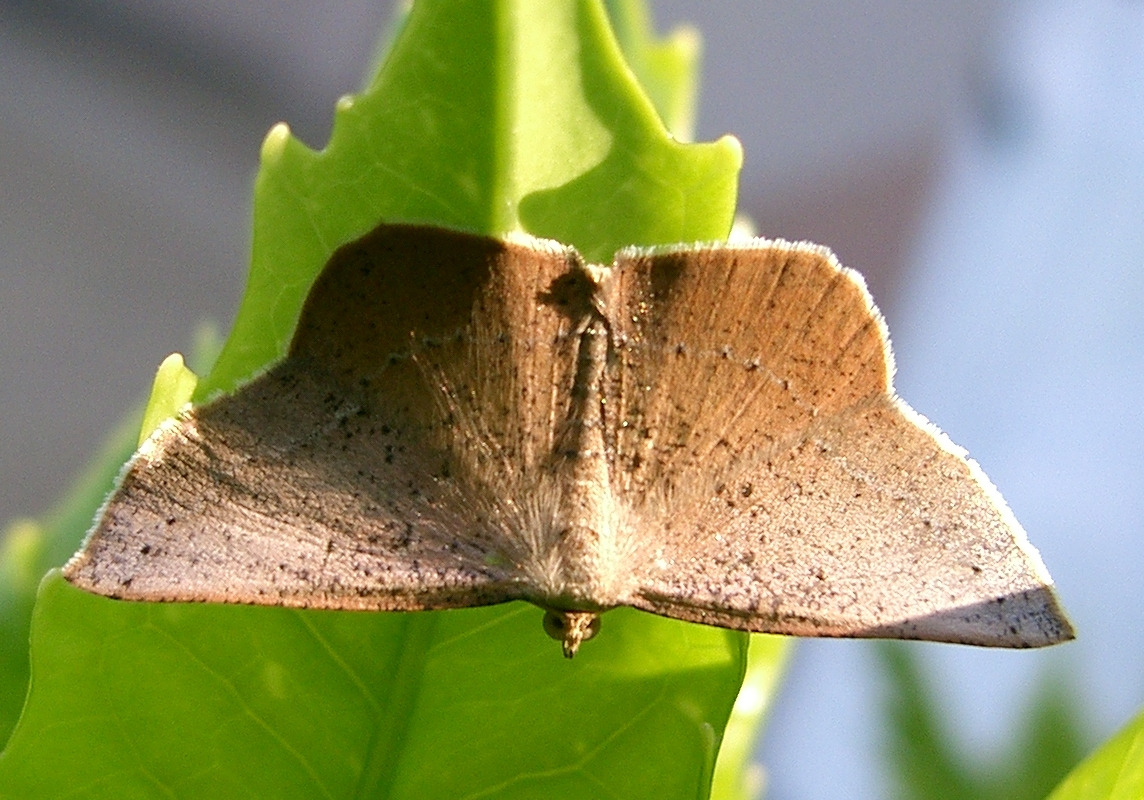
- Plesiomorpha punctilinearia

Scientific classification
- Domain: Eukaryota
- Kingdom: Animalia
- Phylum: Arthropoda
- Class: Insecta
- Order: Lepidoptera
- Family: Geometridae
- Tribe: Baptini
- Genus: Plesiomorpha; Warren, 1898

= Plesiomorpha =

Genus of moths

Plesiomorpha is a moth genus in the family Geometridae described by Warren in 1898.

== Species ==
- Plesiomorpha punctilinearia (Leech, 1891)
- Plesiomorpha vulpecula Warren, 1898
- Plesiomorpha flaviceps Butler, 1881
