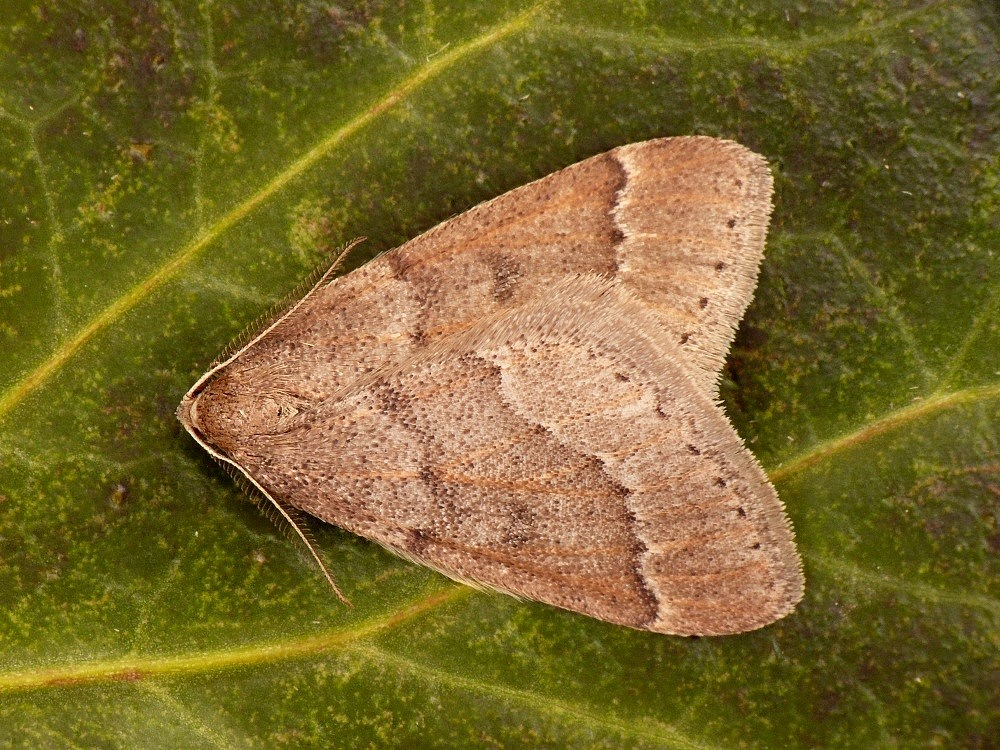
- Male

Scientific classification
- Domain: Eukaryota
- Kingdom: Animalia
- Phylum: Arthropoda
- Class: Insecta
- Order: Lepidoptera
- Family: Geometridae
- Genus: Theria
- Species: T. rupicapraria

Binomial name
- Theria rupicapraria (Denis & Schiffermüller, 1775)

Synonyms
- Geometra rupicapraria Denis & Schiffermuller, 1775; Theria culminaria Leraut, 1993

= Theria rupicapraria =

Species of moth

Theria rupicapraria is a moth of the family Geometridae. It is found throughout in Europe and the South Caucasus.

The wingspan is 28–30 mm for males. Females have reduced wings. Adults are on wing from January to April. There is one generation per year.

The larvae feed on Crataegus and Prunus spinosa. Larvae can be found in June. It overwinters as a pupa.

== Subspecies ==
- Theria rupicapraria rupicapraria
- Theria rupicapraria culminaria Leraut, 1993
