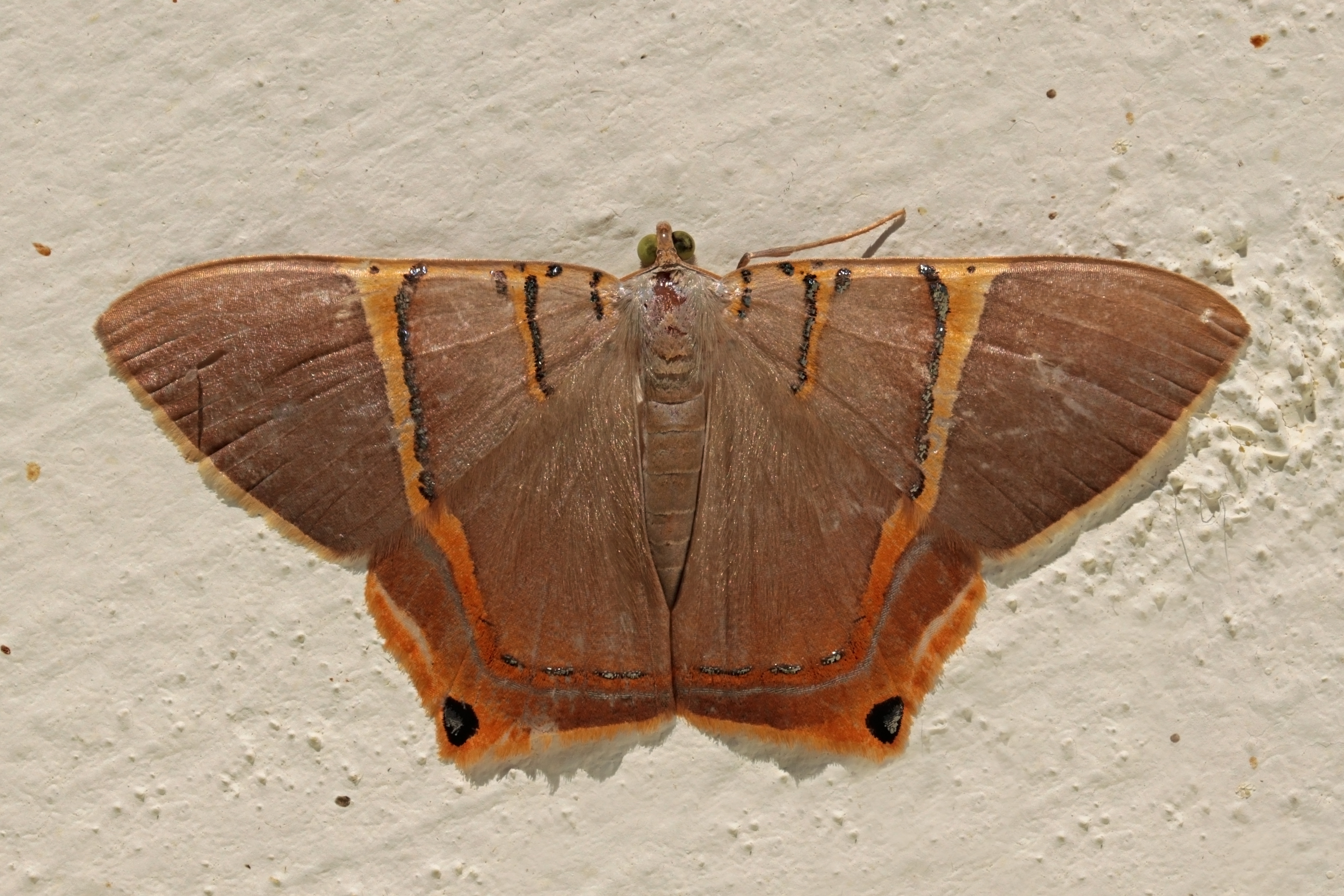
- P. polita Mount Totumas cloud forest, Panama

Scientific classification
- Kingdom: Animalia
- Phylum: Arthropoda
- Clade: Pancrustacea
- Class: Insecta
- Order: Lepidoptera
- Family: Geometridae
- Subfamily: Ennominae
- Tribe: Palyadini
- Genus: Phrygionis; Hübner, [1825] 1816

= Phrygionis =

Genus of moths

Phrygionis is a neotropical moth genus in the family Geometridae.

Phrygionis have relatively conspicuous wing patterns, which probably led to overestimation of their species richness in the past. In most species, the forewing measures 16–18 mm (0.63–0.71 in) in length.

== Species ==
- Phrygionis argentata (Drury, 1773)
- Phrygionis auriferaria Hulst, 1887
- Phrygionis bicornis Scoble, 1994
- Phrygionis cruorata Warren, 1905
- Phrygionis ferreus Scoble, 1994
- Phrygionis flavilimes Warren 1907
- Phrygionis incolorata Prout, 1910
- Phrygionis ochrilineis Scoble, 1994
- Phrygionis paradoxata (Guenée, 1858)
- Phrygionis platinata (Guenee, 1857)
- Phrygionis polita (Cramer, 1780)
- Phrygionis privignaria (Guenee 1857)
- Phrygionis rawlinsi Scoble, 1994
- Phrygionis sumptuosaria (Moschler, 1886)
