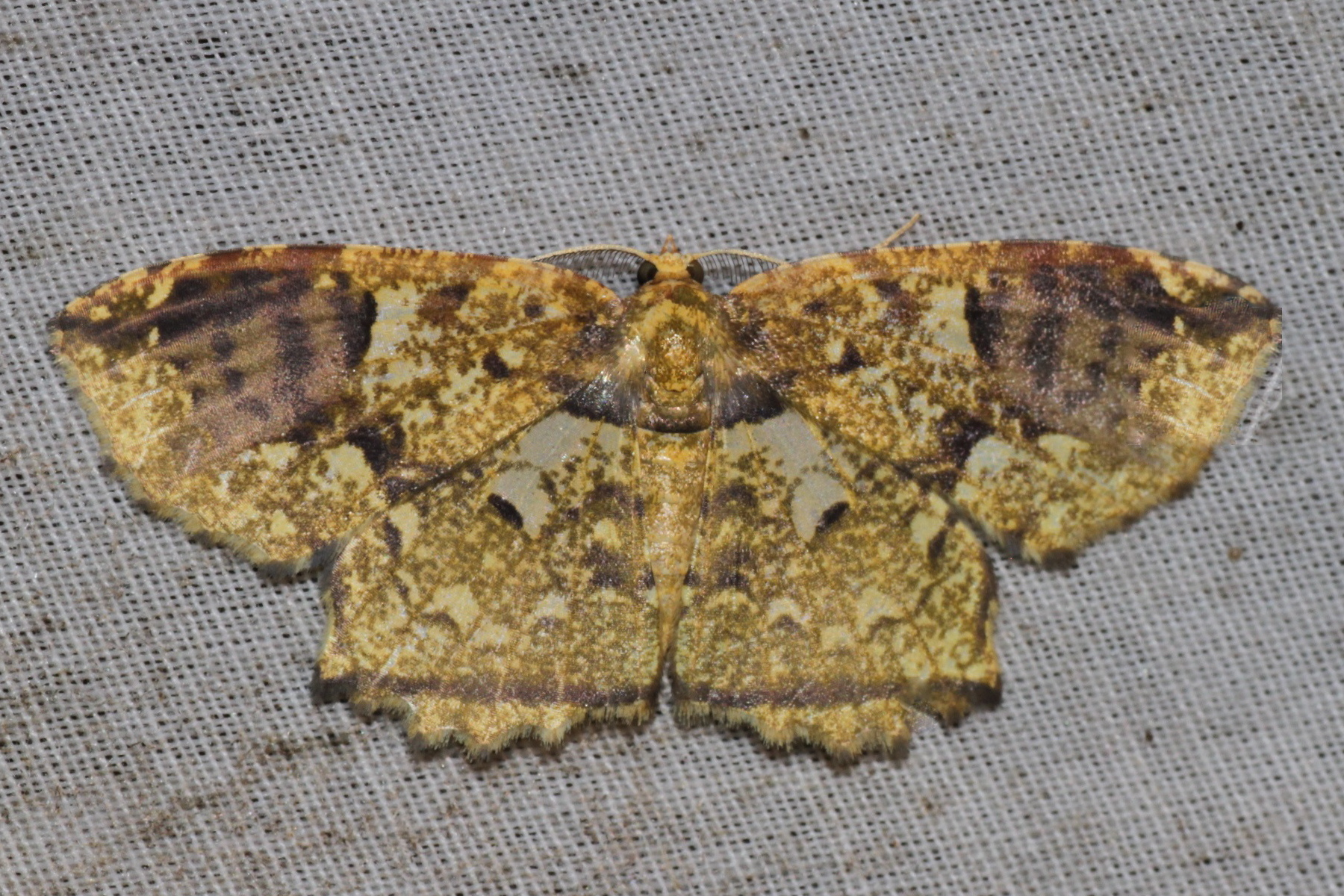
- Synegia orsinephes from Borneo

Scientific classification
- Kingdom: Animalia
- Phylum: Arthropoda
- Class: Insecta
- Order: Lepidoptera
- Family: Geometridae
- Subfamily: Ennominae
- Genus: Synegia; Guenée, 1857

Synonyms
- Eugnesia; Syntaracta

= Synegia =

Genus of moths

Synegia is a genus of moths in the family Geometridae. It was described by Achille Guenée in 1857.

== Description ==
Palpi obliquely porrect (extending forward), roughly scaled and reaching beyond the frons. Hind tibia not dilated. Forewings with vein 3 from near angle of cell. Vein 7, 8 and 9 stalked from near upper angle. Veins 10 and 11 stalked, connected or anastomosing (fusing) with vein 12, and vein 10 connected or anastomosing with veins 8 and 9.

Most species in the genus have pale yellow or brownish wings banded and speckled with reddish gray. Many species have the fasciae marked by black dots. The similar dots also occur at the disc and margins of most species, though the type species (Synegia botydaria (Guenée, 1858)) has no black markings at all. Some have more extensive black or brownish-gray clouding, and this can vary within a species. The body is delicate, legs and abdomen in males often elongate. The male antennae can be filiform (thread-like) or bipectinate (feather-like).

== Species ==
The following is an incomplete list of some species

- Synegia aemula Warren, 1894
- Synegia albibasis Warren, 1906
- Synegia angusta Prout, 1924
- Synegia asymbates Prout, 1932
- Synegia atriplena Warren, 1906
- Synegia botydaria Guenée, 1858
- Synegia camptogrammaria Guenée, 1858
- Synegia clathrata Warren, 1906
- Synegia commaculata Warren, 1907
- Synegia conflagrata Hampson, 1912
- Synegia cumulata Warren, 1907
- Synegia decolorata Warren, 1903
- Synegia divergens Wehrli, 1939
- Synegia echmatica Prout, 1929
- Synegia erythra Hampson, 1891
- Synegia esther Butler, 1881
- Synegia eumeleata Walker, 1861
- Synegia fasciata Warren, 1906
- Synegia frenaria Swinhoe, 1902
- Synegia fulvata Warren, 1906
- Synegia hadassa Butler, 1878
- Synegia hormosticta Prout, 1925
- Synegia ichinosawana Matsumura, 1925
- Synegia imitaria Walker, 1861
- Synegia incepta Warren, 1907
- Synegia inconspicua Butler, 1881
- Synegia limitata Warren, 1897
- Synegia limitatoides Inoue, 1982
- Synegia lineata Swinhoe, 1902
- Synegia luteolata Snellen, 1880
- Synegia maculosata Warren, 1896
- Synegia malayana Prout, 1925
- Synegia medionubis Prout, 1925
- Synegia medioxima Prout, 1928
- Synegia melanospila Warren, 1907
- Synegia minima Wehrli
- Synegia neglecta Inoue, 1954
- Synegia nephelotis Prout, 1929
- Synegia nigrellata Warren, 1906
- Synegia nigritibiata West, 1929
- Synegia obliquifasciatav Wehrli, 1986
- Synegia obrimaria Walker, 1861
- Synegia obscura Warren, 1894
- Synegia ocellata Warren, 1894
- Synegia omissa Warren, 1894
- Synegia orsinephes Prout, 1928
- Synegia pallens Inoue, 1982
- Synegia phaiotaeniata Wehrli, 1936
- Synegia plumbea Warren, 1906
- Synegia polynesia Prout, 1916
- Synegia potenza Holloway, 1976
- Synegia prospera Prout, 1929
- Synegia punctinervis Holloway, 1976
- Synegia purpurascens Warren, 1894
- Synegia rosearia Leech, 1897
- Synegia saturata West, 1929
- Synegia scutigera Warren, 1906
- Synegia secunda Swinhoe, 1909
- Synegia semifascia Warren, 1906
- Synegia semipectinata Prout, 1916
- Synegia sericearia Walker, 1866
- Synegia similis West, 1929
- Synegia subomissa Wehrli, 1939
- Synegia suffusa Prout, 1915
- Synegia tephrospila Warren, 1906
- Synegia tertia West, 1929
- Synegia transgrisea Holloway, 1976
- Synegia unicolor Wileman, 1911
- Synegia uniformis Inoue, 1954
- Synegia varians Warren, 1894
- Synegia wehrlii Bryk, 1942
