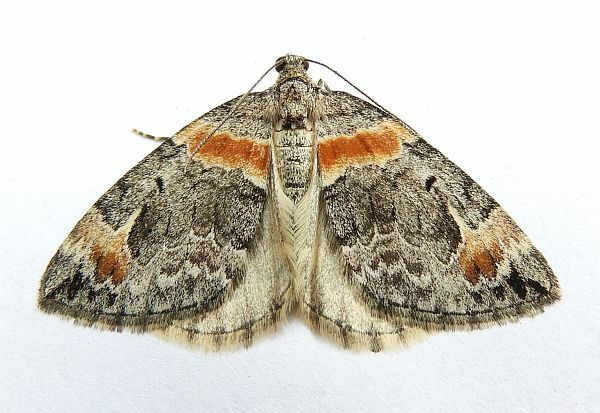

Scientific classification
- Kingdom: Animalia
- Phylum: Arthropoda
- Clade: Pancrustacea
- Class: Insecta
- Order: Lepidoptera
- Family: Geometridae
- Tribe: Cidariini
- Genus: Dysstroma
- Species: D. hersiliata

Binomial name
- Dysstroma hersiliata (Guenée in Boisduval & Guenée, 1858)

= Dysstroma hersiliata =

Species of moth

Dysstroma hersiliata, the Orange-barred carpet moth, is a species of geometrid moth in the family Geometridae. It is found in North America. Adults fly in June to August.

== Subspecies ==
These two subspecies belong to the species Dysstroma hersiliata:

- Dysstroma hersiliata cervinifascia (Walker, 1862)
- Dysstroma hersiliata hersiliata (Guenée in Boisduval & Guenée, 1858)

== Description ==
In adults, Dysstroma hersiliata is mostly gray with black and white pattering across the wings that varies between individuals. Its most distinctive feature is a solid orange bar going across the upper-middle portion of the wing. It has a pale discal spot on its hindwing. It has a very short palpi. The wingspan is 25-29mm.

Dysstroma hersiliata caterpillars are lime green with two off-white stripes near its back end. Mature larvae are around 2 cm. The cocoon is open and net-like with the pupa visible within.

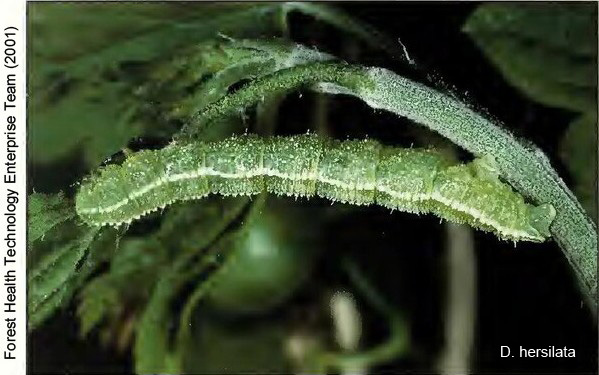
Dysstroma hersiliata caterpillar

== Similar Species ==
- Dark-barred Twin-spot Carpet (Xanthorhoe ferrugata)
- 10-Spotted Rhododendron Moth (Dysstroma sobria)
- Marbled Carpet Moth (Dysstroma truncata)

== Distribution ==
Dysstroma hersiliata It has a broad range across North America, including Alaska, southern Canada and most of United States except the most southern states, although it is more common in the eastern half of its range.

== External links and photos ==
- BugGuide
- Moth Photography Group
- iNaturalist
