= Marbled carpet moth =

Marbled carpet moth may refer to:

- Dysstroma truncata
- Dysstroma walkerata
