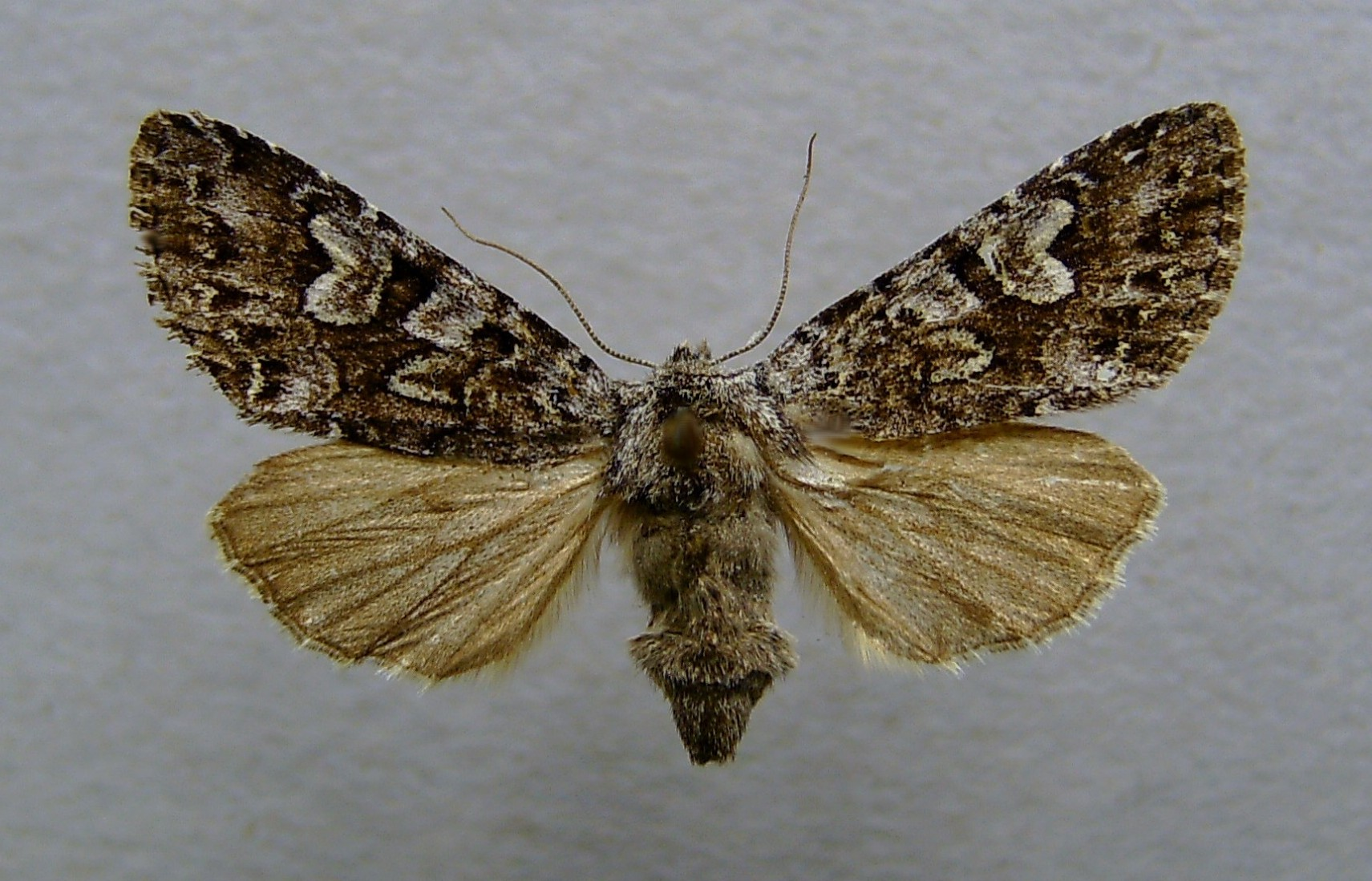

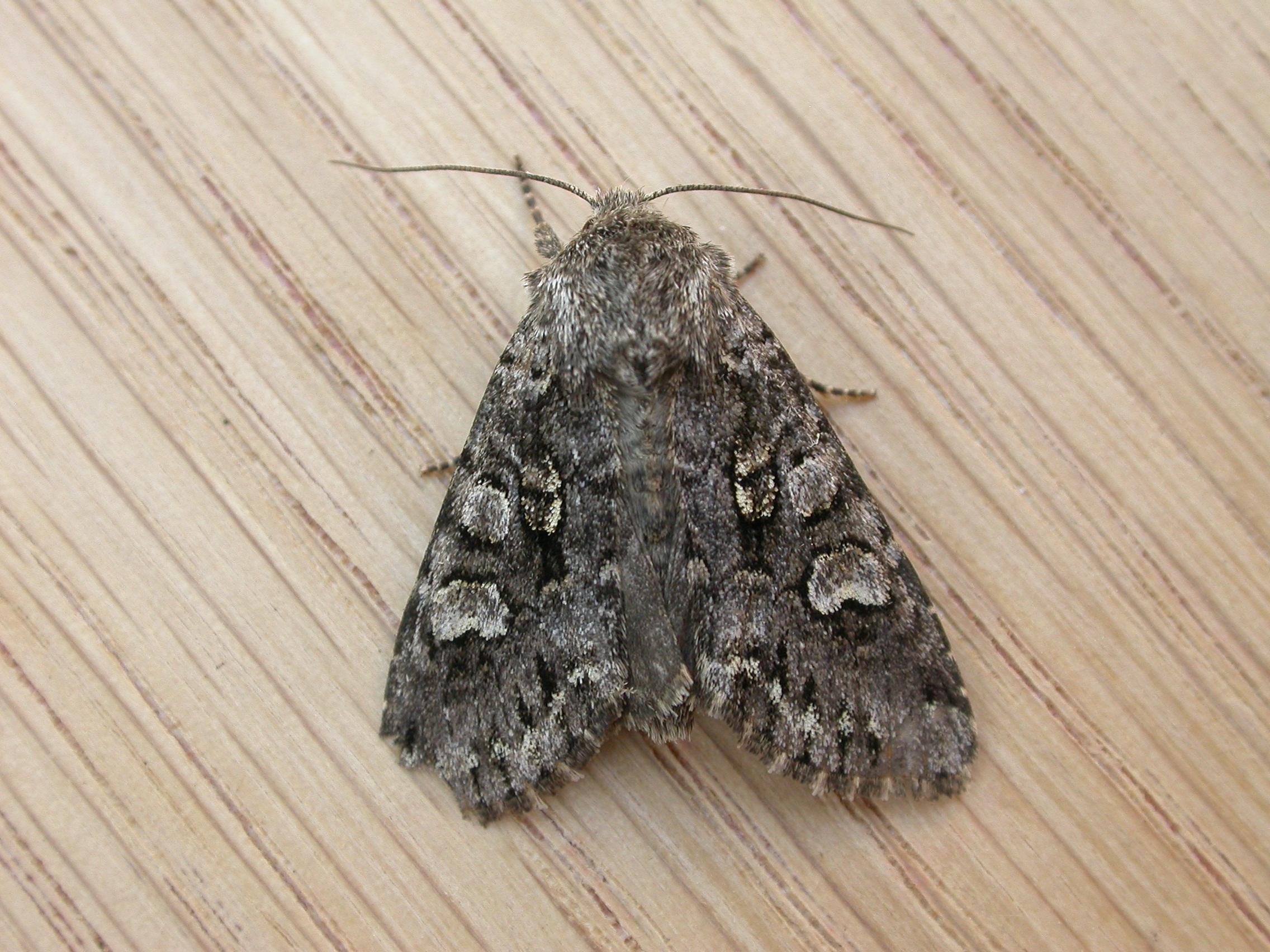

Scientific classification
- Domain: Eukaryota
- Kingdom: Animalia
- Phylum: Arthropoda
- Class: Insecta
- Order: Lepidoptera
- Superfamily: Noctuoidea
- Family: Noctuidae
- Genus: Papestra
- Species: P. biren

Binomial name
- Papestra biren (Goeze, 1781)

Synonyms
- Hadena poliostigma; Hadena quadriposita; Noctua aperta; Noctua glauca; Noctua lappo; Mamestra bi-ren; Mamestra biren; Mamestra glauca; Mamestra glauca var. taunensis; Mamestra glauca var. paupercula; Phalaena biren; Polia frustrata; Polia glauca

= Papestra biren =

Glaucous shears

Species of moth

Papestra biren, the glaucous shears, is a moth of the family Noctuidae. The species was first described by Johann August Ephraim Goeze in 1781. It is found in most of Europe, but not in the southern parts of the Iberian Peninsula, Italy and Greece. Outside of Europe it is found in Kashmir and through the Palearctic to Siberia, Central Asia, Amur, Kamchatka, the Russian Far East and Japan. It was introduced in Newfoundland in 1935 and has since then extended its range ever more southward within North America partly overlapping with Papestra quadrata (Smith, 1891). It rises to 2200 m above sea level in the Alps.

== Technical description and variation ==
The wingspan is 30–38 mm. Forewing purplish grey suffused with blackish; stigmata pale grey, with whitish rims edged with black; submarginal line whitish, preceded by black dentate marks: hindwing dark brownish fuscous; the paler- or bluish-grey tint is most developed in the type form; lappo Dup. is a more ashy grey form with pale stigmata, from Lapland, Finland, and northern Ireland; aperta Geyer represents an exceptionally dark form; while taunensis Fuchs, from the Taunus Mts., is uniform dark ruddy grey, with only the external margins of the claviform and reniform pale.

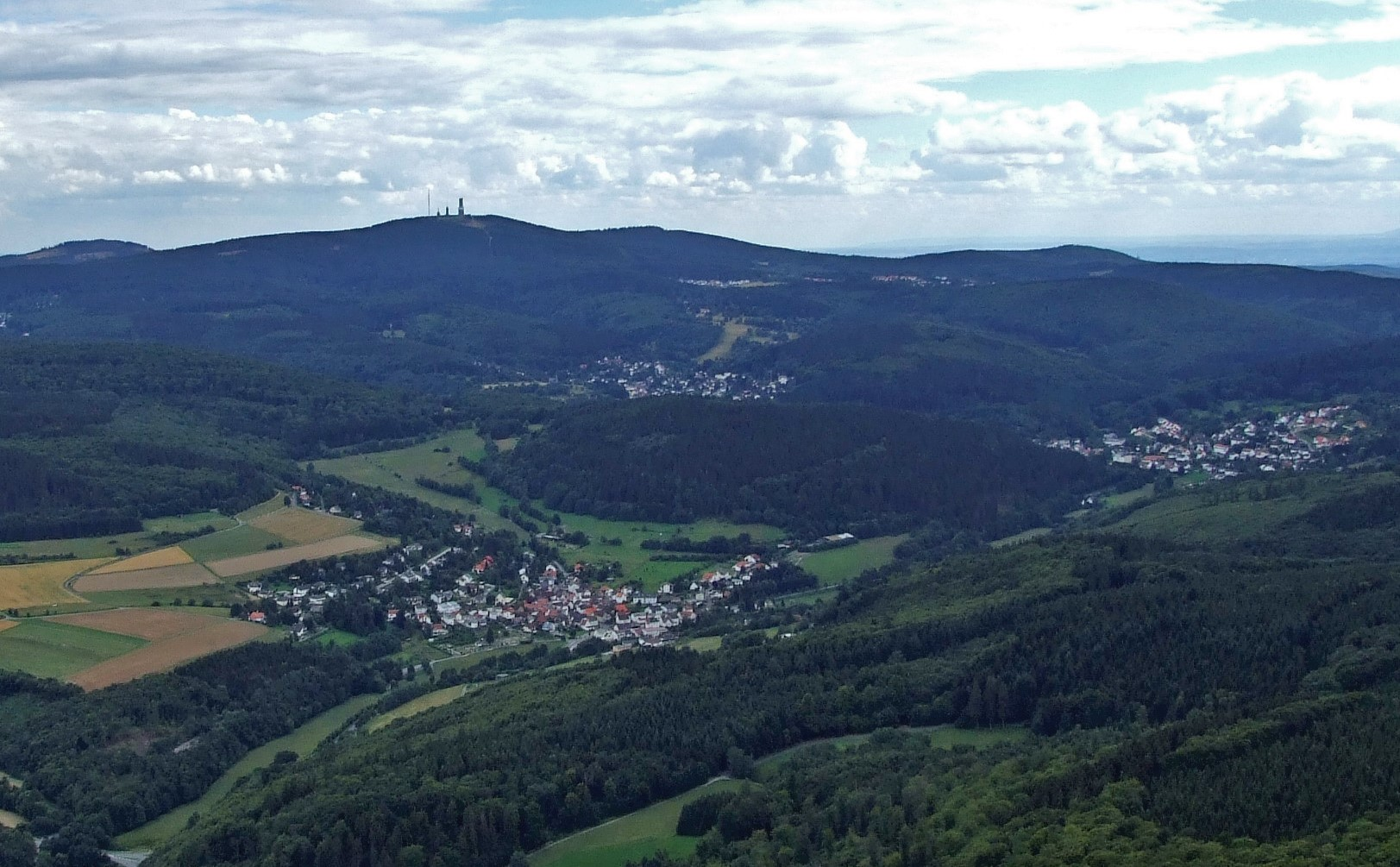
Habitat in the Taunus Mountains, Germany

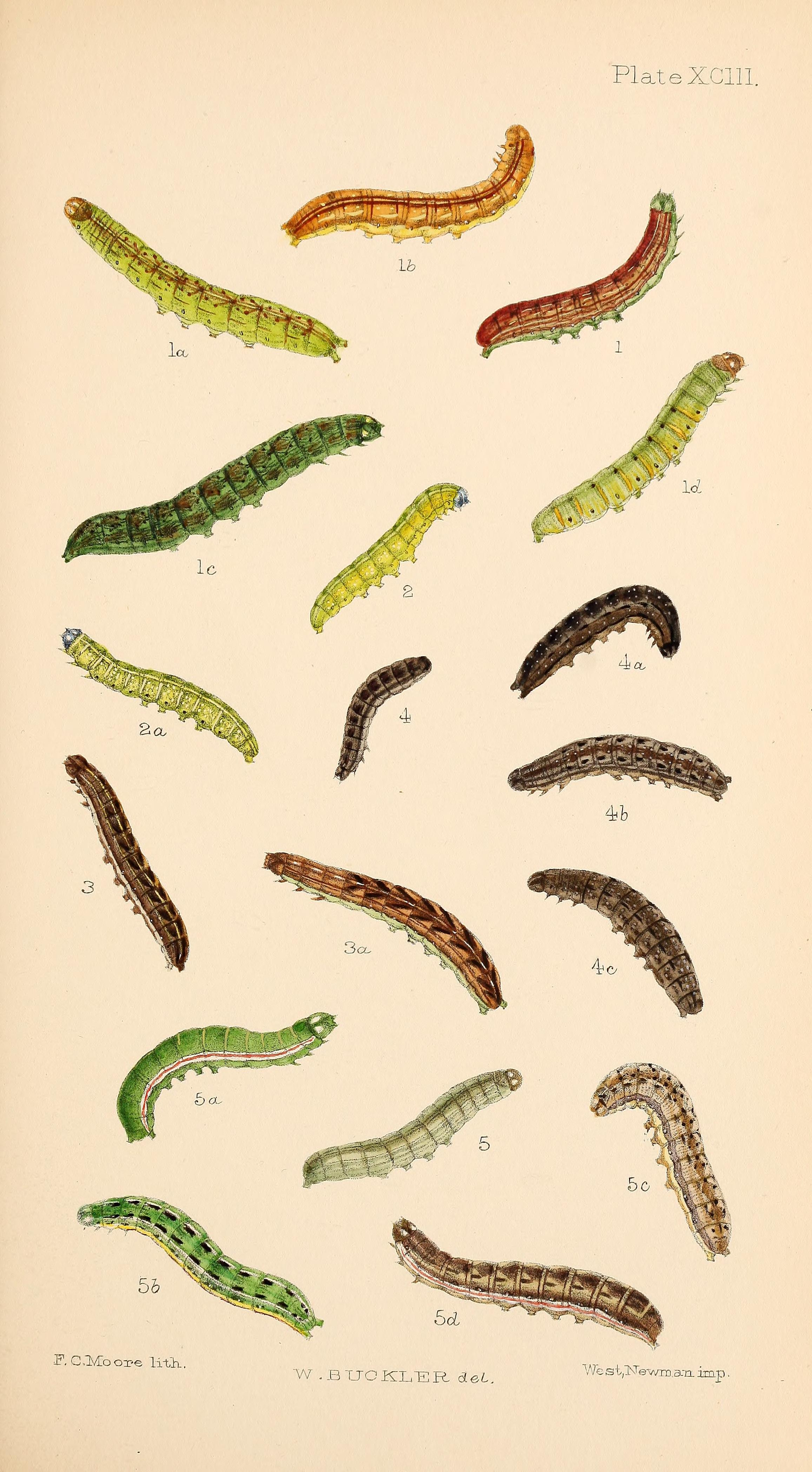
3, 3a larvae in various stages

== Biology ==
Adults are on wing from May to July in one generation.

Larva brownish red, with dark dorsal reticulation: dorsal line distinctly paler; subdorsal lines formed of dark lunules, which on the 11th segment meet in a dark patch, beyond which the 12th is yellowish; lateral lines yellowish white; spiracles white, black-edged.

The larvae mainly feed on low-growing mountain plants Vaccinium uliginosum and Vaccinium myrtillus, but have also been recorded on Salix caprea and Sorbusa ucuparia.
