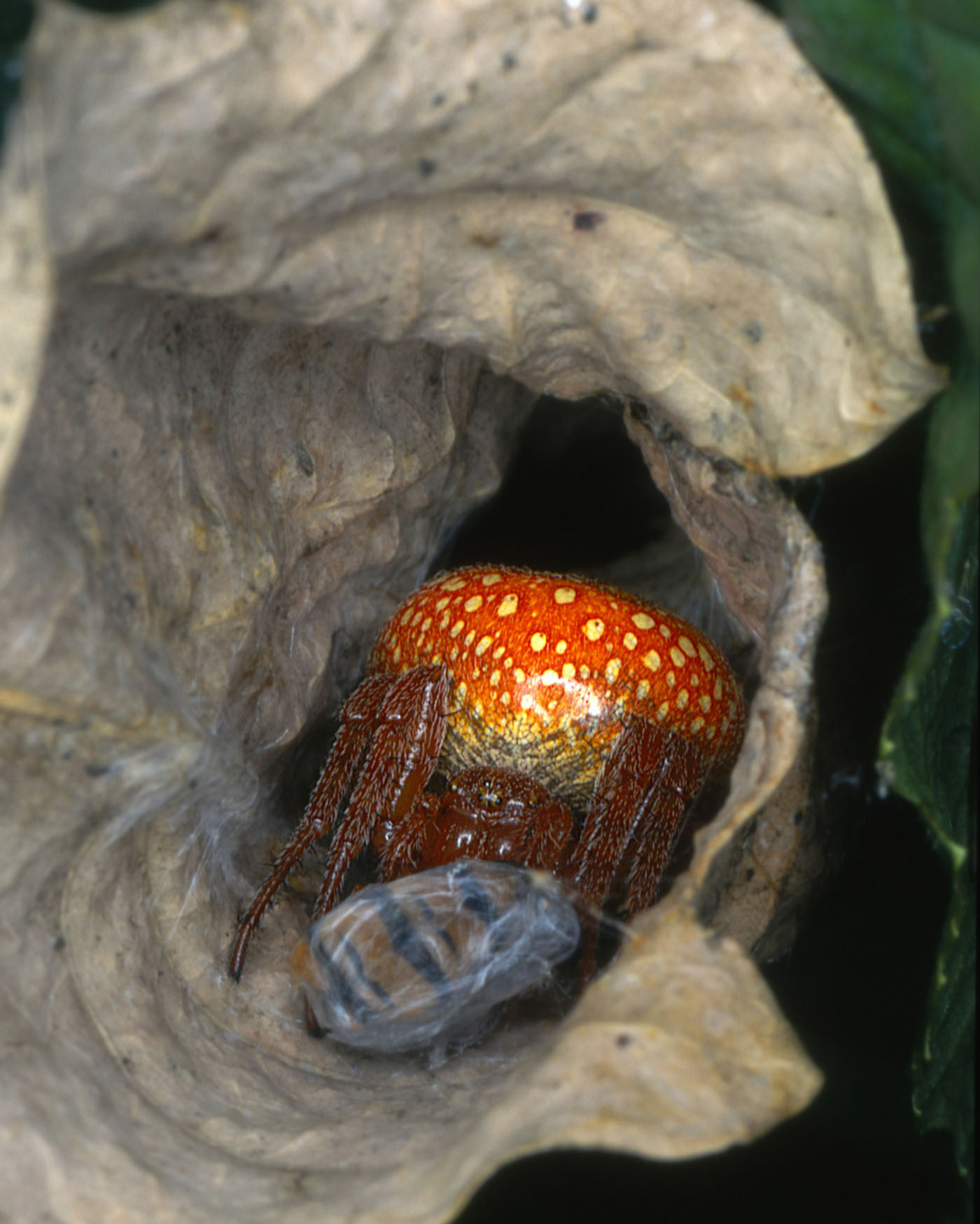
- Araneus alsine in rolled leaf

Scientific classification
- Domain: Eukaryota
- Kingdom: Animalia
- Phylum: Arthropoda
- Subphylum: Chelicerata
- Class: Arachnida
- Order: Araneae
- Infraorder: Araneomorphae
- Family: Araneidae
- Genus: Araneus
- Species: A. alsine

Binomial name
- Araneus alsine (Walckenaer, 1802)

Synonyms
- Aranea alsine Walckenaer, 1802; Epeira alsine (Walckenaer, 1802); Epeira lutea C. L. Koch, 1837

= Araneus alsine =

Species of spider

Araneus alsine, the strawberry spider or orange wheelweaving spider, is a species of the orb-weaving spider family, Araneidae.

== Distribution ==
This species has a palearctic distribution (Europe, Turkey, Caucasus, Russia, Kazakhstan, Japan).

== Habitat ==
These spiders prefer moist environments. They mainly inhabit forests clearings, swampy bogs with birch and heather, wet meadows, high grass and shady places.

== Description ==
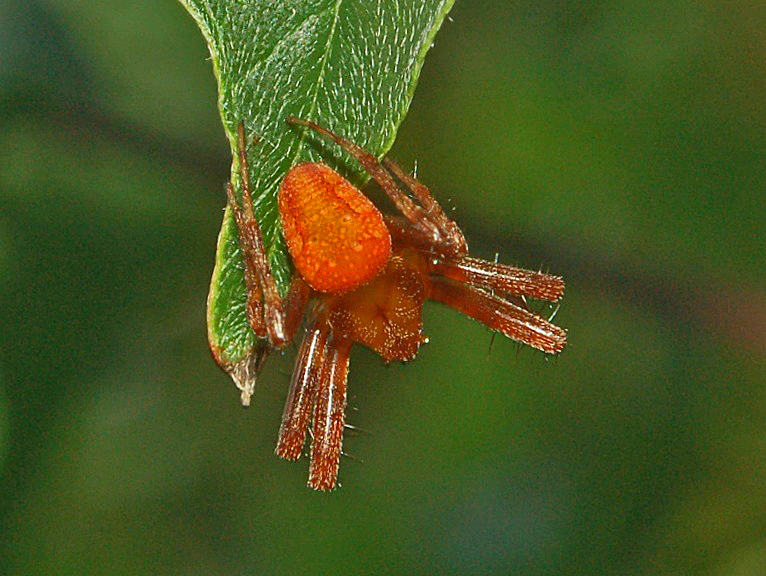
Male of Araneus alsine, dorsal view

Araneus alsine can reach a body length of 6.5–8.5 millimetres (0.26–0.33 in) in males, of 12–14.9 millimetres (0.47–0.59 in) in females. These spiders have a large, almost globular or slightly elliptical shaped opisthosoma, ranging from beige to reddish-orange, with many white-and-yellow spots spread over the surface and sometimes forming the sign of a cross. Sternum, chelicerae and legs are reddish brown. Legs show darker annulations in males. As one of its common names suggests, A. alsine appears somewhat like a strawberry.

== Habits ==
In June and July A. alsine builds small webs (less than 10 or 20 cm high) near the ground and waits near them in dried leaves that it has rolled together, forming an inverted cone. The retreat and web can be found in low vegetation, often near bushes of Vaccinium uliginosum. Mating occurs in June and July, eggs are laid until August. The spiderlings soon hatch, overwinter in a subadult stadium and are full-grown in early summer next year.

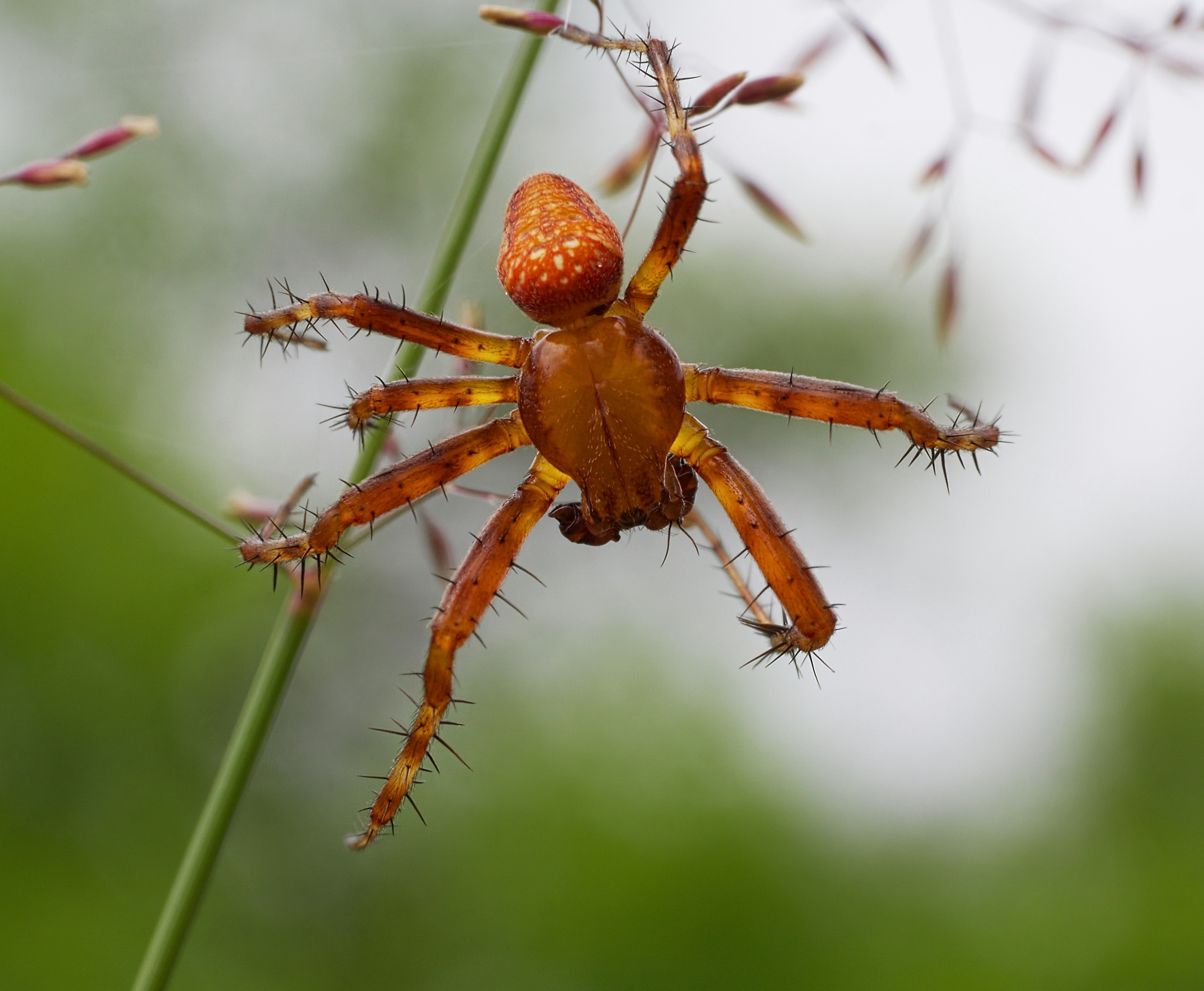
Strawberry Spider - Araneus alsine, male. Taken between Wustrow and Neu Drosedow, Mecklenburg-Western Pomerania, Germany

== Bibliography ==
- Blackwall, J., 1864a - A history of the spiders of Great Britain and Ireland. London, Ray Society, vol.2, pp. 175–384.
- Bösenberg, W., 1901 - Die Spinnen Deutschlands. I. Zoologica (Stuttgart) vol.14(1), pp. 1–96.
- Heiko Bellmann, Guida ai ragni d'Europa, Roma, Franco Muzzio Editore, 2011, pp. 138–139, ISBN 9788874132393.
- Heimer, S. & W. Nentwig, 1991 - Spinnen Mitteleuropas: Ein Bestimmungsbuch. Verlag Paul Parey, Berlin, 543 pp.
- Locket, G.H. & A.F. Millidge, 1953 - British spiders. Ray Society, London, vol.2, pp. 1–449.
- Sestáková, A., M. Krumpál & Z. Krumpálová, 2009 - Araneidae (Araneae) Strednej Európy: I. Rod Araneus. Bratislava, Prírodovedecká Fakulta Univerzity Komenskéhó, 151 pp.
- Simon, E., 1929 - Les arachnides de France. Synopsis générale et catalogue des espèces françaises de l'ordre des Araneae; 3e partie. Paris, vol.6, pp. 533–772.
- Walckenaer, C.A., 1802 - Faune parisienne. Insectes. ou Histoire abrégée des insectes de environs de Paris. Paris vol.2, pp. 187–250.
