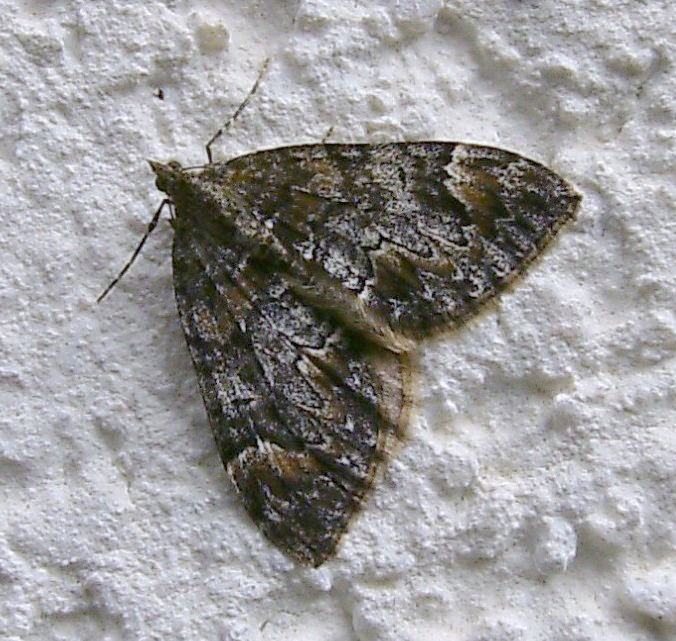

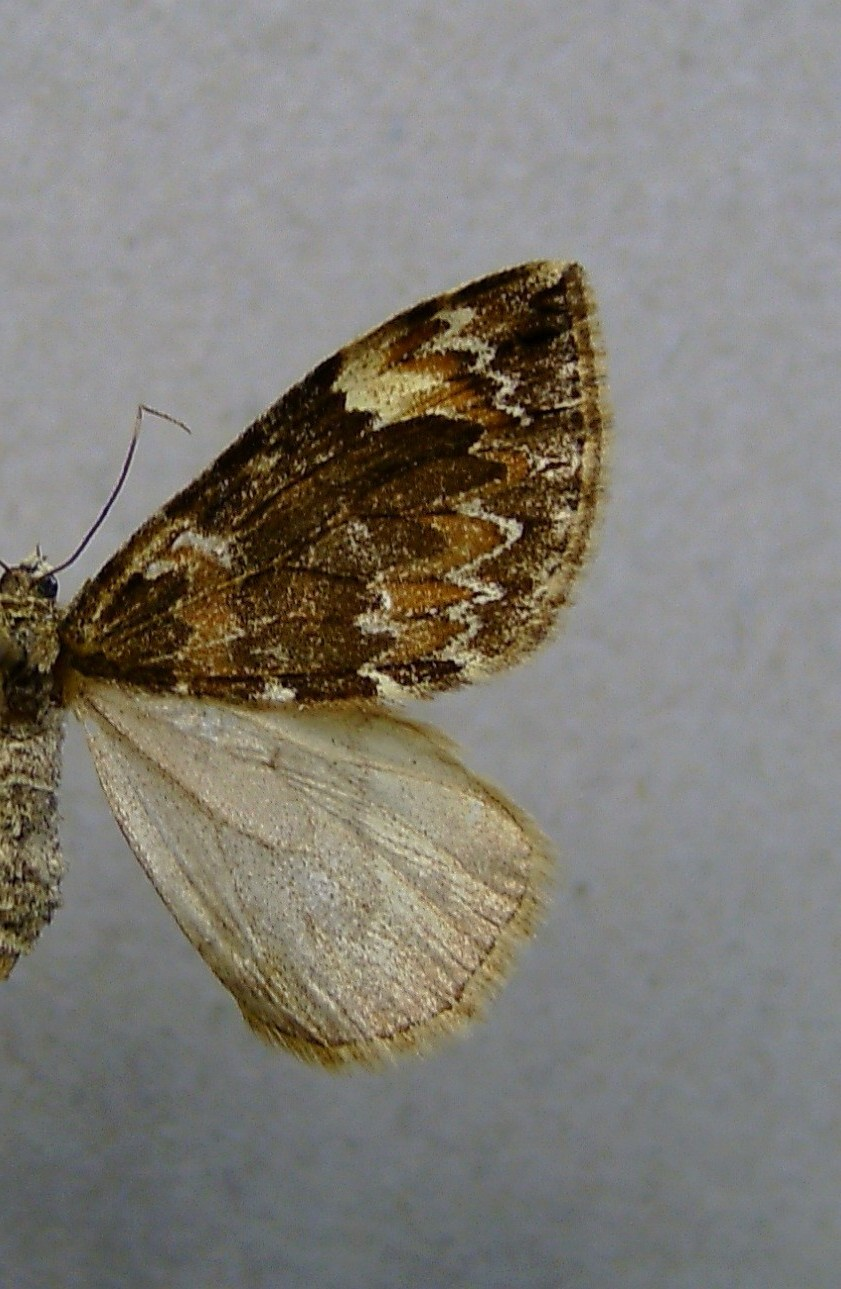

Scientific classification
- Kingdom: Animalia
- Phylum: Arthropoda
- Clade: Pancrustacea
- Class: Insecta
- Order: Lepidoptera
- Family: Geometridae
- Genus: Dysstroma
- Species: D. citrata

Binomial name
- Dysstroma citrata (Linnaeus, 1761)

Synonyms
- List: Phalaena citrata Linnaeus, 1761; Dysstroma citratum; Chloroclysta citrata (Linnaeus, 1761); Dysstroma marmorata (Fabricius, 1794); Dysstroma immanata (Haworth, 1809); Dysstroma omicronata (Donovan, 1811); Dysstroma immanaria (Doubleday, 1849); Dysstroma mulleolata (Hulst, 1898); Dysstroma longula (Hulst, 1898)

= Dysstroma citrata =

Species of moth

Dysstroma citrata, the dark marbled carpet or northern marbled carpet, is a moth of the family Geometridae. The species was first described by Carl Linnaeus in 1761. It is found across the Holarctic ecozone and has been reported from India.

The wingspan is 25–32 mm. The ground colour of the forewings may show whitish, grey, black or brown tints but the colour is extremely variable and there are strongly darkened forms.

Prout describes some aberrations.

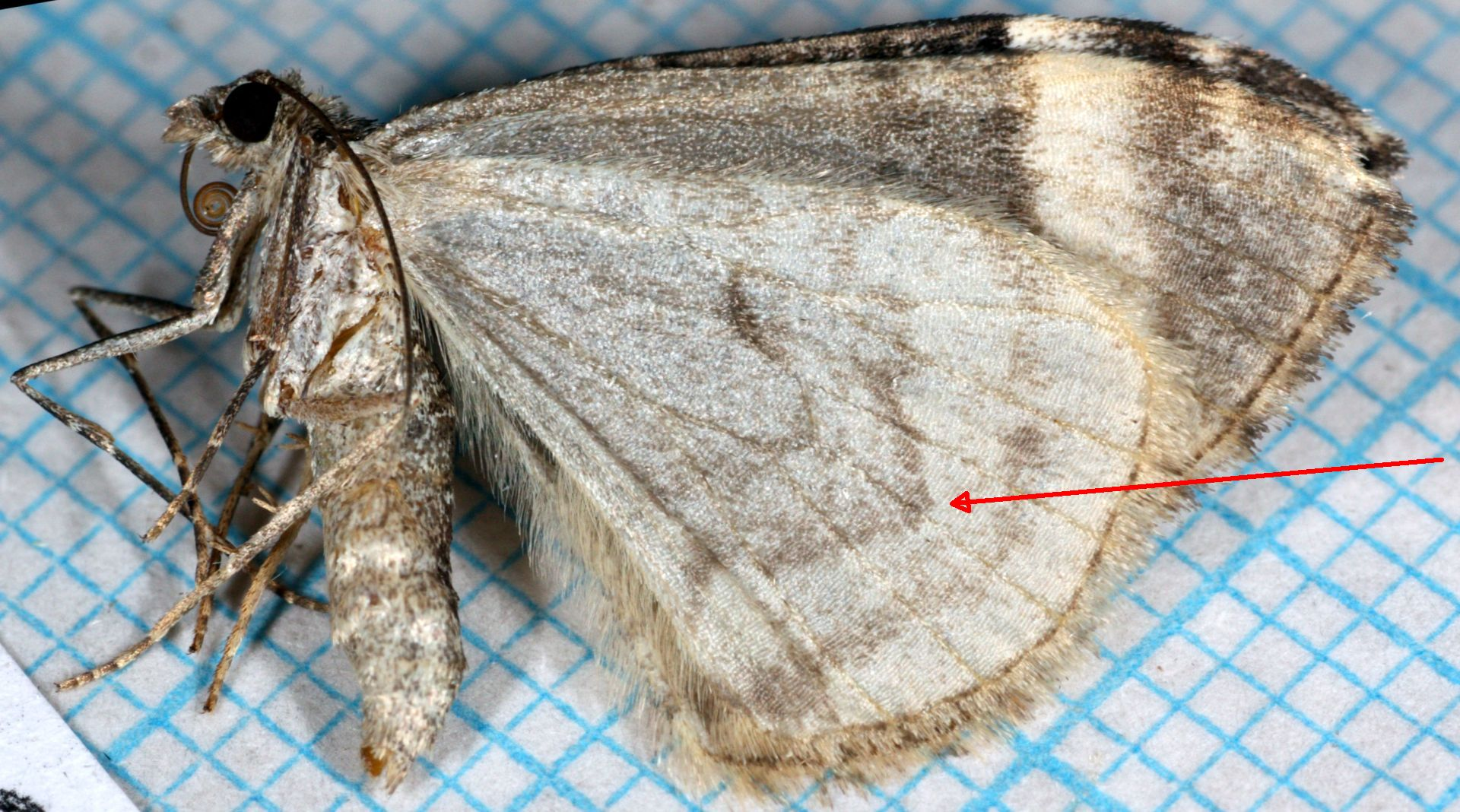

Characteristic is the protruding post medial line on the front wings, which usually reaches the post discal wavy line or interrupts it. Very similar to Dysstroma truncata.

Adult larvae are light green with two white dorsal lines. They have an approximately cylindrical shape as well as a blunt anus flap. The pupa is of green with whitish wing sheaths and has a brown, blunt rounded cremaster.

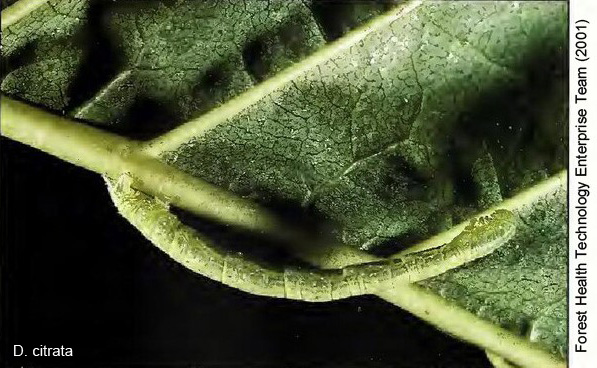
Dysstroma citrata caterpillar

Adults are on wing from July to August.

It is found from Europe through the temperate zone of Asia through northwest China, Mongolia to the Russian Far East and Japan. It is absent in Portugal, on the Mediterranean islands and Greece. In the north, it occurs in Scandinavia up to Lapland and Iceland and the Faroe Islands. In North America it is found from Alaska and Newfoundland to New England and California. It is also reported in India.

It has been found at a height of about 2,400 metres in the Alps. It prefers mountainous areas, wetlands, mountain forests and bushy slopes.

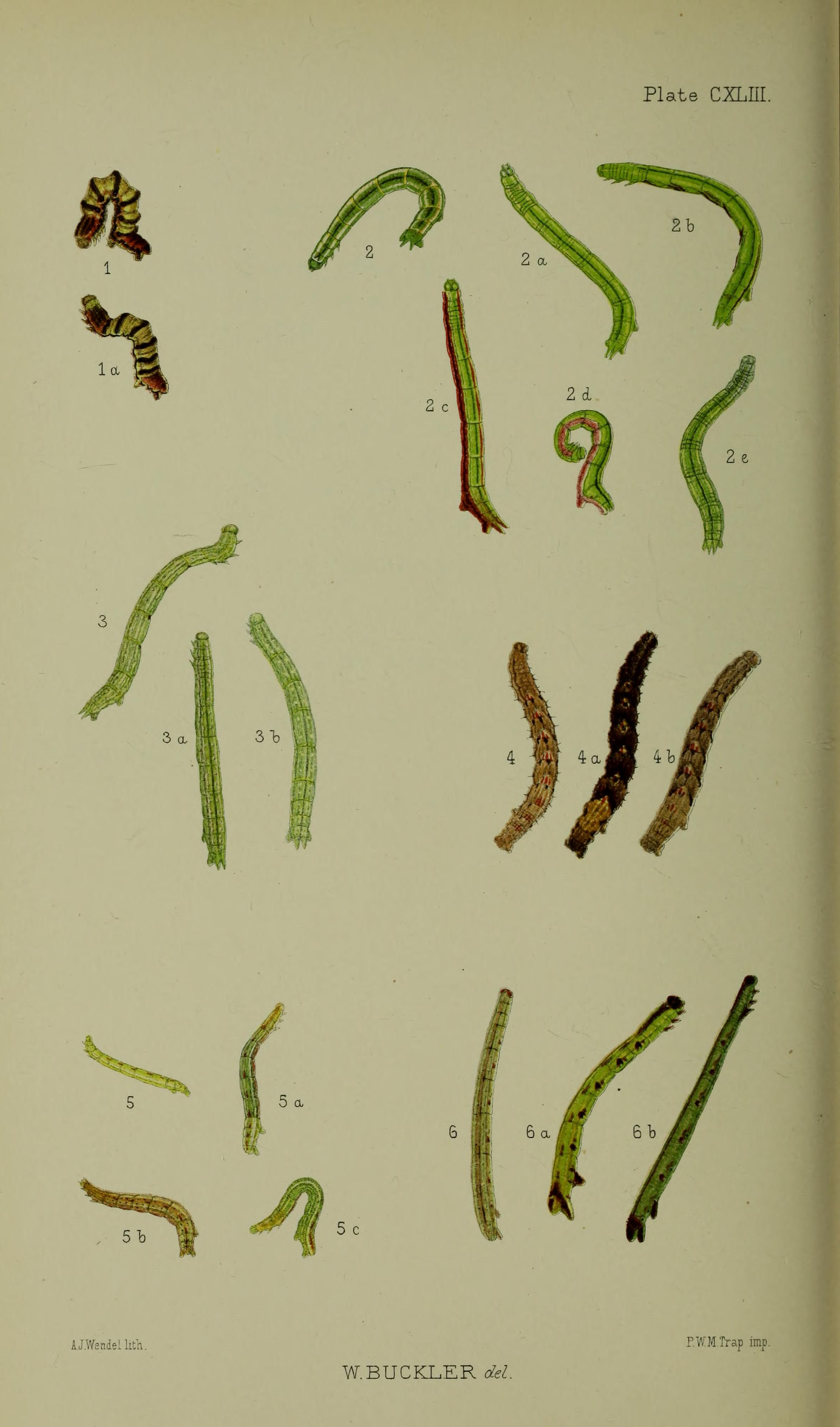
Figs.3, 3a, 3b larvae after final moult 3 from var marmorata

The larvae feed on various shrubs and herbaceous plants, including Vaccinium species such as V. myrtillus and V. uliginosum as well as Aster tripolium, Alnus and Salix.

== Subspecies ==
- Dysstroma citrata citrata
- Dysstroma citrata katshadalarium Beljaev & Vasilenko, 2002 (Magadan, Kamchatka, Komandor Island, northern Kurils)
- Dysstroma citrata nyiwonis (Matsumura, 1925)
- Dysstroma citrata glacialis (Hulst, 1898)
