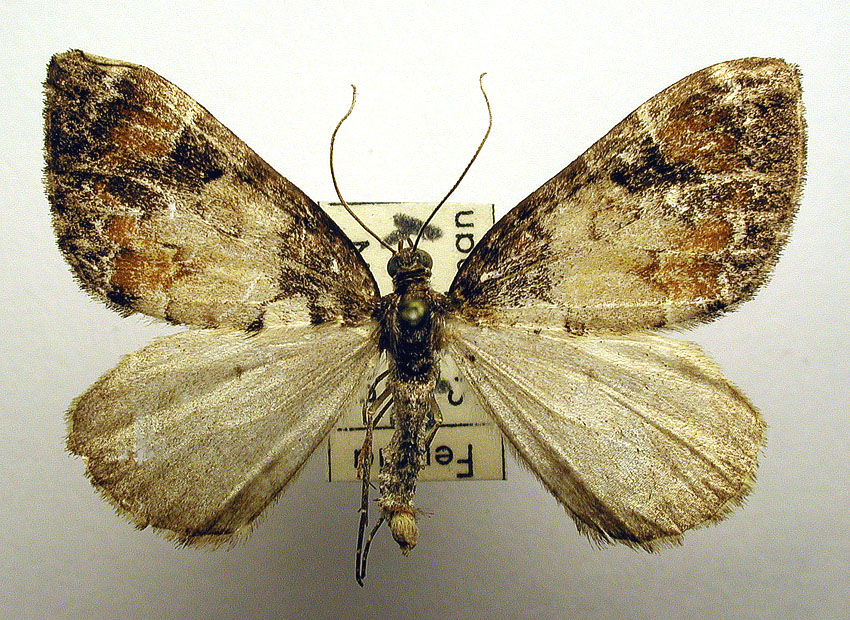

Scientific classification
- Domain: Eukaryota
- Kingdom: Animalia
- Phylum: Arthropoda
- Class: Insecta
- Order: Lepidoptera
- Family: Geometridae
- Genus: Dysstroma
- Species: D. latefasciata

Binomial name
- Dysstroma latefasciata (Blocker, 1908)

Synonyms
- Chloroclysta latefasciata Blocker, 1908; Cidaria latefasciata; Larentia latefasciata

= Dysstroma latefasciata =

Species of moth

Dysstroma latefasciata, the Siberian carpet, is a moth of the family Geometridae. It is found from Fennoscandia to eastern Siberia and Mongolia.

The wingspan is 26–35 mm. Adults are on wing from the end of June to September.

The larvae feed on Vaccinium myrtillus, Vaccinium uliginosum, Rubus chamaemorus, Rhododendron tomentosum and Fragaria vesca. Larvae can be found from August to June. The species overwinters in the larval stage.

== Taxonomy ==
Sources disagree on the authority for this species. While some sources claim the species was described by Staudinger in 1889, others state it was described by Staudinger in 1882, Dahl in 1900 or Blocker in 1908.
