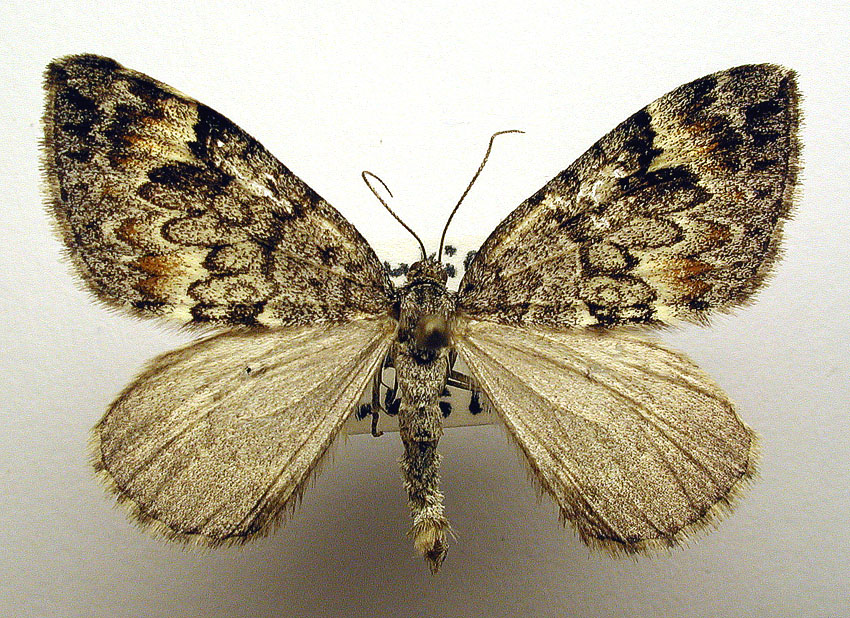

Scientific classification
- Domain: Eukaryota
- Kingdom: Animalia
- Phylum: Arthropoda
- Class: Insecta
- Order: Lepidoptera
- Family: Geometridae
- Genus: Dysstroma
- Species: D. infuscata

Binomial name
- Dysstroma infuscata (Tengström, 1869)

Synonyms
- Chloroclysta infuscata Tengström, 1869; Dysstroma infuscatum; Cidaria infuscata

= Dysstroma infuscata =

Species of moth

Dysstroma infuscata is a moth of the family Geometridae first described by Johan Martin Jakob von Tengström in 1869. It is found from Scandinavia, Poland and the Czech Republic to the Amur River and Sakhalin.

The wingspan is 23–32 mm. Adults are on wing in July.

The larvae feed on Vaccinium myrtillus, Vaccinium uliginosum and Rhododendron tomentosum. Larvae can be found from August to June. The species overwinters in the larval stage.
