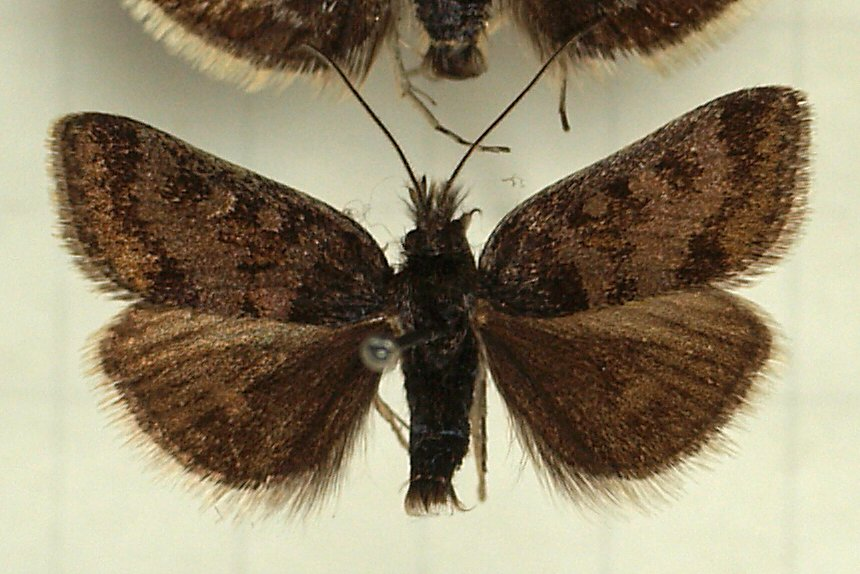

Scientific classification
- Domain: Eukaryota
- Kingdom: Animalia
- Phylum: Arthropoda
- Class: Insecta
- Order: Lepidoptera
- Family: Crambidae
- Genus: Metaxmeste
- Species: M. schrankiana

Binomial name
- Metaxmeste schrankiana (Hochenwarth, 1785)

Synonyms
- Phalaena schrankiana Hochenwarth, 1785; Titanio schrankiana; Hercyna scabralis Eversmann, 1844; Phalaena Noctua lugubrina Esper, 1798; Pyralis holosericealis Hübner, 1796

= Metaxmeste schrankiana =

Species of moth

Metaxmeste schrankiana is a species of moth of the family Crambidae described by Siegmund von Hochenwarth in 1785. It is found in most of western Europe, including France, the Iberian Peninsula, Scandinavia, Germany, Austria, Switzerland, Greece and the Balkans.

The wingspan is 18–23 mm.

The larvae feed on Vaccinium myrtillus, Vaccinium uliginosum, Vaccinium vitis-idaea and Calluna vulgaris.
