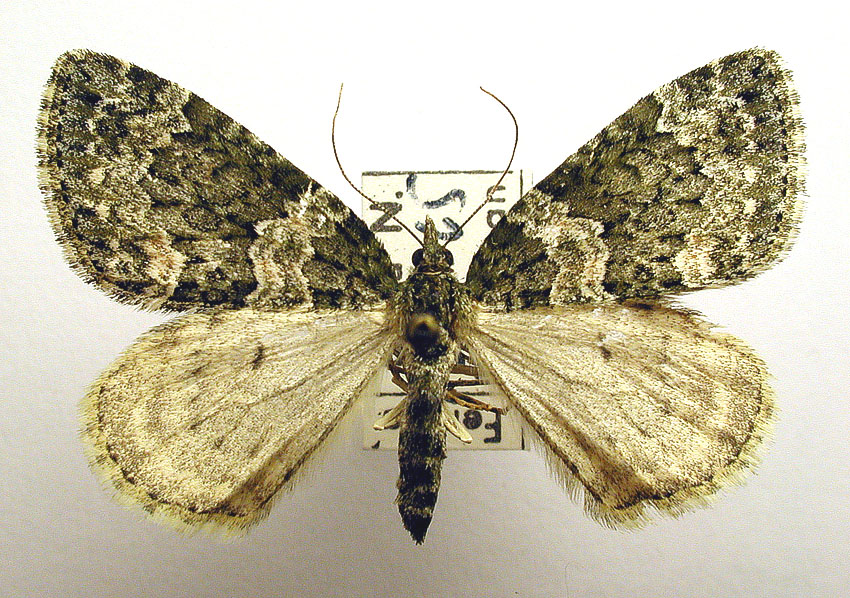

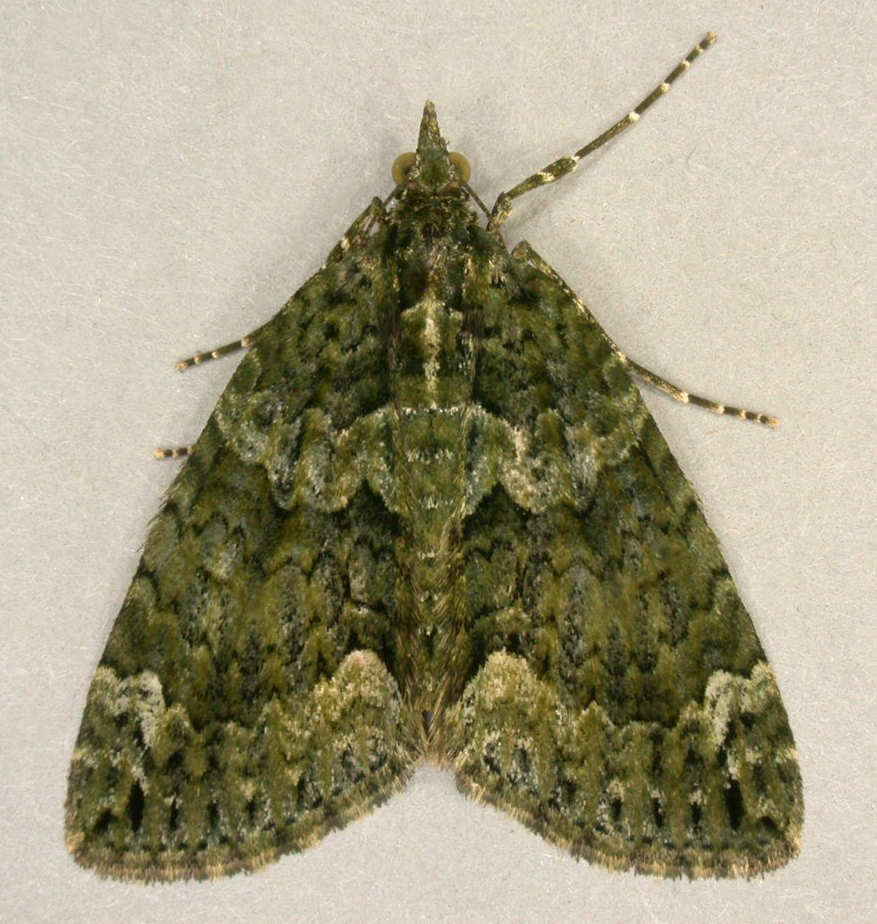

Scientific classification
- Kingdom: Animalia
- Phylum: Arthropoda
- Class: Insecta
- Order: Lepidoptera
- Family: Geometridae
- Genus: Chloroclysta
- Species: C. miata

Binomial name
- Chloroclysta miata (Linnaeus, 1758)

Synonyms
- Phalaena miata Linnaeus, 1758

= Chloroclysta miata =

Autumn green carpet

Species of moth

Chloroclysta miata, the autumn green carpet, is a moth of the family Geometridae. The species was first described by Carl Linnaeus in his 1758 10th edition of Systema Naturae. It is found from most of Europe to the Alatau in Central Asia.

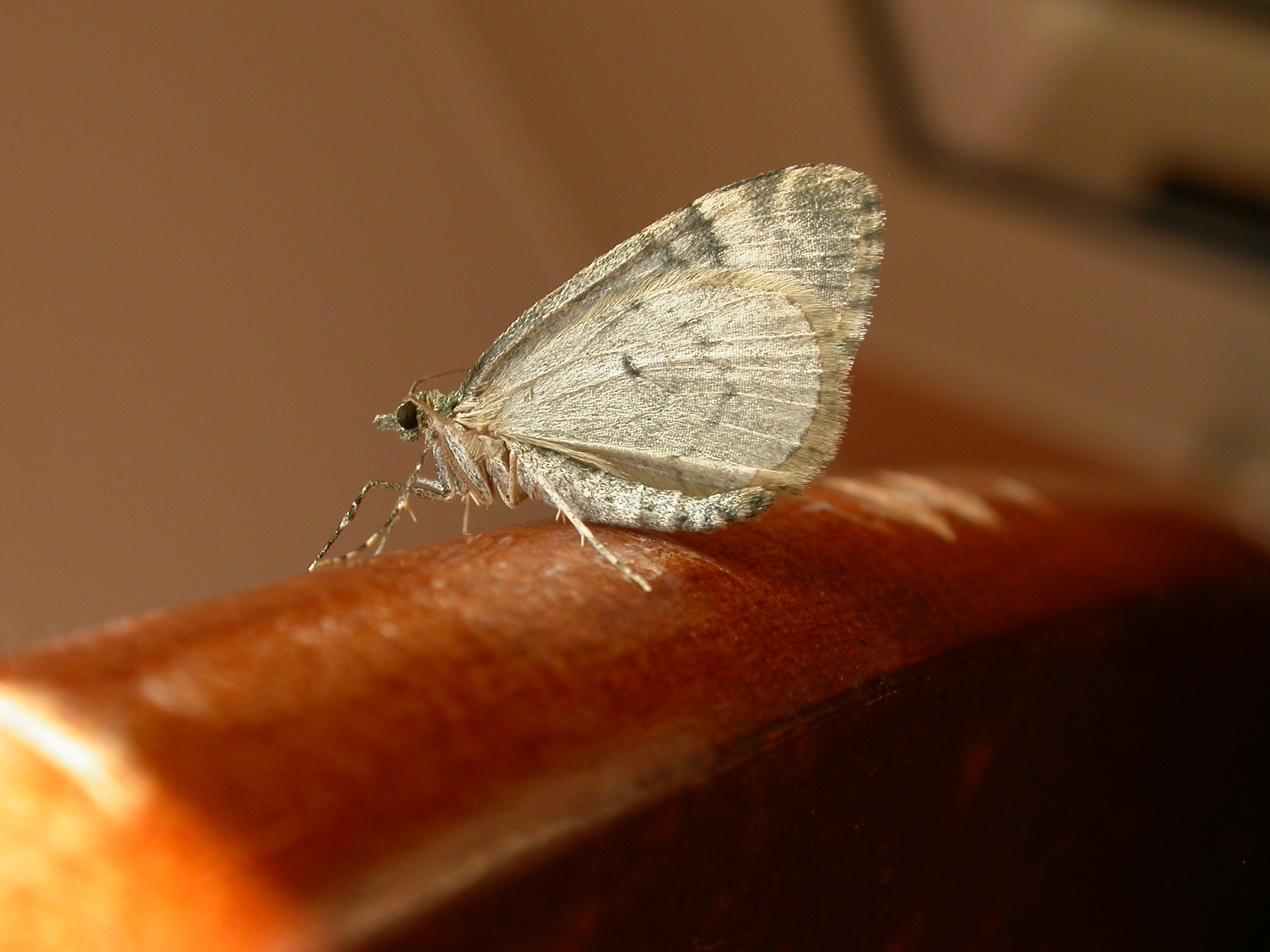

The wingspan is 34–40 mm (1.3–1.6 in). The moth is olive green, with broader forewings. Its crosslines and bands are usually more evenly and extensively whitish. The ground colour of the forewings is olive green or grey green. There is a paler central band and a pale basal area. The crosslines and chevron bands form an intricate pattern. The submarginal line is white. The hindwings are pale grey with a dark discal spot. The larva is naked, long and thin, bright yellow-green with red-purple lateral stripes.

Similar species: Adults are similar in appearance to the red-green carpet (Chloroclysta siterata) but C. siterata has a reddish tinge and darker hindwings.

Adults are on wing from August to November and again (after overwintering as an adult) from April to May.

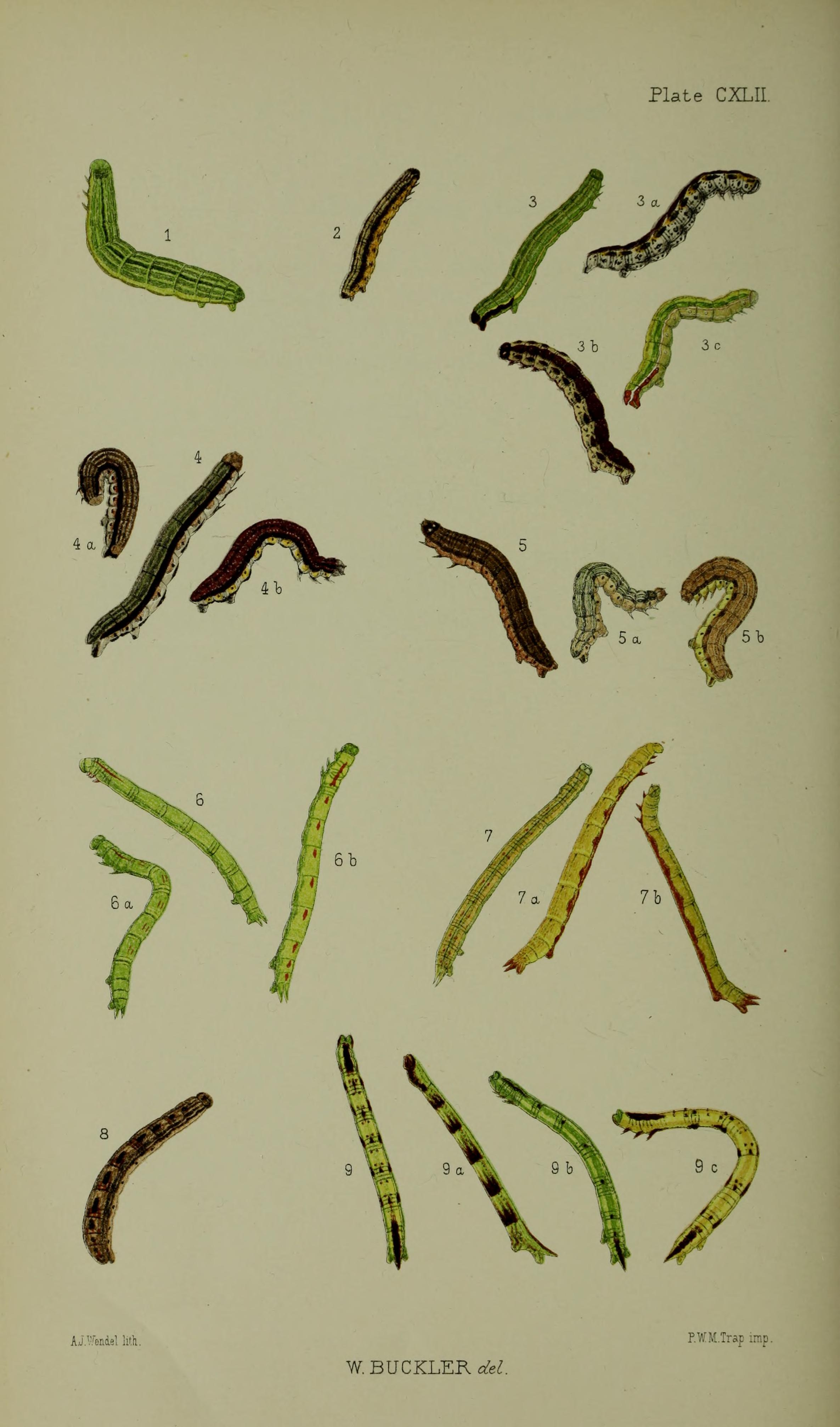
Eight larvae in various stages

The larva feeds on various deciduous trees and shrubs such as Betula verrucosa, Betula pubescens, Salix species (including Salix caprea and Salix phylicifolia), Populus tremula, Sorbus aucuparia, Amelanchier spicata, Prunus padus, Rhamnus frangula, Vaccinium myrtillus, Vaccinium uliginosum. Larvae can be found from May to August.

== Subspecies ==
- Chloroclysta miata miata
- Chloroclysta miata buzurga Wiltshire, 1970
