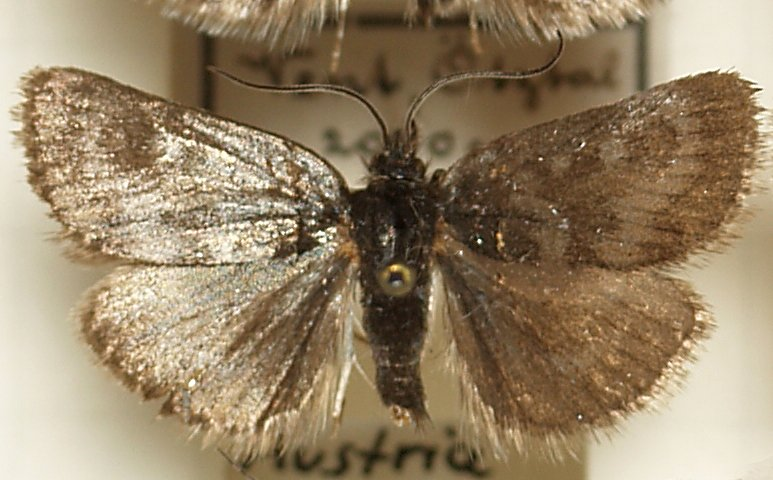

Scientific classification
- Kingdom: Animalia
- Phylum: Arthropoda
- Clade: Pancrustacea
- Class: Insecta
- Order: Lepidoptera
- Family: Crambidae
- Genus: Metaxmeste
- Species: M. phrygialis

Binomial name
- Metaxmeste phrygialis (Hübner, 1796)

Synonyms
- Pyralis phrygialis Hübner, 1796; Metaxmeste cineralis Della Beffa, 1942; Hercyna lineolalis Eversmann, 1844; Hercyna phrygialis var. nevadalis Staudinger, 1859; Metaxmeste phrygialis iberoprovincialis (Luquet, 1997); Metaxmeste sericealis Hübner, 1825; Phalaena (Noctua) monedula Esper, 1805; Pyralis sericalis Hübner, 1796; Pyralis rupicolalis Hübner, 1799; Titanio kardakoffi E. M. Hering, 1940; Titanio phrygialis f. aprutialis Costantini, 1923; Titanio phrygialis var. sericealis Caradja, 1916

= Metaxmeste phrygialis =

Species of moth

Metaxmeste phrygialis is a species of moth of the family Crambidae described by Jacob Hübner in 1796. It is found in mountainous areas of Europe, including the Alps.

The wingspan is about 15 mm. The moth flies from June to August depending on the location.
