= Metaxmeste cinerealis =

Scientific classification
- Domain: Eukaryota
- Kingdom: Animalia
- Phylum: Arthropoda
- Class: Insecta
- Order: Lepidoptera
- Family: Crambidae
- Genus: Metaxmeste
- Species: M. cinerealis

Binomial name
- Metaxmeste cinerealis (Della Beffa, 1942)

Synonyms
- Titanio cinerealis Della Beffa, 1942

Species of moth

Metaxmeste cinerealis is a species of moth in the family Crambidae. It is found in Italy.
