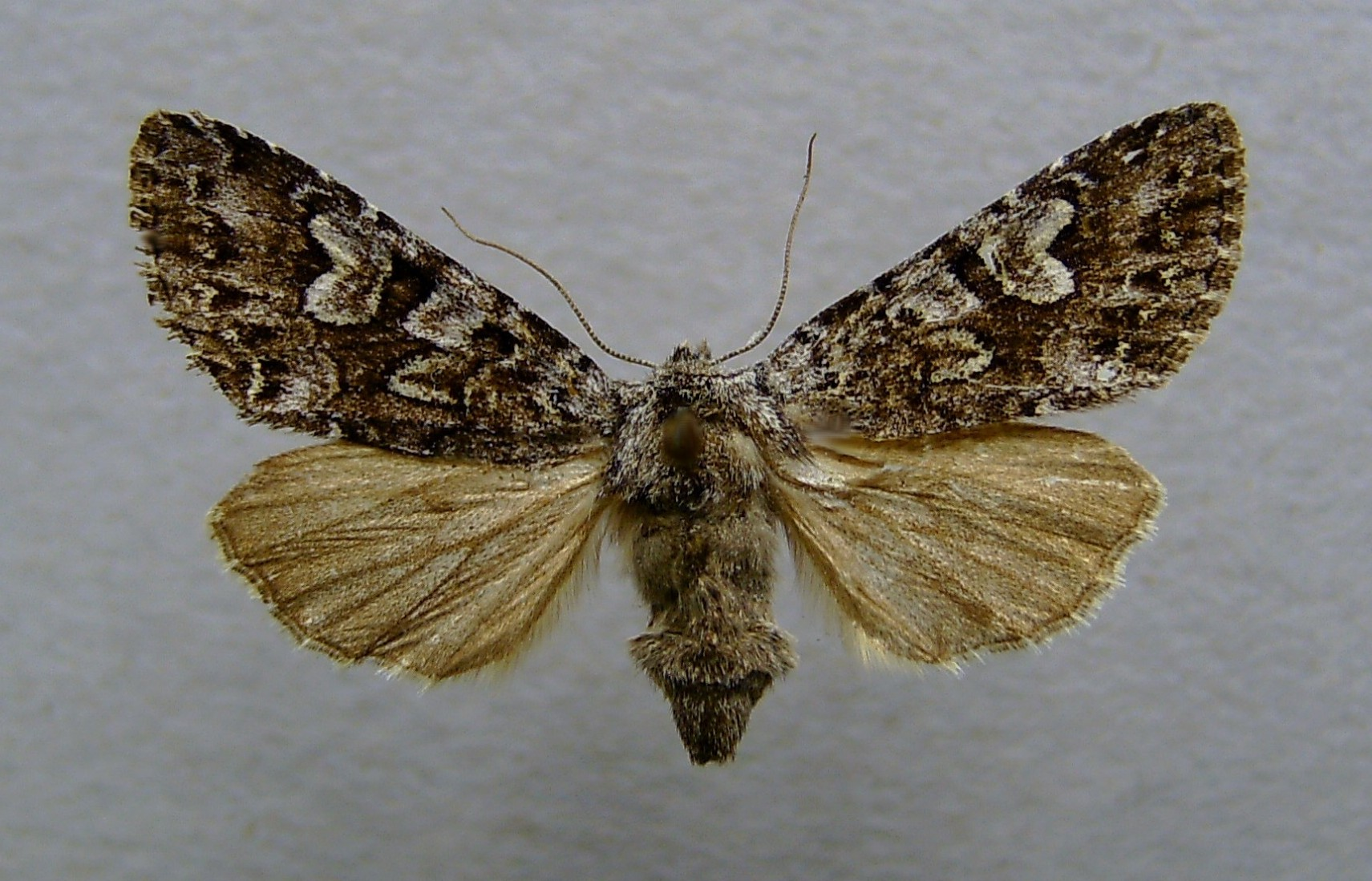

Scientific classification
- Domain: Eukaryota
- Kingdom: Animalia
- Phylum: Arthropoda
- Class: Insecta
- Order: Lepidoptera
- Superfamily: Noctuoidea
- Family: Noctuidae
- Subfamily: Noctuinae
- Tribe: Hadenini
- Genus: Papestra; Sukhareva, 1973

= Papestra =

Genus of moths

Papestra is a genus of moths of the family Noctuidae.

== Species ==
- Papestra biren (Goeze, 1781)
- Papestra brenda (Barnes & McDunnough, 1916)
- Papestra cristifera (Walker, 1858)
- Papestra invalida (Smith, 1891)
- Papestra quadrata (Smith, 1891)
