= Metaxmeste elbursana =

Scientific classification
- Domain: Eukaryota
- Kingdom: Animalia
- Phylum: Arthropoda
- Class: Insecta
- Order: Lepidoptera
- Family: Crambidae
- Genus: Metaxmeste
- Species: M. elbursana

Binomial name
- Metaxmeste elbursana (Amsel, 1961)

Synonyms
- Threnodes elbursana Amsel, 1961

Species of moth

Metaxmeste elbursana is a moth in the family Crambidae. It was described by Hans Georg Amsel in 1961. It is found in Iran.
