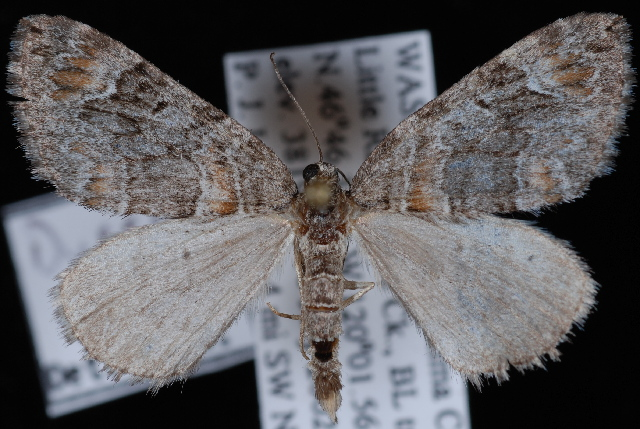

Scientific classification
- Domain: Eukaryota
- Kingdom: Animalia
- Phylum: Arthropoda
- Class: Insecta
- Order: Lepidoptera
- Family: Geometridae
- Genus: Dysstroma
- Species: D. formosa

Binomial name
- Dysstroma formosa (Hulst, 1896)

= Dysstroma formosa =

Species of moth

Dysstroma formosa, the Formosa carpet moth, is a species of geometrid moth in the family Geometridae. It is found in North America.

The MONA or Hodges number for Dysstroma formosa is 7191.
