= Metaxmeste staudingeri =

Scientific classification
- Domain: Eukaryota
- Kingdom: Animalia
- Phylum: Arthropoda
- Class: Insecta
- Order: Lepidoptera
- Family: Crambidae
- Genus: Metaxmeste
- Species: M. staudingeri

Binomial name
- Metaxmeste staudingeri (Christoph, 1873)

Synonyms
- Hercyna staudingeri Christoph, 1873

Species of moth

Metaxmeste staudingeri is a moth in the family Crambidae. It was described by Hugo Theodor Christoph in 1873. It is found in Iran.
