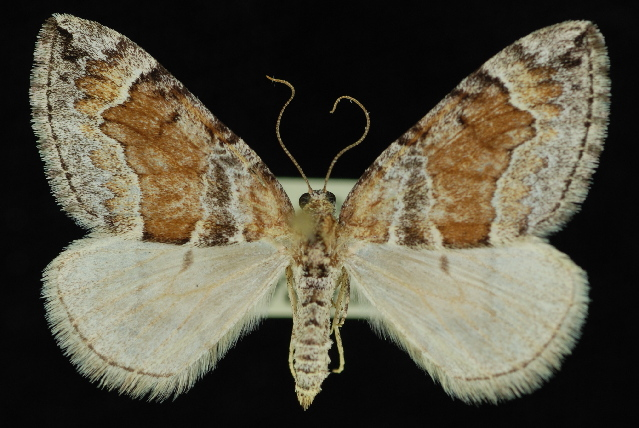

Scientific classification
- Kingdom: Animalia
- Phylum: Arthropoda
- Clade: Pancrustacea
- Class: Insecta
- Order: Lepidoptera
- Family: Geometridae
- Tribe: Cidariini
- Genus: Dysstroma
- Species: D. colvillei

Binomial name
- Dysstroma colvillei Blackmore, 1926

= Dysstroma colvillei =

Species of moth

Dysstroma colvillei is a species of geometrid moth in the family Geometridae. It is found in North America.
