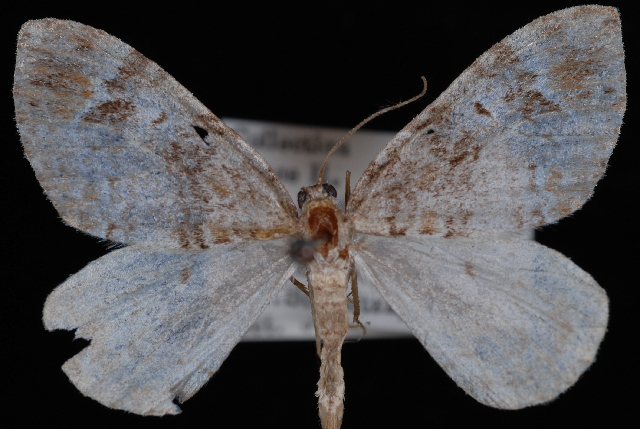

Scientific classification
- Kingdom: Animalia
- Phylum: Arthropoda
- Class: Insecta
- Order: Lepidoptera
- Family: Geometridae
- Tribe: Cidariini
- Genus: Dysstroma
- Species: D. mancipata

Binomial name
- Dysstroma mancipata (Guenée in Boisduval & Guenée, 1858)

= Dysstroma mancipata =

Species of moth

Dysstroma mancipata is a species of geometrid moth in the family Geometridae. It is found in North America.

The MONA or Hodges number for Dysstroma mancipata is 7195.
