= Dysstroma suspectata =

Scientific classification
- Kingdom: Animalia
- Phylum: Arthropoda
- Class: Insecta
- Order: Lepidoptera
- Family: Geometridae
- Tribe: Cidariini
- Genus: Dysstroma
- Species: D. suspectata

Binomial name
- Dysstroma suspectata (Möschler, 1874)

Species of moth

Dysstroma suspectata is a species of geometrid moth in the family Geometridae. It is found in North America.

== Subspecies ==
These two subspecies belong to the species Dysstroma suspectata:

- Dysstroma suspectata mackieata Cassino & Swett, 1923
- Dysstroma suspectata suspectata (Möschler, 1874)
