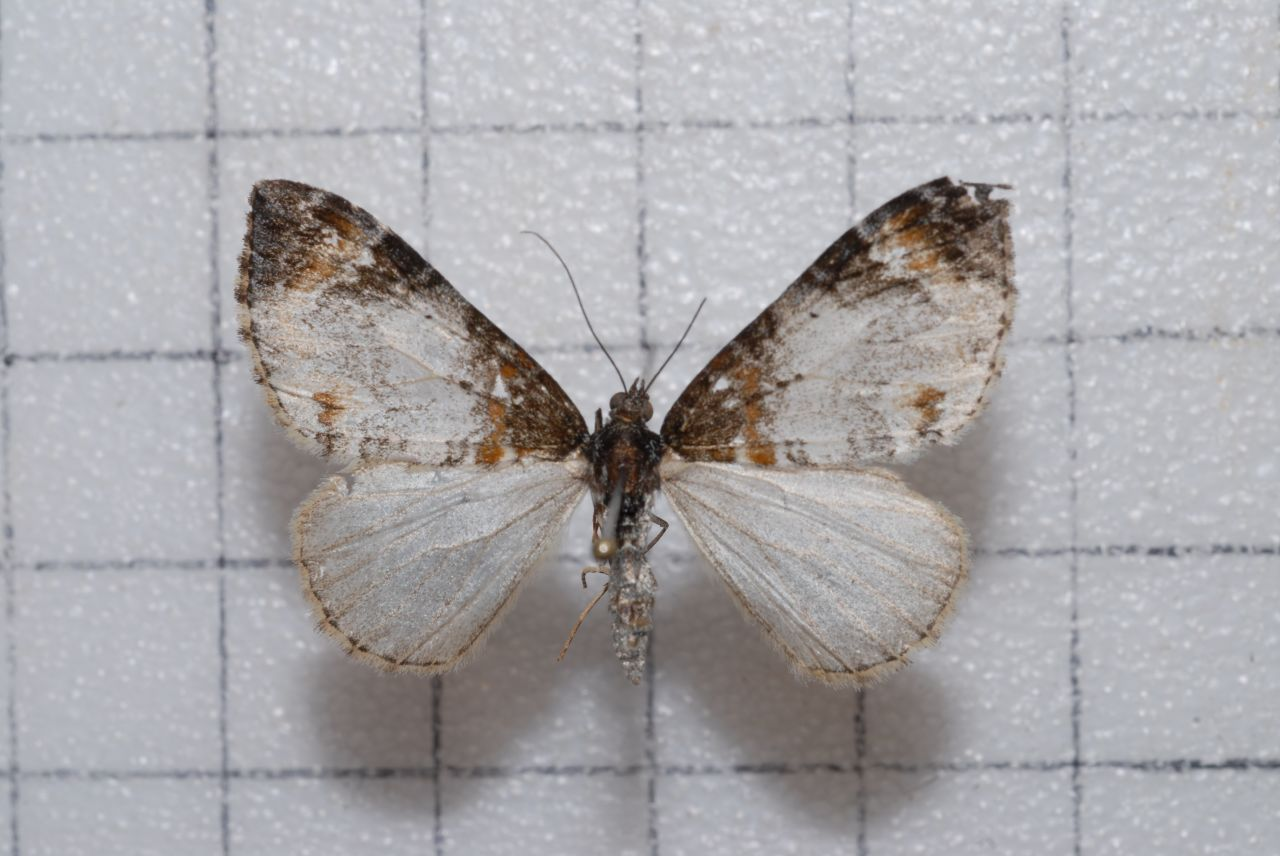

Scientific classification
- Domain: Eukaryota
- Kingdom: Animalia
- Phylum: Arthropoda
- Class: Insecta
- Order: Lepidoptera
- Family: Geometridae
- Genus: Dysstroma
- Species: D. cinereata

Binomial name
- Dysstroma cinereata (Moore, 1867)

Synonyms
- Cidaria cinereata Moore 1868; Dysstroma cinereatum; Cidaria japonica Heydemann, 1929; Dysstroma japonica

= Dysstroma cinereata =

Species of moth

Dysstroma cinereata is a moth of the family Geometridae. It is found in eastern Asia.

The wingspan is 28–35 mm.

== Subspecies ==
- Dysstroma cinereata cinereata (India, Taiwan)
- Dysstroma cinereata japonicum Heydemann, 1929 (Japan, Korea)
