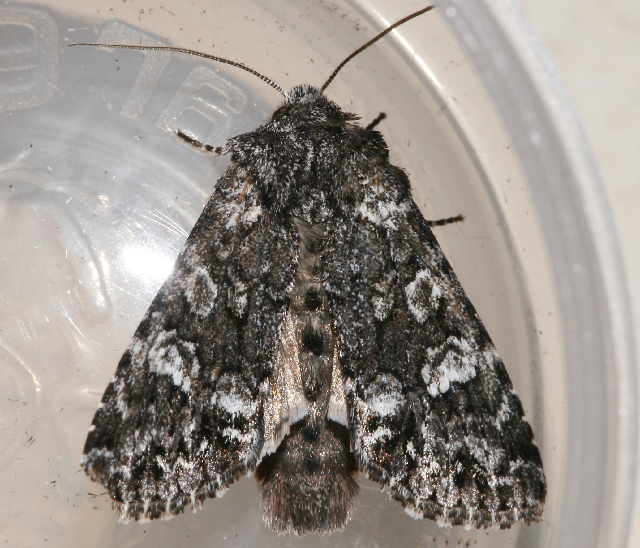

Scientific classification
- Kingdom: Animalia
- Phylum: Arthropoda
- Class: Insecta
- Order: Lepidoptera
- Superfamily: Noctuoidea
- Family: Noctuidae
- Tribe: Hadenini
- Genus: Papestra
- Species: P. cristifera

Binomial name
- Papestra cristifera (Walker, 1858)

= Papestra cristifera =

Species of moth

Papestra cristifera is a species of cutworm or dart moth in the family Noctuidae. It is found in North America.

The MONA or Hodges number for Papestra cristifera is 10312.
