= Papestra invalida =

Scientific classification
- Kingdom: Animalia
- Phylum: Arthropoda
- Clade: Pancrustacea
- Class: Insecta
- Order: Lepidoptera
- Superfamily: Noctuoidea
- Family: Noctuidae
- Tribe: Hadenini
- Genus: Papestra
- Species: P. invalida

Binomial name
- Papestra invalida (Smith, 1891)

Species of moth

Papestra invalida is a species of cutworm or dart moth in the family Noctuidae. It is found in North America.

The MONA or Hodges number for Papestra invalida is 10314.
