= Metaxmeste nubicola =

Scientific classification
- Domain: Eukaryota
- Kingdom: Animalia
- Phylum: Arthropoda
- Class: Insecta
- Order: Lepidoptera
- Family: Crambidae
- Genus: Metaxmeste
- Species: M. nubicola

Binomial name
- Metaxmeste nubicola Munroe, 1954

Species of moth

Metaxmeste nubicola is a moth in the family Crambidae. It was described by Eugene G. Munroe in 1954. It is found in North America, where it has been recorded from Colorado and Washington. The habitat consists of arctic-alpine areas.
