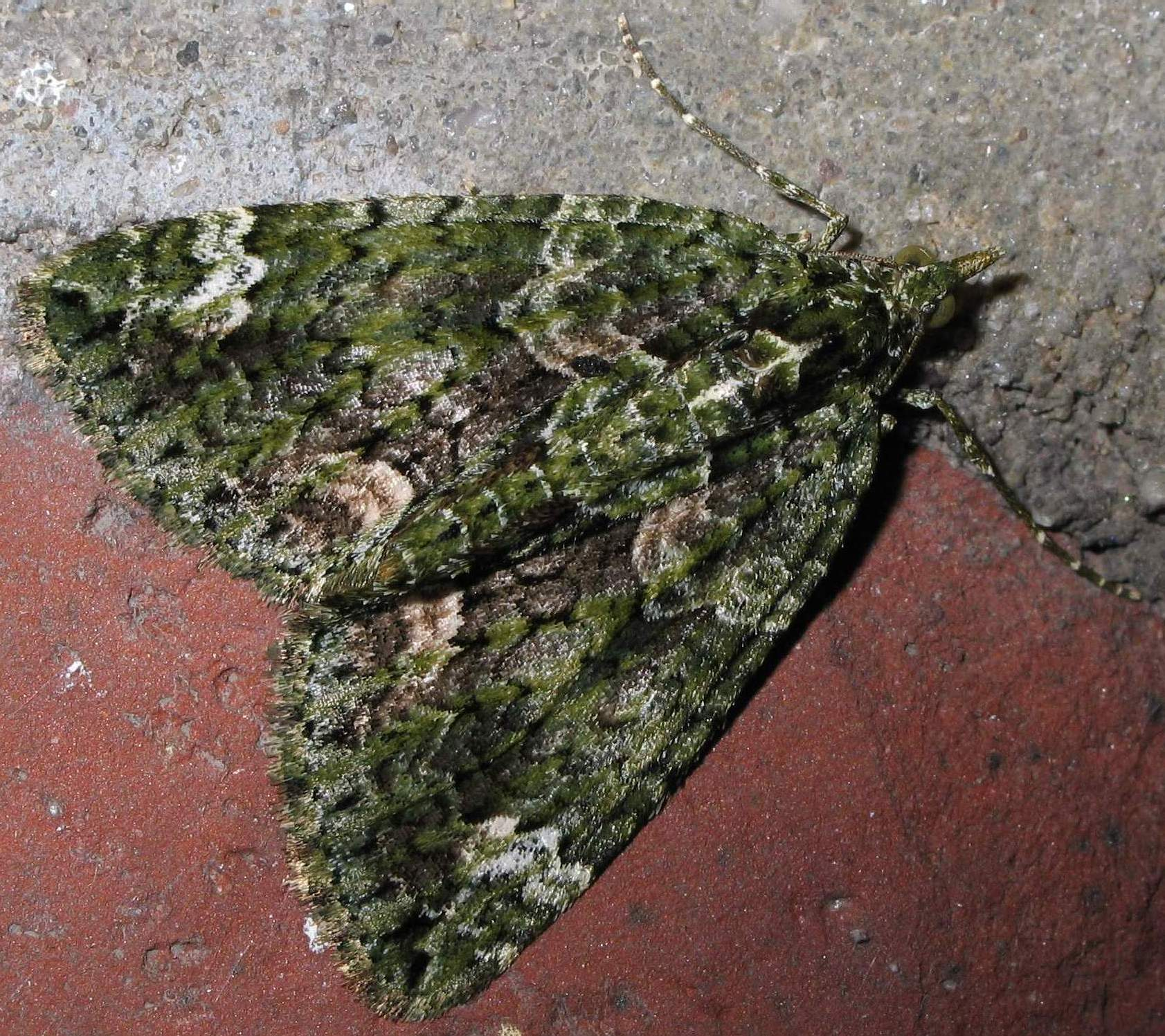

Scientific classification
- Domain: Eukaryota
- Kingdom: Animalia
- Phylum: Arthropoda
- Class: Insecta
- Order: Lepidoptera
- Family: Geometridae
- Genus: Chloroclysta
- Species: C. siterata

Binomial name
- Chloroclysta siterata (Hufnagel, 1767)

= Chloroclysta siterata =

Red-green carpet

Species of moth

Chloroclysta siterata, the red-green carpet, is a moth in the family Geometridae. The species was first described by Johann Siegfried Hufnagel in 1767.

== Distribution ==
Palearctic most of Europe to Asia Minor and the Caucasus.

== Description ==
The wingspan is 28–36 mm. The ground colour of the forewings is greyish green, with a reddish tinge. The central band is dark and may be replaced by dark wavy crosslines. The forewings have a pointed shape. This is a very variable species. The larva is very long and slender, the thorax slightly less thin, the anal points well developed. It is green, the thorax with a red dorsal line, abdomen with a red dorsal spot on each segment, the legs and anal points tipped with red. The pupa is slender, yellow-brown with a delicate purple bloom, dotted with black; cremaster darker.

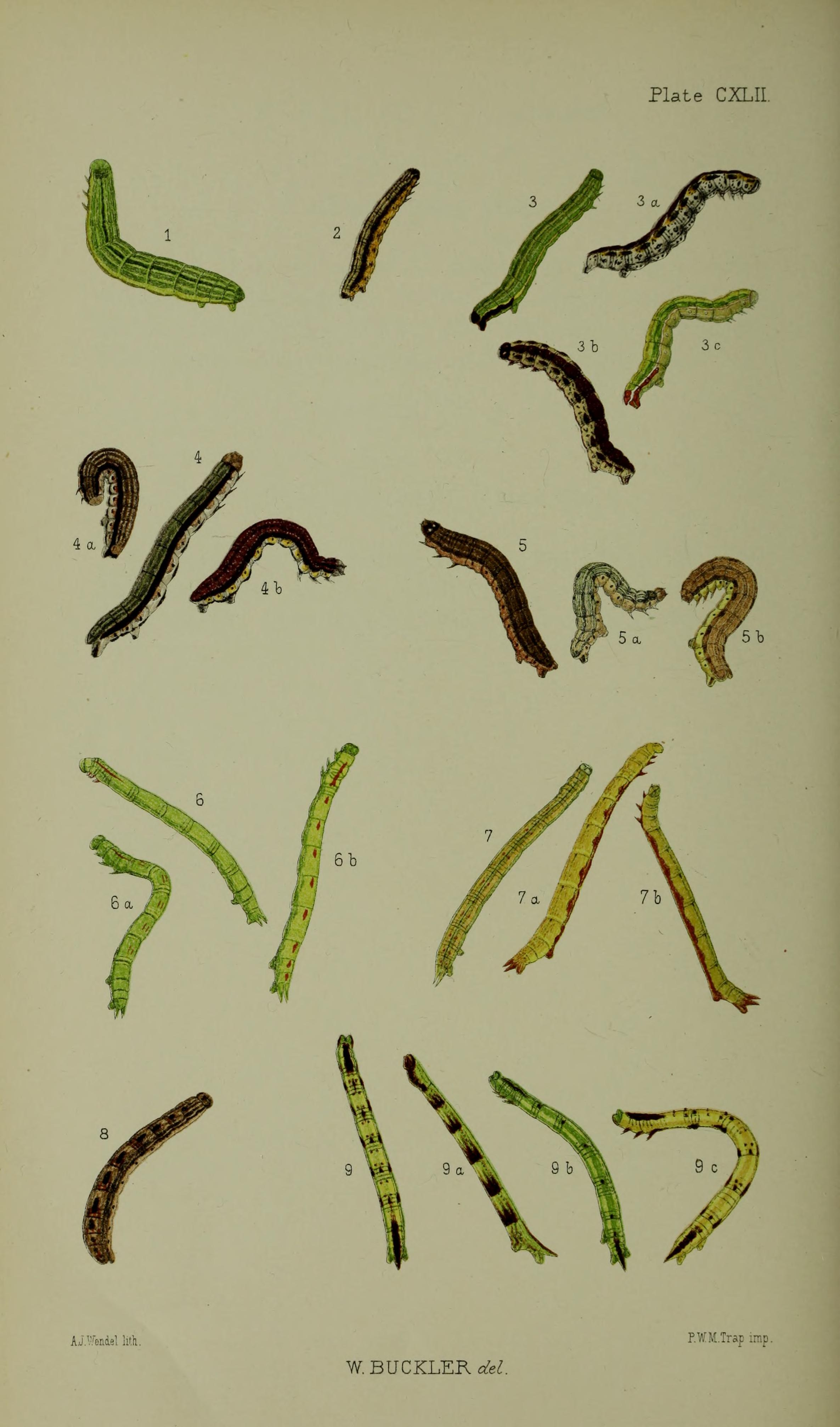
Figs. 6,6a,6b larvae in various stages

Similar species: Adults are similar in appearance to the autumn green carpet (Chloroclysta miata) but C. miata has a pale central band, grey hindwings and no red tinge.

== Biology ==
The larva feeds on Populus tremula, Salix caprea, Quercus robur, Quercus petraea, Quercus rubra, Chaenomeles japonica, Sorbus aucuparia, Rosa canina, Rosa vosagiaca, Prunus serrulata, Acer pseudoplatanus, Frangula alnus and Tilia (linden).
