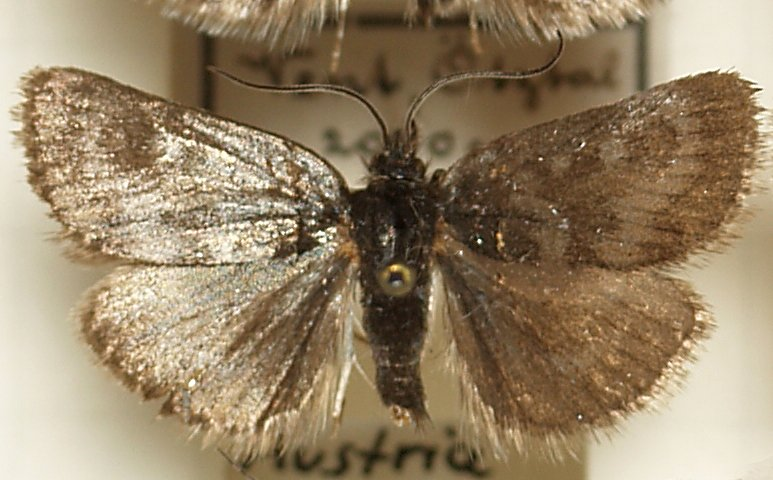
- Metaxmeste phrygialis

Scientific classification
- Domain: Eukaryota
- Kingdom: Animalia
- Phylum: Arthropoda
- Class: Insecta
- Order: Lepidoptera
- Family: Crambidae
- Tribe: Odontiini
- Genus: Metaxmeste; Hübner, 1825

Synonyms
- Hercyna Treitschke, 1828; Heryna Wocke, 1871; Metaxmestes Hübner, 1826

= Metaxmeste =

Genus of moths

Metaxmeste is a genus of moths of the family Crambidae.

== Species ==
- Metaxmeste cinerealis (Della Beffa, 1942)
- Metaxmeste elbursana (Amsel, 1961)
- Metaxmeste nubicola Munroe, 1954
- Metaxmeste phrygialis (Hübner, 1796)
- Metaxmeste schrankiana (Hochenwarth, 1785)
- Metaxmeste sericatalis (Herrich-Schäffer, 1848)
- Metaxmeste staudingeri (Christoph, 1873)
