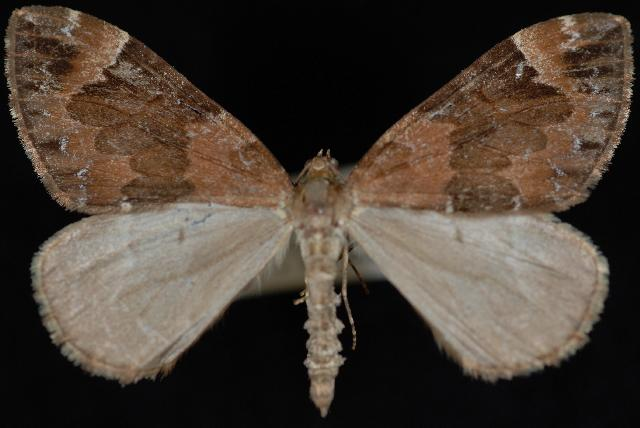

Scientific classification
- Kingdom: Animalia
- Phylum: Arthropoda
- Class: Insecta
- Order: Lepidoptera
- Family: Geometridae
- Genus: Dysstroma
- Species: D. ochrofuscaria

Binomial name
- Dysstroma ochrofuscaria Ferguson in Hodges, 1983

= Dysstroma ochrofuscaria =

Species of moth

Dysstroma ochrofuscaria is a moth in the family Geometridae described by Douglas C. Ferguson in 1983. It is found in North America.

The MONA or Hodges number for Dysstroma ochrofuscaria is 7186.

== Notes ==
- Dysstroma ochrofuscaria was originally published as an unavailable infrasubspecific name 'Dysstroma mulleolata, ab. ochrofuscaria, nov.' in Swett, 1917. Hodges et al. (1983) was the first to publish it as a species name.
