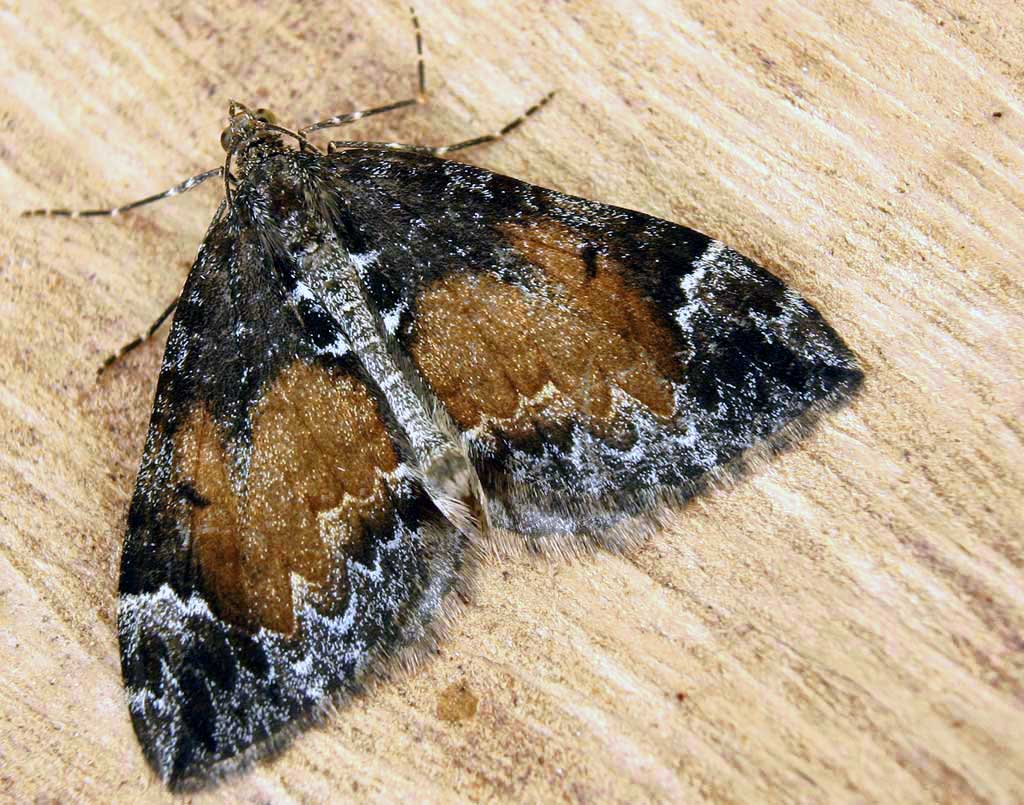
- Dysstroma truncata

Scientific classification
- Kingdom: Animalia
- Phylum: Arthropoda
- Clade: Pancrustacea
- Class: Insecta
- Order: Lepidoptera
- Family: Geometridae
- Tribe: Cidariini
- Genus: Dysstroma; Hübner, 1825

Synonyms
- Polyphasia Stephens, 1831

= Dysstroma =

Genus of moths

Dysstroma is a genus of moths in the family Geometridae erected by Jacob Hübner in 1825.

== Species ==
- Dysstroma brunneata (Packard, 1867)
- Dysstroma brunneoviridatum (Heydemann, 1938)
- Dysstroma cinereata (Moore, 1867)
- Dysstroma citrata (Linnaeus, 1761) – dark marbled carpet
- Dysstroma colvillei Blackmore, 1926
- Dysstroma concinnata (Stephens, 1831)
- Dysstroma corussaria (Oberthür, 1880)
- Dysstroma dentifera (Warren 1896)
- Dysstroma formosa (Hulst, 1896)
- Dysstroma hersiliata (Guenée, 1857)
- Dysstroma fumata (Bastelberger, 1911)
- Dysstroma hewlettaria W.S. Wright, 1927
- Dysstroma infuscata (Tengström, 1869)
- Dysstroma korbi Heydemann, 1929
- Dysstroma latefasciata (Staudinger, 1889)
- Dysstroma mancipata (Guenée, 1857)
- Dysstroma ochrofuscaria Swett, 1917
- Dysstroma pseudimmanata (Heydemann, 1929)
- Dysstroma rectiflavata McDunnough, 1941
- Dysstroma rutlandia McDunnough, 1943
- Dysstroma sikkimensis Heydemann, 1932
- Dysstroma sobria Swett, 1917
- Dysstroma subapicarium (Moore, 1868)
- Dysstroma suspectana (Möschler, 1874)
- Dysstroma suspectata (Möschler, 1874)
- Dysstroma truncata (Hufnagel, 1767) – common marbled carpet
- Dysstroma walkerata (Pearsall, 1909)
