= Metaxmeste sericatalis =

Scientific classification
- Kingdom: Animalia
- Phylum: Arthropoda
- Class: Insecta
- Order: Lepidoptera
- Family: Crambidae
- Genus: Metaxmeste
- Species: M. sericatalis

Binomial name
- Metaxmeste sericatalis (Herrich-Schaffer, 1848)

Synonyms
- Hercyna sericatalis Herrich-Schaffer, 1848

Species of moth

Metaxmeste sericatalis is a species of moth in the family Crambidae. It is found in Turkey. Its type locality is Constantinople, which at the time of description was predominantly on the European side of Bosporus. It is nevertheless uncertain whether it occurs in the European part of Turkey. There is a modern record from eastern Turkey. Records from Portugal are likely erraneous.
