= Dysstroma rectiflavata =

Scientific classification
- Kingdom: Animalia
- Phylum: Arthropoda
- Class: Insecta
- Order: Lepidoptera
- Family: Geometridae
- Genus: Dysstroma
- Species: D. rectiflavata

Binomial name
- Dysstroma rectiflavata McDunnough, 1941

Species of moth

Dysstroma rectiflavata is a species of geometrid moth in the family Geometridae. It is found in North America.

The MONA or Hodges number for Dysstroma rectiflavata is 7193.
