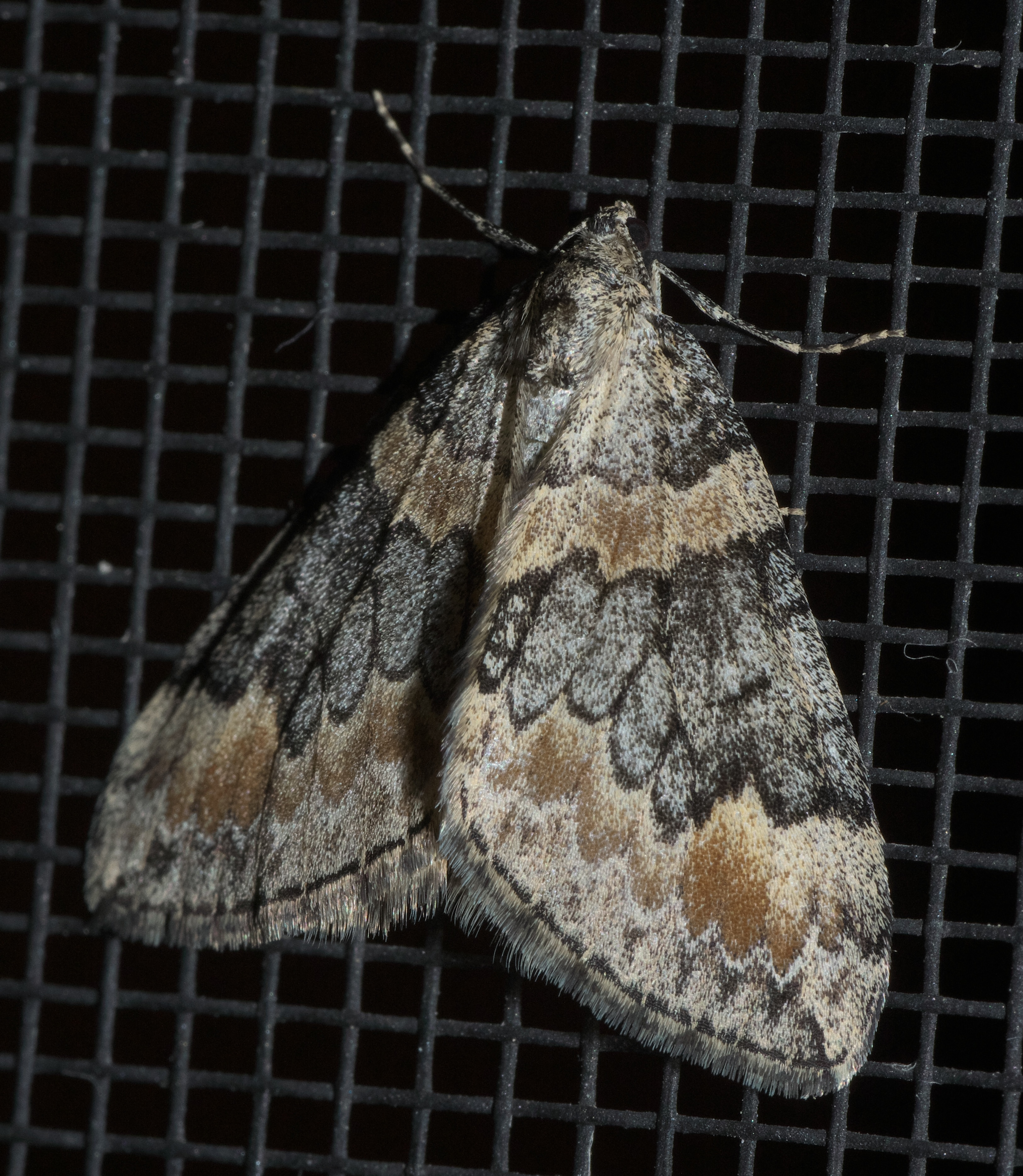

Scientific classification
- Kingdom: Animalia
- Phylum: Arthropoda
- Clade: Pancrustacea
- Class: Insecta
- Order: Lepidoptera
- Family: Geometridae
- Genus: Dysstroma
- Species: D. brunneata

Binomial name
- Dysstroma brunneata (Packard, 1867)

= Dysstroma brunneata =

Species of moth

Dysstroma brunneata is a species of geometrid moth in the family Geometridae. It is found in North America.

The MONA or Hodges number for Dysstroma brunneata is 7194.
