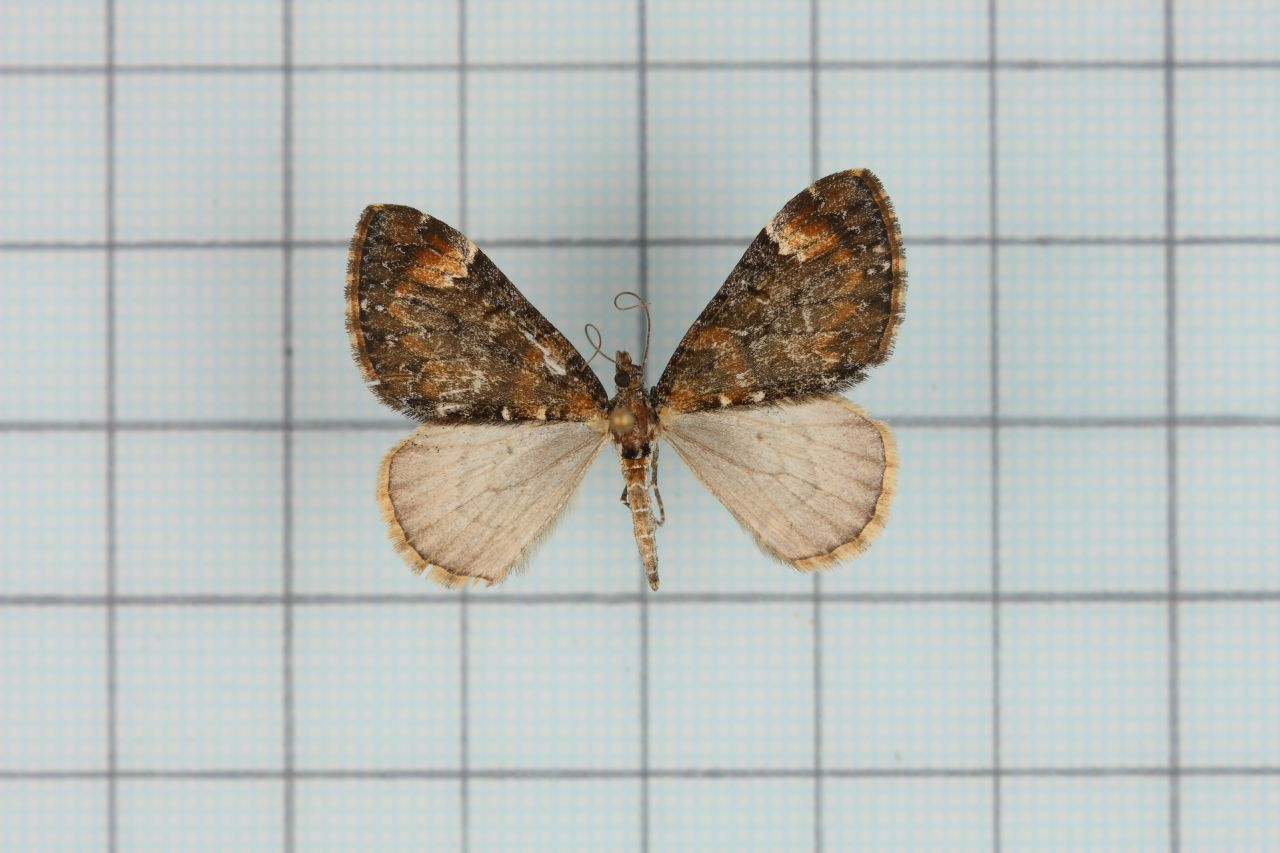

Scientific classification
- Domain: Eukaryota
- Kingdom: Animalia
- Phylum: Arthropoda
- Class: Insecta
- Order: Lepidoptera
- Family: Geometridae
- Genus: Dysstroma
- Species: D. fumata

Binomial name
- Dysstroma fumata (Bastelberger, 1911)

Synonyms
- Polyphasia fumata Bastelberger, 1911; Dysstroma fumatum

= Dysstroma fumata =

Species of moth

Dysstroma fumata is a moth of the family Geometridae. It is found in Taiwan.
