= Dysstroma walkerata =

Scientific classification
- Kingdom: Animalia
- Phylum: Arthropoda
- Class: Insecta
- Order: Lepidoptera
- Family: Geometridae
- Tribe: Cidariini
- Genus: Dysstroma
- Species: D. walkerata

Binomial name
- Dysstroma walkerata (Pearsall, 1909)

Species of moth

Dysstroma walkerata, known generally as the orange-spotted carpet moth or marbled carpet moth, is a species of geometrid moth in the family Geometridae. It is found in North America.

The MONA or Hodges number for Dysstroma walkerata is 7188.
