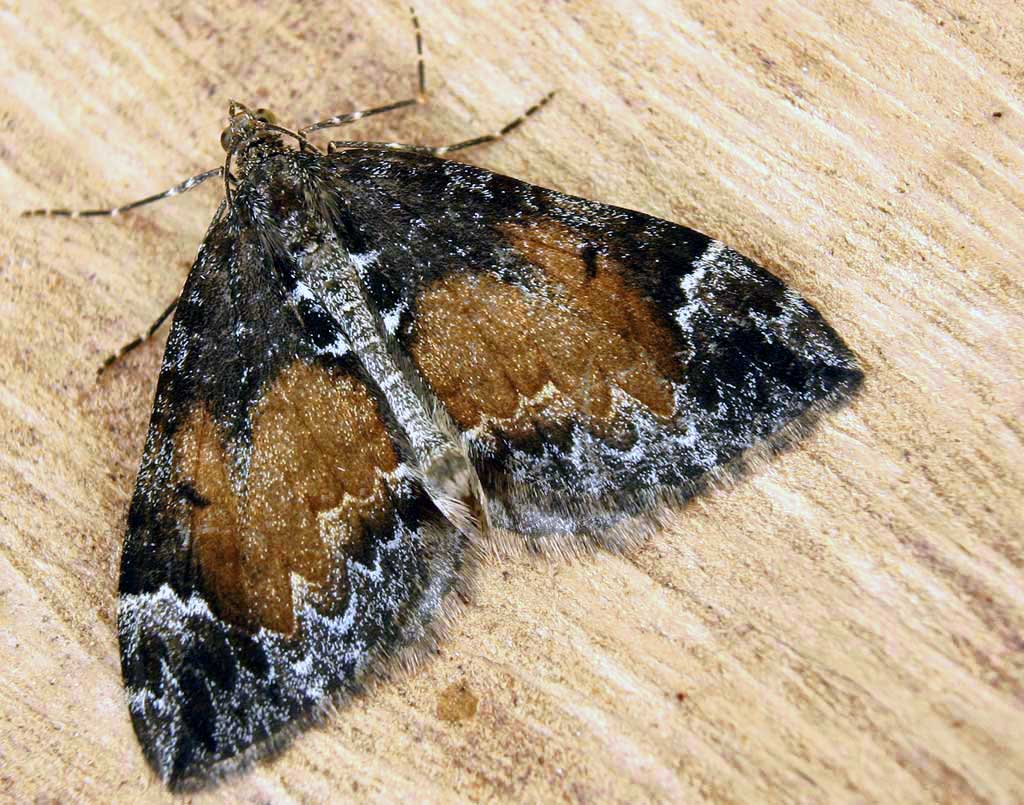

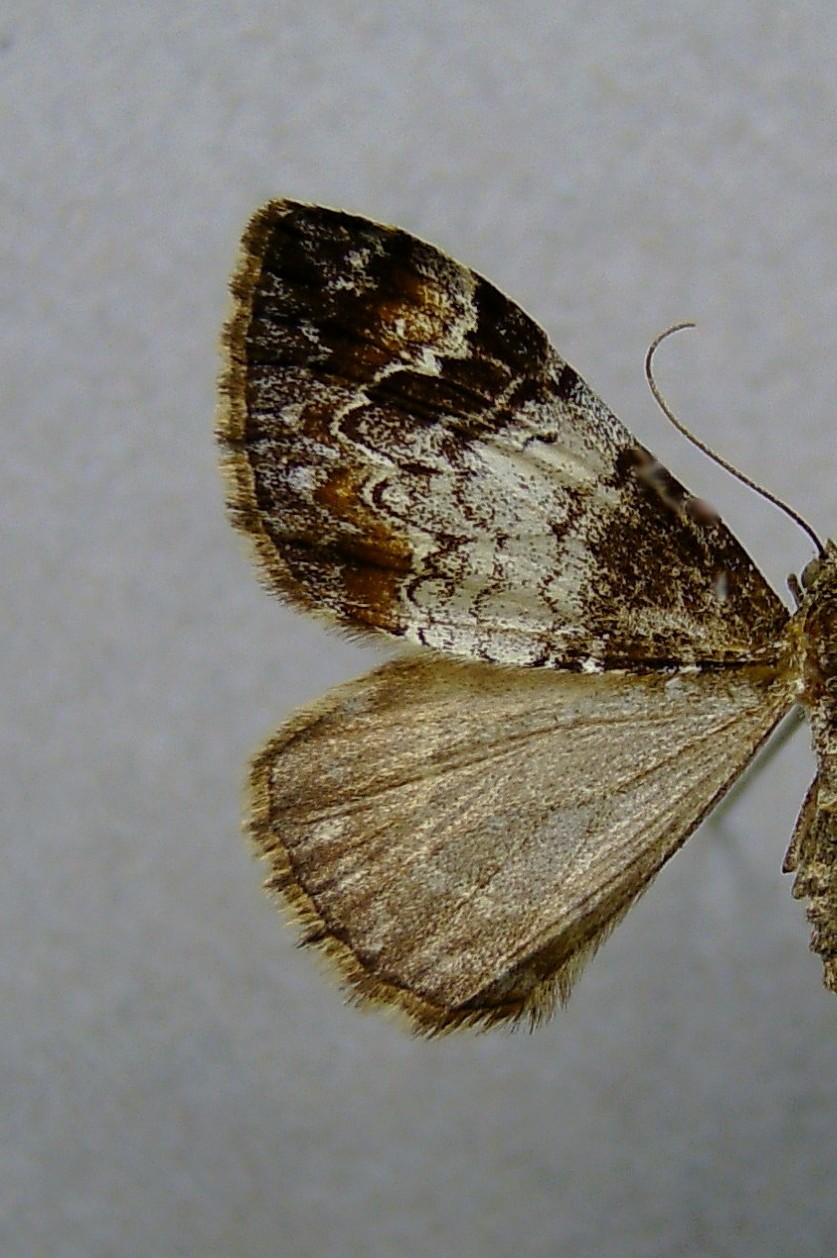

Scientific classification
- Domain: Eukaryota
- Kingdom: Animalia
- Phylum: Arthropoda
- Class: Insecta
- Order: Lepidoptera
- Family: Geometridae
- Genus: Dysstroma
- Species: D. truncata

Binomial name
- Dysstroma truncata (Hufnagel, 1767)

Synonyms
- Chloroclysta truncata (Hufnagel, 1767); Larentia truncata; Cidaria truncata

= Common marbled carpet =

Species of moth

The common marbled carpet (Dysstroma truncata) is a moth of the family Geometridae. It is sometimes placed in the genus Chloroclysta. It is very common throughout the Palearctic region and the Near East. The species was first described by Johann Siegfried Hufnagel in 1767.

This is one of the most variable of the geometrids both in size (wingspan 32–39 mm) and colour. The basal and terminal areas of the forewings are marked with fascia separated by a large plain area in the middle, but the colouration of all these areas is confusingly variable from white to black with various grey, brown and reddish tones in between. The hindwings, though, are always pale grey marked with faint fascia. Some forms closely resemble Dysstroma citrata.

One or two broods are produced each year and the adults can be seen in any month from May to November. The species flies at night and is attracted to light. It is also attracted to nectar-rich flowers and sugary foods which is fairly unusual for the family.

The larva is slender and green, usually with reddish stripes. It has been recorded feeding on a wide range of plants (see list below). The species overwinters as a larva.

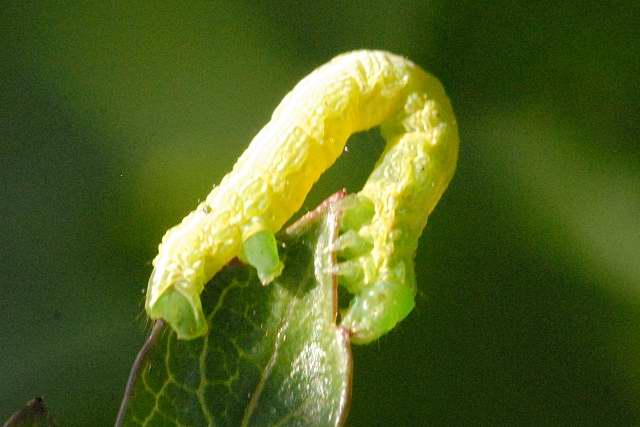
Caterpillar

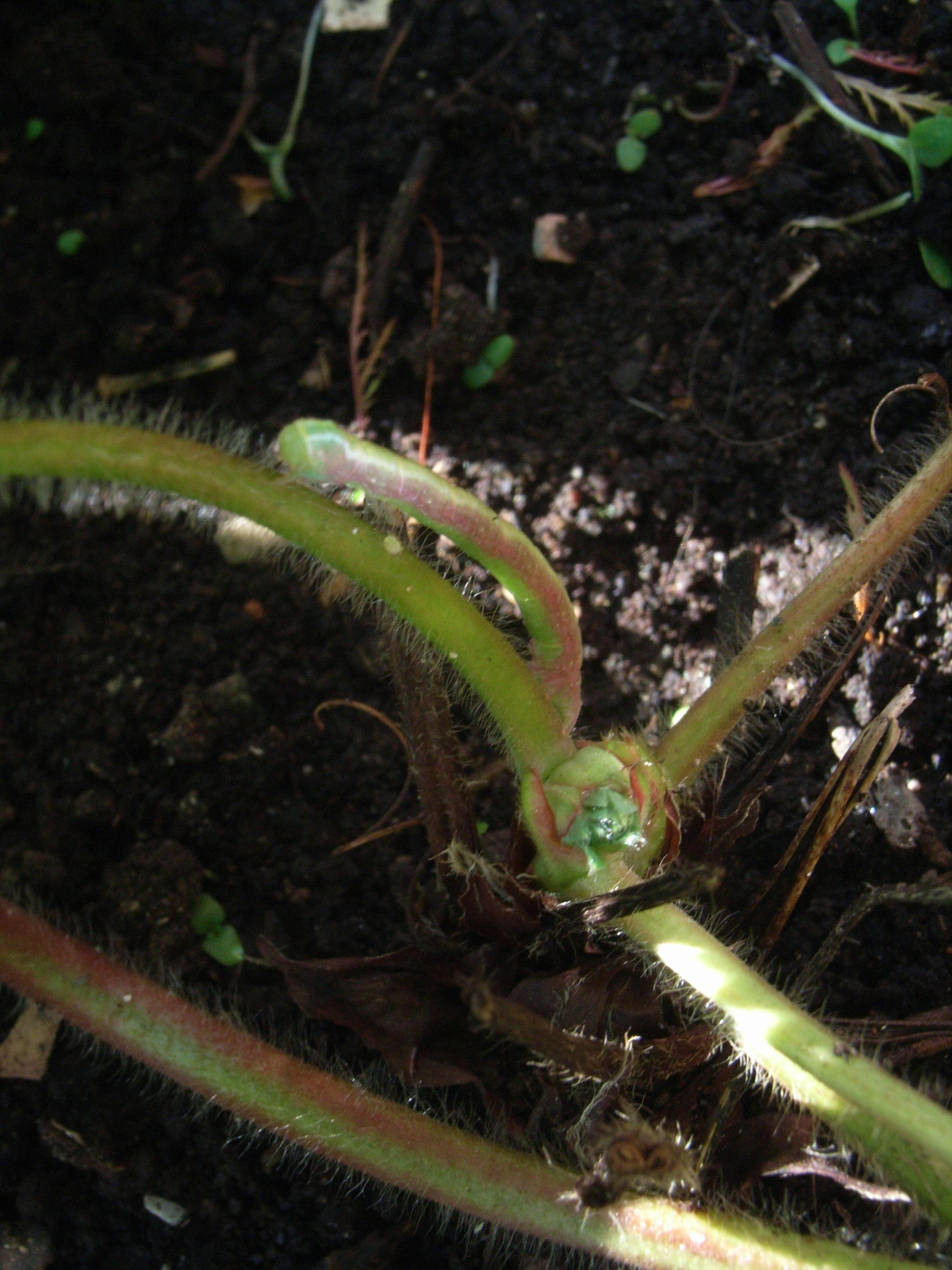
Larva on a strawberry plant. Note the match between the reddish stripe on the larva and on the petioles.

1. The flight season refers to the British Isles. This may vary in other parts of the range.

== Recorded food plants ==
- Alnus - alder
- Betula - birch
- Crataegus - hawthorn
- Fragaria - strawberry
- Ligustrum - privet
- Lonicera - honeysuckle
- Prunus - bird cherry
- Rosa - rose
- Rubus - bramble
- Rumex - dock
- Salix - willow
- Sorbus - rowan
- Vaccinium
- Parthenocissus quinquefolia - Virginia creeper
