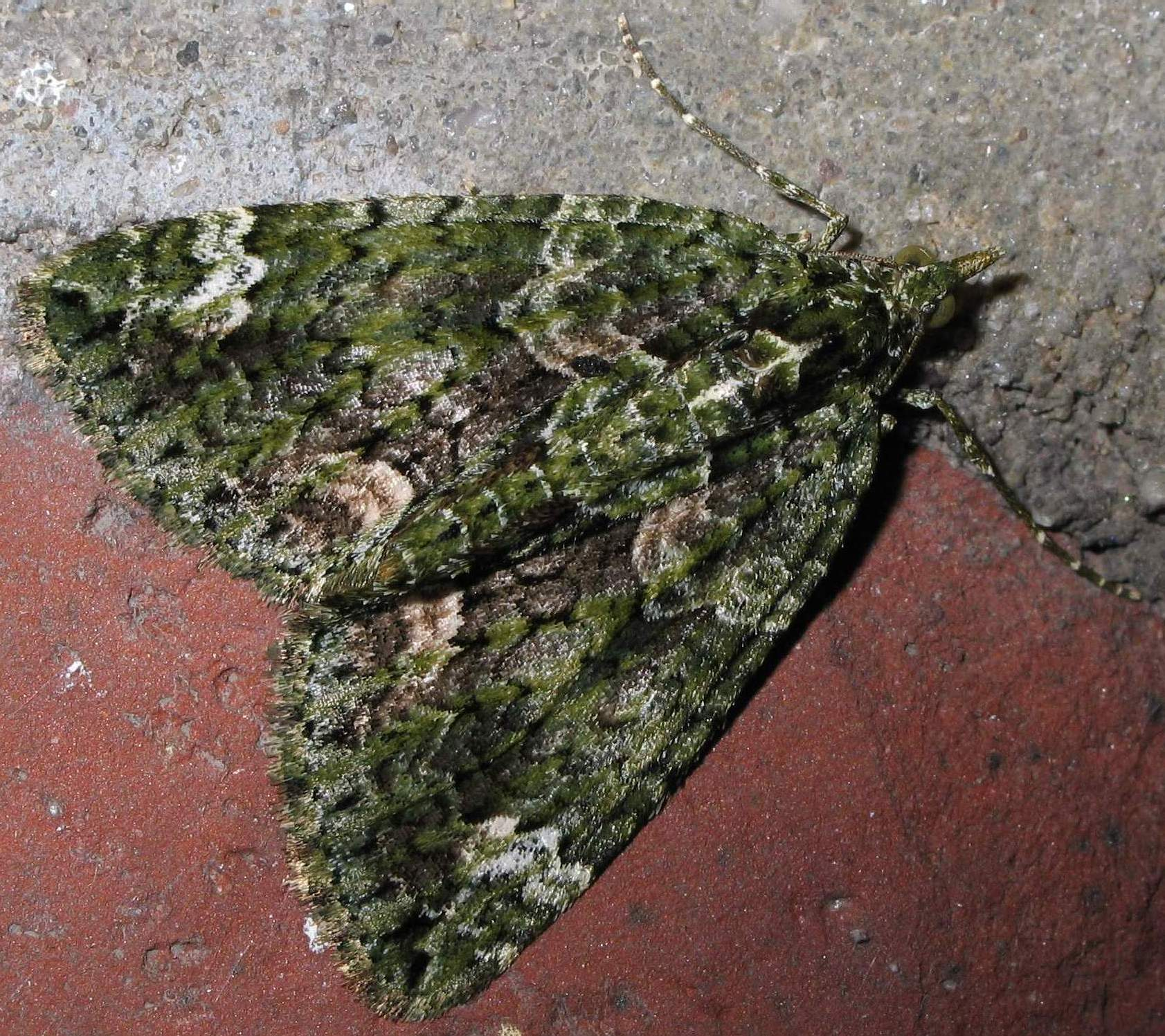
- A Red-green Carpet Chloroclysta siterata

Scientific classification
- Kingdom: Animalia
- Phylum: Arthropoda
- Clade: Pancrustacea
- Class: Insecta
- Order: Lepidoptera
- Family: Geometridae
- Tribe: Cidariini
- Genus: Chloroclysta; Hübner, [1825]

= Chloroclysta =

Genus of moths

Chloroclysta is a genus of moths in the family Geometridae erected by Jacob Hübner 1825.

== Species ==
- Chloroclysta concinnata (Stephens, 1831) – Arran carpet
- Chloroclysta guriata (Emich, 1873)
- Chloroclysta miata (Linnaeus, 1758) – autumn green carpet
- Chloroclysta siterata (Hufnagel, 1767) – red-green carpet
