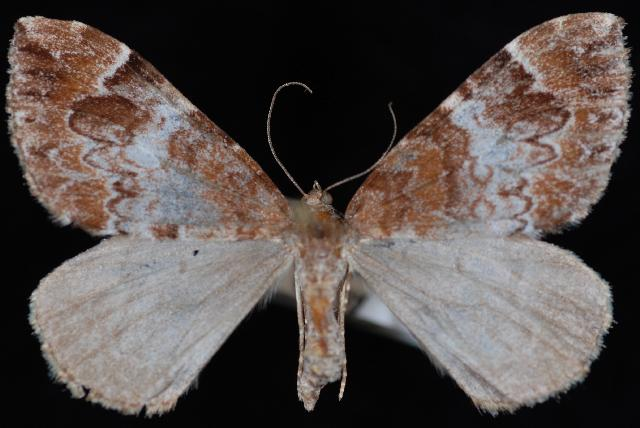

Scientific classification
- Kingdom: Animalia
- Phylum: Arthropoda
- Class: Insecta
- Order: Lepidoptera
- Family: Geometridae
- Tribe: Cidariini
- Genus: Dysstroma
- Species: D. sobria

Binomial name
- Dysstroma sobria Swett, 1917

= Dysstroma sobria =

Species of moth

Dysstroma sobria, the 10-spotted rhododendron moth, is a species of geometrid moth in the family Geometridae. It is found in North America.

The MONA or Hodges number for Dysstroma sobria is 7184.
