= Papestra quadrata =

Scientific classification
- Domain: Eukaryota
- Kingdom: Animalia
- Phylum: Arthropoda
- Class: Insecta
- Order: Lepidoptera
- Superfamily: Noctuoidea
- Family: Noctuidae
- Tribe: Hadenini
- Genus: Papestra
- Species: P. quadrata

Binomial name
- Papestra quadrata (Smith, 1891)

Synonyms
- Polia ingravis (Smith, 1895)

Species of moth

Papestra quadrata is a species of cutworm or dart moth in the family Noctuidae. It is found in North America.

The MONA or Hodges number for Papestra quadrata is 10310.

== Subspecies ==
These two subspecies belong to the species Papestra quadrata:

- Papestra quadrata ingravis Smith, 1895
- Papestra quadrata quadrata
