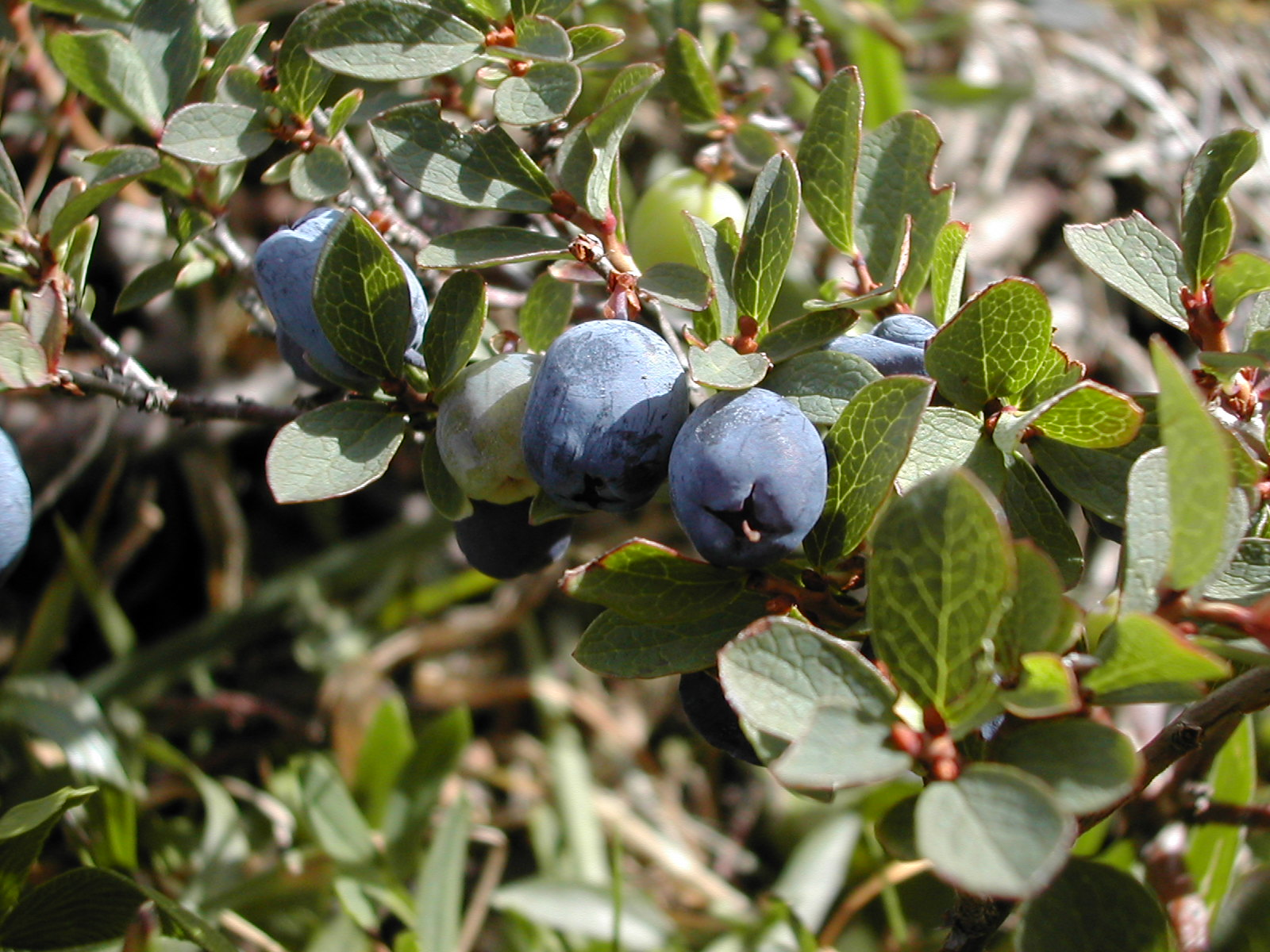

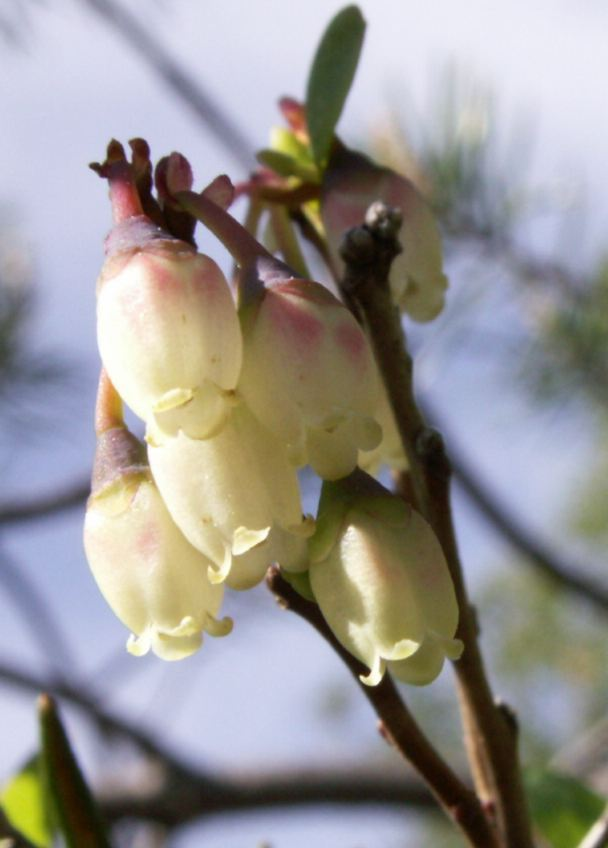

Conservation status
- Secure (NatureServe)

Scientific classification
- Kingdom: Plantae
- Clade: Embryophytes
- Clade: Tracheophytes
- Clade: Angiosperms
- Clade: Eudicots
- Clade: Asterids
- Order: Ericales
- Family: Ericaceae
- Genus: Vaccinium
- Species: V. uliginosum

Binomial name
- Vaccinium uliginosum L.

Synonyms
- Myrtillus grandis Bubani; Myrtillus uliginosus (L.) Drejer; Vaccinium gaultherioides Bigelow; Vaccinium occidentale A. Gray; Vaccinium pedris Holub; Vaccinium pubescens Wormsk. ex Hornem.; Vaccinium salicinum Cham. & Schltdl.

= Vaccinium uliginosum =

Berry and plant

Vaccinium uliginosum (bog bilberry, bog blueberry, alpine blueberry or western blueberry) is a Eurasian and North American flowering plant in the heath family. The berries are edible.

== Description ==
Vaccinium uliginosum is a small deciduous shrub growing to 10–75 centimetres (4–30 in) tall, rarely 1 metre (3 feet) tall, with brown stems (unlike the green stems of the closely related bilberry). The leaves are oval, 4–30 millimetres (1/8–1 1/8 in) long and 2–15 mm (1/16–9/16 in) wide, blue-green with pale net-like veins, with a smooth margin and rounded apex.

The flowers are pendulous, urn-shaped, pale pink, 4–6 mm (3/16–1/4 in) long, produced in mid-spring. The fruit is a dark blue-black berry 5–8 mm (3/16–5/16 in) in diameter, with sweet white flesh, ripe in late summer. Cytology is 2n = 24. Its fruit persists for an average of 26.1 days, and bears an average of 24.7 seeds per fruit. The fruit averages 86.8% water, with the dry weight including 38.4% carbohydrates and 3.9% lipids.

== Subspecies ==
Three subspecies and one variety are accepted by the Plants of the World Online (POWO) database, but not all authorities distinguish them. Only the nominate subspecies of V. uliginosum subsp. uliginosum is relatively widely accepted.

- Vaccinium uliginosum var. japonicum T.Yamaz. — Japan
- Vaccinium uliginosum subsp. nanum (Boiss.) Rivas Mart., A.Asensi, Molero Mesa & F.Valle — Spain (Sierra Nevada)
- Vaccinium uliginosum subsp. uliginosum — throughout most of the range of the species
- Vaccinium uliginosum subsp. vulcanorum (Kom.) Alsos & Elven — northeast Asia

A fourth subspecies Vaccinium uliginosum subsp. microphyllum Lange is sometimes accepted for Arctic plants; POWO treat it as a synonym of the nominate subspecies.

== Distribution and habitat ==
The plant is native to cool temperate regions of the Northern Hemisphere, at low altitudes in the Arctic, Baltics, and at high altitudes south to the Pyrenees, the Alps, and the Caucasus in Europe, the mountains of Mongolia, northern China, the Korean Peninsula and central Japan in Asia, and the Sierra Nevada in California and the Rocky Mountains in Utah in North America.

It grows on wet acidic soils on heathland, moorland, tundra, and in the understory of coniferous forests, from sea level in the Arctic, up to 3,400 m (11,200 ft) altitude in the south of the range. It is also occasionally found on calcareous soils on mountain ledges.

V. uliginosum can survive long, severe climatic oscillations.

== Uses ==
The berries can be eaten raw or cooked, used to make jelly or pies, or dried to make pemmican.

In Korean cuisine, bog bilberry is used to make infused liquor (Deuljjuk-sul).

== Gallery ==
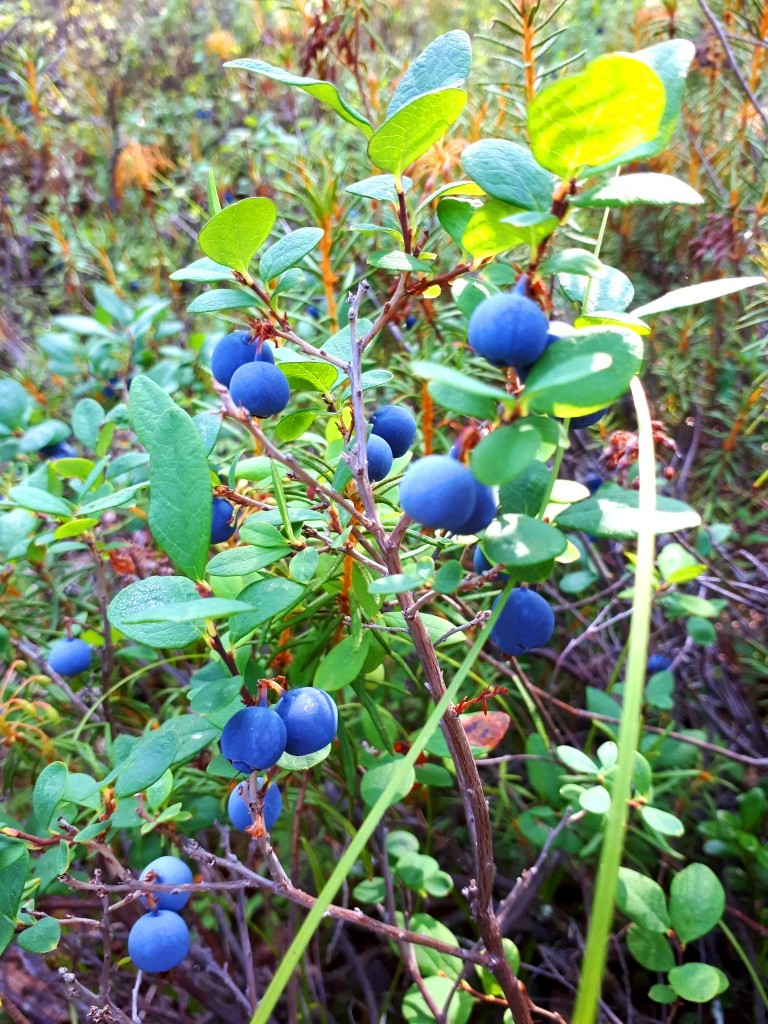
Bog bilberries on branches

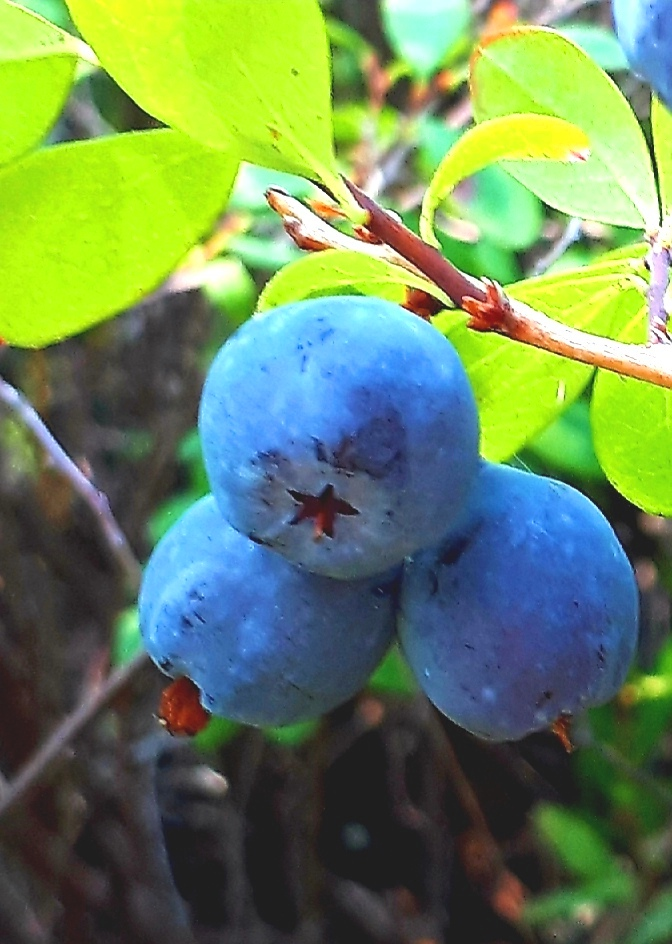
Close-up of bog bilberries in Eastern Siberia

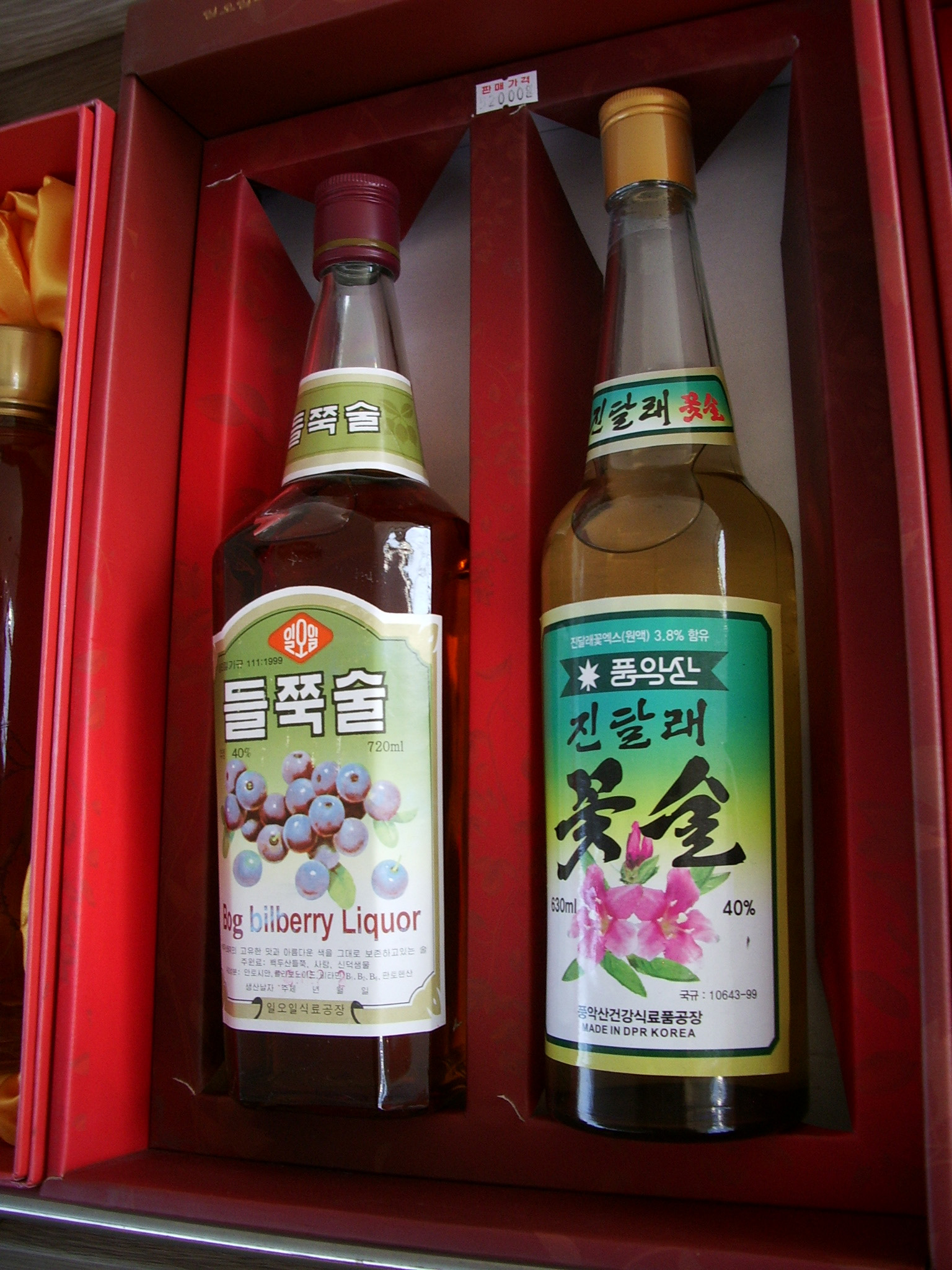
Bog bilberry liquor (left) produced in North Korea
