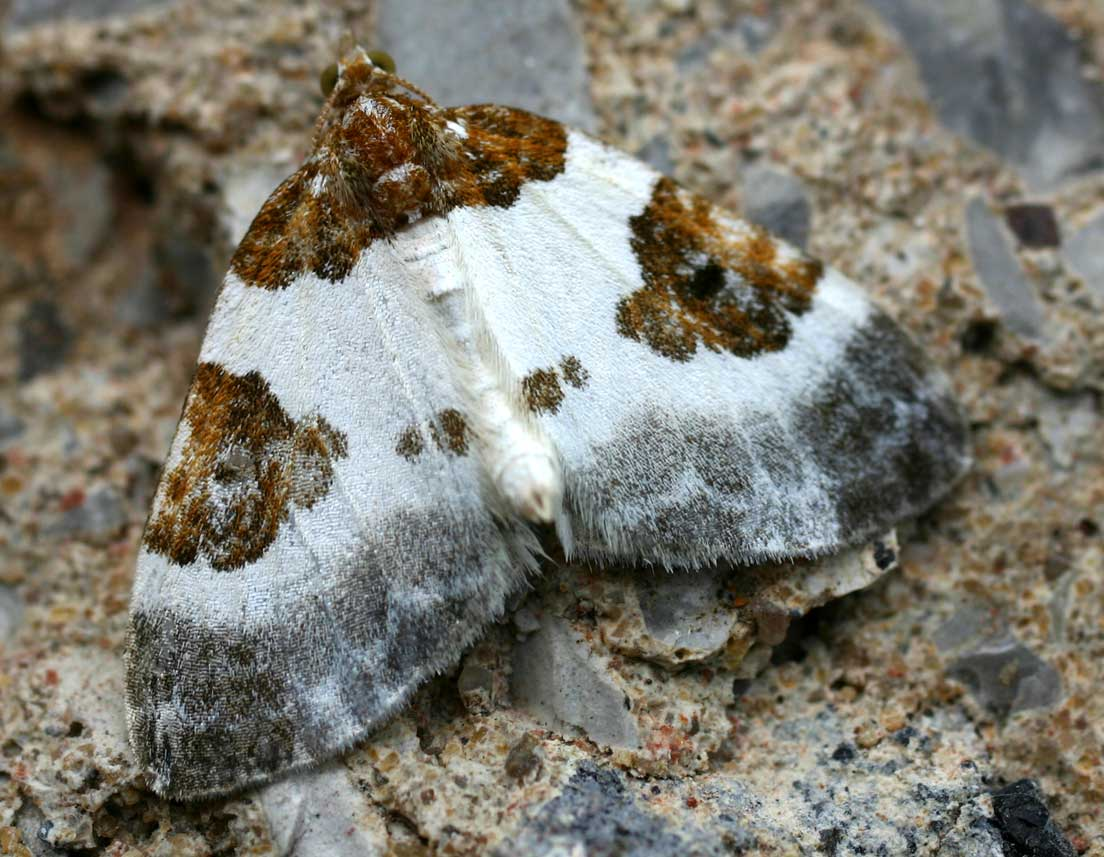
- Blue-bordered carpet (Plemyria rubiginata)

Scientific classification
- Kingdom: Animalia
- Phylum: Arthropoda
- Clade: Pancrustacea
- Class: Insecta
- Order: Lepidoptera
- Family: Geometridae
- Subfamily: Larentiinae
- Tribe: Cidariini; Duponchel, 1845

Genera
- About 35; see text

Synonyms
- Cidarites Duponchel, 1845; Therinae Pierce, 1914; Therini Pierce, 1914

= Cidariini =

Tribe of moths

The Cidariini are the largest tribe of geometer moths in the subfamily Larentiinae (possibly a distinct family). The Cidariini include many of the species known as "carpets" or, ambiguously, "carpet moths" (most other "carpets" are in the Xanthorhoini), and are among the few geometer moths that have been subject to fairly comprehensive cladistic study of their phylogeny. The tribe was described by Philogène Auguste Joseph Duponchel in 1845.

== Genera ==
As several larentiine genera have not yet been assigned to a tribe, the genus list is still preliminary; for example the genus Almeria may well belong in the Cidariini. Several well-known species are also listed:

- Antepirrhoe
- Callabraxas
- Calostigiodes
- Chloroclysta
  - Red-green carpet, Chloroclysta siterata
  - Common marbled carpet, Chloroclysta truncata (sometimes in Dysstroma)
- Cidaria
  - Barred yellow, Cidaria fulvata
- Colostygia
  - Green carpet, Colostygia pectinataria
- Cosmorhoe
  - Purple bar, Cosmorhoe ocellata
- Costicoma
- Diathera
- Dysstroma
- Ecliptopera
  - Ecliptopera capitata
  - Small phoenix, Ecliptopera silaceata
- Electrophaes
- Eulithis
  - Spinach, Eulithis mellinata
  - Northern spinach, Eulithis populata
  - Northwest Phoenix, Eulithis xylina
  - Phoenix, Eulithis prunata
  - Barred straw, Eulithis pyraliata (sometimes in Gandaritis)
- Eustroma
- Evecliptopera
- Fascilunaria
- Gandaritis
- Heterothera
- Hysterura
- Lampropteryx
- Lobogonodes
- Nebula
- Paradysstroma
- Pennithera
- Plemyria
  - Blue-bordered carpet, Plemyria rubiginata
- Pljushtchia
- Polythrena
- Praethera
- Pseudodysstroma
- Sibatania
- Thera
- Trichobaptria
- Trichodezia
- Xenortholitha
