= Calostigiodes =

Scientific classification
- Kingdom: Animalia
- Phylum: Arthropoda
- Class: Insecta
- Order: Lepidoptera
- Family: Geometridae
- Tribe: Cidariini
- Genus: Calostigiodes; Aubert, 1955
- Species: C. uncinatus

Binomial name
- Calostigiodes uncinatus (Püngeler, 1900)

Genus of moths

Calostigiodes is a monotypic moth genus in the family Geometridae erected by Jacques Aubert in 1955. Its only species, Calostigiodes uncinatus, described by Rudolf Püngeler in 1900, was found at Qinghai Lake (then called Koko Nor) in China.
