= Trichodezia albovittata =

White-striped black moth
- Emerald Lake, British Columbia

Scientific classification
- Kingdom: Animalia
- Phylum: Arthropoda
- Clade: Pancrustacea
- Class: Insecta
- Order: Lepidoptera
- Family: Geometridae
- Genus: Trichodezia
- Species: T. albovittata

Binomial name
- Trichodezia albovittata (Guenée, 1857)

Synonyms
- Odezia albovittata Guenée, 1857; Melanippe propriaria Walker, 1862; Trichodezia propriaria (Walker, 1862); Melanippe reciprocata Walker, 1862; Trichodezia reciprocata (Walker, 1862)

Species of moth

Trichodezia albovittata, the white-striped black moth, is a moth in the family Geometridae. It is found from Alaska to Newfoundland and Labrador, south in the east to North Carolina and in the west to northern California.

The wingspan is 20–25 mm. Adults are on wing from April to September.

The larvae feed on Impatiens species.

== Subspecies ==
- Trichodezia albovittata albovittata
- Trichodezia albovittata tenuifasciata Barnes & McDunnough, 1917
