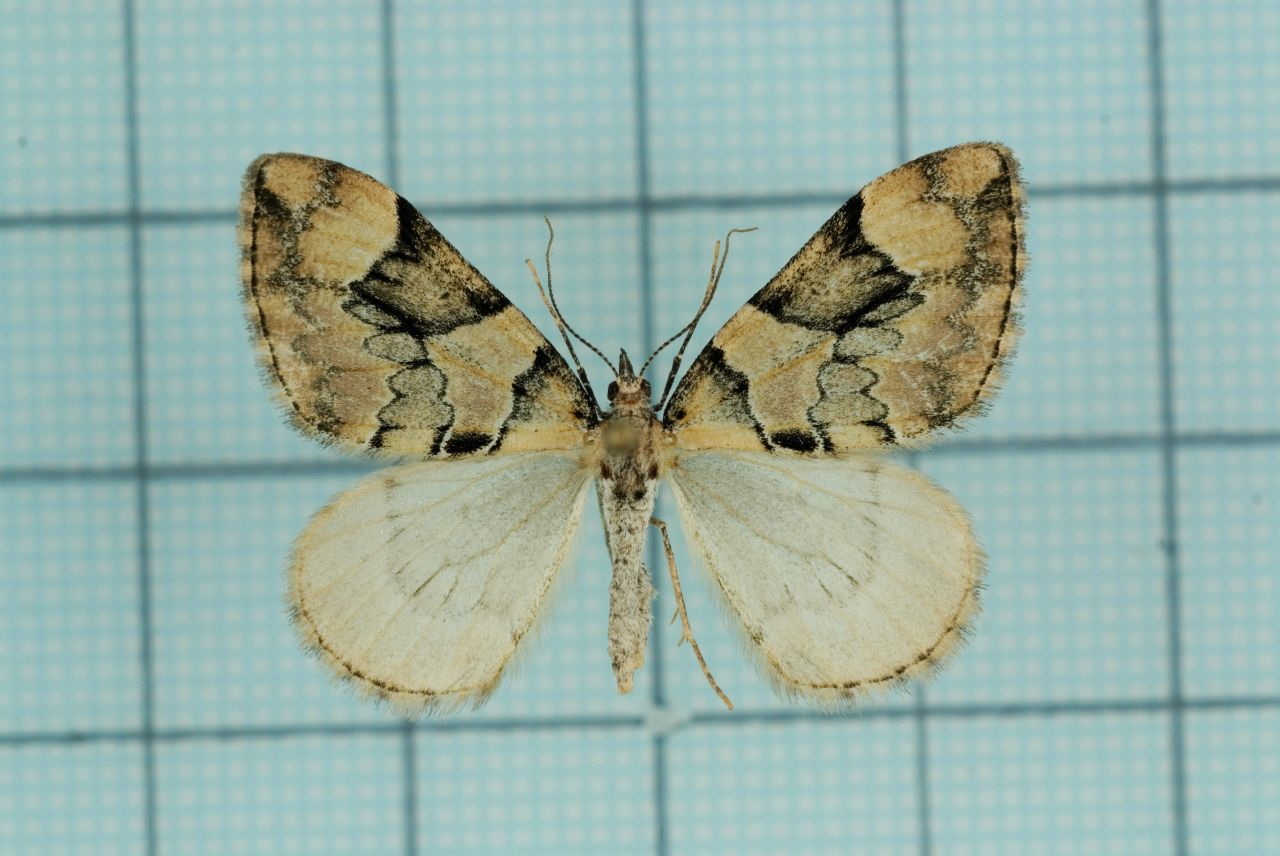

Scientific classification
- Kingdom: Animalia
- Phylum: Arthropoda
- Class: Insecta
- Order: Lepidoptera
- Family: Geometridae
- Genus: Pennithera
- Species: P. manifesta

Binomial name
- Pennithera manifesta Inoue, 1986

= Pennithera manifesta =

Species of moth

Pennithera manifesta is a species of moth of the family Noctuidae. It is found in Taiwan.
