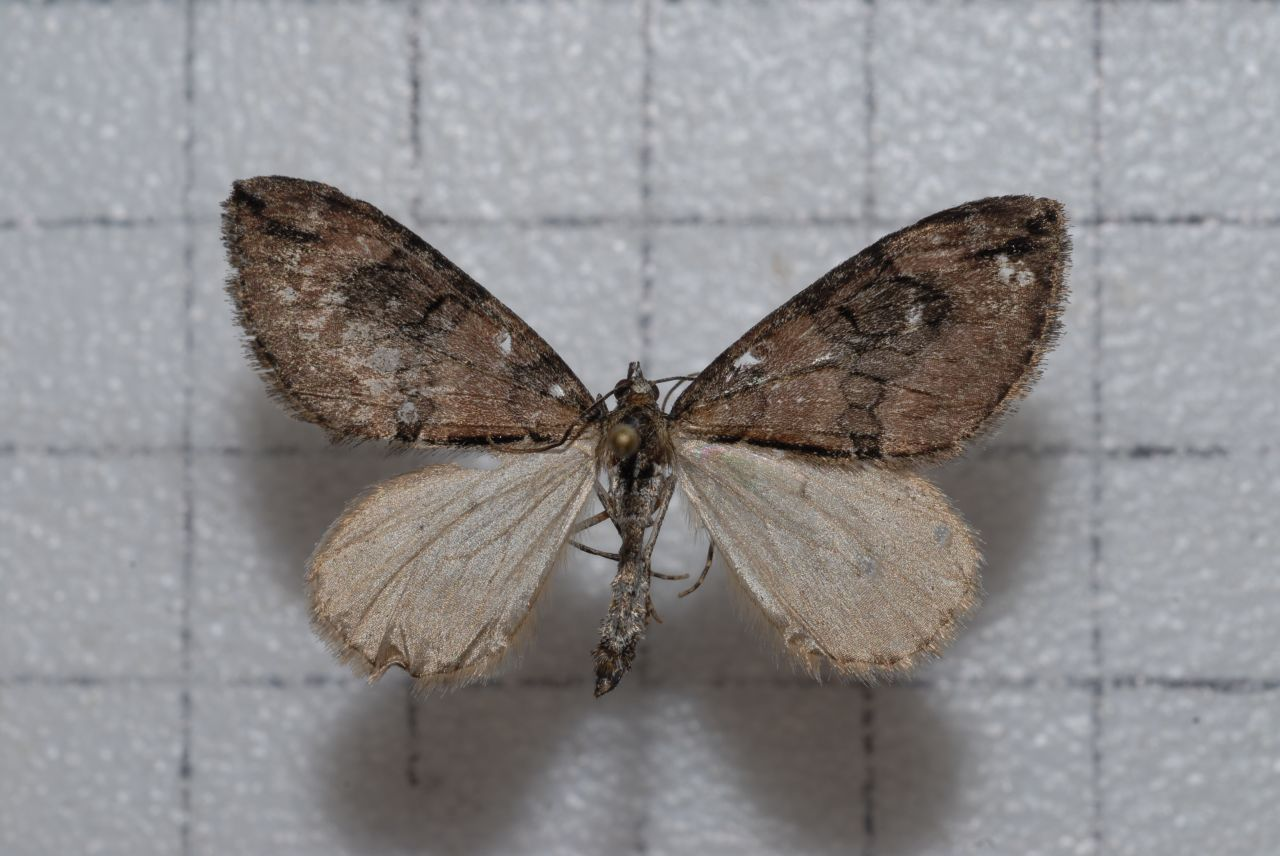

Scientific classification
- Kingdom: Animalia
- Phylum: Arthropoda
- Class: Insecta
- Order: Lepidoptera
- Family: Geometridae
- Genus: Heterothera
- Species: H. sororcula

Binomial name
- Heterothera sororcula (Bastelberger, 1909)

Synonyms
- Thera sororcula Bastelberger, 1909

= Heterothera sororcula =

Species of moth

Heterothera sororcula is a moth in the family Geometridae first described by Max Bastelberger in 1909. It is found in Taiwan.
