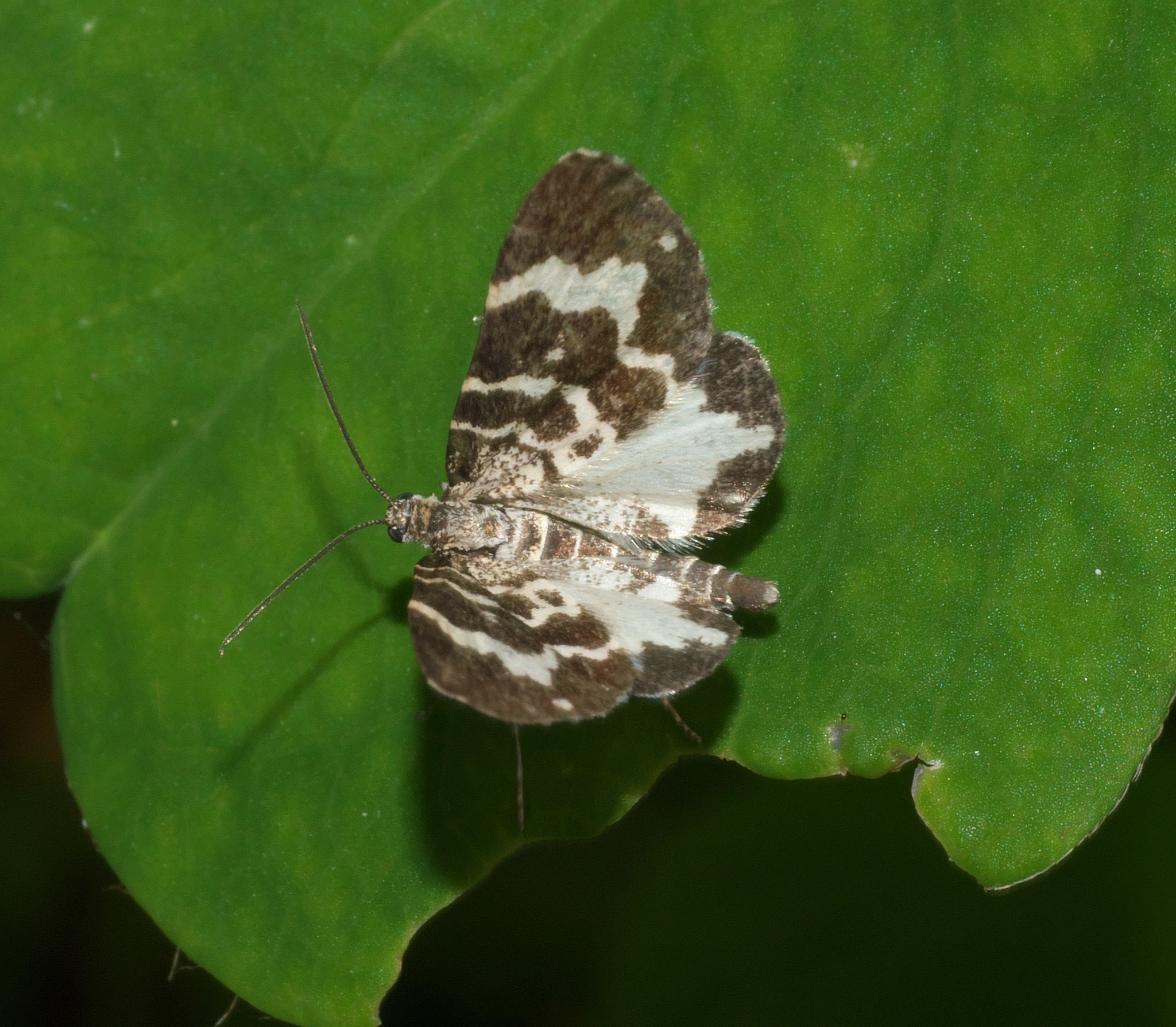
- Trichodezia californiata, Washington

Scientific classification
- Kingdom: Animalia
- Phylum: Arthropoda
- Clade: Pancrustacea
- Class: Insecta
- Order: Lepidoptera
- Family: Geometridae
- Genus: Trichodezia
- Species: T. californiata

Binomial name
- Trichodezia californiata (Packard, 1871)

Synonyms
- Baptria californiata Packard, 1871

= Trichodezia californiata =

Species of moth

Trichodezia californiata is a moth in the family Geometridae. It is found in western North America, from Washington and Oregon to California.
