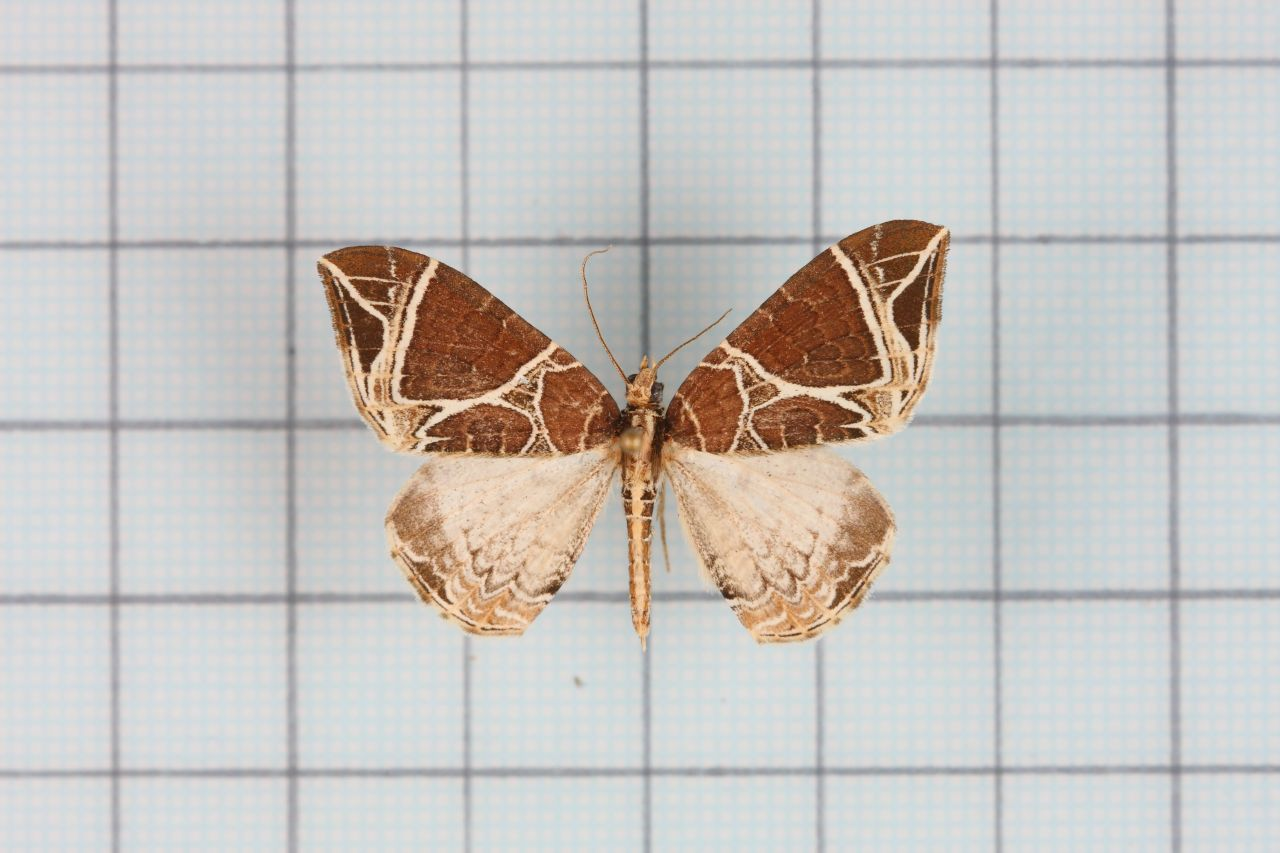

Scientific classification
- Kingdom: Animalia
- Phylum: Arthropoda
- Clade: Pancrustacea
- Class: Insecta
- Order: Lepidoptera
- Family: Geometridae
- Genus: Ecliptopera
- Species: E. benigna

Binomial name
- Ecliptopera benigna (L. B. Prout, 1914)

Synonyms
- Euphyia benigna Prout, 1914

= Ecliptopera benigna =

Species of moth

Ecliptopera benigna is a moth of the family Geometridae first described by Louis Beethoven Prout in 1914. It is found in Taiwan.
