= Praethera =

Scientific classification
- Kingdom: Animalia
- Phylum: Arthropoda
- Class: Insecta
- Order: Lepidoptera
- Family: Geometridae
- Tribe: Cidariini
- Genus: Praethera; Viidalepp, 1980

Genus of moths

Praethera is a genus of moths in the family Geometridae erected by Jaan Viidalepp in 1980.

== Species ==
- Praethera anomala (Inoue, 1954)
- Praethera praefecta (Prout, 1914)
