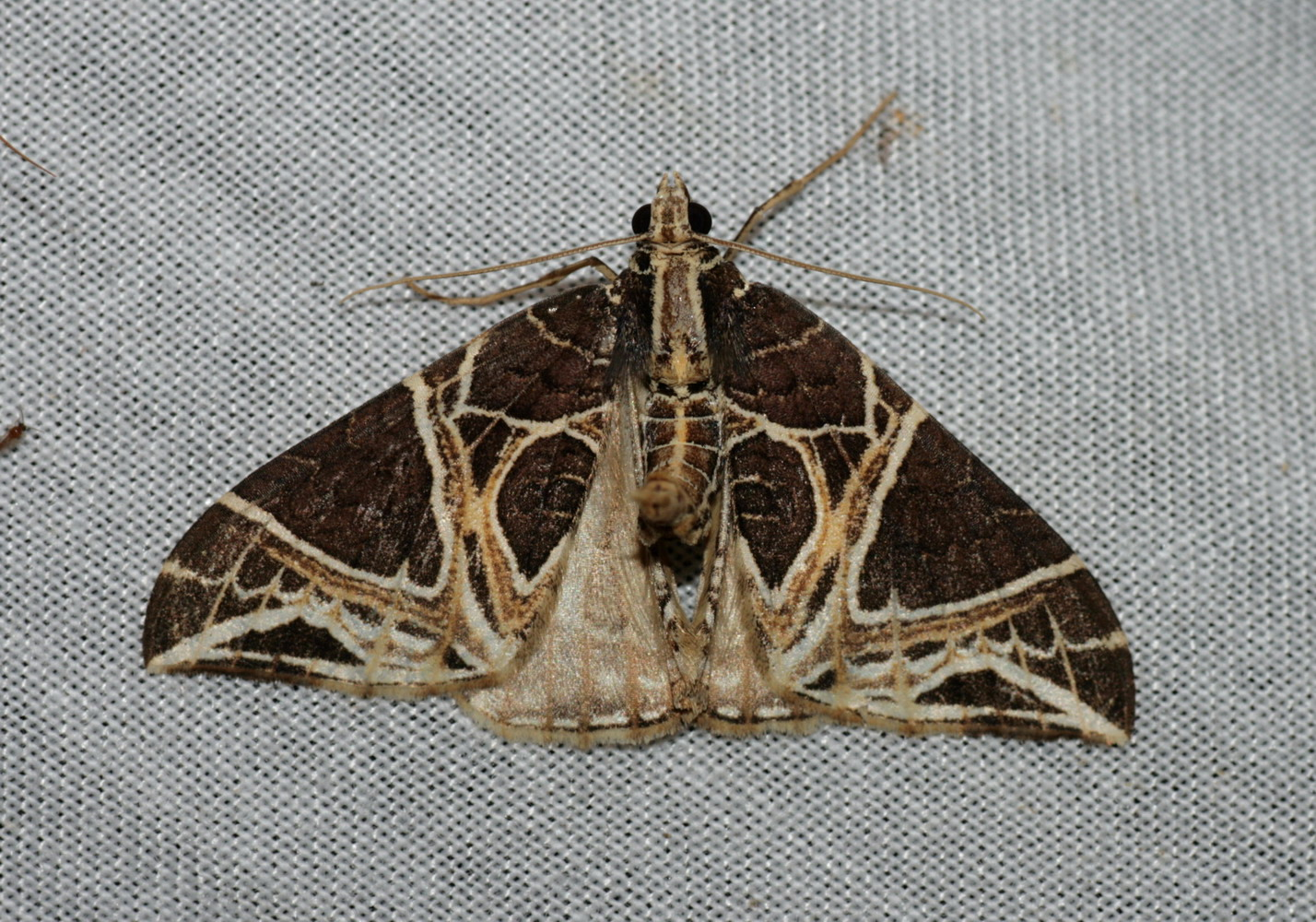

Scientific classification
- Domain: Eukaryota
- Kingdom: Animalia
- Phylum: Arthropoda
- Class: Insecta
- Order: Lepidoptera
- Family: Geometridae
- Genus: Ecliptopera
- Species: E. rectilinea

Binomial name
- Ecliptopera rectilinea Warren, 1894

= Ecliptopera rectilinea =

Species of moth

Ecliptopera rectilinea is a species of moth of the family Geometridae first described by William Warren in 1894. It is found in the north-eastern parts of the Himalayas, Taiwan, northern Thailand, Peninsular Malaysia, Borneo, Bali, Sumbawa and Sulawesi.

== Subspecies ==
- Ecliptopera rectilinear rectilinea
- Ecliptopera rectilinea kanshinensis (north-eastern parts of the Himalayas, Taiwan)
- Ecliptopera rectilinea impingens (Peninsular Malaysia, Borneo, Bali, Sumbawa)
- Ecliptopera rectilinea fortis (Sulawesi)
