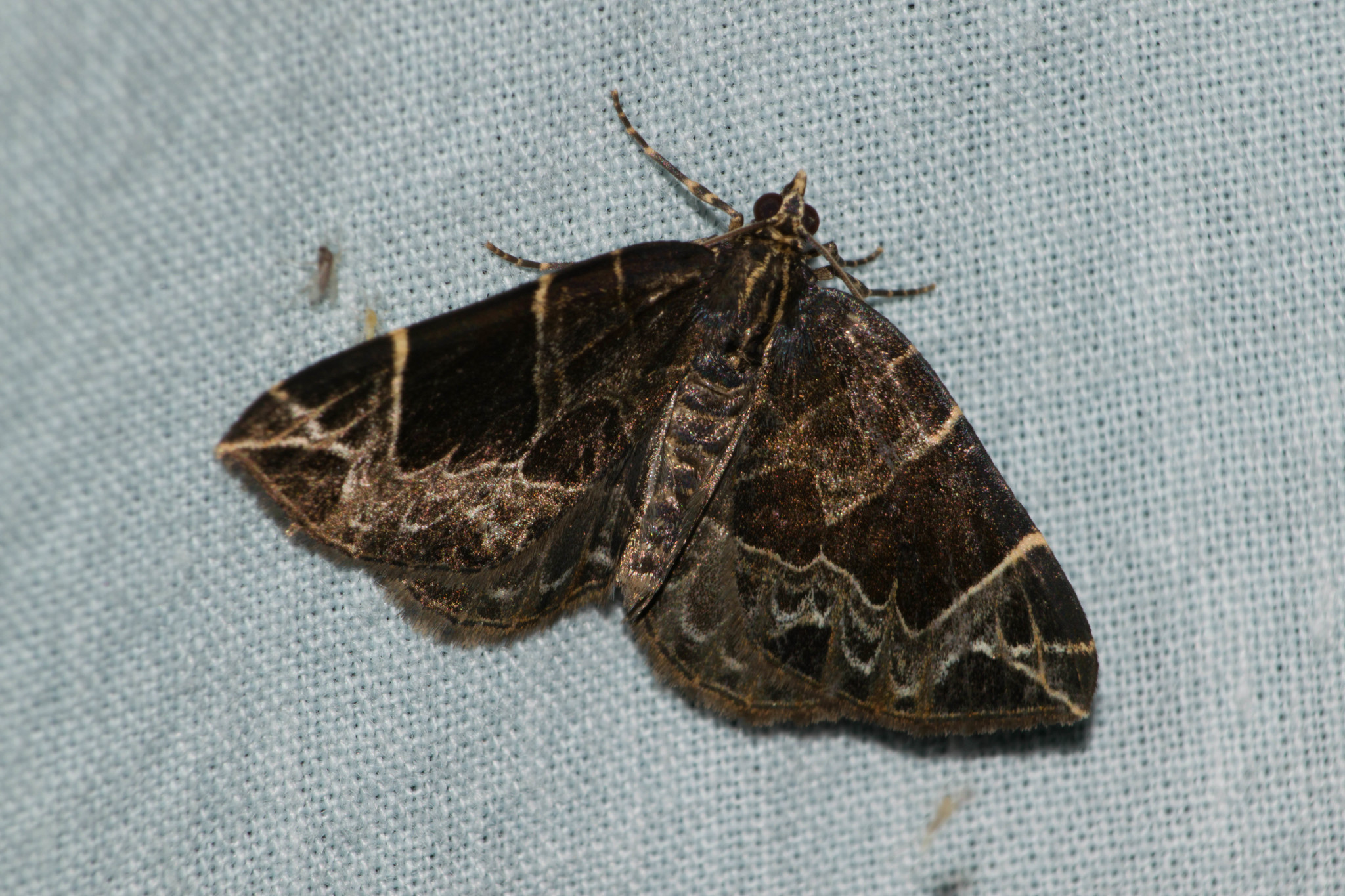
- Gandaritis atricolorata
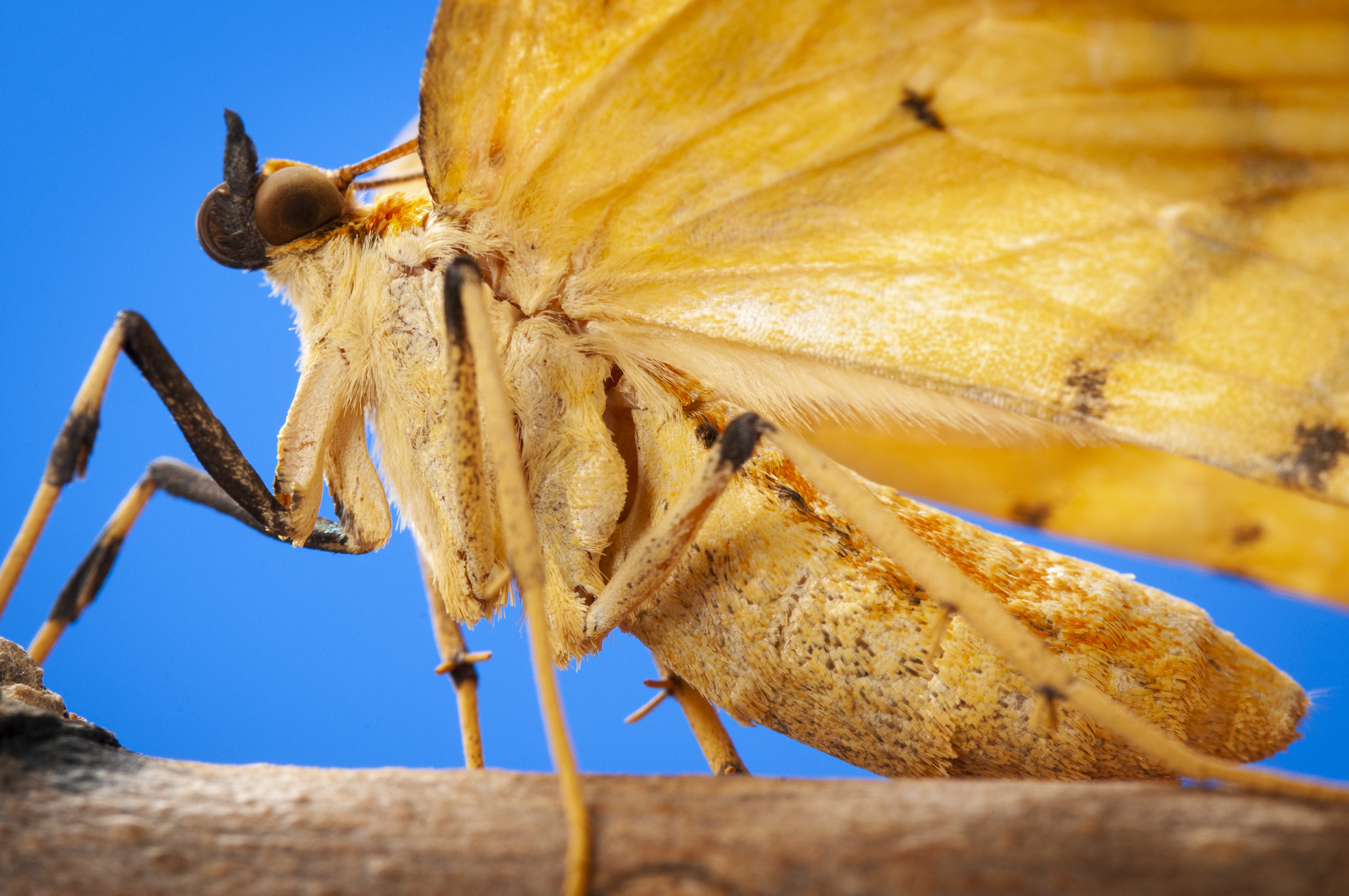
- Gandaritis fixsen, Adult, South Korea

Scientific classification
- Kingdom: Animalia
- Phylum: Arthropoda
- Clade: Pancrustacea
- Class: Insecta
- Order: Lepidoptera
- Family: Geometridae
- Tribe: Cidariini
- Genus: Gandaritis; Moore, [1868]

= Gandaritis =

Genus of moths

Gandaritis is a genus of moths in the family Geometridae described by Frederic Moore in 1868.

== Species ==
- Gandaritis agnes (Butler, 1878)
- Gandaritis atricolorata (Grote & Robinson, 1866)
- Gandaritis evanescens (Butler, 1881)
- Gandaritis fixseni (Bremer, 1864)
- Gandaritis flavata Moore, [1868]
- Gandaritis flavescens (Xue, 1992)
- Gandaritis flavomacularis (Leech, 1897)
- Gandaritis impleta (Xue, 1990)
- Gandaritis maculata (C. Swinhoe, 1894)
- Gandaritis octoscripta (Wileman, 1912)
- Gandaritis placida (Butler, 1878)
- Gandaritis postalba (Wileman, 1920)
- Gandaritis powellata (Ferguson & Choi)
- Gandaritis pseudolargetaui (Wehrli, 1933)
- Gandaritis pyraliata (Denis & Schiffermüller, 1775)
- Gandaritis sinicaria (Leech, 1897)
- Gandaritis subalba (Prout, 1941)
- Gandaritis tricedista (Prout, 1938)
- Gandaritis tristis (Sterneck, 1928)
- Gandaritis whitelyi (Butler, 1878)

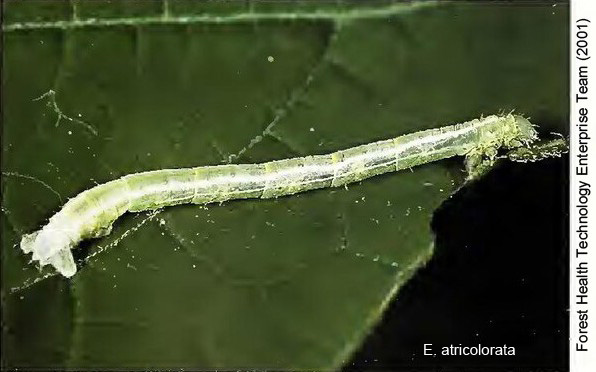
Gandaritis atricolorata caterpillar
