= Costicoma =

Scientific classification
- Domain: Eukaryota
- Kingdom: Animalia
- Phylum: Arthropoda
- Class: Insecta
- Order: Lepidoptera
- Family: Geometridae
- Tribe: Cidariini
- Genus: Costicoma; Choi, 2000
- Species: C. exangulata

Binomial name
- Costicoma exangulata (Warren, 1909)

Synonyms
- Perizoma exangulata Warren, 1909; Cidaria exangulata; Thera exangulata; Heterothera exangulata

Genus of moths

Costicoma is a genus of moths in the family Geometridae. It consists of only one species, Costicoma exangulata, which is found in northern India.
