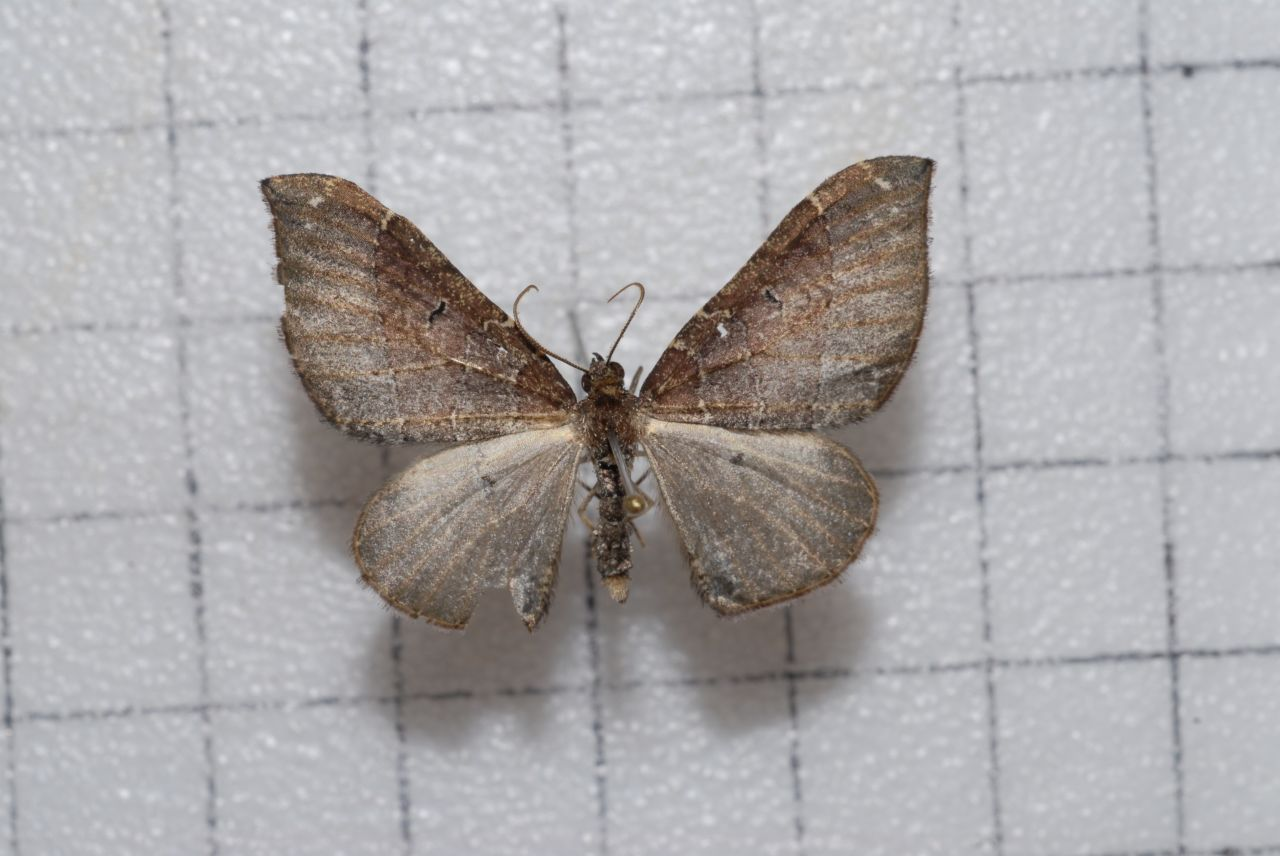
- Xenortholitha corioidea

Scientific classification
- Kingdom: Animalia
- Phylum: Arthropoda
- Class: Insecta
- Order: Lepidoptera
- Family: Geometridae
- Tribe: Cidariini
- Genus: Xenortholitha; Inoue, 1944

= Xenortholitha =

Genus of moths

Xenortholitha is a genus of moths in the family Geometridae erected by Inoue in 1944.

== Species ==
- Xenortholitha corioidea (Bastelberger, 1911)
- Xenortholitha dicaea (Prout, 1924)
- Xenortholitha euthygramma (Wehrli, 1924)
- Xenortholitha exacra (Wehrli, 1931)
- Xenortholitha extrastrenua (Wehrli, 1931)
- Xenortholitha falcata Yazaki, 1993
- Xenortholitha latifusata (Walker, 1862)
- Xenortholitha propinguata (Kollar, 1844)
