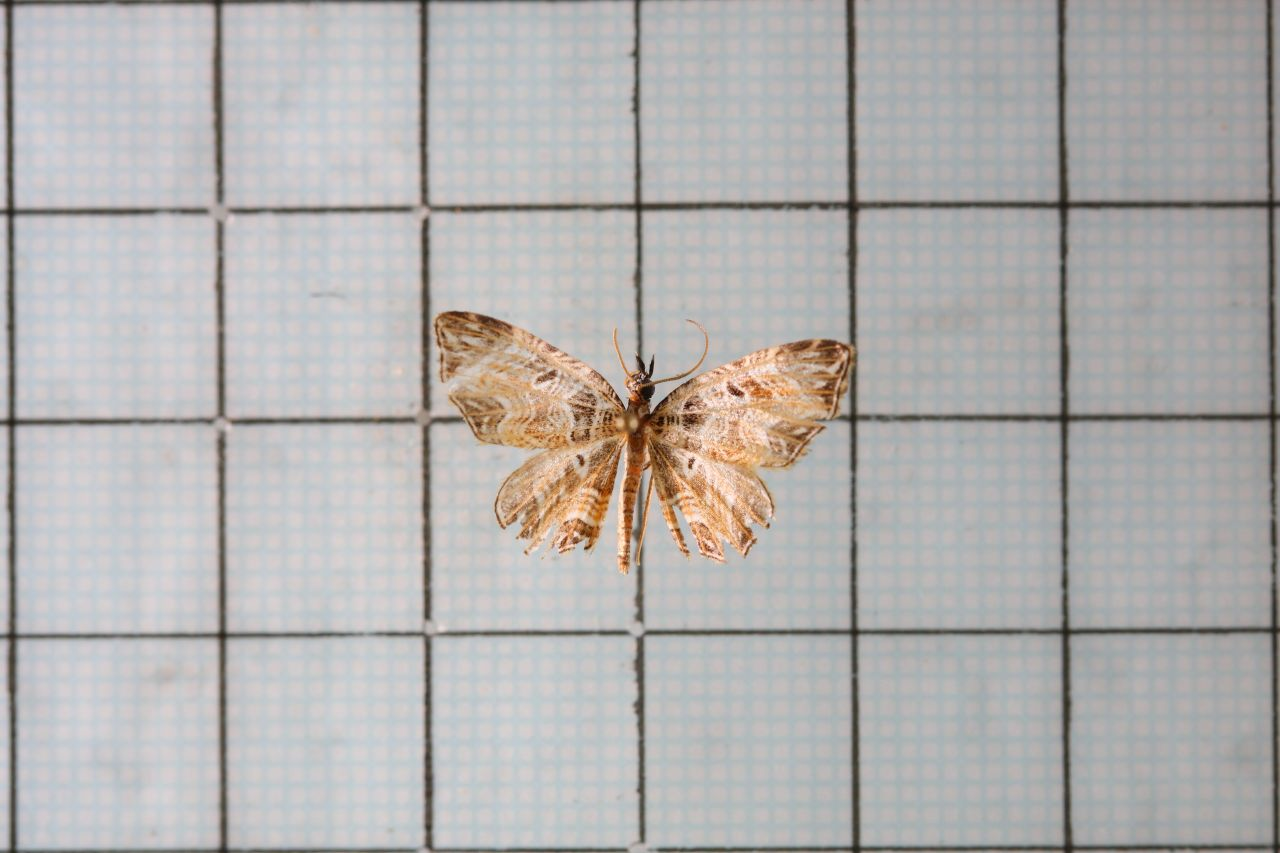

Scientific classification
- Kingdom: Animalia
- Phylum: Arthropoda
- Class: Insecta
- Order: Lepidoptera
- Family: Geometridae
- Genus: Lobogonodes
- Species: L. taiwana

Binomial name
- Lobogonodes taiwana (Wileman & South, 1917)

Synonyms
- Lygris taiwana Wileman & South, 1917

= Lobogonodes taiwana =

Species of moth

Lobogonodes taiwana is a moth in the family Geometridae first described by Alfred Ernest Wileman and Richard South in 1917. It is found in Taiwan.
