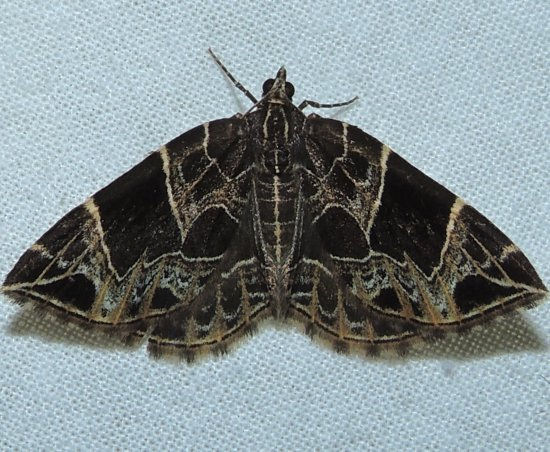

Scientific classification
- Kingdom: Animalia
- Phylum: Arthropoda
- Class: Insecta
- Order: Lepidoptera
- Family: Geometridae
- Genus: Ecliptopera
- Species: E. atricolorata

Binomial name
- Ecliptopera atricolorata (Grote & Robinson, 1867)

Synonyms
- Cidaria atricolorata Grote & Robinson, 1867

= Ecliptopera atricolorata =

Dark-banded geometer moth

Species of moth

Ecliptopera atricolorata, the dark-banded geometer moth, is a moth of the family Geometridae. It is found in North America, where it has been recorded from Alabama, Arkansas, Florida, Georgia, Indiana, Kentucky, Maryland, Mississippi, North Carolina, Ohio, Pennsylvania, South Carolina, Tennessee, Virginia and West Virginia.

The wingspan is 28–32 mm (1.1–1.3 in). Adults have been recorded on wing from April to September, with most records from June and July.
