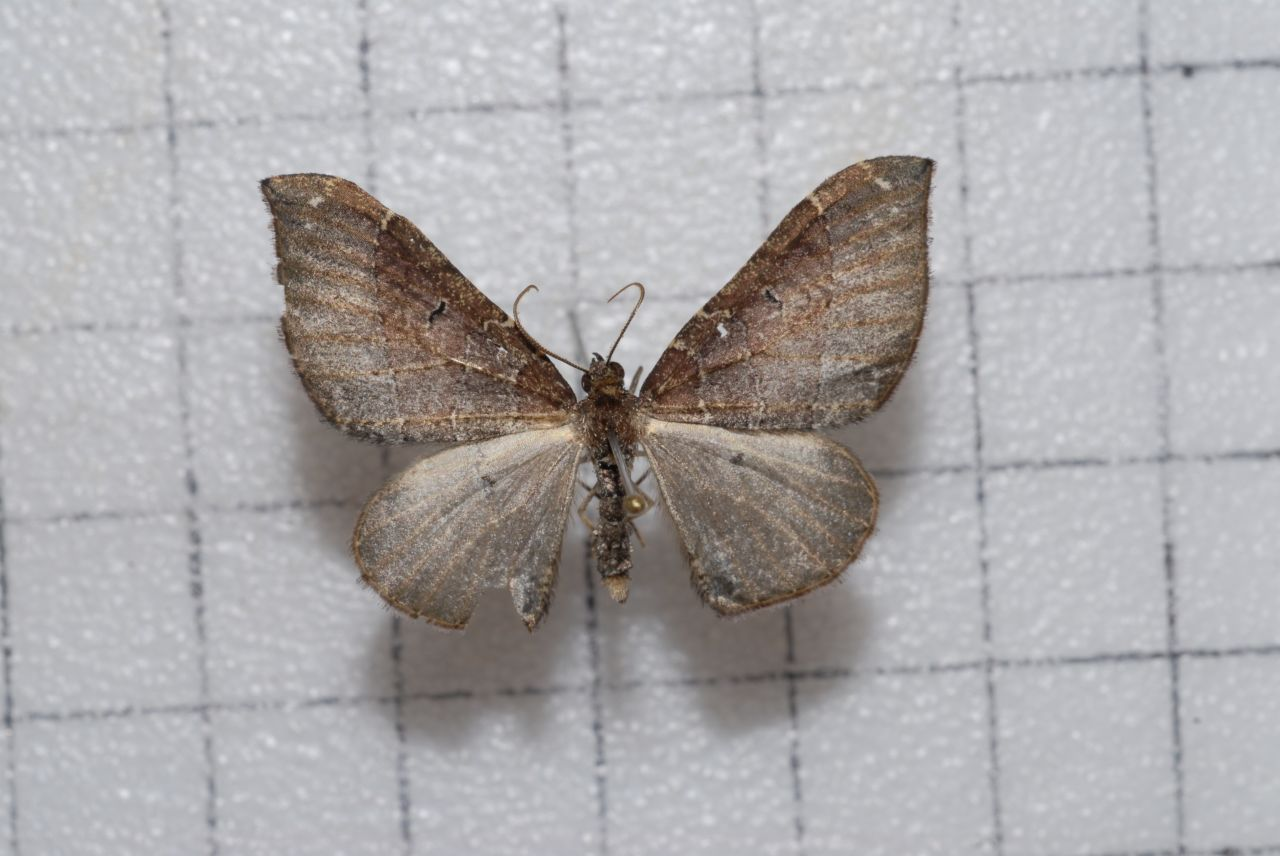

Scientific classification
- Kingdom: Animalia
- Phylum: Arthropoda
- Class: Insecta
- Order: Lepidoptera
- Family: Geometridae
- Genus: Xenortholitha
- Species: X. corioidea

Binomial name
- Xenortholitha corioidea (Bastelberger, 1911)

Synonyms
- Ortholitha corioidea Bastelberger, 1911

= Xenortholitha corioidea =

Species of moth

Xenortholitha corioidea is a species of moth of the family Geometridae. It is found in Taiwan.

The wingspan is 34–38 mm.
