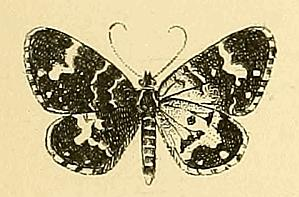

Scientific classification
- Kingdom: Animalia
- Phylum: Arthropoda
- Class: Insecta
- Order: Lepidoptera
- Family: Geometridae
- Genus: Trichodezia
- Species: T. haberhaueri

Binomial name
- Trichodezia haberhaueri (Lederer, 1864)

Synonyms
- Baptria haberhaueri Lederer, 1864; Neodezia haberhaueri; Polythrena ledereri Staudinger 1901

= Trichodezia haberhaueri =

Species of moth

Trichodezia haberhaueri is a moth in the family Geometridae. It is found in Russia (the Russian plain and the Caucasus), Georgia and Turkey.
