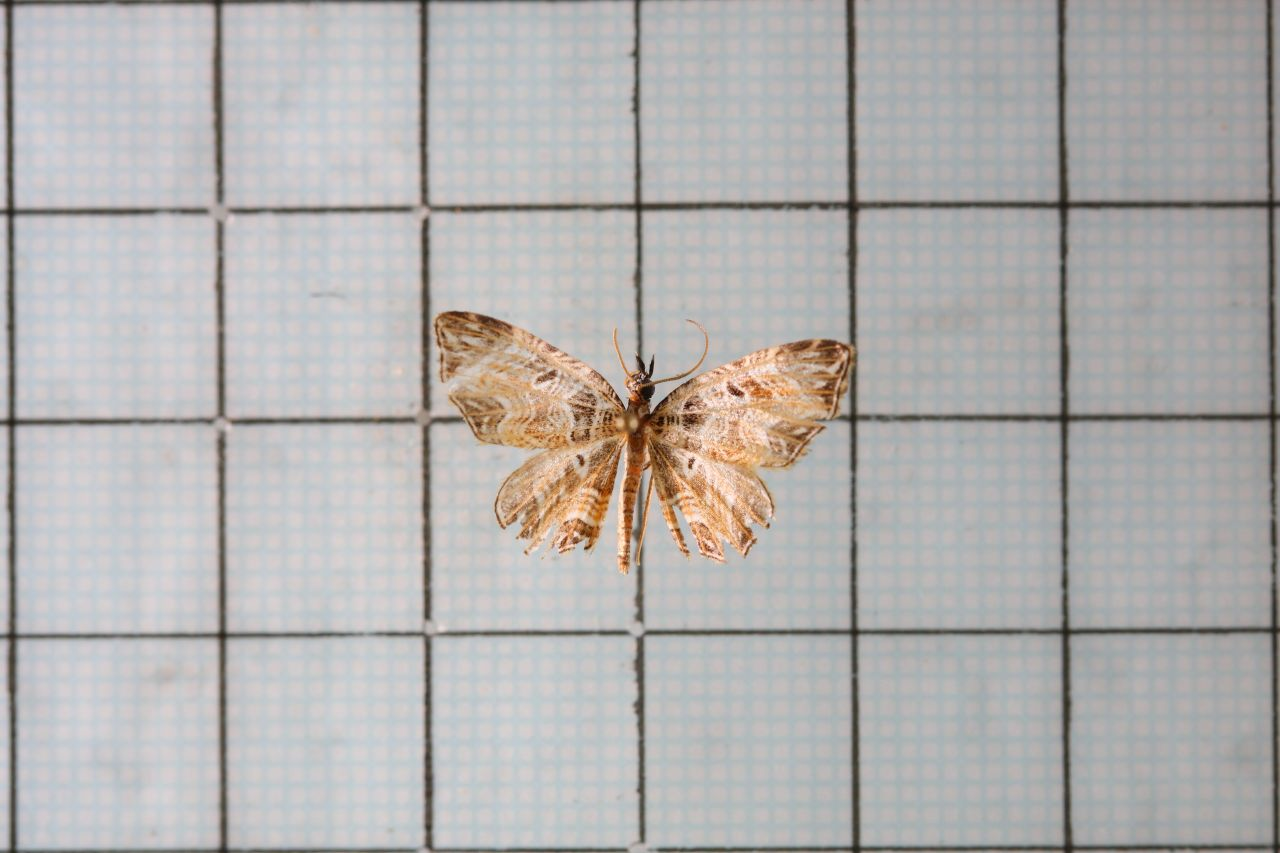
- Lobogonodes taiwana

Scientific classification
- Domain: Eukaryota
- Kingdom: Animalia
- Phylum: Arthropoda
- Class: Insecta
- Order: Lepidoptera
- Family: Geometridae
- Tribe: Cidariini
- Genus: Lobogonodes; Bastelberger, 1909

Synonyms
- Microlygris Prout, 1914

= Lobogonodes =

Genus of moths

Lobogonodes is a genus of moths in the family Geometridae erected by Max Bastelberger in 1909.

== Species ==
- Lobogonodes complicata (Butler, 1879)
- Lobogonodes erectaria (Leech, 1897)
- Lobogonodes multistriata (Butler, 1889)
- Lobogonodes permarmorata (Bastelberger, 1909)
- Lobogonodes porphyriata (Moore, 1888)
- Lobogonodes taiwana (Wileman & South, 1917)
