= Ecliptopera dissecta =

Scientific classification
- Domain: Eukaryota
- Kingdom: Animalia
- Phylum: Arthropoda
- Class: Insecta
- Order: Lepidoptera
- Family: Geometridae
- Genus: Ecliptopera
- Species: E. dissecta

Binomial name
- Ecliptopera dissecta Moore, 1887

Species of moth

Ecliptopera dissecta is a moth of the family Geometridae.
