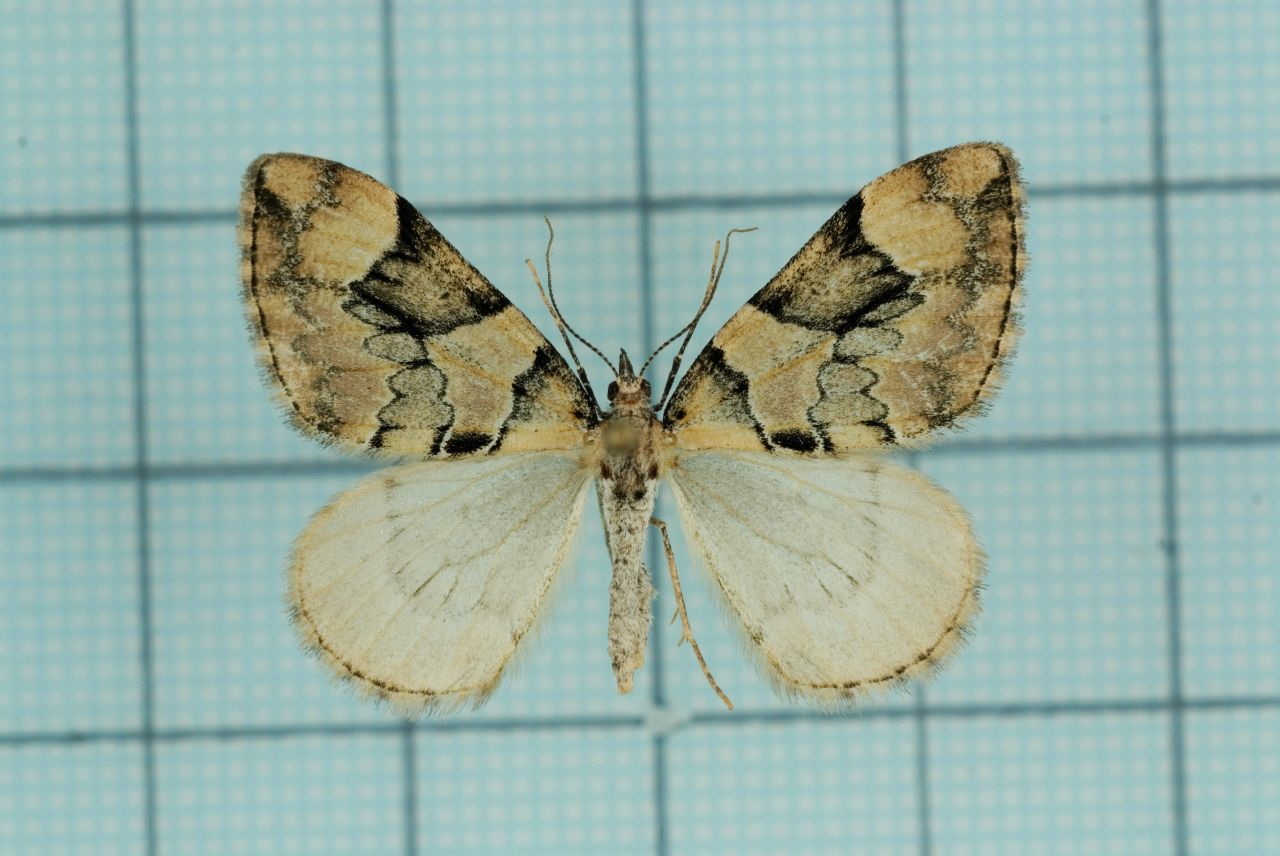
- Pennithera manifesta

Scientific classification
- Domain: Eukaryota
- Kingdom: Animalia
- Phylum: Arthropoda
- Class: Insecta
- Order: Lepidoptera
- Family: Geometridae
- Tribe: Cidariini
- Genus: Pennithera; Viidalepp, 1980

= Pennithera =

Genus of moths

Pennithera is a genus of moths in the family Geometridae.

== Species ==
- Pennithera abolla (Inoue, 1943)
- Pennithera comis (Butler, 1879)
- Pennithera distractata (Sterneck, 1928)
- Pennithera djakonovi (Kurentzov, 1950)
- Pennithera lugubris Inoue, 1986
- Pennithera manifesta Inoue, 1986
- Pennithera subalpina Inoue, 1986
- Pennithera subcomis Inoue, 1978
- Pennithera ulicata (Rambur, 1834)
