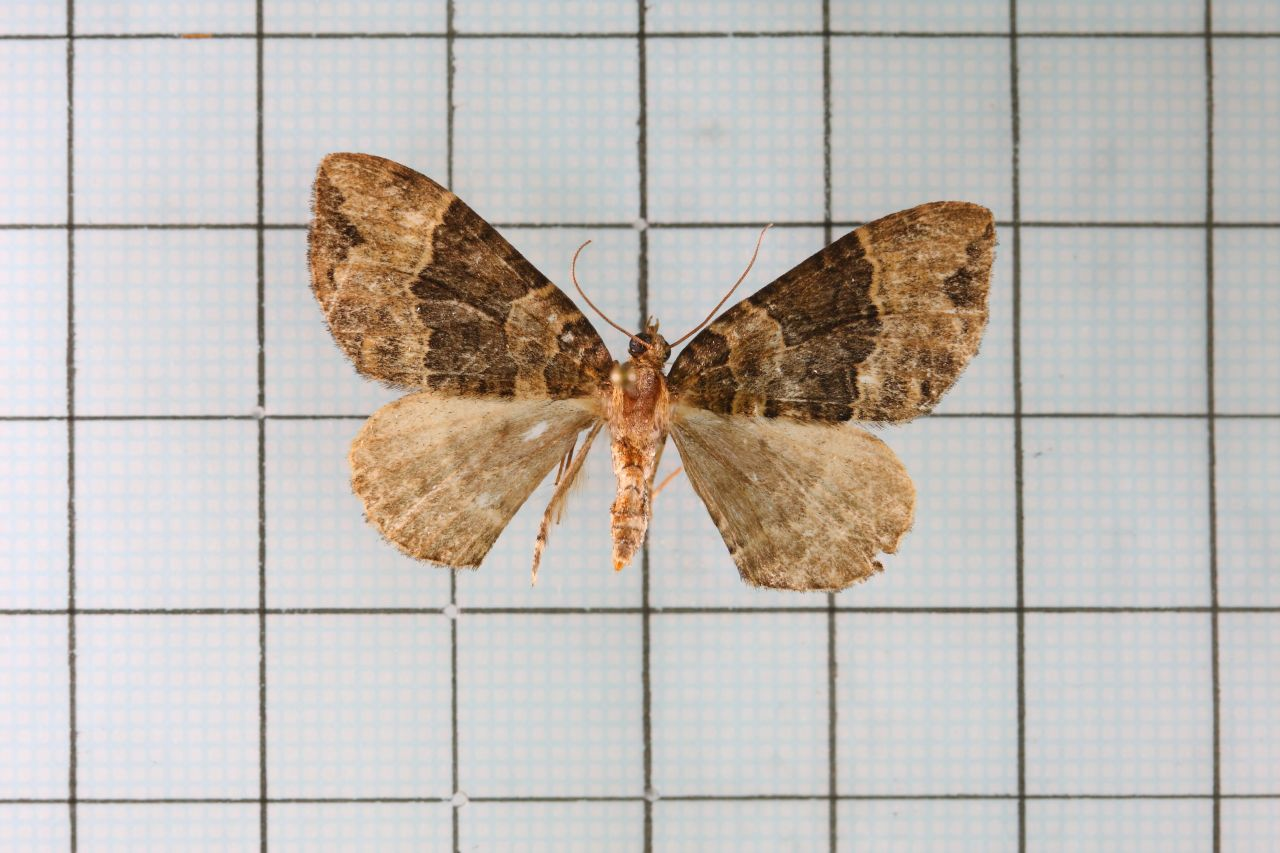

Scientific classification
- Kingdom: Animalia
- Phylum: Arthropoda
- Class: Insecta
- Order: Lepidoptera
- Family: Geometridae
- Genus: Ecliptopera
- Species: E. muscicolor

Binomial name
- Ecliptopera muscicolor (Moore, 1888)

Synonyms
- Eustroma muscicolor Moore, 1888; Cidaria subapicalis Swinhoe, 1894; Ecliptopera allobathra Prout, 1931

= Ecliptopera muscicolor =

Species of moth

Ecliptopera muscicolor is a moth of the family Geometridae. It was described by Frederic Moore in 1888. It is found in India, Sri Lanka and Taiwan.

== Description ==
Wingspan is about 36 millimetres (1.4 in) in male and 42 millimetres (1.7 in) in female. Antennae of male almost simple and somewhat thickened. Male with the inner area of forewings not distorted, nor the costa of hindwings lobed. Male also lack hairy tufts on underside of forewings. It is a typically brown colored moth. Forewings with somewhat produced apex. The basal area darker, with two nearly straight lines on it. The medial area darker, whereas its inner and outer edges defined by waved lines, where the outer slightly dentate on veins 3 and 1. Two irregularly waved dark medial lines, which approach each other at lower angle of cell. A crenulate dark submarginal line present. A black crescent found on margin from apex to middle, and black spot found above outer angle. Hindwings fuscous. Ventral sides with waved postmedial and crenulate submarginal lines.

Females found from Sri Lanka are yellowish brown, with the basal and medial areas of forewings, which are not darker.

== Subspecies ==
- Ecliptopera muscicolor muscicolor (India, Sri Lanka)
- Ecliptopera muscicolor allobathra (Prout, 1931) (Taiwan)
