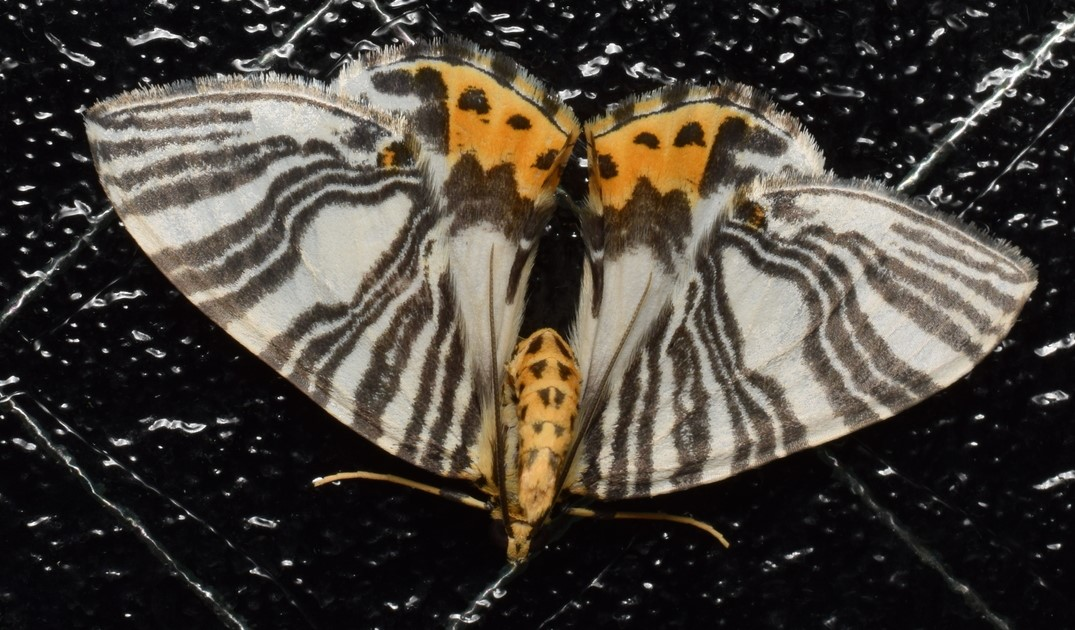
- Callabraxas compositata

Scientific classification
- Kingdom: Animalia
- Phylum: Arthropoda
- Class: Insecta
- Order: Lepidoptera
- Family: Geometridae
- Tribe: Cidariini
- Genus: Callabraxas; Butler, 1880

= Callabraxas =

Genus of moths

Callabraxas is a genus of moths in the family Geometridae.

== Species ==
- Callabraxas amanda Butler, 1880
- Callabraxas compositata (Guenée, 1857)
- Callabraxas convexa (Wileman, 1911)
- Callabraxas fabiolaria (Oberthür, 1884)
- Callabraxas intersectaria (Leech, 1897)
- Callabraxas liva (Xue, 1990)
- Callabraxas ludovicaria (Oberthür, 1880)
- Callabraxas nigritella (Xue, 1992)
- Callabraxas plurilineata (Walker, 1862)
- Callabraxas trigoniplaga (Hampson, 1895)
