= Trichodezia kindermanni =

Scientific classification
- Domain: Eukaryota
- Kingdom: Animalia
- Phylum: Arthropoda
- Class: Insecta
- Order: Lepidoptera
- Family: Geometridae
- Genus: Trichodezia
- Species: T. kindermanni

Binomial name
- Trichodezia kindermanni (Bremer, 1864)

Synonyms
- Odezia kindermanni Bremer, 1864

Species of moth

Trichodezia kindermanni is a moth in the family Geometridae. It is found in the Russian Far East, China and Japan.

== Subspecies ==
- Trichodezia kindermanni kindermanni
- Trichodezia kindermanni latifasciaria Matsumura, 1925 (Japan)
- Trichodezia kindermanni leechi Inoue, 1946 (Russian Far East, Kuriles)
- Trichodezia kindermanni leucocratia Prout, 1937 (China)
- Trichodezia kindermanni mirabilis Bryk, 1942 (Kunashir Island)
