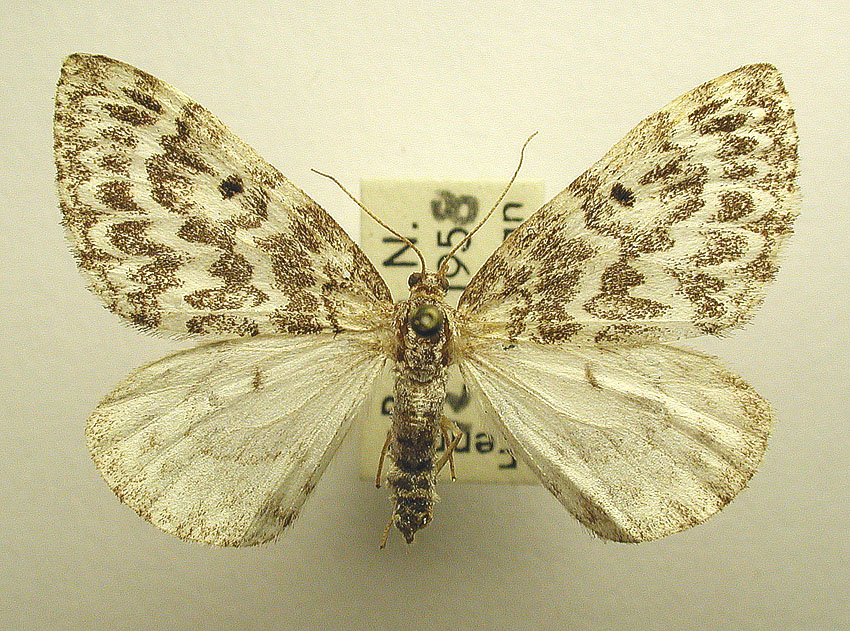

Scientific classification
- Kingdom: Animalia
- Phylum: Arthropoda
- Class: Insecta
- Order: Lepidoptera
- Family: Geometridae
- Genus: Heterothera
- Species: H. serraria

Binomial name
- Heterothera serraria (Lienig, 1846)

Synonyms
- Cidaria serraria Lienig, 1846; Cidaria lienigiaria Lederer, 1853; Melanippe ziczaccata Schöyen, 1875; Larentia serraria ab. continua Strand, 1903; Larentia serraria ab. albida Stichel, 1911; Larentia serraria ab. spania Stichel, 1911; Gnophos serraria; Asaphodes serraria; Viidaleppia serraria; Thera serraria

= Heterothera serraria =

Species of moth

Heterothera serraria is a moth of the family Geometridae. It is found from Fennoscandia, Denmark, Poland and the Baltic states to eastern Siberia.

The wingspan is 25–30 mm.

The larvae feed on Picea species, including Picea abies.
