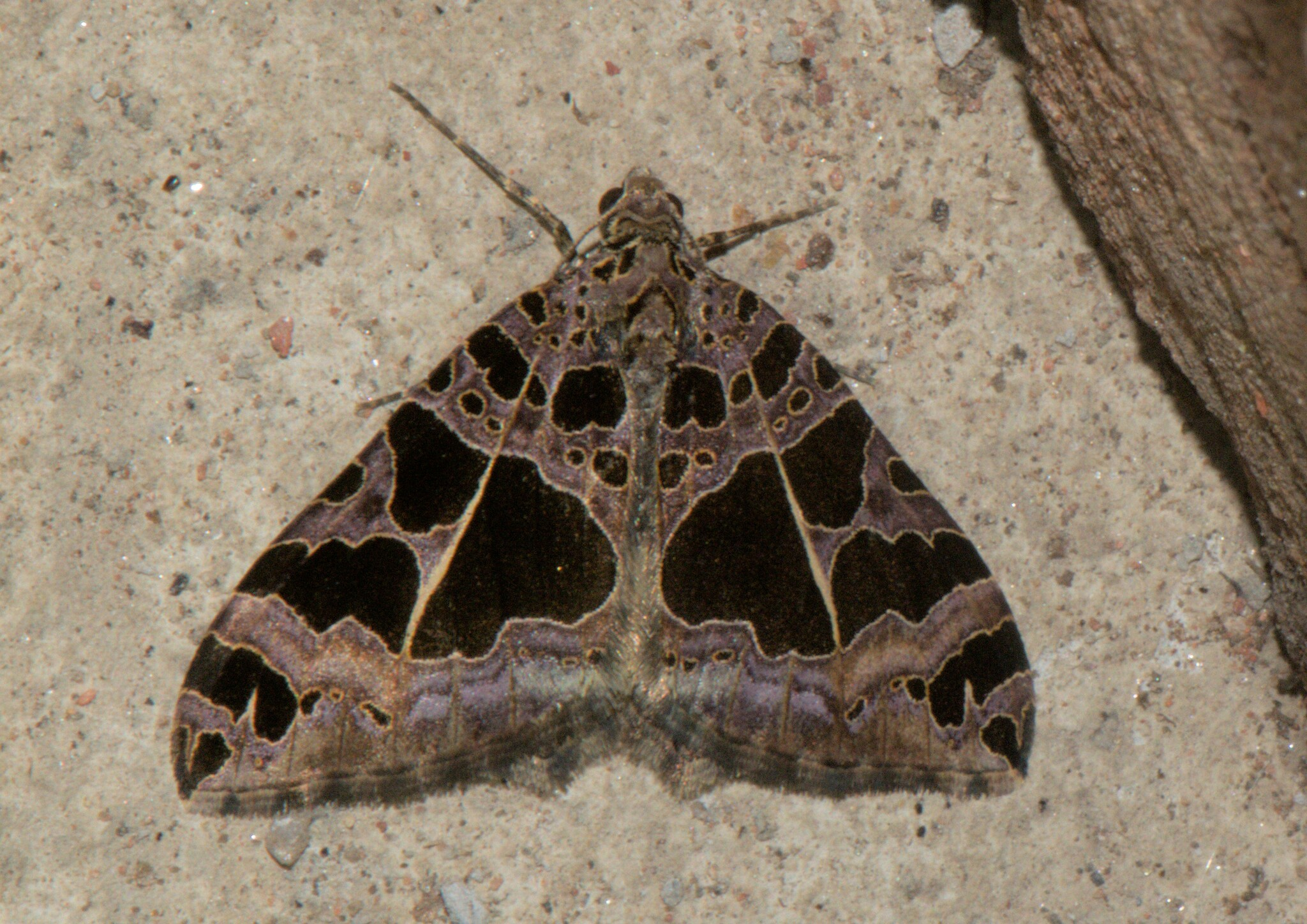
- Hysterura multifaria

Scientific classification
- Kingdom: Animalia
- Phylum: Arthropoda
- Class: Insecta
- Order: Lepidoptera
- Family: Geometridae
- Tribe: Cidariini
- Genus: Hysterura; Warren, 1895

Synonyms
- Eulygris Staudinger, 1897; Lygridopsis Warren, 1895

= Hysterura =

Genus of moths

Hysterura is a genus of moths in the family Geometridae described by Warren in 1895.

== Species ==
- Hysterura cervinaria Moore, 1868
- Hysterura declinans (Staudinger, 1897)
  - Hysterura declinans bergmani Bryk, 1949
- Hysterura hypischyra Prout, 1937
- Hysterura literataria Leech, 1897
- Hysterura multifaria (Swinhoe, 1889)
- Hysterura protagma Prout, 1940
  - Hysterura protagma agaura Prout, 1940
- Hysterura vacillans Prout, 1940
