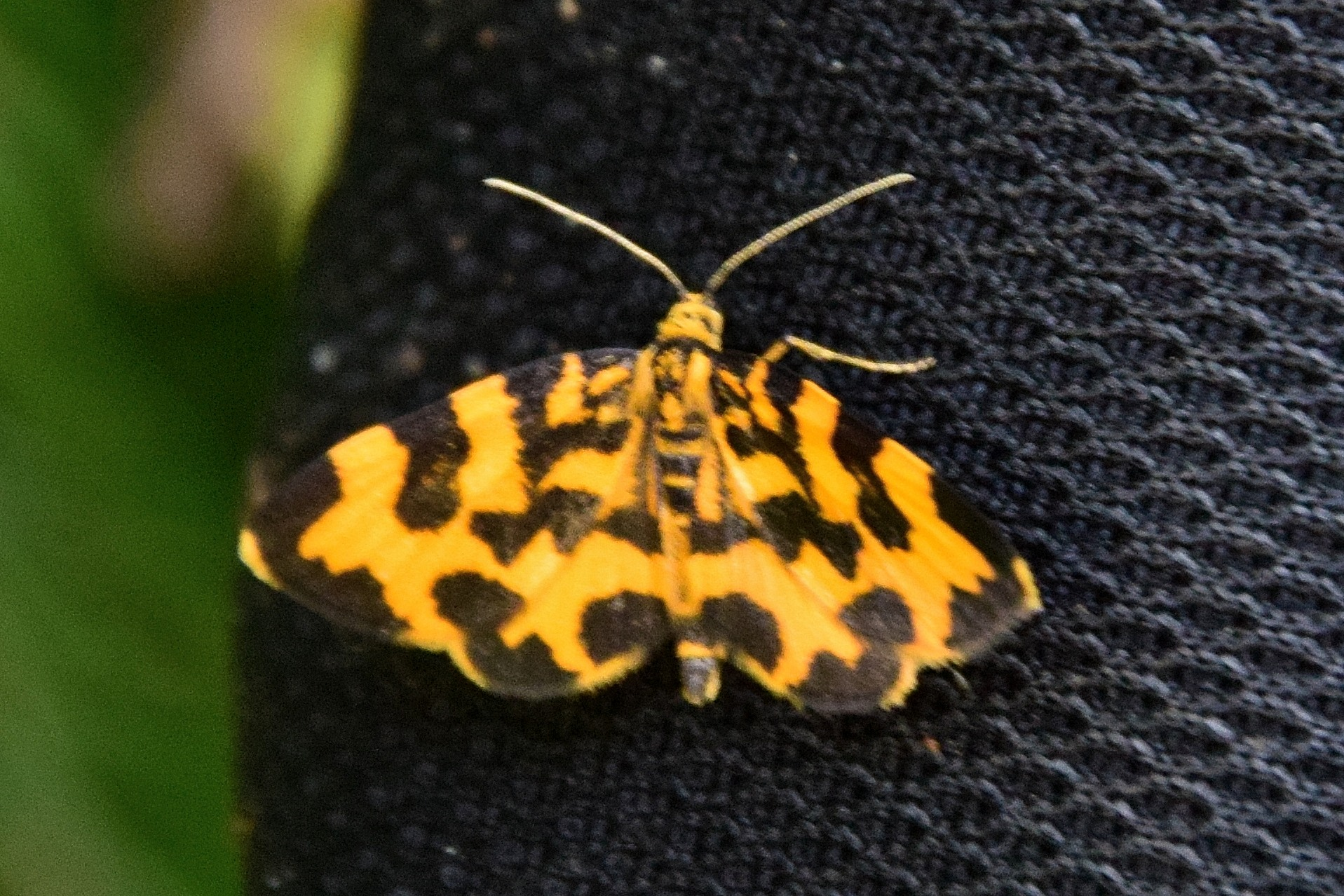
- Polythrena coloraria

Scientific classification
- Domain: Eukaryota
- Kingdom: Animalia
- Phylum: Arthropoda
- Class: Insecta
- Order: Lepidoptera
- Family: Geometridae
- Tribe: Cidariini
- Genus: Polythrena

= Polythrena =

Genus of moths

Polythrena is a genus of moths in the family Geometridae.
