= Ecliptopera subnubila =

Scientific classification
- Kingdom: Animalia
- Phylum: Arthropoda
- Clade: Pancrustacea
- Class: Insecta
- Order: Lepidoptera
- Family: Geometridae
- Genus: Ecliptopera
- Species: E. subnubila

Binomial name
- Ecliptopera subnubila Prout, 1940

Species of moth

Ecliptopera subnubila is a moth of the family Geometridae.
