= Almeria (moth) =

Scientific classification
- Kingdom: Animalia
- Phylum: Arthropoda
- Class: Insecta
- Order: Lepidoptera
- Family: Geometridae
- Tribe: Cidariini
- Genus: Almeria; Agenjo, 1949

Genus of geometer moths

Almeria is a genus of moths in the family Geometridae.

== Species ==
- Almeria dentata
- Almeria kalischata (Staudinger, 1870)
- Almeria rubrotincta
