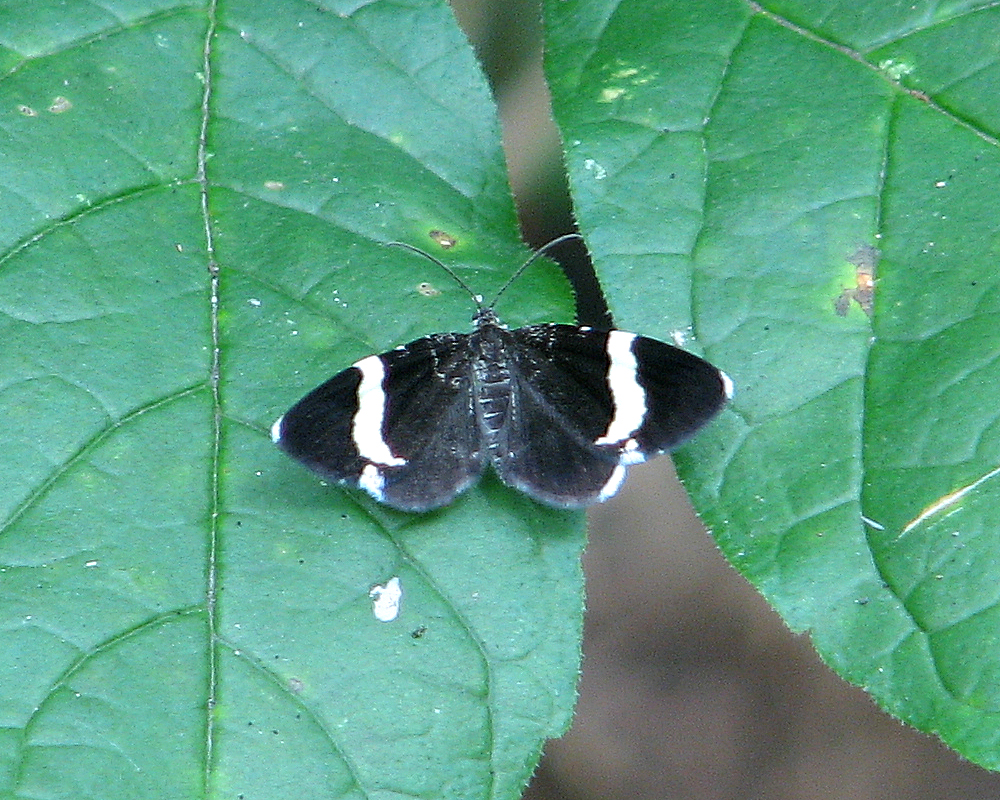
- White-striped black (Trichodezia albovittata)

Scientific classification
- Domain: Eukaryota
- Kingdom: Animalia
- Phylum: Arthropoda
- Class: Insecta
- Order: Lepidoptera
- Family: Geometridae
- Tribe: Cidariini
- Genus: Trichodezia; Warren, 1895

Synonyms
- Neodezia Warren, 1904

= Trichodezia =

Genus of moths

Trichodezia is a genus of moths in the family Geometridae described by Warren in 1895.

== Species ==
Listed alphabetically.

- Trichodezia albofasciata (Grote, 1863)
- Trichodezia albovittata (Guenée, 1857) – white-striped black
- Trichodezia californiata (Packard, 1871)
- Trichodezia haberhaueri (Lederer, 1864)
- Trichodezia kindermanni (Bremer, 1864)
