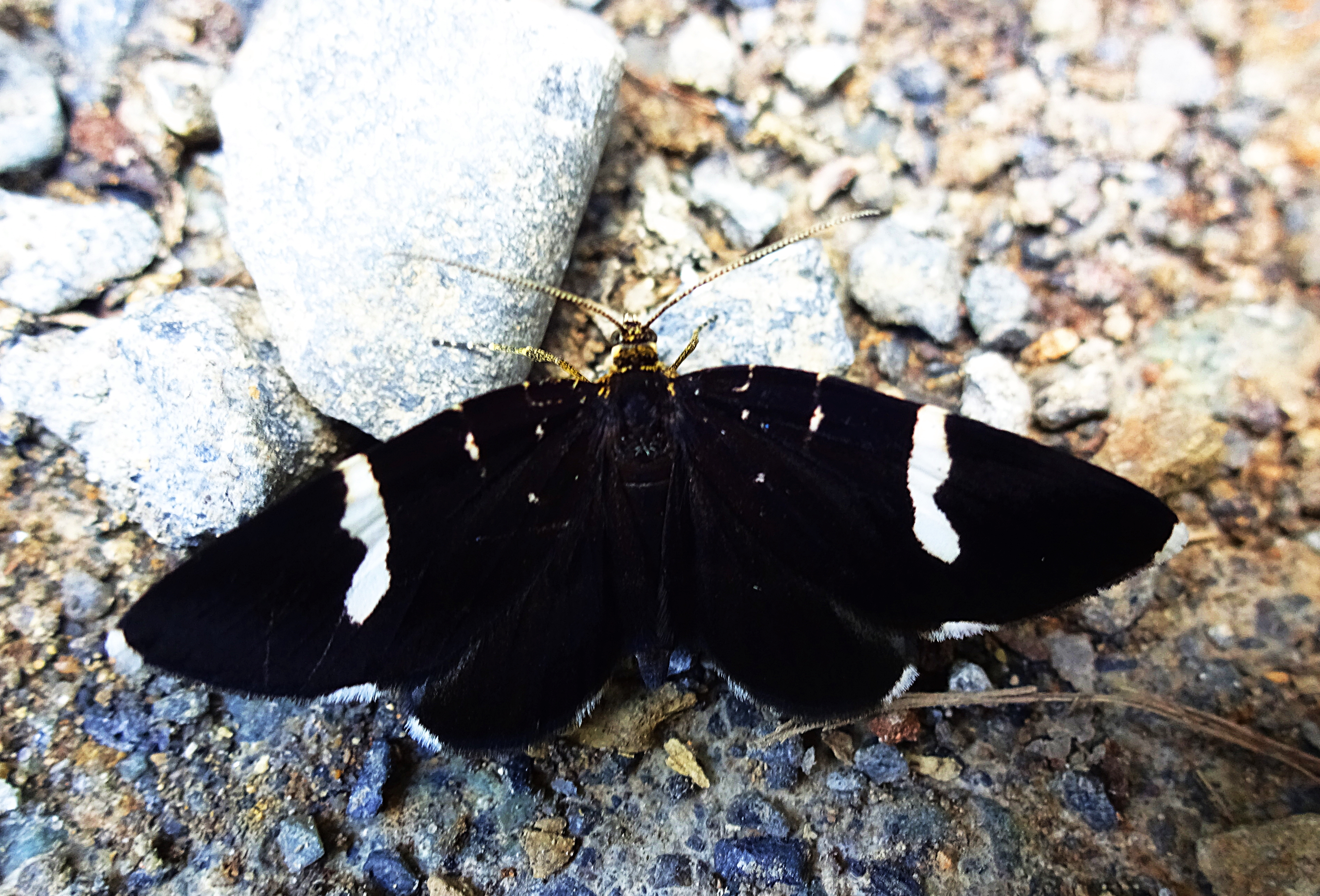
- Trichobaptria exsecuta

Scientific classification
- Kingdom: Animalia
- Phylum: Arthropoda
- Clade: Pancrustacea
- Class: Insecta
- Order: Lepidoptera
- Family: Geometridae
- Tribe: Cidariini
- Genus: Trichobaptria

= Trichobaptria =

Genus of moths

Trichobaptria is a genus of moths in the family Geometridae.
