= Trichodezia albofasciata =

Scientific classification
- Kingdom: Animalia
- Phylum: Arthropoda
- Class: Insecta
- Order: Lepidoptera
- Family: Geometridae
- Genus: Trichodezia
- Species: T. albofasciata

Binomial name
- Trichodezia albofasciata (Grote, 1863)

Synonyms
- Baptria albofasciata Grote, 1863

Species of moth

Trichodezia albofasciata is a moth in the family Geometridae. It is found in the United States.
