= Diathera =

Scientific classification
- Kingdom: Animalia
- Phylum: Arthropoda
- Class: Insecta
- Order: Lepidoptera
- Family: Geometridae
- Tribe: Cidariini
- Genus: Diathera; Choi, 1999

Genus of moths

Diathera is a genus of moths in the family Geometridae.

== Species ==
- Diathera brunneata Choi, 1999
- Diathera fluctuata Choi, 1999
- Diathera metacolorata Choi, 1999
