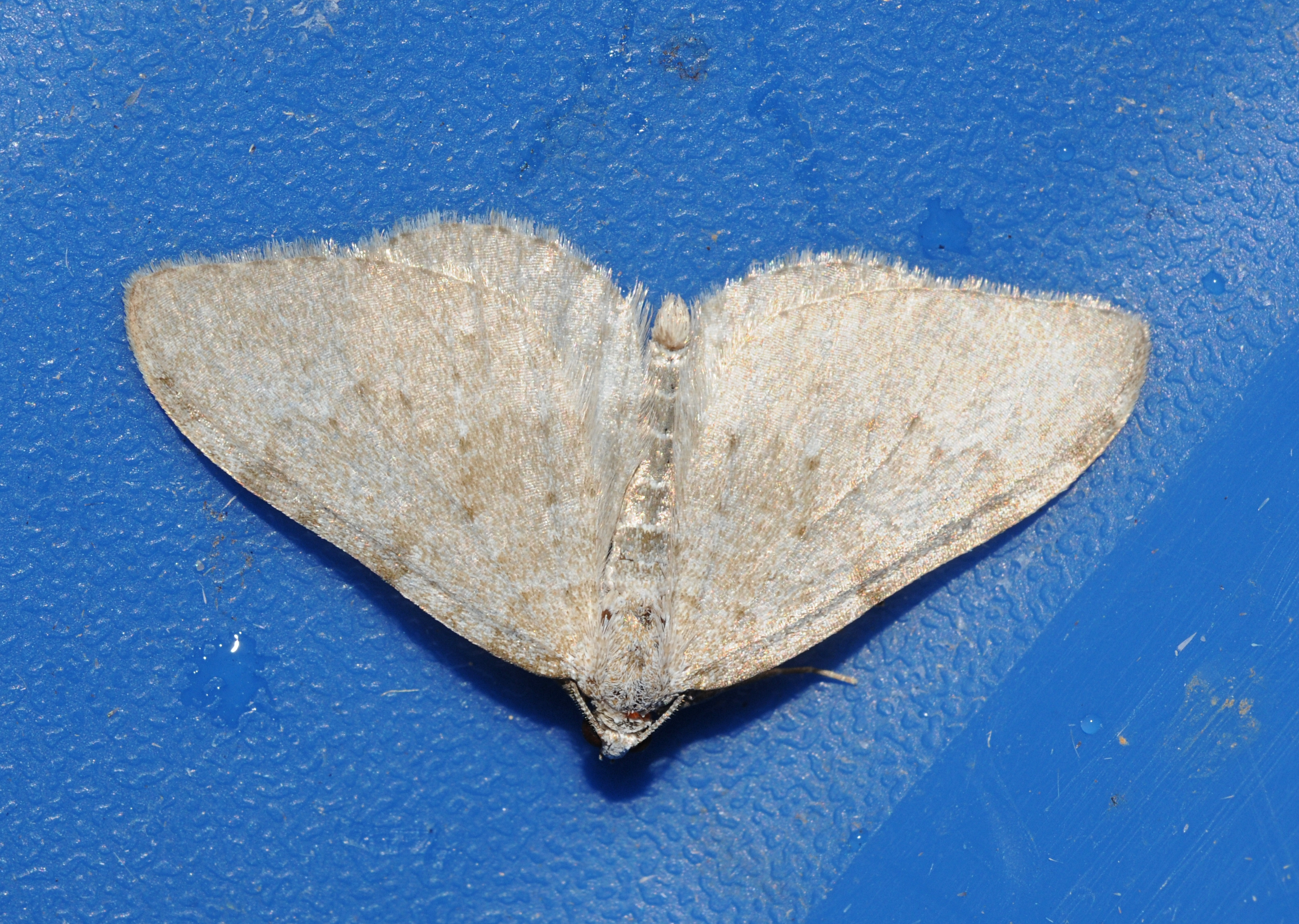
- Nebula achromaria

Scientific classification
- Kingdom: Animalia
- Phylum: Arthropoda
- Class: Insecta
- Order: Lepidoptera
- Family: Geometridae
- Tribe: Cidariini
- Genus: Nebula; Bruand, 1846

= Nebula (moth) =

Genus of moths

Nebula is a genus of moths in the family Geometridae erected by Charles Théophile Bruand d'Uzelle in 1846.

== Species ==
- Nebula achromaria (La Harpe, 1853)
- Nebula adlata (Staudinger, 1895)
- Nebula apiciata (Staudinger, 1892)
- Nebula approximata (Staudinger, 1881)
- Nebula egenata (Prout, 1914)
- Nebula eteocretica (Rebel, 1906)
- Nebula ibericata (Staudinger, 1871)
- Nebula ludificata (Staudinger, 1870)
- Nebula mongoliata (Staudinger, 1892)
- Nebula nebulata (Treitschke, 1828)
- Nebula neogamata (Püngeler, 1908)
- Nebula obvallata (Lederer, 1871)
- Nebula petri (Prout, 1924)
- Nebula propagata (Christoph, 1893)
- Nebula reclamata (Prout, 1914)
- Nebula salicata (Denis & Schiffermüller, 1775)
- Nebula senectaria (Herrich-Schäffer, 1852)
- Nebula tophaceata (Denis & Schiffermüller, 1775)
- Nebula tshatkalensis (Viidalepp, 1988)
- Nebula viduata (Staudinger, 1892)
