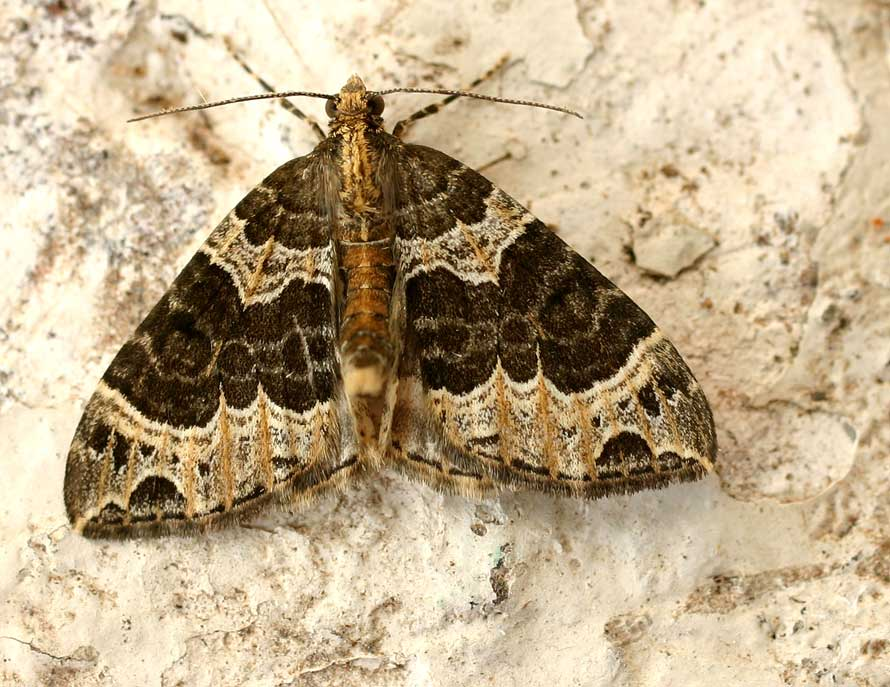

Scientific classification
- Kingdom: Animalia
- Phylum: Arthropoda
- Clade: Pancrustacea
- Class: Insecta
- Order: Lepidoptera
- Family: Geometridae
- Genus: Ecliptopera
- Species: E. capitata

Binomial name
- Ecliptopera capitata (Herrich-Schäffer, 1839)

= Ecliptopera capitata =

Species of moth

Ecliptopera capitata is a moth of the family Geometridae. The species can be found in Europe and east across the Palearctic to Japan.

The length of the forewings is 11–13 mm.

It is a slender, pale brownish-grey moth. It can be recognized by the broad transverse band of the forewing being fairly evenly wide with a shallow, triangular notch on the inner side, and the dark spot at the outer edge of the forewing. Both sexes have filamentous antennae. The forewing is light grey, darker grey at the root. In the middle of the wing there is a broad, grey transverse band. This band is not more than one and a half times as wide at the leading edge as at the hind edge, on the inner side with a shallow, right-sided, triangular notch, on the outside slightly wavy. Outside the transverse band there is a row of dark, arrow-shaped spots, these are largest at the anterior edge and indistinct in the posterior half. At the outer edge of the wing there is an oblong, dark spot. The hindwing is silky greyish-white, darker at the hind corner, with indistinct, grey transverse bands. The larva is long and thin, naked and pale greenish-pink in colour. Warren gives this description in Seitz -Very near Ecliptopera silaceata, on an average somewhat smaller, slightly rounder-winged (intermediate towards decurrens), thorax (except the tegulae) and abdomen pale ochreous dorsally, the dark markings of the forewing on an average darker, median band never white-intersected on the veins, its proximal margin less deeply angulated, posterior half of distal area weakly marked, and with some light ferruginous clouding somewhat recalling that of decurrens. — capitulata Stgr.[now subspecies E. c. capitulata (Staudinger, 1897) is smaller, the distal area of the forewing duller, dirty grey, not brownish; subbasal area and hindwing also somewhat darkened. Amur and Ussuri districts and as an aberration in Japan (Hakodate). Butler’s type of mariesiti [synonym of capitulata Stgr.] is somewhat transitional.

The moths fly in two generations from May to August.

The larvae feed on touch-me-not balsam.

== Notes ==
1. The flight season refers to the Belgium and The Netherlands. This may vary in other parts of the range.
