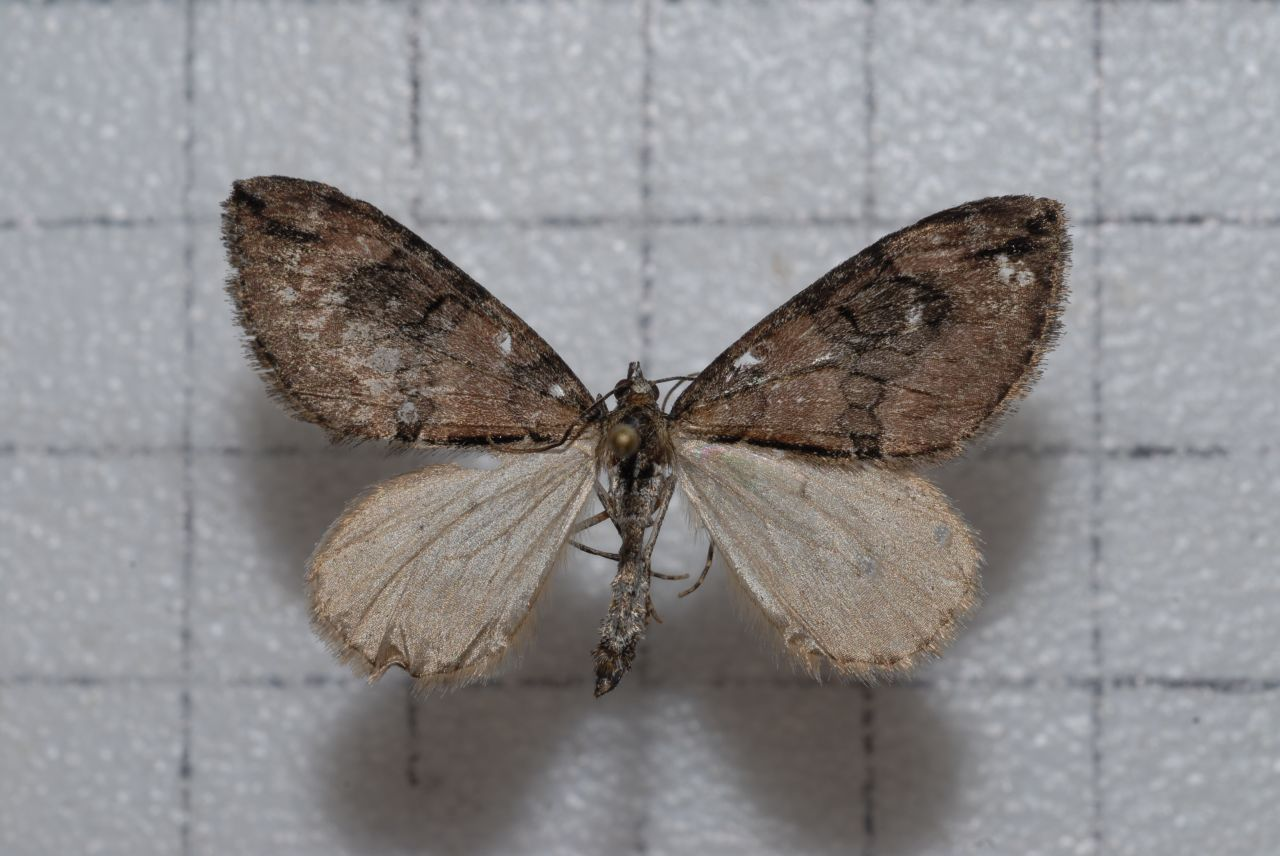
- Heterothera sororcula

Scientific classification
- Kingdom: Animalia
- Phylum: Arthropoda
- Class: Insecta
- Order: Lepidoptera
- Family: Geometridae
- Tribe: Cidariini
- Genus: Heterothera; Inoue, 1943

= Heterothera =

Genus of moths

Heterothera is a genus of moths in the family Geometridae described by Hiroshi Inoue in 1943.

== Species ==
- Heterothera comitabilis (Prout, 1923)
- Heterothera consimilis (Warren, 1888)
- Heterothera dentifasciata (Hampson, 1895)
- Heterothera distinctata Choi, 1998
- Heterothera eclinosis Choi, 1998
- Heterothera etes (Prout, 1926)
- Heterothera hoenei Choi, 1998
- Heterothera incerta (Inoue, 1986)
- Heterothera kurenzovi Choi, Viidalepp & Vasjurin, 1998
- Heterothera mussooriensis Choi, 1998
- Heterothera obscurata Choi, 1998
- Heterothera postalbida (Wileman, 1911)
- Heterothera quadrifulta (Prout, 1938)
- Heterothera serraria (Lienig, 1846)
- Heterothera serrataria (Prout, 1914)
- Heterothera sororcula (Bastelberger, 1909)
- Heterothera stamineata Choi, 1998
- Heterothera taigana (Djakonov, 1926)
- Heterothera tephroptilus (D. S. Fletcher, 1961)
- Heterothera triangulata Choi, 1998
- Heterothera undulata (Warren, 1888)
- Heterothera yunnanensis Choi, 1998
