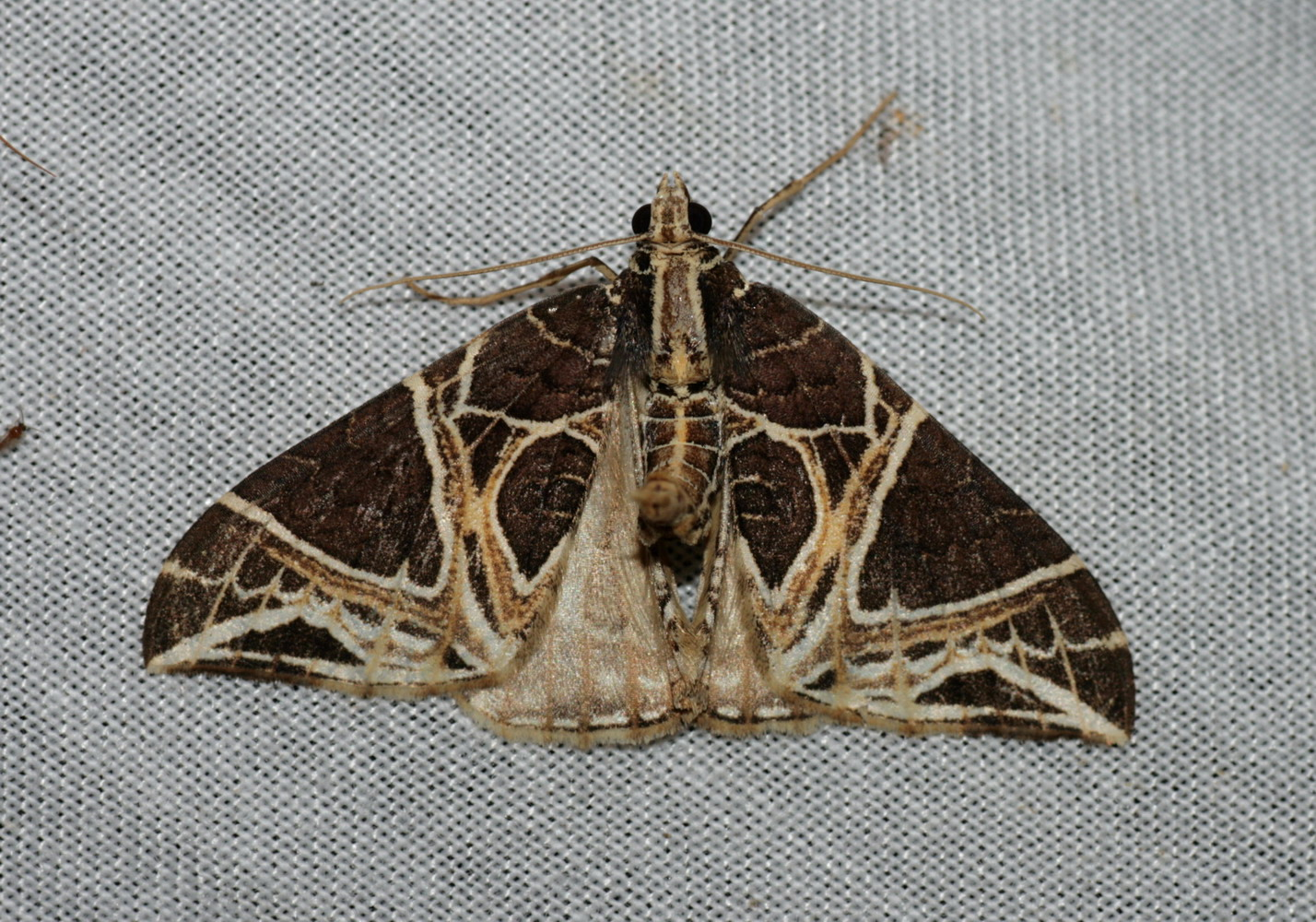
- Ecliptopera rectilinea

Scientific classification
- Kingdom: Animalia
- Phylum: Arthropoda
- Clade: Pancrustacea
- Class: Insecta
- Order: Lepidoptera
- Family: Geometridae
- Tribe: Cidariini
- Genus: Ecliptopera; Warren, 1894

Synonyms
- Diactinia Warren, 1898; Urolophia Swinhoe, 1900; Ecliptoptera

= Ecliptopera =

Genus of moths

Ecliptopera is a genus of moths in the family Geometridae.

== Species ==
- Ecliptopera acalles (Prout, 1938)
- Ecliptopera albogilva Prout, 1931
- Ecliptopera angustaria (Leech, 1897)
- Ecliptopera atricolorata (Grote & Robinson, 1867)
- Ecliptopera benigna (Prout, 1914)
- Ecliptopera capitata (Herrich-Schäffer, 1839)
- Ecliptopera ctenoplia Prout, 1931
- Ecliptopera delecta (Butler, 1880)
- Ecliptopera dentifera (Moore, 1888)
- Ecliptopera dimita (Prout, 1938)
- Ecliptopera dissecta (Moore, 1887)
- Ecliptopera falsiloqua (Prout, 1938)
- Ecliptopera fastigiata (Püngeler, 1908)
- Ecliptopera fervidaria (Leech, 1897)
- Ecliptopera fulvidorsata (Warren, 1894)
- Ecliptopera fulvotincta (Hampson, 1895)
- Ecliptopera furva (Swinhoe, 1891)
- Ecliptopera furvoides (Thierry-Mieg, 1915)
- Ecliptopera haplocrossa (Prout, 1938)
- Ecliptopera leucoglyphica (Warren, 1898)
- Ecliptopera litterata (West, 1929)
- Ecliptopera lucrosa Prout, 1940
- Ecliptopera macarthuri (Prout, 1938)
- Ecliptopera mixtilineata (Hampson, 1895)
- Ecliptopera muscicolor Prout, 1931
- Ecliptopera oblongata (Guenee, 1858)
- Ecliptopera obscurata (Moore, 1868)
- Ecliptopera odontoplia Prout, 1935
- Ecliptopera phaula Prout, 1933
- Ecliptopera postpallida (Prout, 1938)
- Ecliptopera pryeri (Butler, 1878)
- Ecliptopera recordans Prout, 1940
- Ecliptopera rectilinea Warren, 1894
- Ecliptopera relata (Butler, 1880)
- Ecliptopera sagittatoides (Pagenstecher, 1900)
- Ecliptopera silaceata – small phoenix (Denis & Schiffermüller, 1775)
- Ecliptopera subapicalis (Hampson, 1891)
- Ecliptopera subfalcata (Warren, 1893)
- Ecliptopera subnubila Prout, 1940
- Ecliptopera substituta (Walker, 1866)
- Ecliptopera thalycra Prout, 1928
- Ecliptopera triangulifera (Moore, 1888)
- Ecliptopera umbrosaria (Motschulsky, [1861])
- Ecliptopera zaes Prout, 1932
- Ecliptopera zophera Prout, 1931
