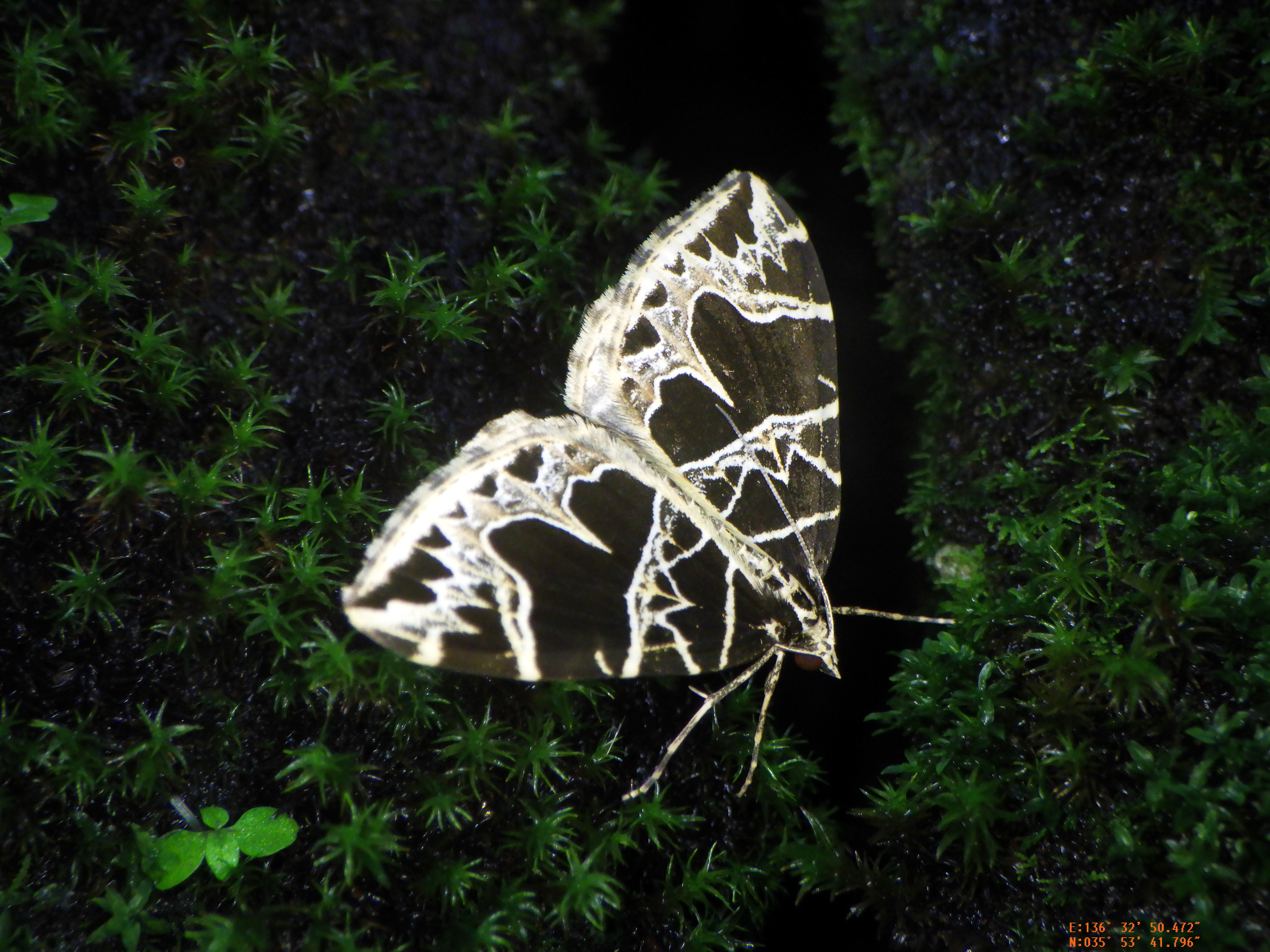
- Sibatania mactata

Scientific classification
- Kingdom: Animalia
- Phylum: Arthropoda
- Class: Insecta
- Order: Lepidoptera
- Family: Geometridae
- Tribe: Cidariini
- Genus: Sibatania

= Sibatania =

Genus of moths

Sibatania is a genus of moths in the family Geometridae.
