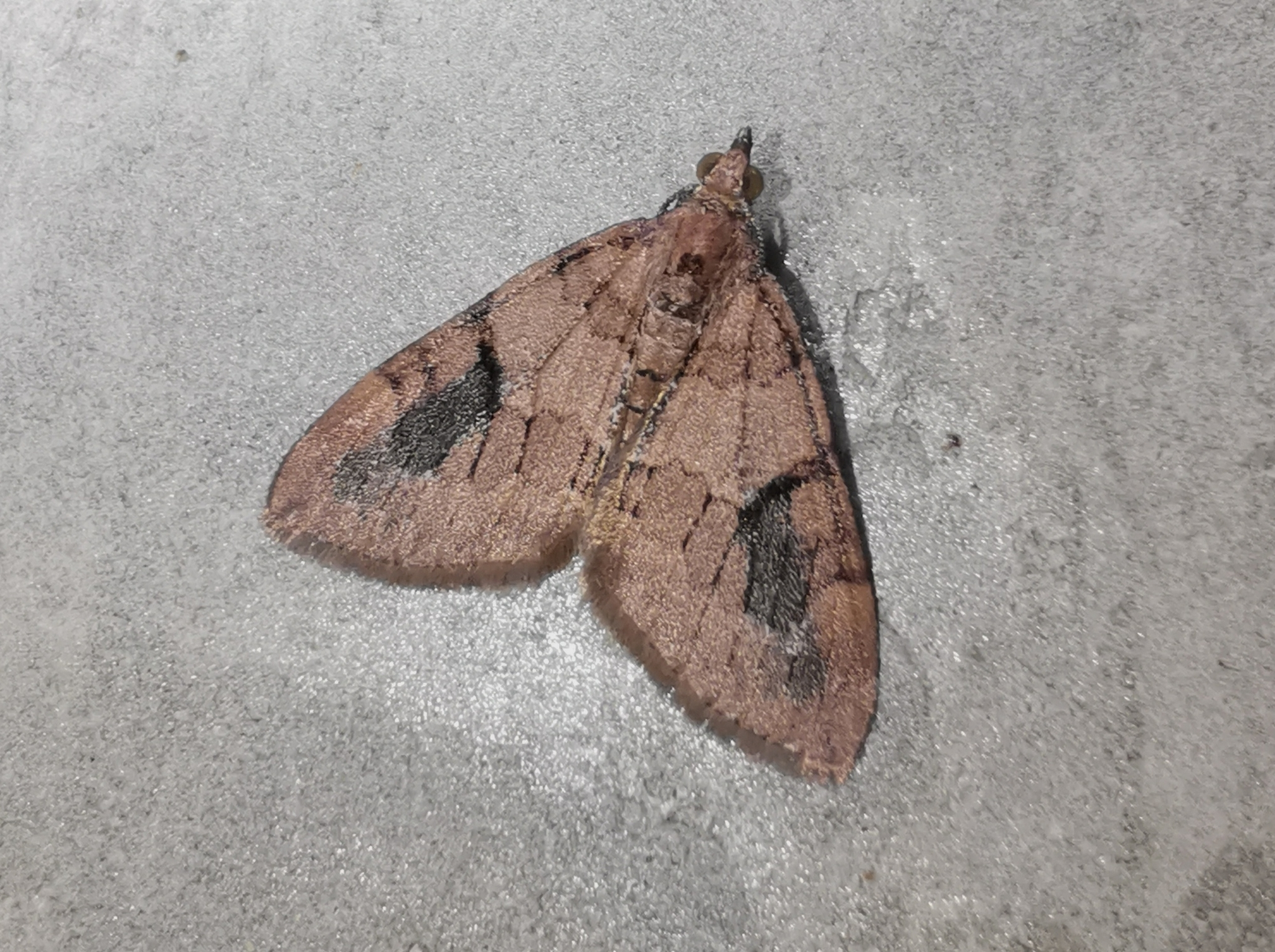

Scientific classification
- Kingdom: Animalia
- Phylum: Arthropoda
- Clade: Pancrustacea
- Class: Insecta
- Order: Lepidoptera
- Family: Geometridae
- Genus: Fascilunaria; Choi, 2000
- Species: F. cyphoschema

Binomial name
- Fascilunaria cyphoschema (Prout, 1926)

Synonyms
- Cidaria (Thera) cyphoschema Prout, 1926; Cidaria atrinotata de Joannis, 1929; Cidaria atrinotata reducta de Joannis, 1929; Thera cyphoschema; Heterothera cyphoschema

= Fascilunaria =

Fascilunaria cyphoschema

Genus of moths

Fascilunaria is a genus of moths in the family Geometridae. It consists of only one species, Fascilunaria cyphoschema, which is found in south-western China, northern Vietnam and Burma.
