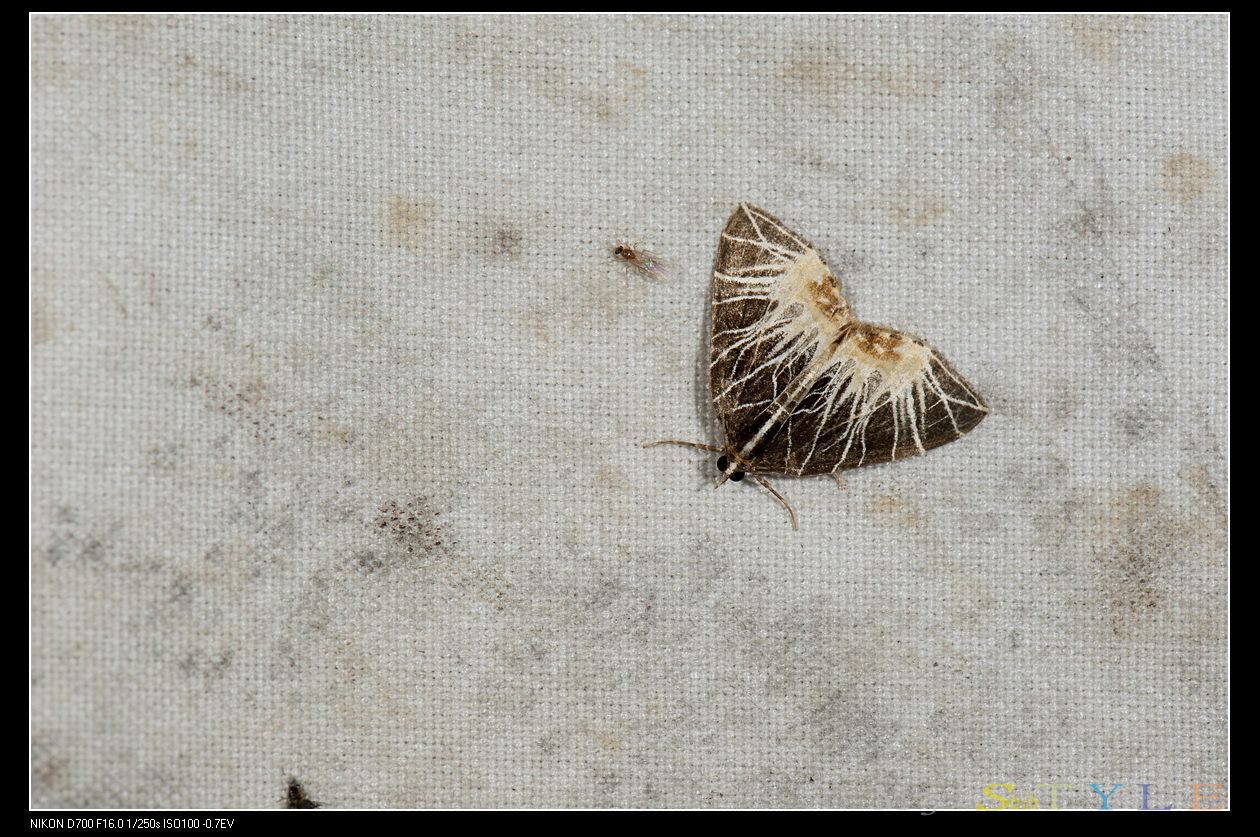

Scientific classification
- Kingdom: Animalia
- Phylum: Arthropoda
- Clade: Pancrustacea
- Class: Insecta
- Order: Lepidoptera
- Family: Geometridae
- Tribe: Cidariini
- Genus: Evecliptopera; Inoue, 1982
- Species: E. decurrens

Binomial name
- Evecliptopera decurrens (Moore, 1888)

Synonyms
- Cidaria decurrens Moore, 1888; Cidaria oblongata Walker, 1862; Ecliptopera acreta Prout, 1940; Ecliptopera excurrens Prout, 1930; Cidaria illitata Wileman, 1911; Ecliptopera insurgens Prout, 1930

= Evecliptopera =

Genus of moths

Evecliptopera is a monotypic genus of moths in the family Geometridae described by Inoue in 1982. Its only species, Evecliptopera decurrens, first described by Frederic Moore in 1888, is found in northern India, Nepal, south-western China, Japan, the Russian Far East and Taiwan.

The larvae feed on Akebia species.

== Subspecies ==
- Evecliptopera decurrens decurrens (India, Nepal, China)
- Evecliptopera decurrens acreta (Prout, 1940) (Taiwan)
- Evecliptopera decurrens excurrens (Prout, 1930)
- Evecliptopera decurrens illitata (Wileman, 1911) (Japan)
- Evecliptopera decurrens insurgens (Prout, 1930)
