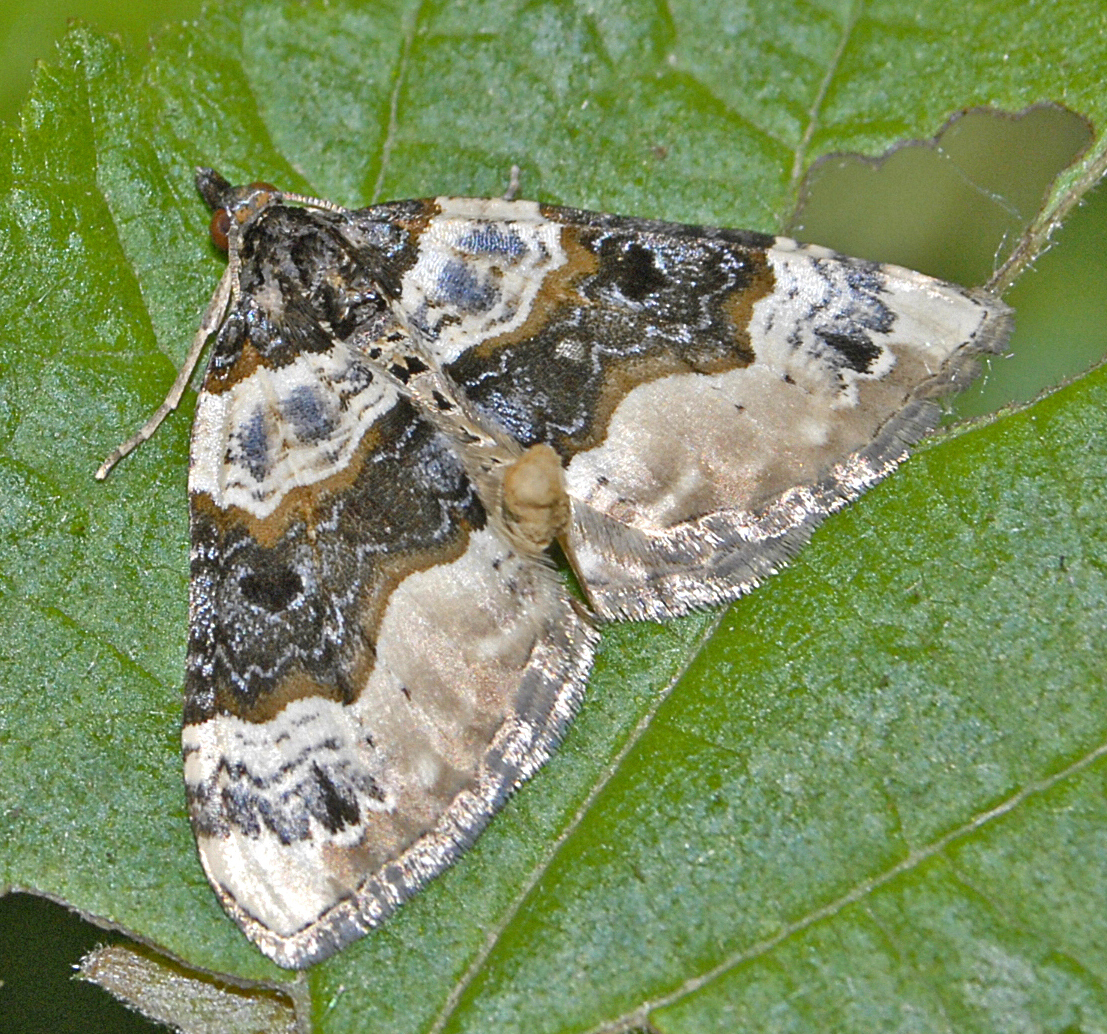

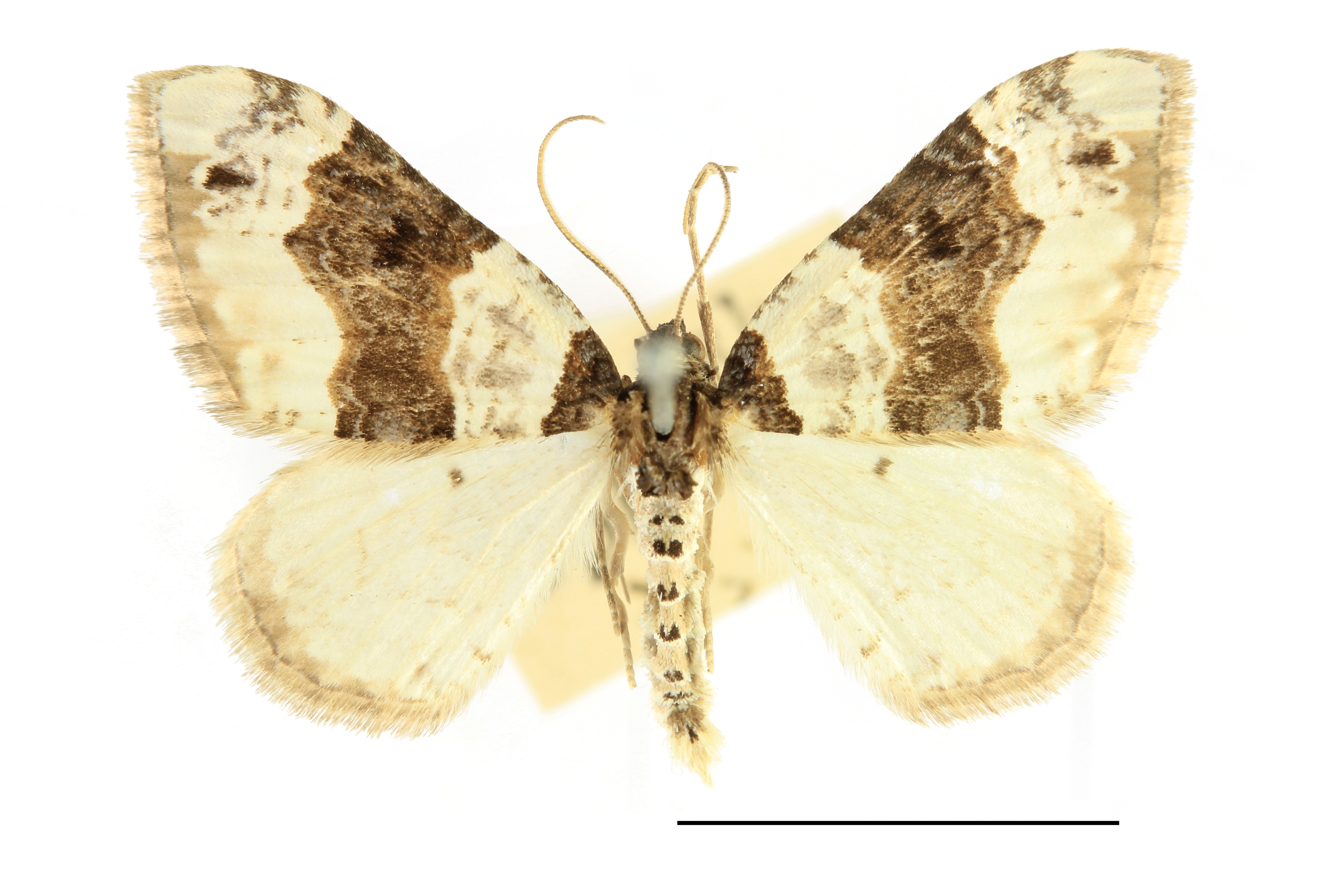
- Cosmorhoe ocellata

Conservation status
- Least Concern (IUCN 3.1)

Scientific classification
- Kingdom: Animalia
- Phylum: Arthropoda
- Clade: Pancrustacea
- Class: Insecta
- Order: Lepidoptera
- Family: Geometridae
- Tribe: Lampropterygini
- Genus: Cosmorhoe; Hübner, 1825
- Species: C. ocellata

Binomial name
- Cosmorhoe ocellata (Linnaeus, 1758)

Synonyms
- Generic: Lyncometra Prout, 1914; Specific: Phalaena ocellata Linnaeus, 1758

= Cosmorhoe =

Purple bar

Genus of moths

Cosmorhoe is a monotypic genus of moth in the family Geometridae erected by Jacob Hübner in 1825. Its only species, Cosmorhoe ocellata, the purple bar, was described by Carl Linnaeus in his 1758 10th edition of Systema Naturae.

== Distribution ==
The species can be found in the Palearctic realm, which includes western Europe and the British Isles, Central Europe, Central Asia, Asia Minor, and Kyrgyzstan.

== Habitat ==
In the Alps, it can be found at elevations up to 1500 meters. The species is found in many habitats, including heathland, deciduous and mixed forests, forest clearings, bushy places, grasslands, fens, scrub, gardens and park-like landscapes.

== Description ==
Their wingspan is between 20 and 29 mm and the length of their forewings is between 13 and 15 mm. The ground colour of the forewings is creamy white to bright white. The base and midfield are coloured black to blue black. The latter is crossed by two bright lines. In the midfield band is a deep, jagged spot. In the bright areas between the basal area and the midfield as well as in the marginal field are grey or black spots of varying degrees. The hindwings are whitish and show a small black middle spot.

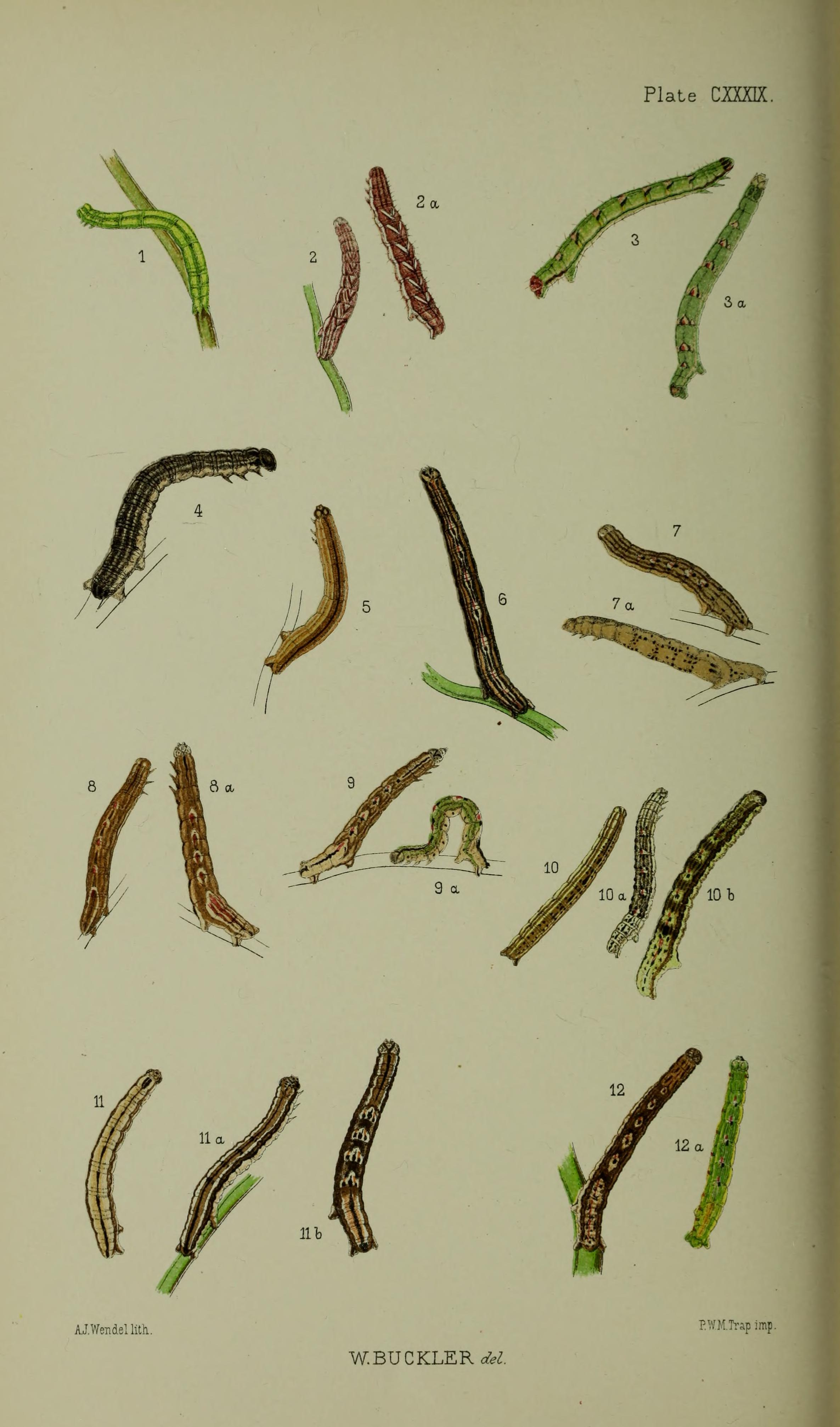
Figs 2, 2a larvae in various stages of growth

Caterpillars are brownish, with bright angled markings on their backs and bright stripes on the sides. The pupa is usually shiny red brown.

== Biology ==
This species shows two generations in the southern United Kingdom (from May to early July and from August to mid-October), but a single brood further north. The moths fly from May to August in the British Isles, and from mid-April till October in other parts of the range. They are active from dusk onwards. The larvae feed from June to September on various species of bedstraw (mainly Galium mollugo and Galium verum). The larvae hibernates as a full-grown larva. They pupate in a cocoon.
