= Jacques Aubert (entomologist) =

Swiss entomologist

- Born: Jacques Aubert; 17 August 1916; Lausanne, Switzerland
- Died: 4 August 1995 (aged 78); Lutry, Switzerland
- Scientific career
- Fields: Entomology

Jacques Aubert (1916, Lausanne – 1995, Lutry) was a Swiss entomologist.

== Career ==
He was a specialist of Plecoptera.

He died in Lutry, Switzerland on 4 August 1995.
