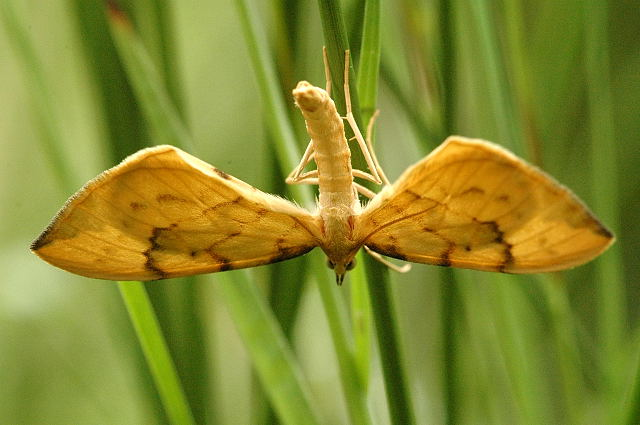

Scientific classification
- Domain: Eukaryota
- Kingdom: Animalia
- Phylum: Arthropoda
- Class: Insecta
- Order: Lepidoptera
- Family: Geometridae
- Genus: Eulithis
- Species: E. pyraliata

Binomial name
- Eulithis pyraliata (Denis & Schiffermüller, 1775)

= Barred straw =

Species of moth

The barred straw (Eulithis pyraliata) is a moth of the family Geometridae. The species was first described by Michael Denis and Ignaz Schiffermüller in 1775. It is sometimes placed in the genus Gandaritis. It is found throughout the Palearctic region, including Britain and Ireland, and also the Near East.

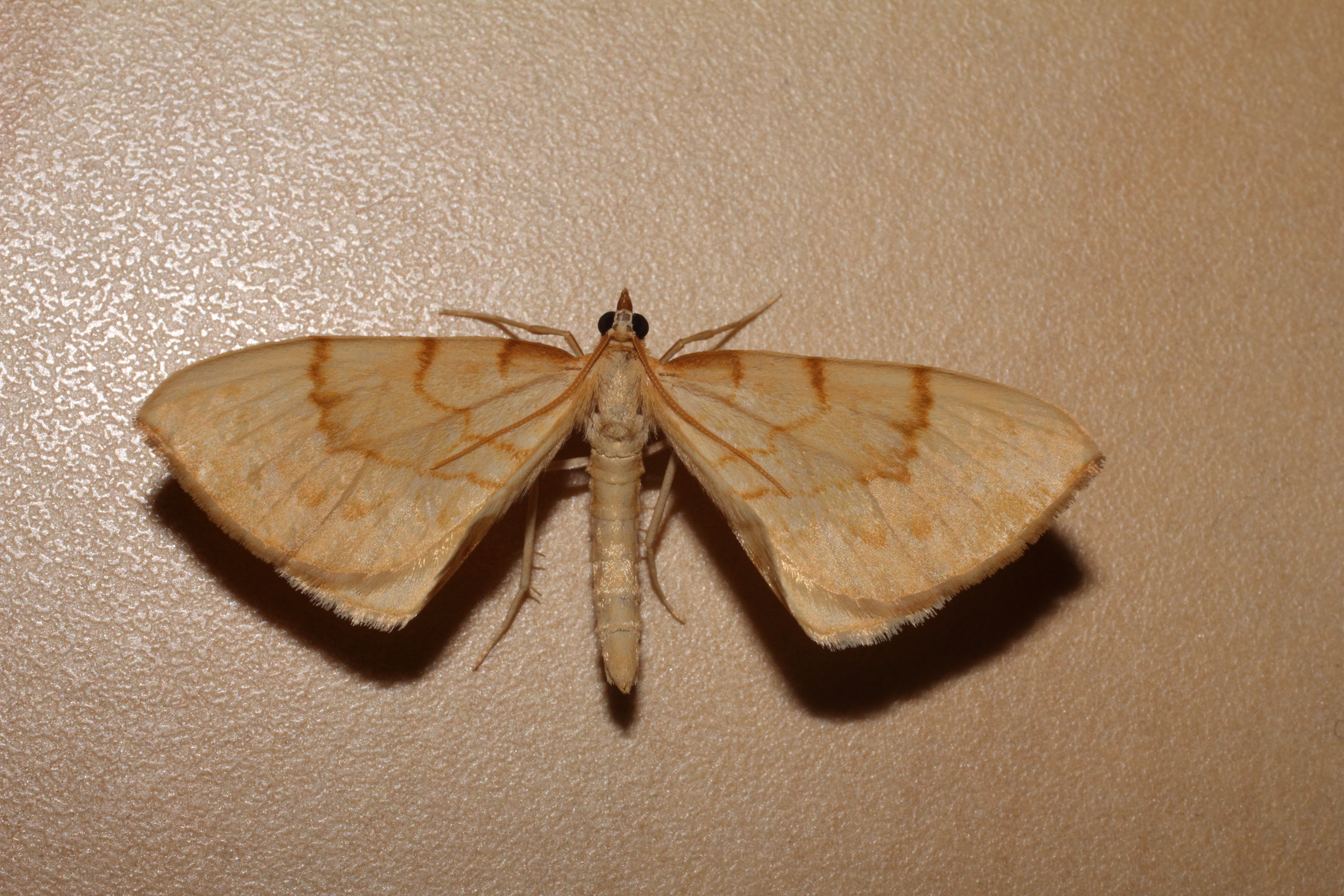

The wingspan is 33–38 mm. The forewings are bright yellow with two narrow brown fascia. The hindwings are cream coloured but are rarely seen due to the characteristic resting position (see spinach moth).The larva is naked, green with two narrow white dorsal stripes.

The species flies at night from June to August and is attracted to light.

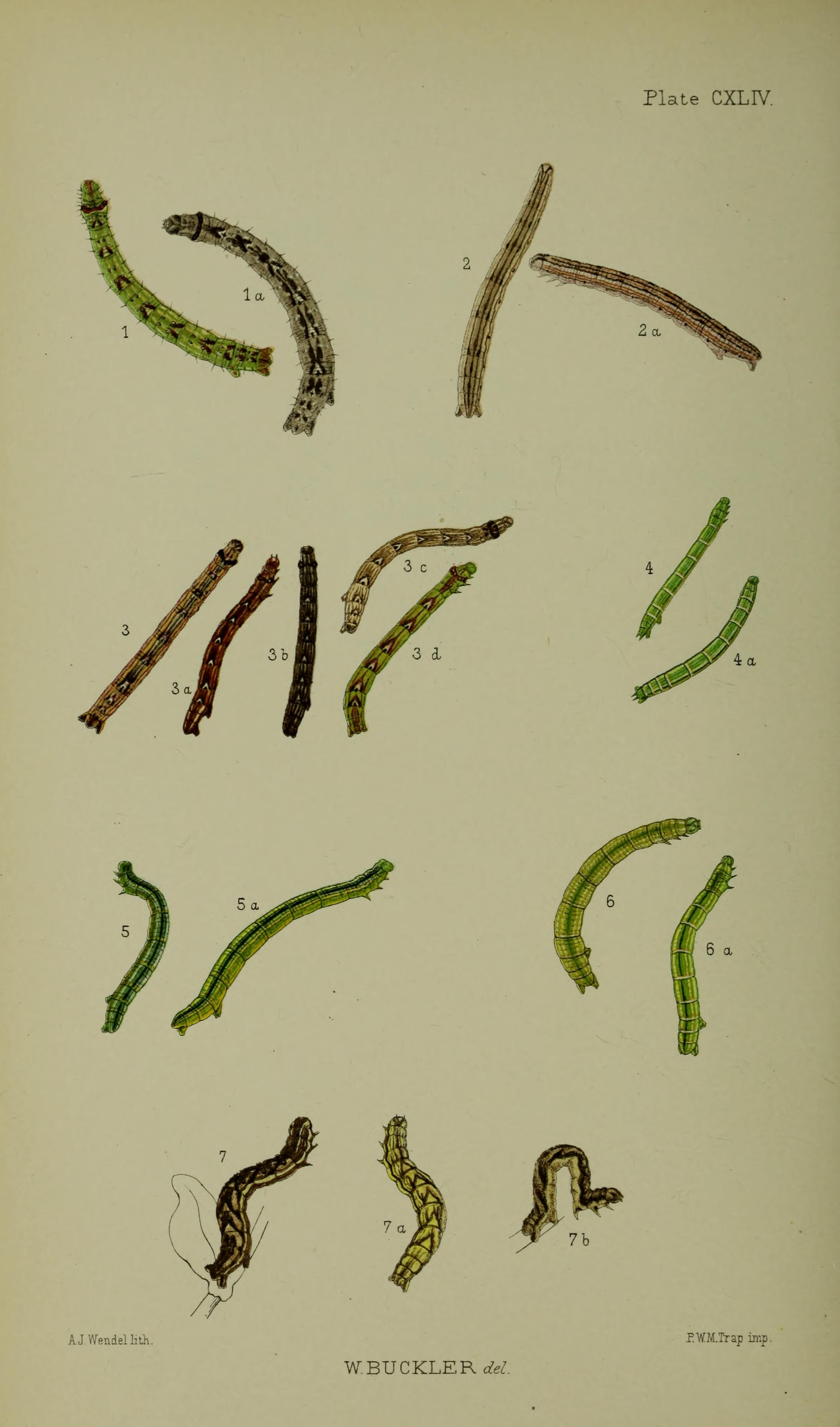
Figs. 5,5a larvae after final moult

The larva feeds on bedstraw. The species overwinters as an egg.

1. The flight season refers to the British Isles. This may vary in other parts of the range.
