= Paradysstroma =

Scientific classification
- Kingdom: Animalia
- Phylum: Arthropoda
- Class: Insecta
- Order: Lepidoptera
- Family: Geometridae
- Tribe: Chesiadini
- Genus: Paradysstroma

Genus of moths

Paradysstroma is a genus of moths in the family Geometridae.
