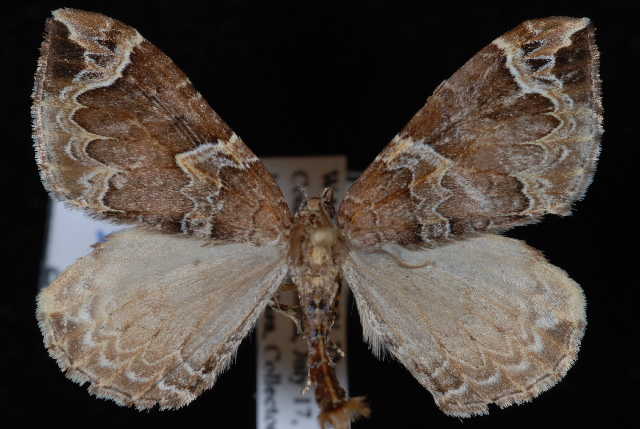

Scientific classification
- Kingdom: Animalia
- Phylum: Arthropoda
- Clade: Pancrustacea
- Class: Insecta
- Order: Lepidoptera
- Family: Geometridae
- Genus: Eulithis
- Species: E. xylina

Binomial name
- Eulithis xylina (Hulst, 1896)

= Eulithis xylina =

Species of moth

Eulithis xylina, the Northwestern Phoenix moth, is a species of Geometrid moth in the family Geometridae. It is a common nocturnal moth with reddish-brown marbled scales intersected with lacy white bands. The larva feeds on a wide range of broad plants. It is found in western North America.

The species was first described by George D. Hulst in “A classification of the Geometrina of North America…” in 1896, under the name Neolexia xylina. The name was moved to the genus Eulithis by Douglas C. Ferguson in 1983. The original description of the species holotype by George Hulst from 1896 can be read in “Classification of the geometrina of North America”.

== Subspecies ==
- Eulithis xylina speciosa
- Eulithis xylina xylina

== Range and habitat ==
Western North America, from Alaska to California and east as far as Colorado and in the boreal forests of Alberta and into Saskatchewan. The majority of sightings are west of the Cascade mountains in British Columbia, Washington and Oregon. It inhabits mesic deciduous, mixedwood forests and riparian habitats.

== Description ==
There is substantial morphological variability within the genus. Wingspan is approx. 29-32mm. Forewing length 15-18 mm. Females have slender filiform antennae, while males have narrow bipectinate (two-combed) antennae adapted to detect microscopic amounts of female pheromones. When at rest, E. xylina characteristically poses with wings spread flat and the end of its abdomen raised.

The forewing has a wide medial band, reddish-brown to greyish brown, across the middle of the wing, broader on costa than on the inner margin. Two narrower light colored bands (postmedial and antemedial areas), of white, tan or pale yellow, on either side of the medial band. There is often a white and/or black outline between bands. The lower edge (outer margin) of the median band has rounded, uneven scallops.

The limbal area of the wing has several unique features. The tip of the forewing (apical region) has a diagonal, white apical stripe, evenly dividing a light top half (costal side) and a dark lower half (outer margin side). Just below this in the costal sub-apical region there are 2-4 distinct black triangular spots.

The submarginal region between the apical area and tornus is variable. There may be no markings, lunate (crescent-shaped) markings, highlighted venation, or additional “triangles”. It is unclear if specimens with a full row of triangular markings are a variation of E. xylina or a related species, such as Eulithis destinata or Eulithis prunata.

The hindwings are a lighter shade of tan or pale yellow with scalloped white lines towards the outer margin. There may be a broken black line along the terminal margin of both fore and hind wings. The legs have alternating dark and light coloration.The post dorsal tuft is yellowish-orange.

== Life cycle ==
The larva is a twig-mimic, with a long, slender body typical of ‘inchworms’. Its body is a golden amber color, with a distinct black-and-white collar between the first and second thoracic segments (T2), with faint intersegmental rings of a pale grey-brown. When disturbed, it stands erect and motionless on its prolegs to appear more like a twig.(5) The caterpillars are generalist feeders eating leaves of flowering leaf trees and shrubs in June and July.

The pupa is a reddish-brown, cylindrical cocoon with one tapered end and a dark brown line running the length of the cocoon found in soil or leaf litter. Adults emerge in mid-summer and are flying from June to September, peaking in late July. This species overwinters as an egg.

== Host plants ==
The larva feeds on a wide range of broad leaf trees and shrubs including: Alder, Azalea, Cinquefoil, Cottonwood, Crab Apple, Current, Huckleberry, Ninebark, Ocean Spray, Red Osier Dogwood, Rose, Serviceberry, Snowberry, and Willow.

== Similar species ==
Many Eulithis moths, and other ‘carpet’ moths are visually similar, with brown bands and complex wing patterns. Distinguishing between them requires close observation and sometimes DNA analysis or dissection.

- Antepirrhoe semiatrata (Black-banded Carpet)
- Ecliptopera silaceata (Small Phoenix)
- Eulithis destinata (Variable Eulithis)
- Eulithis explanata (White Eulithis)
- Eulithis serrataria (Serrated Eulithis)
- Eulithis prunata (The Phoenix)

== Gallery ==
Pinned specimen: E. xylina

Pinned specimen: E. xylina

E. xylina in British Columbia

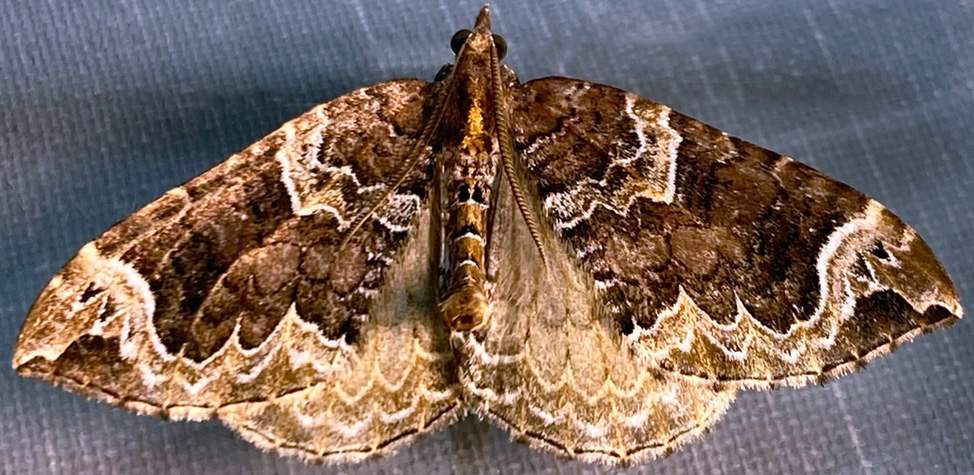
E. xylina in Oregon

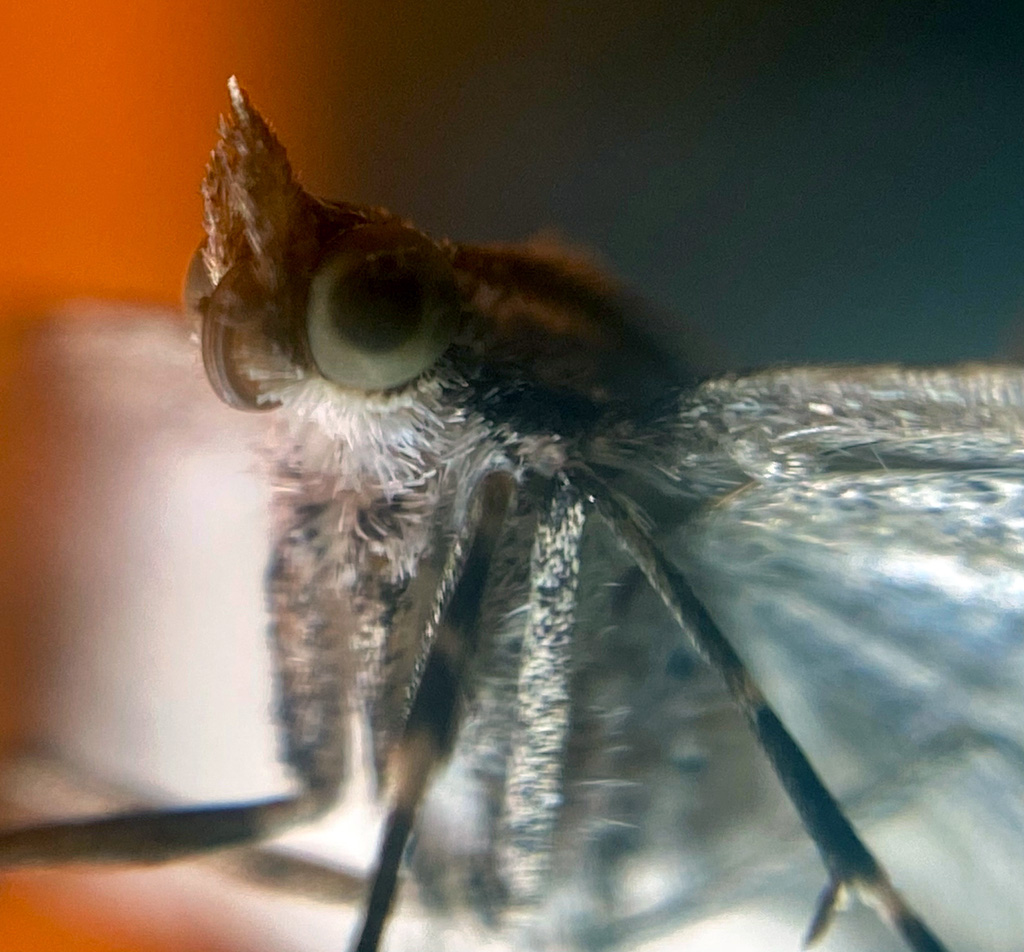
E. xylina, close up of moth's face

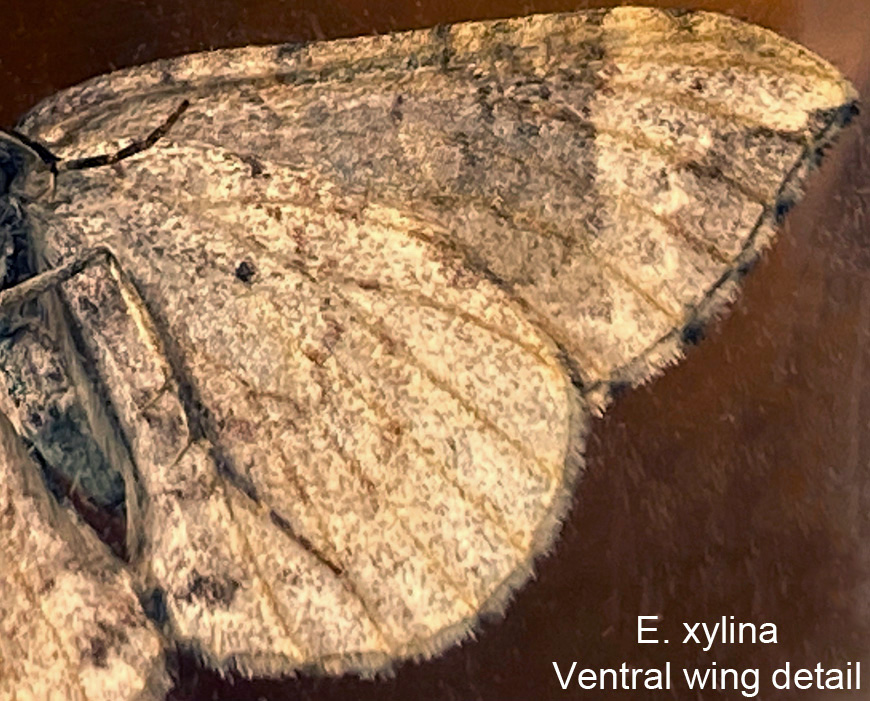
E. xylina, underside of wing

== External links with photos ==
- Media related to Eulithis xylina at Wikimedia Commons
- Bug Guide
- iNaturalist
- Moth Photographers Group
