= Barred yellow =

Barred yellow is used as a common name for:

- Cidaria fulvata, a moth in the family Geometridae found in Europe and Central Asia
- Eulithis propulsata, a moth in the family Geometridae found in North America
- Eurema daira, a butterfly in the family Pieridae found in Argentina north to the southern United States and occasionally other U.S. states
