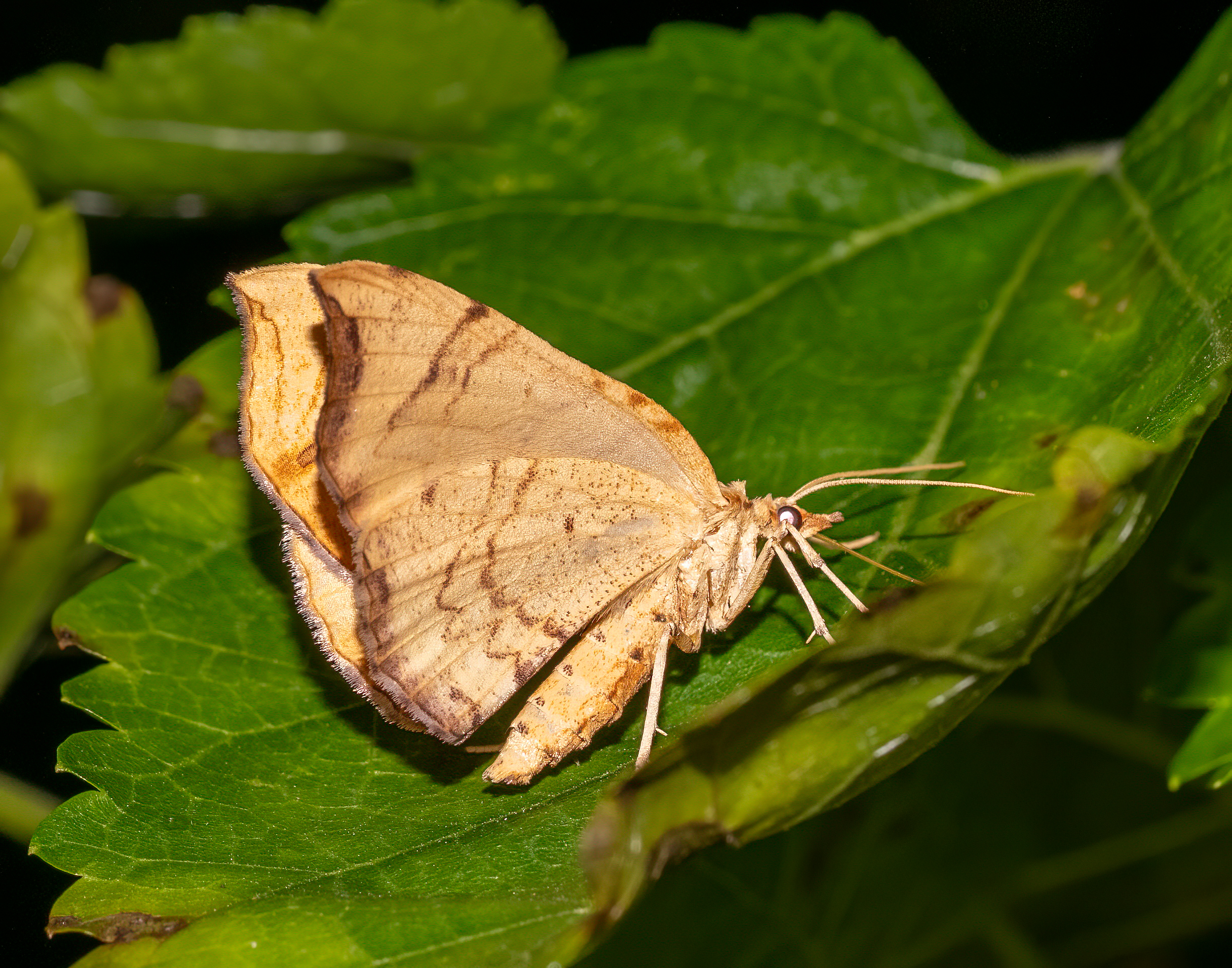

Scientific classification
- Kingdom: Animalia
- Phylum: Arthropoda
- Clade: Pancrustacea
- Class: Insecta
- Order: Lepidoptera
- Family: Geometridae
- Genus: Eulithis
- Species: E. diversilineata

Binomial name
- Eulithis diversilineata (Hübner, [1813])

= Eulithis diversilineata =

Lesser grapevine looper

Species of moth

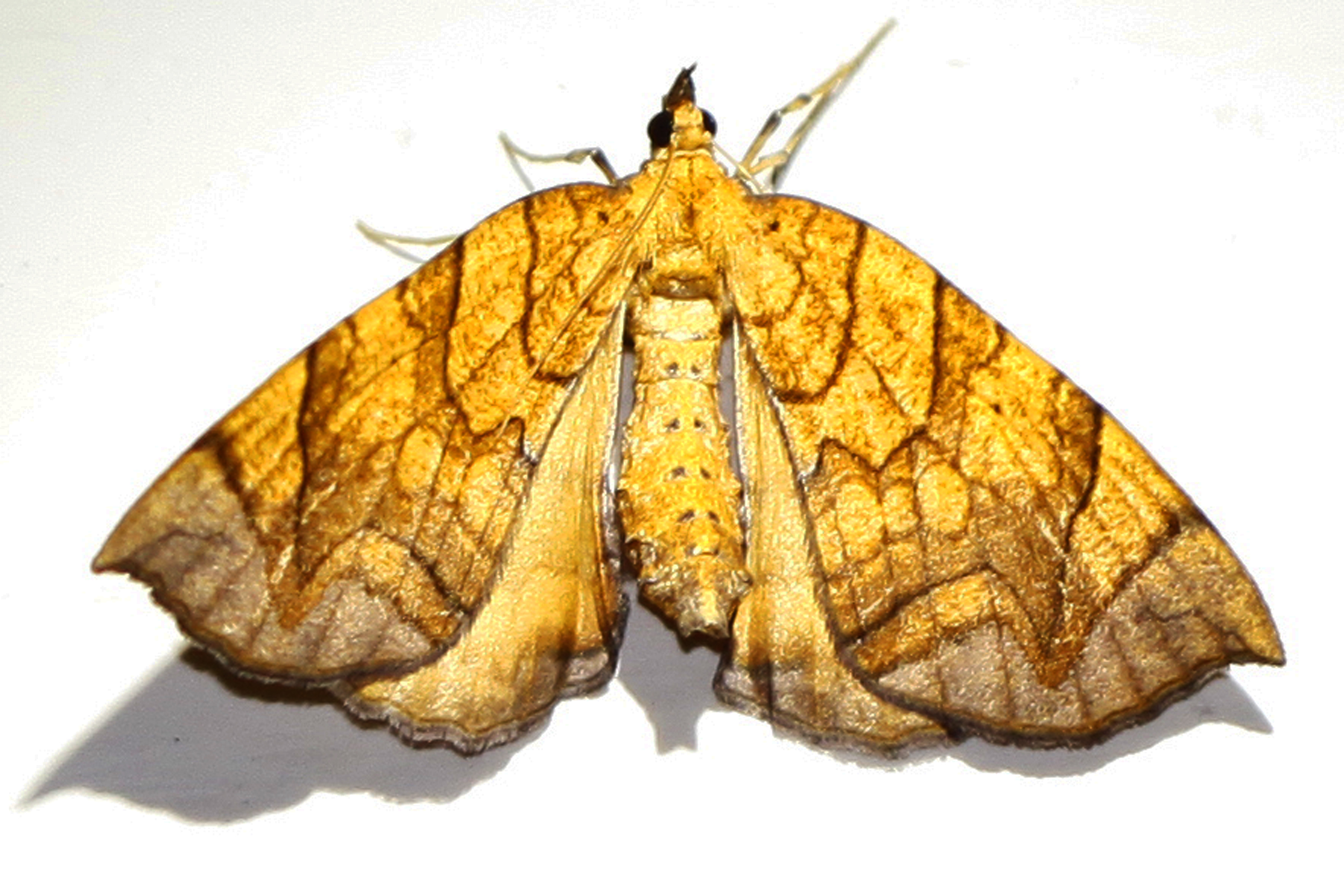
E. diversilineate in Virginia

Eulithis diversilineata, the lesser grapevine looper, is a moth in the family Geometridae. It is found in North America.

== Larvae ==
The caterpillars are known to feed on Grape and Virginia creeper. This moth spends the winter as an egg. There are two generations of mature caterpillars, first June and July, then again from August into October.

The US Forest service booklet, "Geometroid caterpillars of northeastern and Appalachian forests" describes the caterpillat as "A very elongate, yellow-green to red, petiole mimic, this looper has a cleft head and conspicuous paraprocts. [The second thoracic segment] T2 bears a subtle, often pigmented, swelling. The sides of the head, legs, anterior prolegs, and paraprocts may be flushed with russet, red, or violet. Additionally, there may be a reddish middorsal stripe or spots over the anterior and posterior abdominal segments. The body setae are short and whitish. Mature larva to 4 cm."

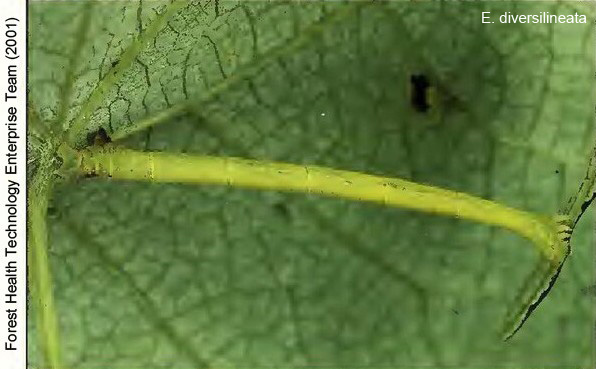
Eulithis diversilineata caterpillar

== Distribution ==
This species is found in forests and along roadsides. Its range includes Montana, southern Ontario, Massachusetts, Florida, Texas, Connecticut and Maryland.

== Similar species ==
- Greater Grapevine Looper (Eulithis gracilineata)
- Chevron Moth (Eulithis testata)
