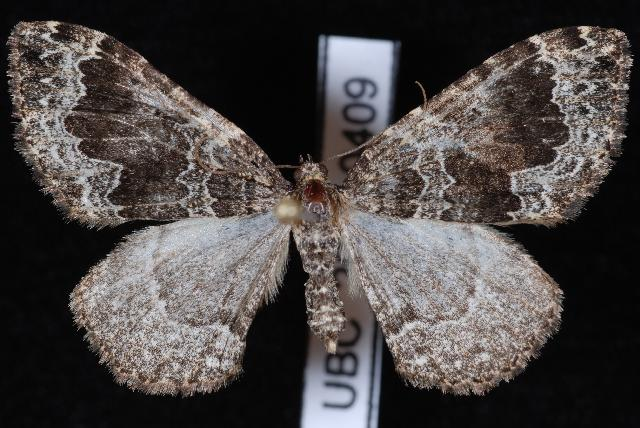

Scientific classification
- Kingdom: Animalia
- Phylum: Arthropoda
- Class: Insecta
- Order: Lepidoptera
- Family: Geometridae
- Tribe: Hydriomenini
- Genus: Antepirrhoe; Warren, 1905

= Antepirrhoe =

Genus of geometer moths

Antepirrhoe is a genus of moths in the family Geometridae described by Warren in 1905.

== Species ==
- Antepirrhoe atrifasciata (Hulst, 1888)
- Antepirrhoe fasciata (Barnes & McDunnough, 1918)
- Antepirrhoe semiatrata (Hulst, 1881)
