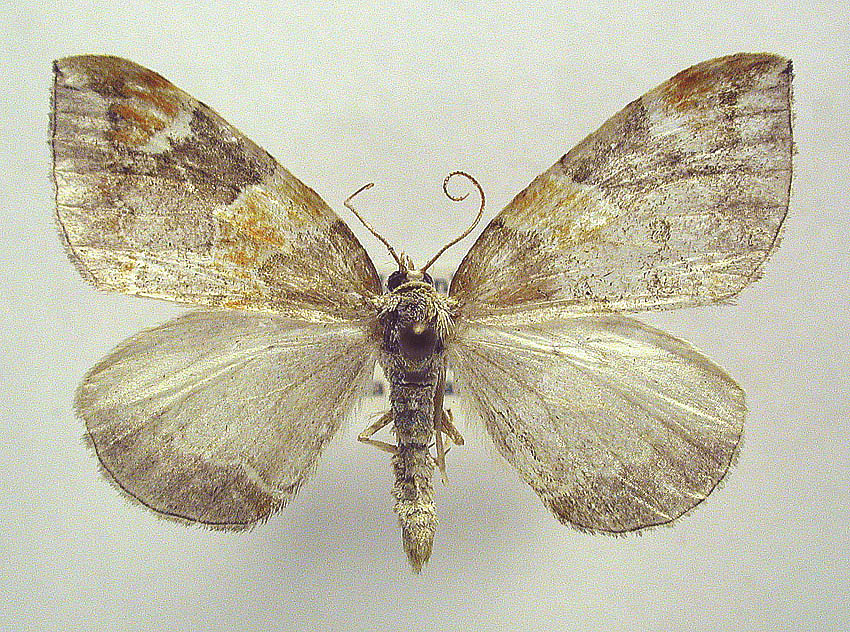

Scientific classification
- Domain: Eukaryota
- Kingdom: Animalia
- Phylum: Arthropoda
- Class: Insecta
- Order: Lepidoptera
- Family: Geometridae
- Genus: Eulithis
- Species: E. pyropata

Binomial name
- Eulithis pyropata (Hübner, 1809)

Synonyms
- Geometra pyropata Hübner, 1809

= Eulithis pyropata =

Species of moth

Eulithis pyropata is a moth of the family Geometridae. It is found from extreme north-eastern Europe (including Sweden and eastern Germany) to Japan and the area surrounding the Ussuri River.

The wingspan is 30–34 mm. Adults are on wing in July and August.

The larvae feed on Ribes nigrum. Larvae can be found from June to July. The species overwinters as an egg.

== Subspecies ==
- Eulithis pyropata pyropata
- Eulithis pyropata elegans (Inoue, 1955)
