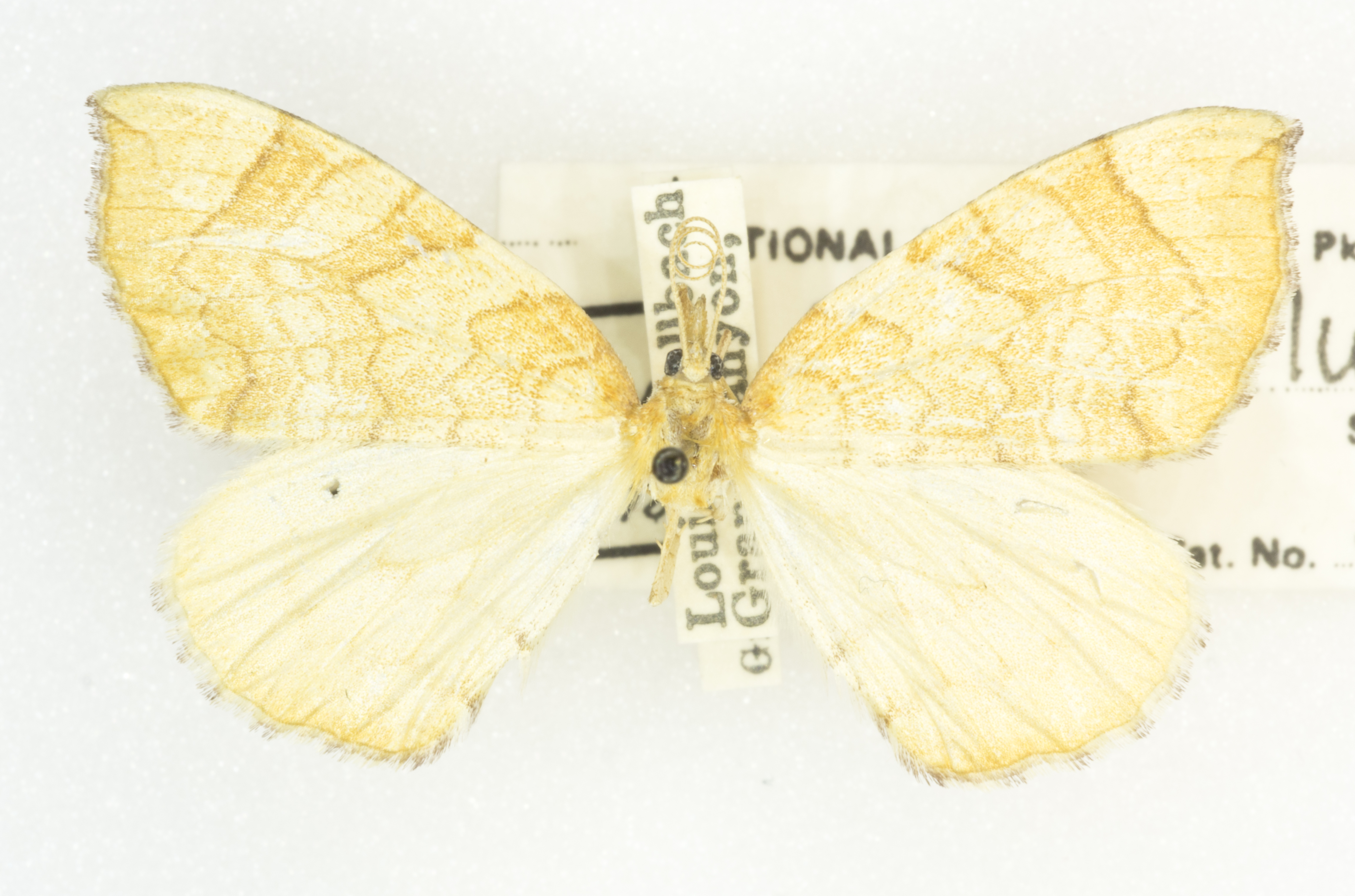

Scientific classification
- Kingdom: Animalia
- Phylum: Arthropoda
- Class: Insecta
- Order: Lepidoptera
- Family: Geometridae
- Genus: Eulithis
- Species: E. luteolata

Binomial name
- Eulithis luteolata (Hulst, 1896)

= Eulithis luteolata =

Species of moth

Eulithis luteolata is a species of geometrid moth in the family Geometridae. It is found in North America.

The MONA or Hodges number for Eulithis luteolata is 7198.
