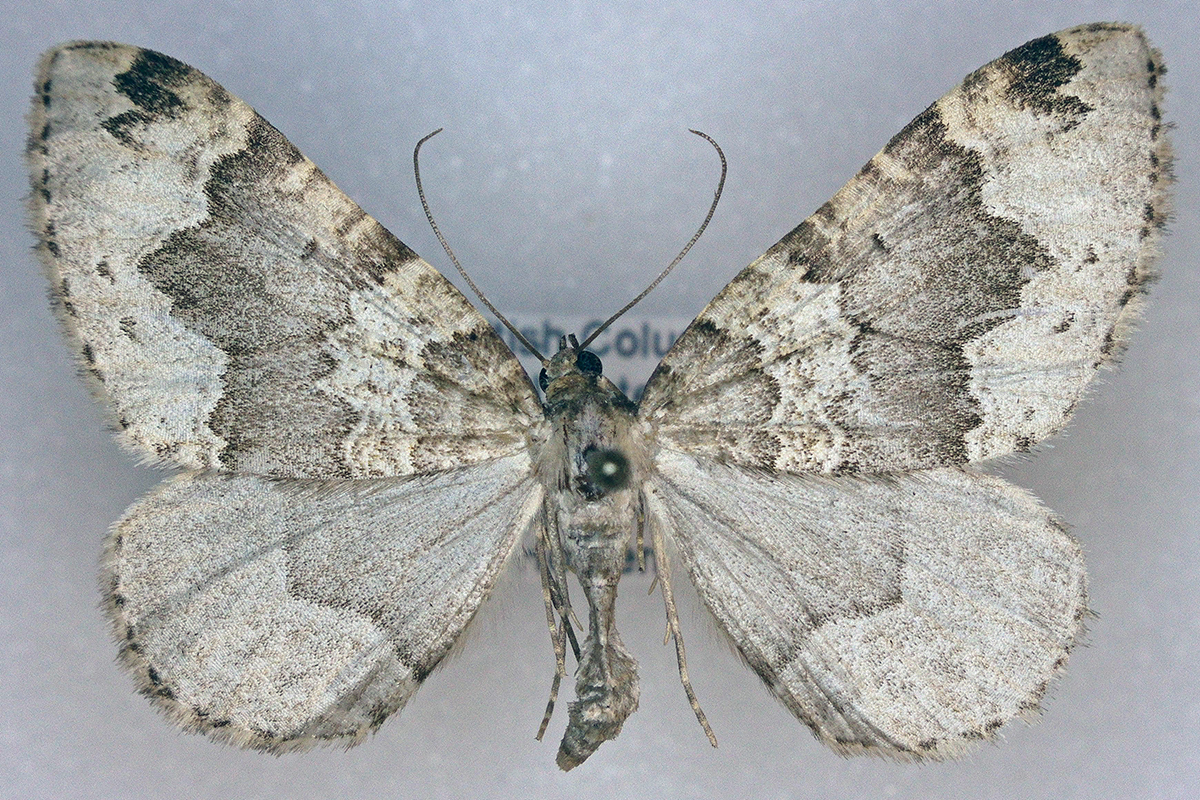

Scientific classification
- Domain: Eukaryota
- Kingdom: Animalia
- Phylum: Arthropoda
- Class: Insecta
- Order: Lepidoptera
- Family: Geometridae
- Genus: Antepirrhoe
- Species: A. atrifasciata

Binomial name
- Antepirrhoe atrifasciata (Hulst, 1888)

= Antepirrhoe atrifasciata =

Species of moth

Antepirrhoe atrifasciata is a species of geometrid moth in the family Geometridae.
