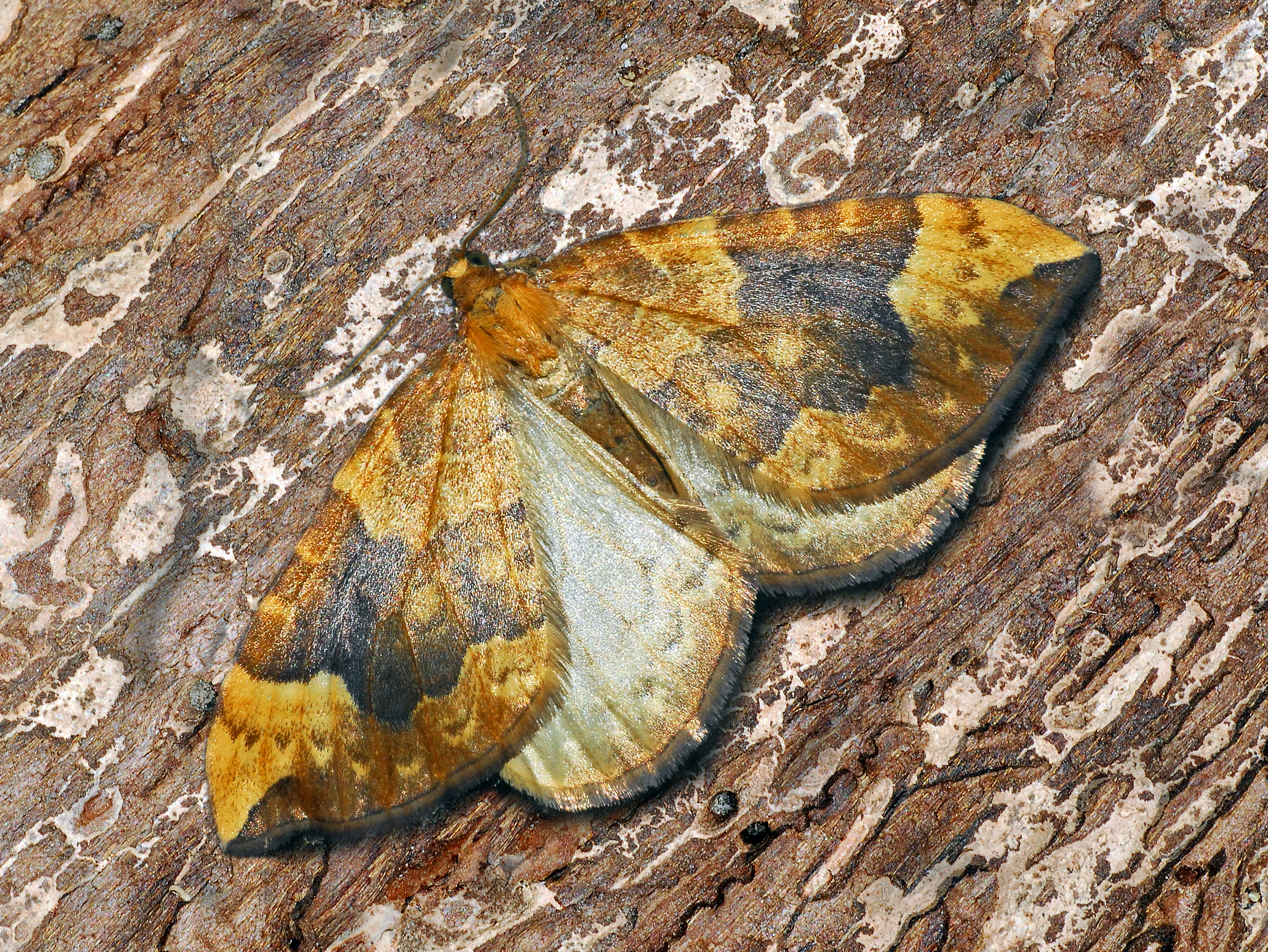

Scientific classification
- Kingdom: Animalia
- Phylum: Arthropoda
- Clade: Pancrustacea
- Class: Insecta
- Order: Lepidoptera
- Family: Geometridae
- Genus: Eulithis
- Species: E. populata

Binomial name
- Eulithis populata (Linnaeus, 1758)

Synonyms
- Eulithis dotata (Linnaeus, 1758); Eulithis popularia (Boisduval, 1840); Larentia dotata (Linnaeus, 1758); Lygris populata (Linnaeus, 1758); Phalaena populata (Linnaeus, 1758)

= Eulithis populata =

Northern spinach

Species of moth

Eulithis populata, the northern spinach, is a moth of the genus Eulithis in the family Geometridae.

== Etymology ==
The species name populata derives from the Latin word populus, meaning poplar, as a food plant for the caterpillar.

== Distribution and habitat ==
Eulithis populata is a Holarctic species found in North America, Europe, the Caucasus, Transcaucasia, the Urals, Siberia, Russian Far East, and North Mongolia. These moths usually inhabits blueberry and mixed forests, peat moorland, wetlands and grassland. The altitude distribution reaches up to 2500 meters in the Alps and up to 2300 meters in the Pyrenees.

== Description ==
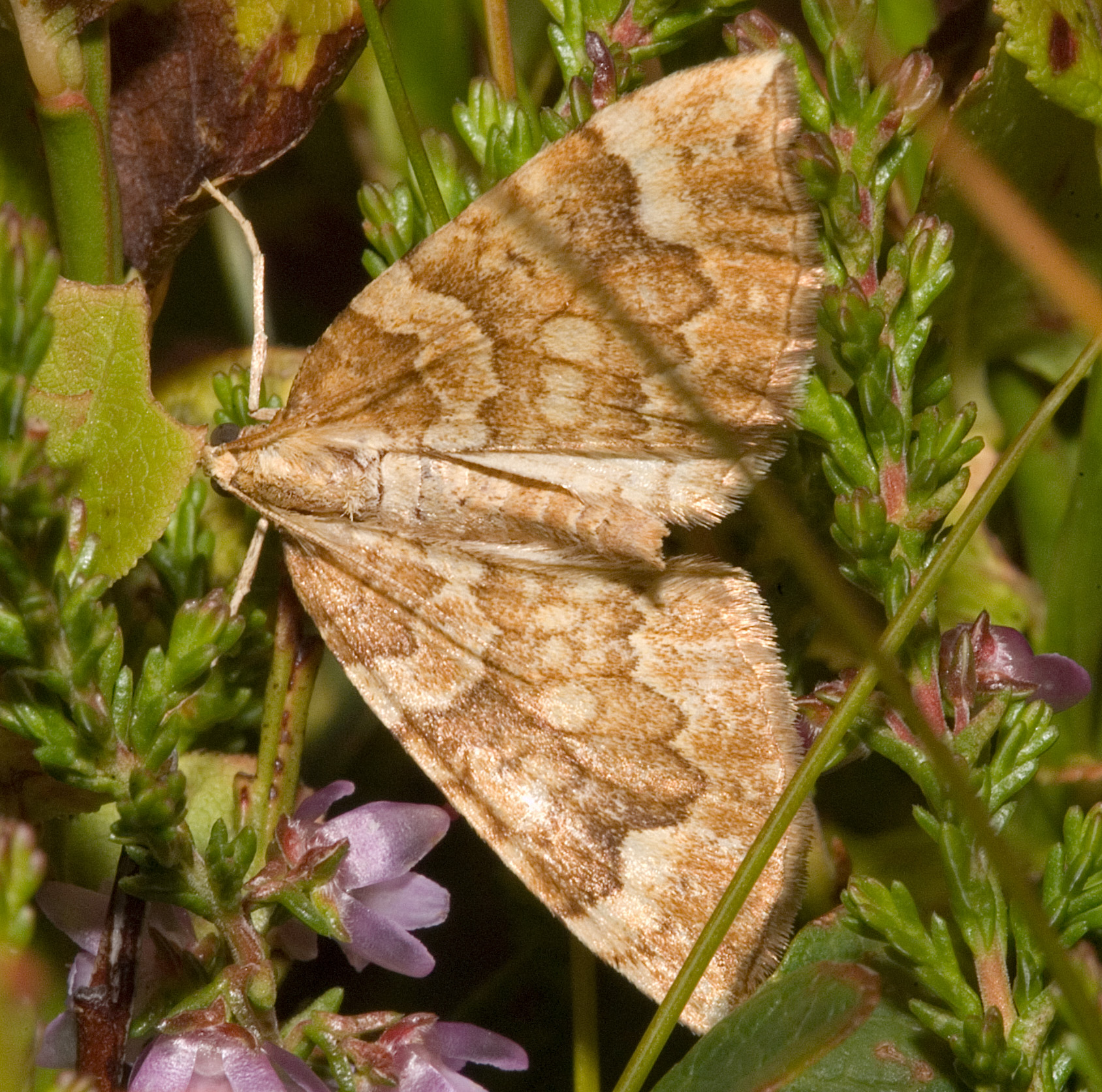
Eulithis populata

The wingspan is 25–32 mm. The ground colour of the forewings is yellow (varying in ground colour from a straw yellow to orange-brown or dark brown). There is a brown central band and a brown basal patch. There is a W shaped projection on the cross band.

Adult caterpillars are extraordinarily variable in colour and have a whitish, yellowish, greenish, brownish, blackish or reddish colour. They are most likely to be recognized by the dark dorsal line located on the front segments, also the dark wedge spots on the posterior segments as well as the distinct annular brown thickening of the second body segment.

These moths are rather similar to Eulithis mellinata and Eulithis pyraliata.

== Biology ==
Eulithis populata is a univoltine species. The species overwinters in the egg stage. The flight period is June to September, in the mountains also until October. These moths are mostly twilight and nocturnal moths, but occasionally they can also be found during the day. In their typical resting position of the adults, the end of the abdomen is bent slightly upwards.

The larvae usually feed on the leaves of blueberry (Vaccinium myrtillus). Alternative food plants are Vaccinium uliginosum, Ribes rubrum, Salix, Betula and Populus tremula. Usually adults can be found in large numbers by sucking on the flowers of Molinia caerulea, Holcus, Juncus conglomeratus and Juncus effusus.

== Gallery ==
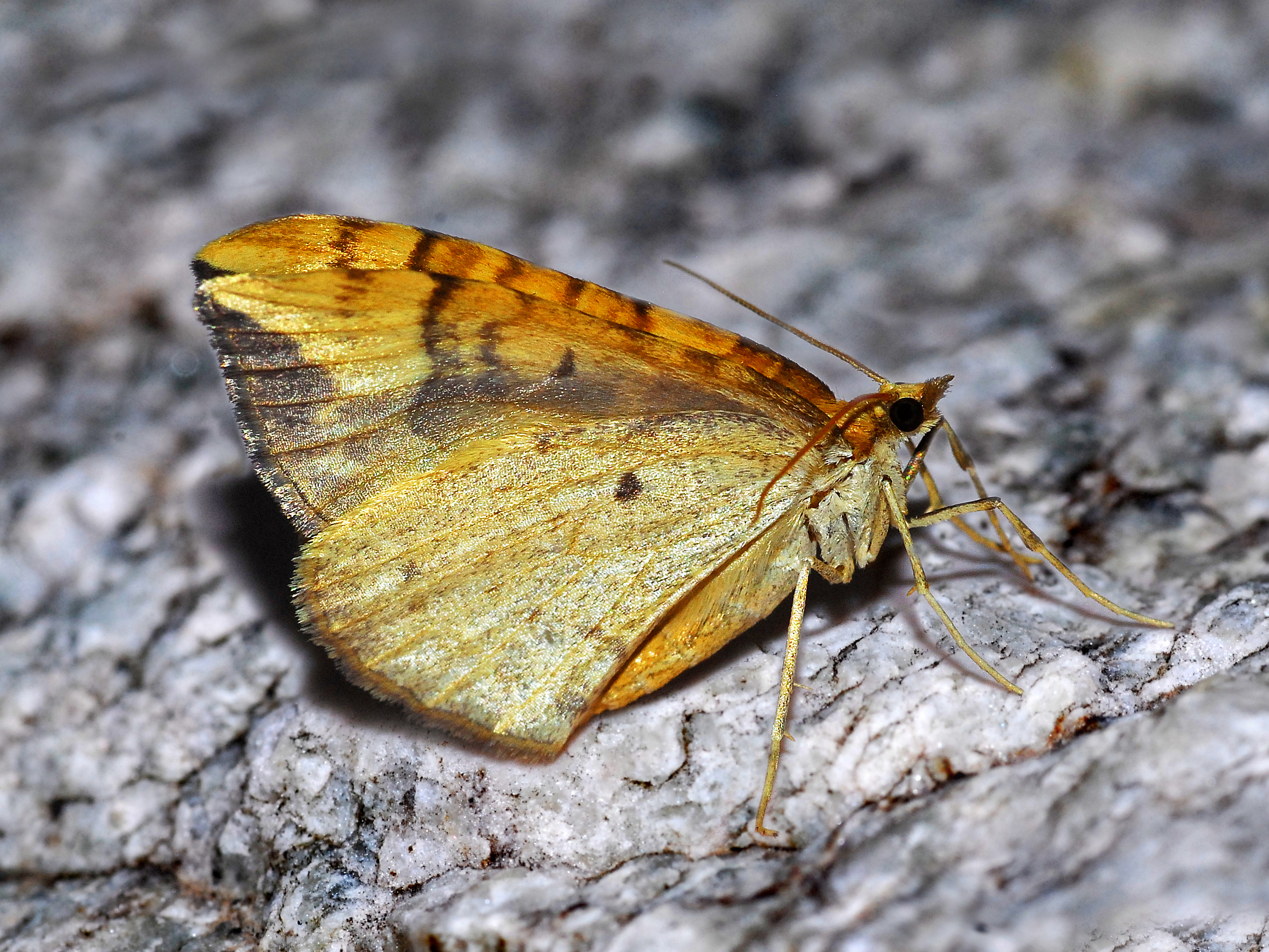
Side view

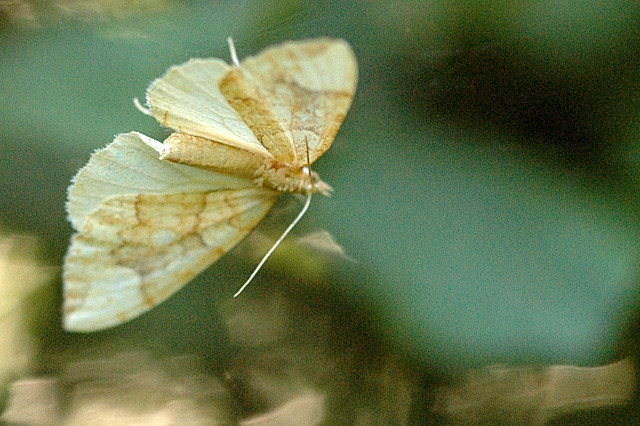
In flight

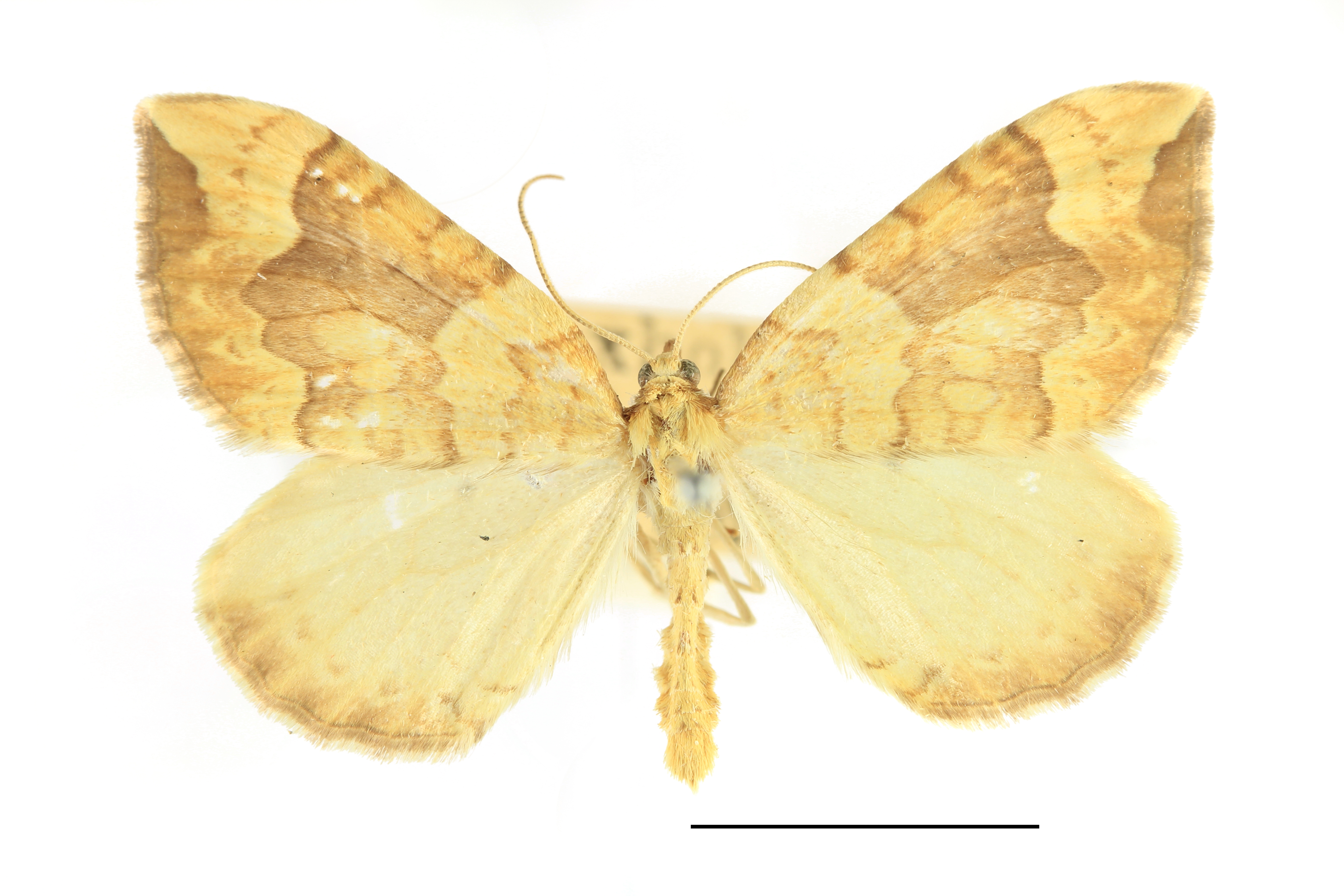
Mounted specimen

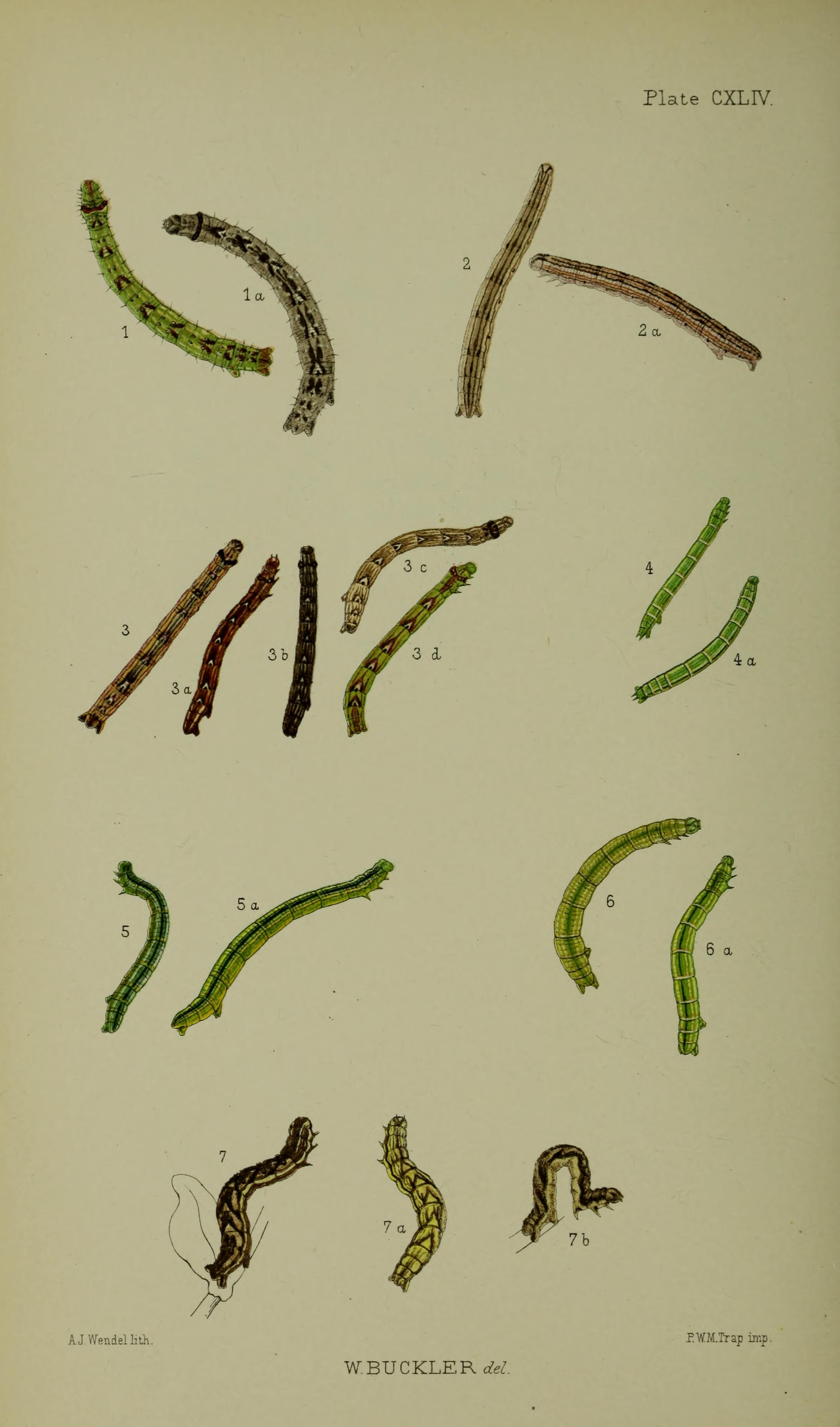
Larvae after final moult
