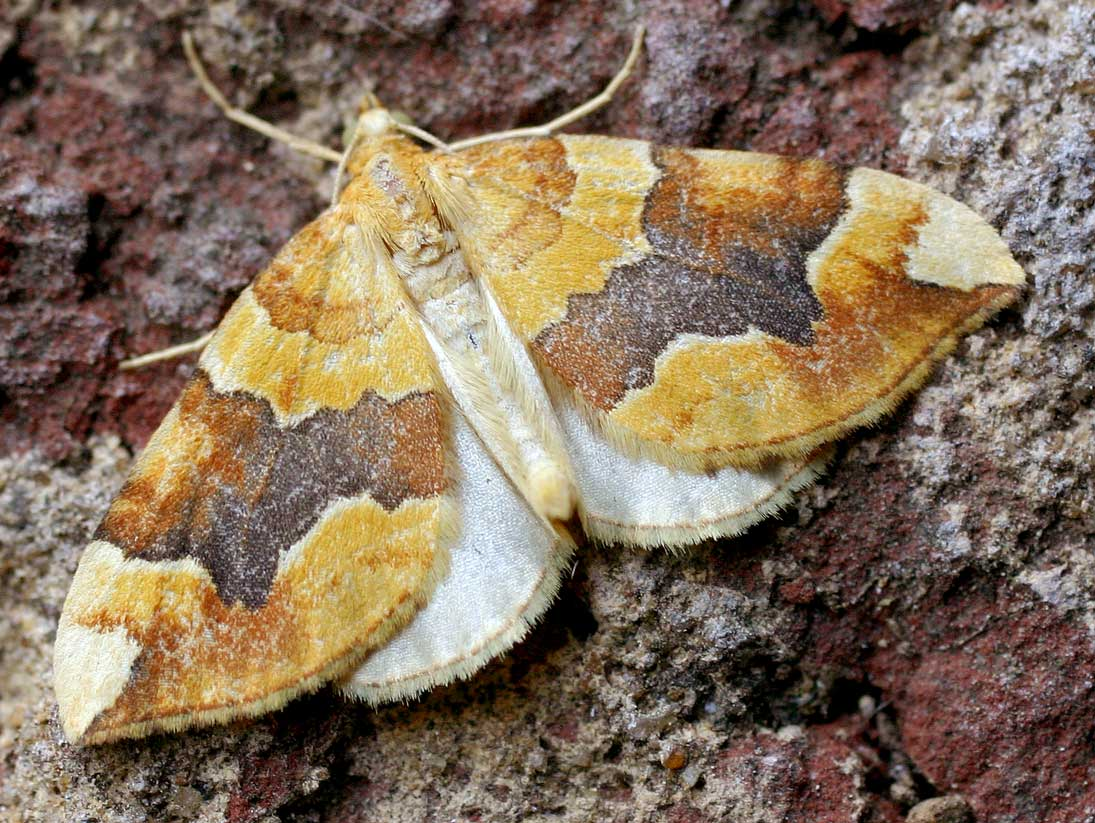
- Cidaria fulvata

Scientific classification
- Domain: Eukaryota
- Kingdom: Animalia
- Phylum: Arthropoda
- Class: Insecta
- Order: Lepidoptera
- Family: Geometridae
- Tribe: Cidariini
- Genus: Cidaria; Treitschke, 1825

= Cidaria =

Genus of moths

Cidaria is a genus of moths in the family Geometridae. It was erected by Georg Friedrich Treitschke in 1825.

== Description ==
Palpi clothed with hair and reaching beyond the slight frontal tuft. Antennae of male typically minutely serrated and fasciculated. Hind tibia with two pairs of spurs. Forewings with vein 3 from near angle of cell and vein 5 from above middle of discocellulars. Vein 6 on or from just above upper angle. Vein 10 anastomosing (fusing) with vein 11 and then with veins 8 and 9 to form the double areole. Hindwings with vein 3 from close to angle of cell. The discocellulars oblique and vein 5 from or from above their middle. Veins 6 and 7 stalked.

== Species ==
- Cidaria antauges Prout, 1938
- Cidaria basharica Bang-Haas, 1927
- Cidaria deletaria Hampson, 1902
- Cidaria distinctata Staudinger, 1892
- Cidaria fulvata (Forster, 1771) – barred yellow
- Cidaria luteata Choi, 1997
- Cidaria nugata Felder, 1875
- Cidaria ochracearia Leech, 1897
- Cidaria ochreata Staudinger, 1895
