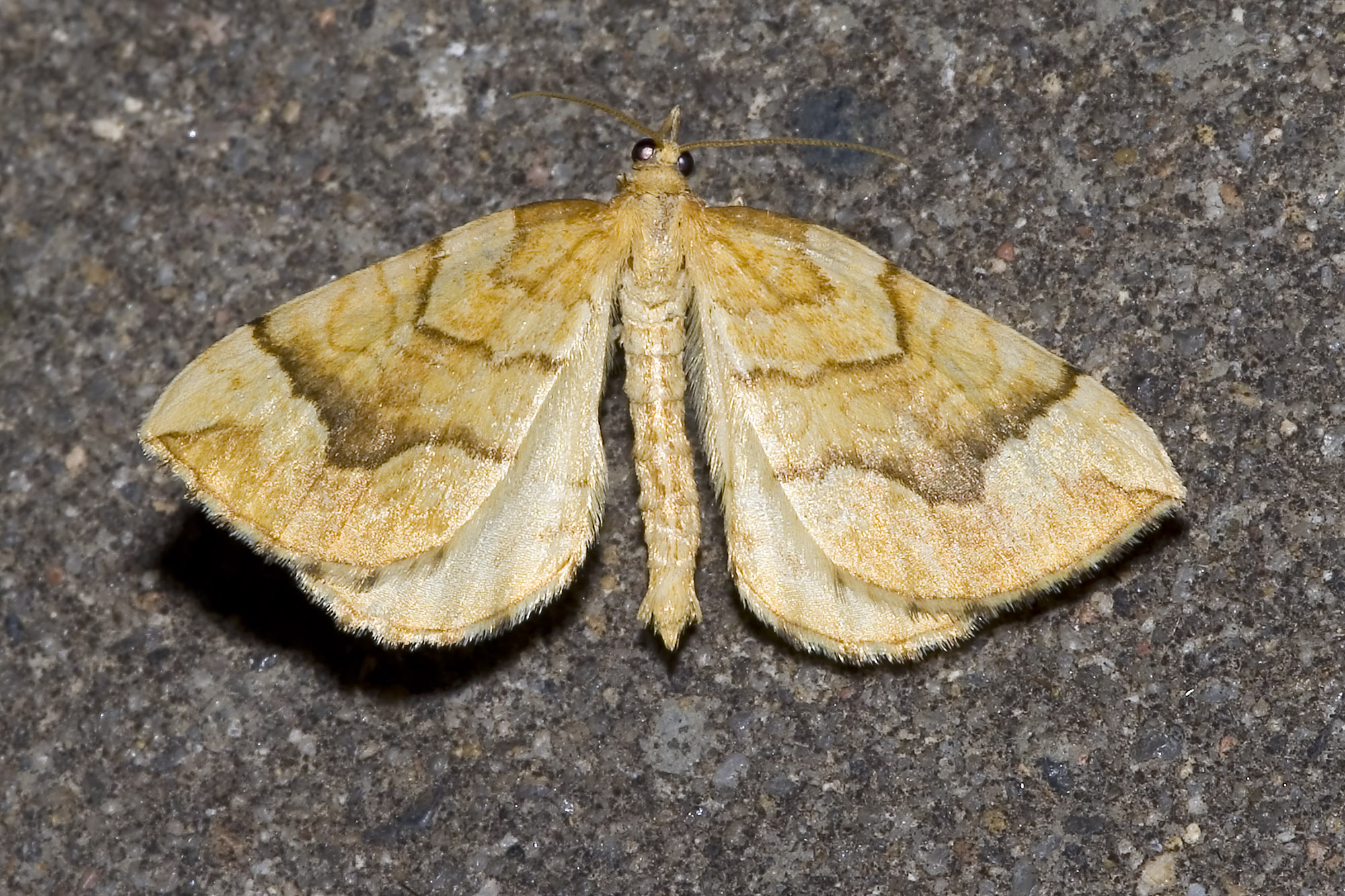

Scientific classification
- Domain: Eukaryota
- Kingdom: Animalia
- Phylum: Arthropoda
- Class: Insecta
- Order: Lepidoptera
- Family: Geometridae
- Genus: Eulithis
- Species: E. mellinata

Binomial name
- Eulithis mellinata (Fabricius, 1787)

Synonyms
- Grandaritis pyraliata

= Spinach (moth) =

Species of moth

The spinach (Eulithis mellinata) is a moth of the family Geometridae. The species was first described by Johan Christian Fabricius in 1787. It is found throughout much of the Palearctic region and the Near East though its distribution is rather local due to its specialized larval food plant. In the British Isles it is fairly common in England and Wales but much rarer in Scotland and Ireland.

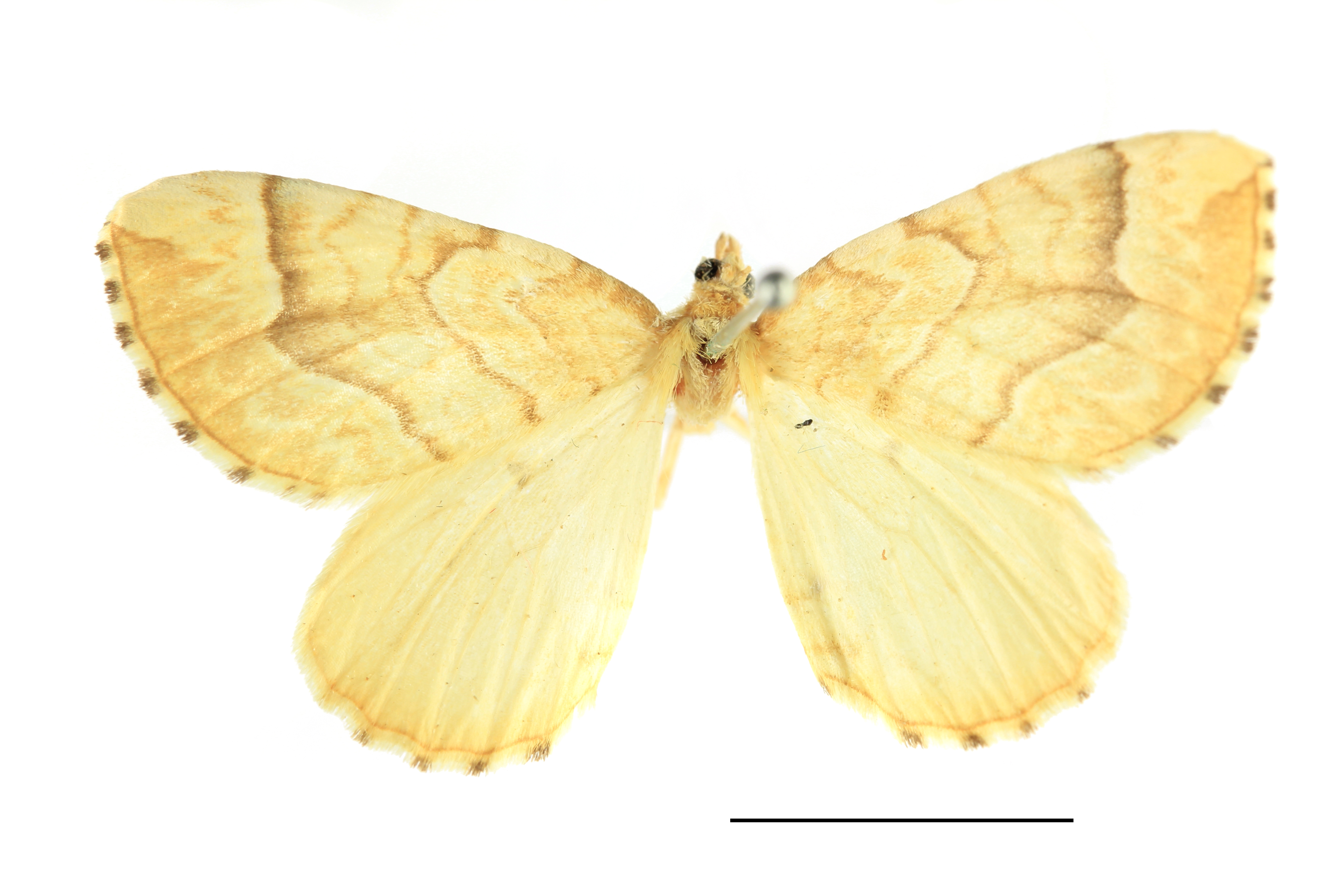
Museum specimen

Its wingspan is 33–38 mm. The forewings are yellow marked with brown fascia and apical streak with brown chequering on the fringe. The ground colour of the forewings is light yellow to honey yellow. The basal field is slightly darkened. The inner brownish transverse line surrounding the central field is sharply bent at right angles under the anterior margin, the strong violet-brown outer transverse line shows a strong jagged bulge towards the margin. There is a brownish dividing line on the apex. On the white-yellow to plain cream hind wings, the transverse lines are almost extinguished. In newly hatched moths, the fringes are alternately light and dark spotted. This feature fades in the case of specimens flown for longer. The hindwings are rarely seen as the species usually rests in a very distinctive and characteristic way with the forewings held out at 90° to the body with the hindwings hidden behind them. Some other members of the genus such as the northern spinach and barred straw rest in a similar way.

The species flies at night from June to August and is attracted to light.

The larva is green with white lines and feeds exclusively on currants. The species overwinters as an egg.

1. The flight season refers to the British Isles. This may vary in other parts of the range.
