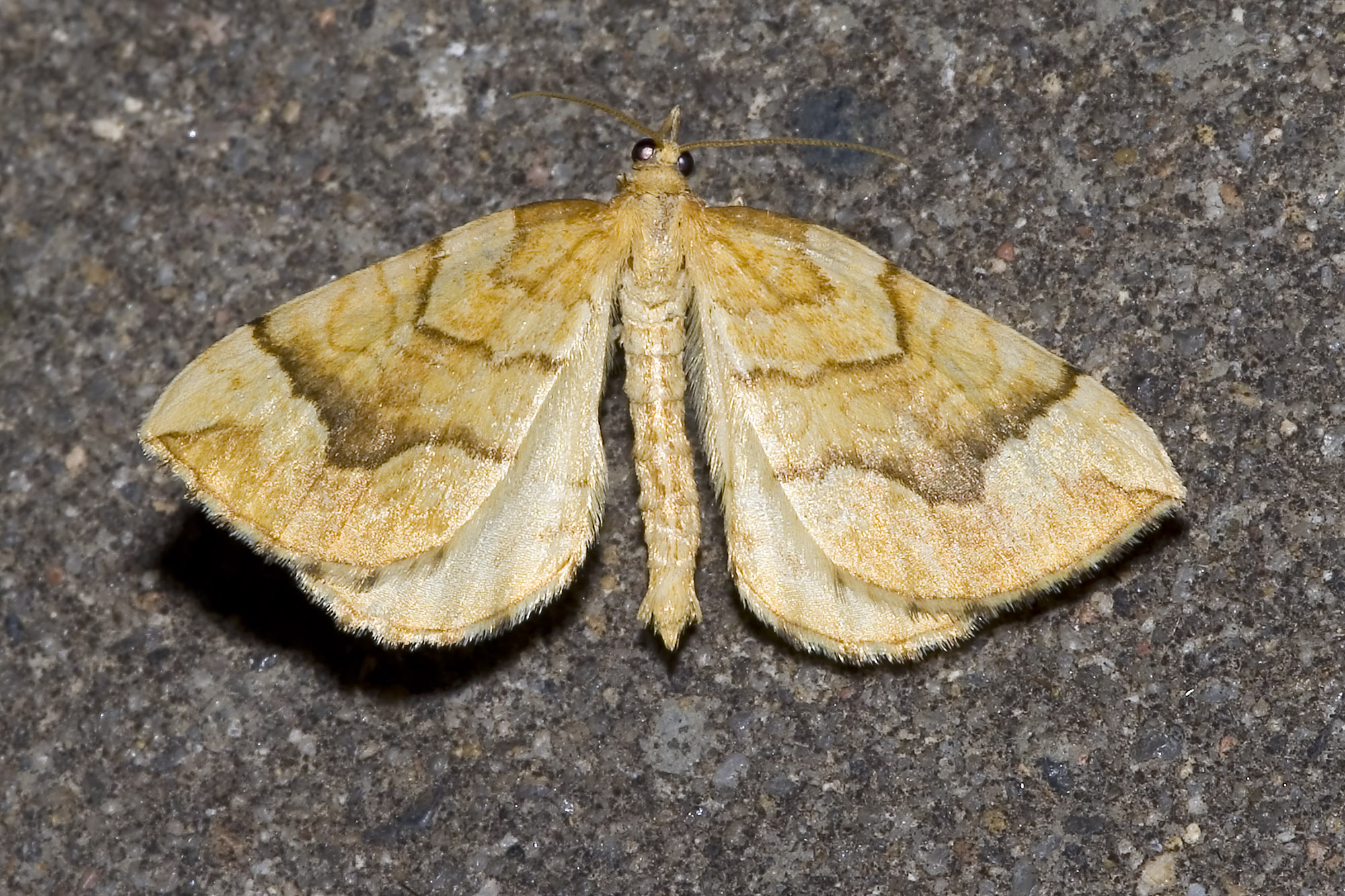
- Eulithis mellinata

Scientific classification
- Kingdom: Animalia
- Phylum: Arthropoda
- Clade: Pancrustacea
- Class: Insecta
- Order: Lepidoptera
- Family: Geometridae
- Tribe: Cidariini
- Genus: Eulithis; Hübner, 1821

Synonyms
- Lygris Hübner, 1825; Neolexia Hulst, 1896; Phylace Hulst, 1896

= Eulithis =

Genus of moths

Eulithis is a Holarctic genus of moths in the family Geometridae erected by Jacob Hübner in 1821.

== Species ==
- Eulithis achatinellaria (Oberthür, 1880)
- Eulithis albicinctata (Püngeler, 1909)
- Eulithis convergenata (Bremer, 1864)
- Eulithis destinata (Moschler, 1860)
- Eulithis diversilineata (Hübner, [1813]) – lesser grapevine looper
- Eulithis explanata (Walker, 1862)
- Eulithis flavibrunneata (McDunnough, 1943)
- Eulithis gracilineata (Guenée, 1858) – greater grapevine looper
- Eulithis ledereri (Bremer, 1864)
- Eulithis ludovica (Oberthür, 1899)
- Eulithis luteolata (Hulst, 1896)
- Eulithis mellinata (Fabricius, 1787) – spinach
- Eulithis molliculata (Walker, 1862)
- Eulithis peloponnesiaca (Rebel, 1902)
- Eulithis perspicuata (Püngeler, 1909)
- Eulithis phylaca (Dyar, 1916)
- Eulithis populata (Linnaeus, 1758) – northern spinach
- Eulithis propulsata (Walker, 1862)
- Eulithis prunata (Linnaeus, 1758) – phoenix
- Eulithis pulchraria (Leech, 1897)
- Eulithis pyropata (Hübner, 1809)
- Eulithis roessleraria (Staudinger, 1870)
- Eulithis serrataria (Barnes & McDunnough, 1917)
- Eulithis testata (Linnaeus, 1761) – chevron
- Eulithis xylina (Hulst, 1896)
