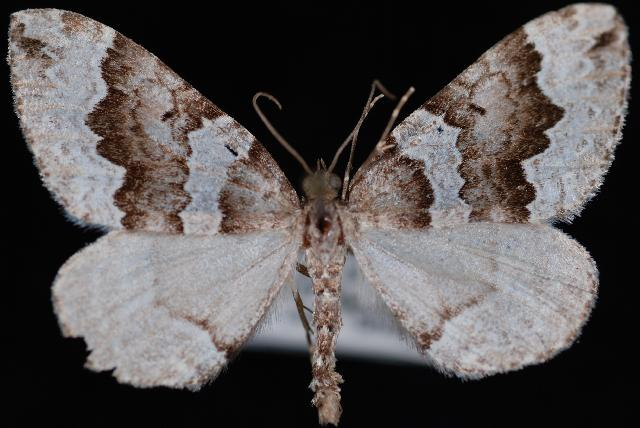

Scientific classification
- Domain: Eukaryota
- Kingdom: Animalia
- Phylum: Arthropoda
- Class: Insecta
- Order: Lepidoptera
- Family: Geometridae
- Genus: Antepirrhoe
- Species: A. fasciata

Binomial name
- Antepirrhoe fasciata (Barnes & McDunnough, 1918)

Synonyms
- Eustroma fasciata Barnes & McDunnough, 1918

= Antepirrhoe fasciata =

Species of moth

Antepirrhoe fasciata is a species of moth in the family Geometridae first described by William Barnes and James Halliday McDunnough in 1918. It is found in North America.

The MONA or Hodges number for Antepirrhoe fasciata is 7211.
