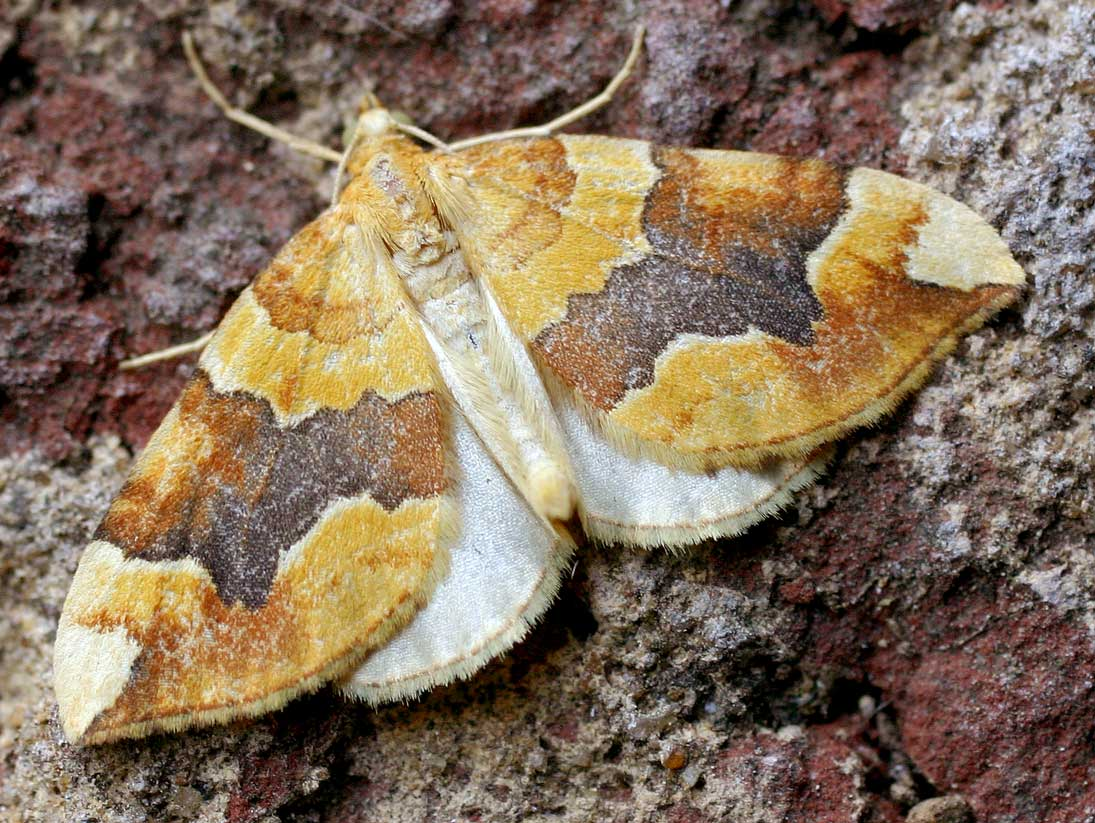

Scientific classification
- Domain: Eukaryota
- Kingdom: Animalia
- Phylum: Arthropoda
- Class: Insecta
- Order: Lepidoptera
- Family: Geometridae
- Genus: Cidaria
- Species: C. fulvata

Binomial name
- Cidaria fulvata (Forster, 1771)

Synonyms
- Phalaena fulvata Forster, 1771

= Cidaria fulvata =

Barred yellow

Species of moth

Cidaria fulvata, the barred yellow, is a moth of the family Geometridae. The species is widespread in the Palearctic, in the west from Spain and France to the British Isles, in the east to the Central Asian mountains, to the Amur and to Kamchatka, in the south of Italy via the Balkan countries, Asia Minor, the Caucasus, the Caspian region as far as the Pamir Mountains and northern India as well as in the north as far as Fennoscandia. The habitats include rocky slopes, heaths and wasteland as well as gardens and parks.

The wingspan is 20–25 mm. The forewing have yellow or ochre ground colour. There is a wide rust cross band which is traversed by violet-gray. This is jagged towards the margin and has thin cream line edges, connected along the costa to a triangular cream stain at the apex. The hindwings are plain whitish yellow. The larva is rather long and slender with 2 well developed anal points, bluer green dorsally, yellower green ventrally, with yellow lateral line. The head is rather small and the prothorax slightly swollen. The pupa spun by a few threads among leaves is bright yellow green, wings more grass-green. The dorsal line is scarcely darkened and there is a whitish subdorsal. The cremaster is reddish.

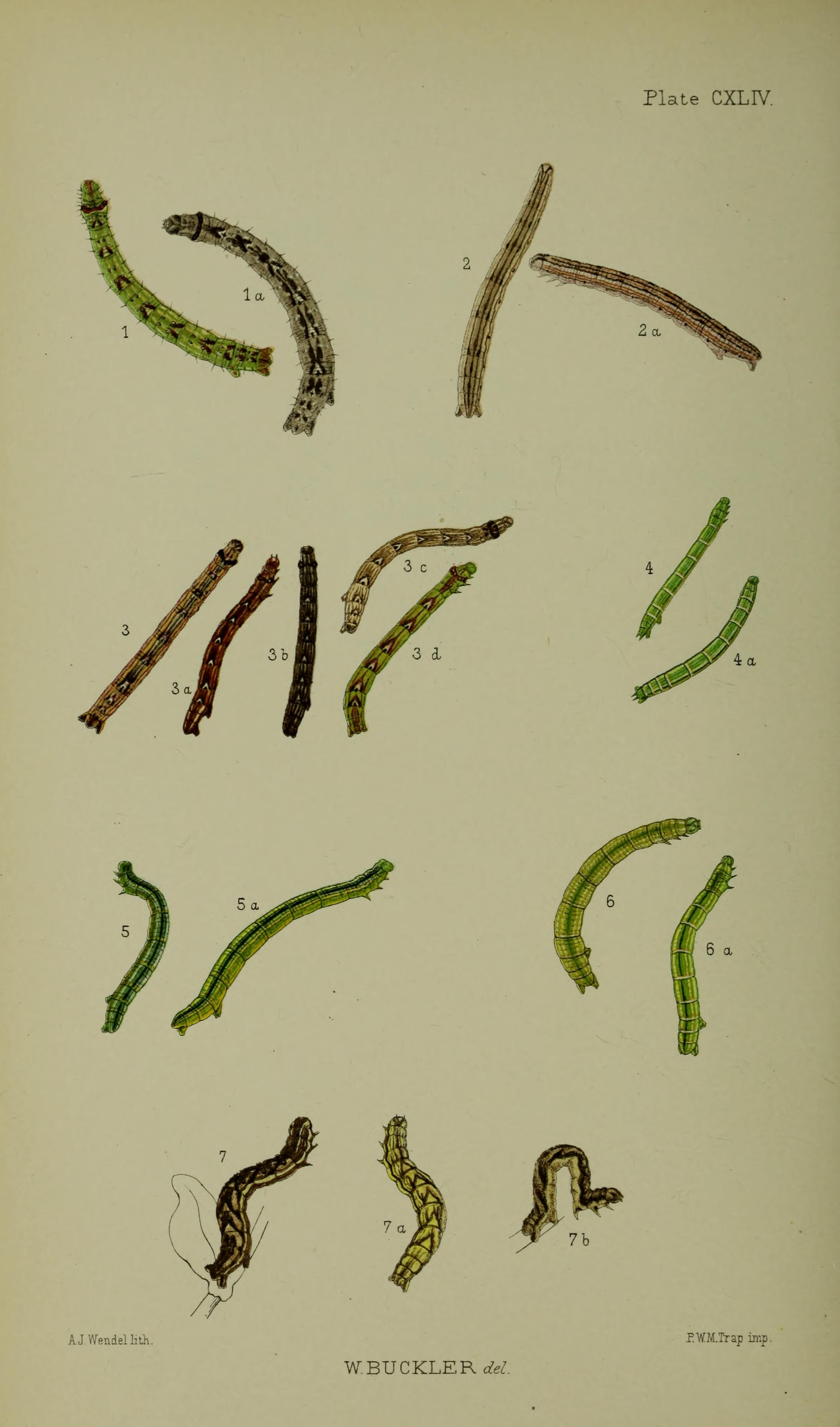
Figs.4,4a larvae after final moult

The moths fly from June to July. The species prefers woodland, chalk downland and scrubland.

The larvae feed on dog rose.

== Notes ==
1. The flight season refers to the British Isles. This may vary in other parts of the range.
