= Eulithis explanata =

Scientific classification
- Kingdom: Animalia
- Phylum: Arthropoda
- Clade: Pancrustacea
- Class: Insecta
- Order: Lepidoptera
- Family: Geometridae
- Genus: Eulithis
- Species: E. explanata

Binomial name
- Eulithis explanata (Walker, 1862)

Species of moth

Eulithis explanata, the White eulithis, is a species of geometrid moth in the family Geometridae. It is found in North America.

The MONA or Hodges number for Eulithis explanata is 7206.

== Larvae ==
The larvae of E. explanata are described in the US Forest Service booklets,

"Geometroid caterpillars of northeastern and Appalachian forests" as a caterpillar having an "elongate brown to green body [that is] stoutest about the hind segments. The heart is visible as a darkened middorsal stripe. Each abdominal segment may have a pair of short, oblique, dark lines extending back and away from the posterior dorsal seta. The setal bases are lightened. Brownish spots on the head are concentrated over the midline and over the lobes. The spiracles are blackened."

Mature larvae are 3 cm long. Larvae feed on the leaves of blueberry (Vaccinium).

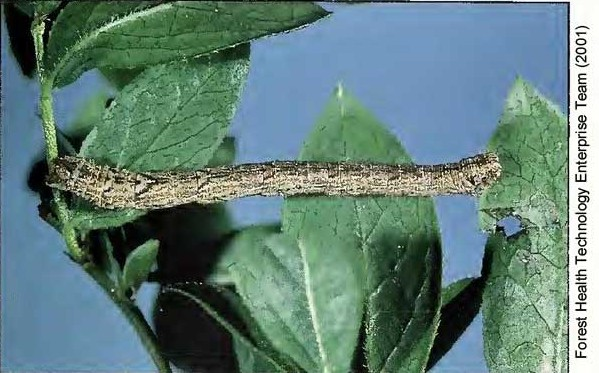
Eulithis explanata moth

== External links with photos ==
- Bug Guide
- iNaturalist
- Moth Photographers Group
