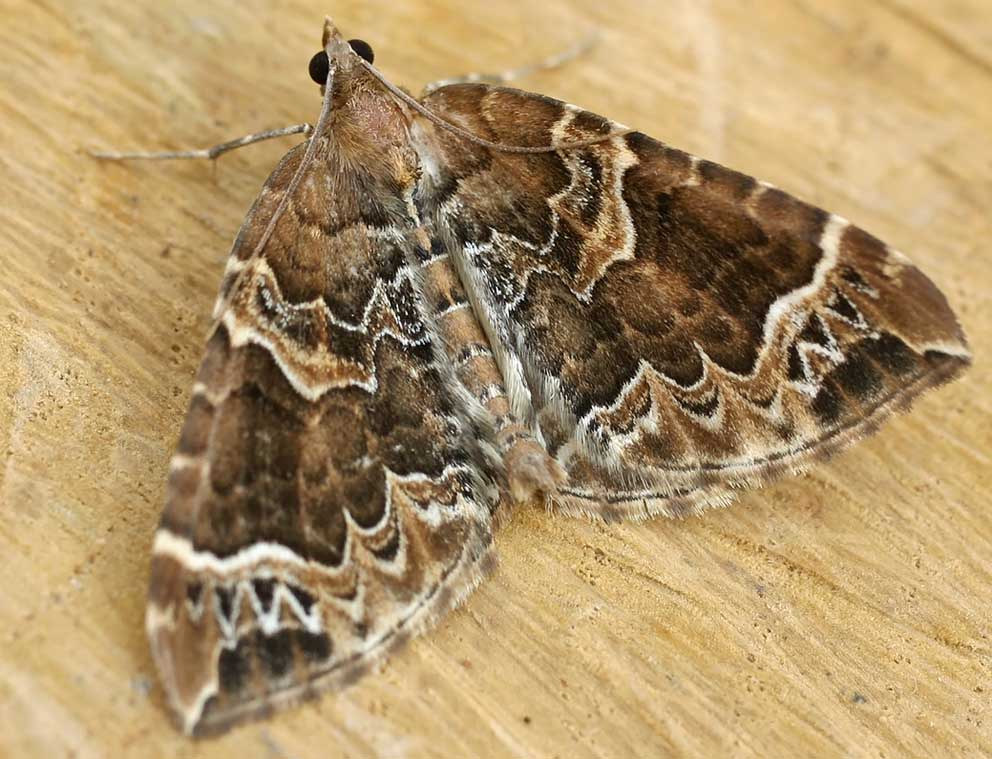

Scientific classification
- Kingdom: Animalia
- Phylum: Arthropoda
- Class: Insecta
- Order: Lepidoptera
- Family: Geometridae
- Genus: Eulithis
- Species: E. prunata

Binomial name
- Eulithis prunata (Linnaeus, 1758)

= Eulithis prunata =

Phoenix

Species of moth

Eulithis prunata, the phoenix, is a moth of the genus Eulithis in the family Geometridae.

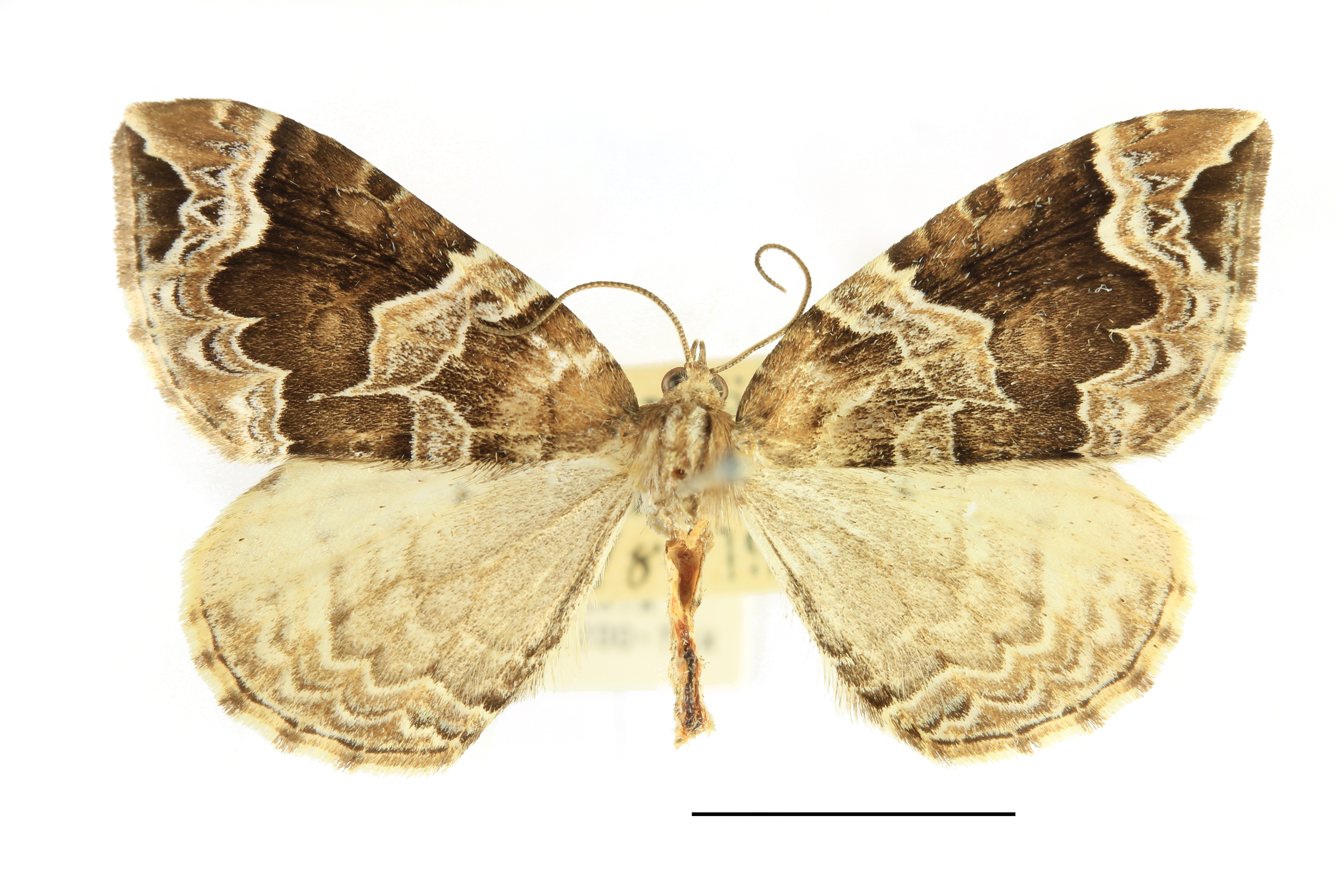
Museum specimen

== Description ==
The moth has a wingspan of about 28 to 37 mm. The ground colour of the forewing is dark brown. The midfield is bordered by grey-white or brown-white cross bands on both sides and shows a strong point-shaped bulge outward. On the distal white wavy line, there are several black arrow stains contrasted with white. Below the apex, there is a large, dark, crescent-shaped spot located. Three bright wavy lines are visible on the grey rear wings.

== Distribution ==
It's found in the Palearctic realm.

== Subspecies ==
- Eulithis prunata prunata (Europe)
- Eulithis prunata leucoptera (Kamchatka, the Amur region, Sakhalin, Korea, Japan)
- Eulithis prunata teberdensis (Caucasus, Georgia, Armenia)

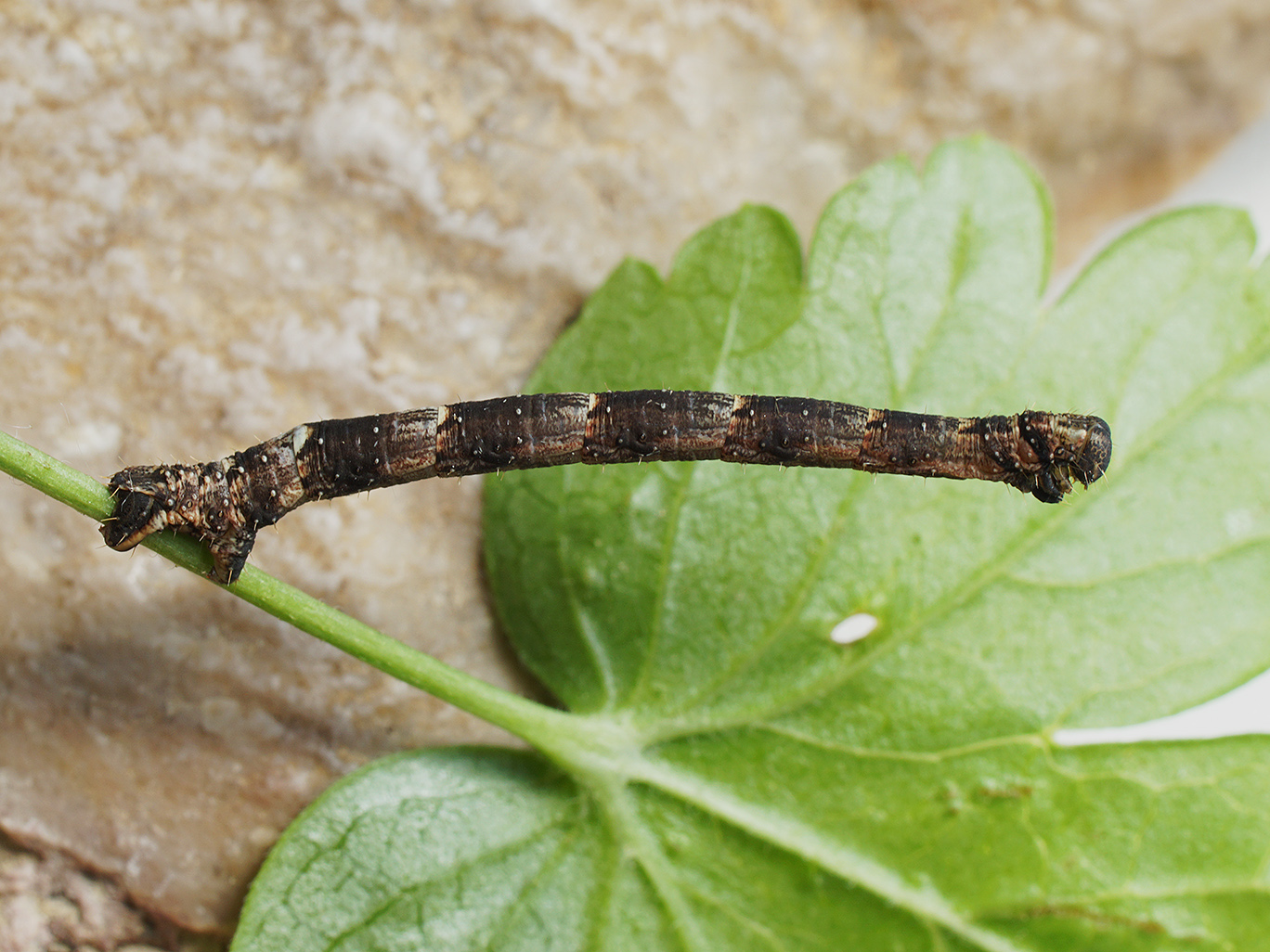
Larva Moscow Oblast

== Biology ==
=== Larval food plants ===
The larvae feed on currant bushes of the genus Ribes, including Alpine Currant, Blackcurrant, Gooseberry, Redcurrant and Ribes aureum. Ornamental member of the genus may also be hosts.
