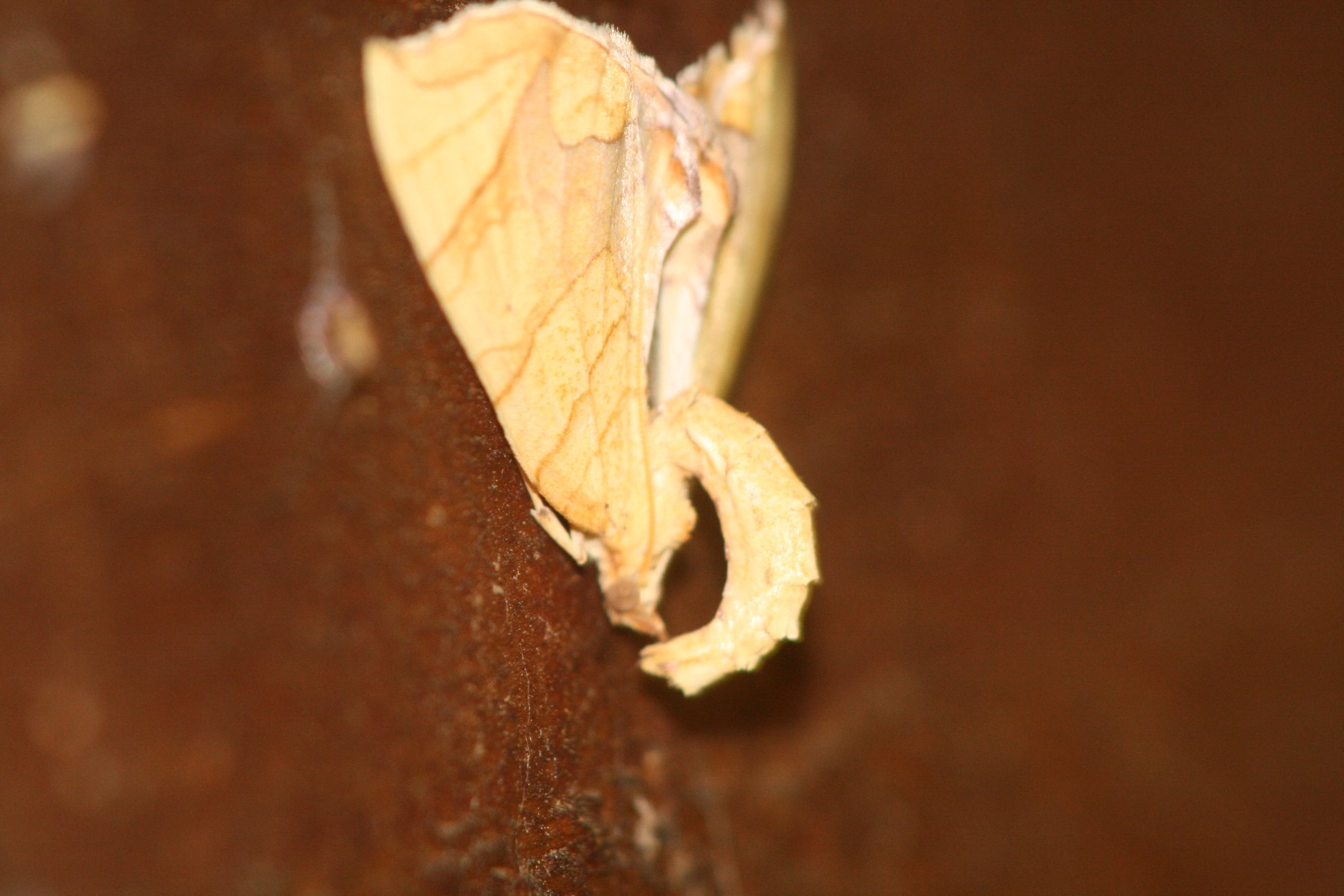

Scientific classification
- Domain: Eukaryota
- Kingdom: Animalia
- Phylum: Arthropoda
- Class: Insecta
- Order: Lepidoptera
- Family: Geometridae
- Genus: Eulithis
- Species: E. gracilineata

Binomial name
- Eulithis gracilineata (Guenée, 1858)

= Eulithis gracilineata =

Greater grapevine looper

Species of moth

Eulithis gracilineata, the greater grapevine looper, is a moth of the family Geometridae. The species was first described by Achille Guenée in 1858. It is found from eastern Canada south to Florida. It has also been collected west to Saskatchewan and central Alberta, where it is rare.

The wingspan is 35–40 mm.

The larvae feed on Vitis and Parthenocissus species.
