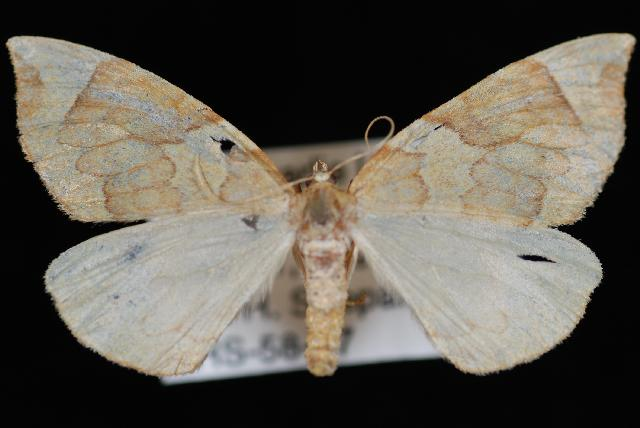

Scientific classification
- Kingdom: Animalia
- Phylum: Arthropoda
- Clade: Pancrustacea
- Class: Insecta
- Order: Lepidoptera
- Family: Geometridae
- Genus: Eulithis
- Species: E. propulsata

Binomial name
- Eulithis propulsata (Walker, 1862)

= Eulithis propulsata =

Species of moth

Eulithis propulsata, known generally as the Barred yellow or Currant eulithis moth, is a species of geometrid moth in the family Geometridae. It is found in North America.The MONA or Hodges number for Eulithis propulsata is 7199.

== Distribution ==
This species has a broad range across most of North America, with populations in Alaska, northwestern Canada, and all of the states/providence along the Canadian-US border. It is found in wooded habitats including boreal and cordilleran ecoregions. Adults are seen from June to August.

== Larvae ==
The larvae feed on Currents, as well as pants in the genues Abies, Populus, Ribes, Salix, and Tsuga. In the southern Appalachians there is one generation with mature caterpillars from May into early July. Mature larvae are 3 cm.

== External links with photos ==
- Bug Guide
- iNaturalist
- Moth Photographers Group

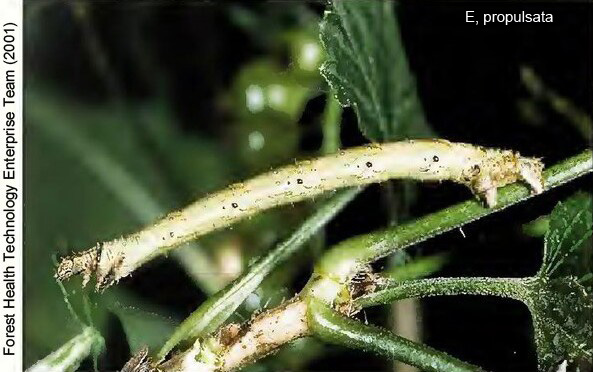
Eulithis propulsata caterpillar
