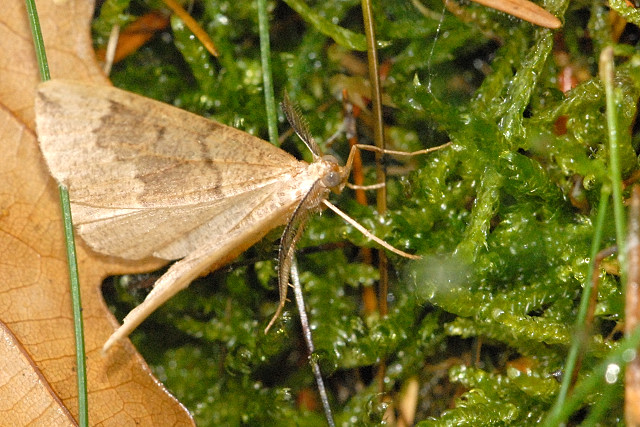

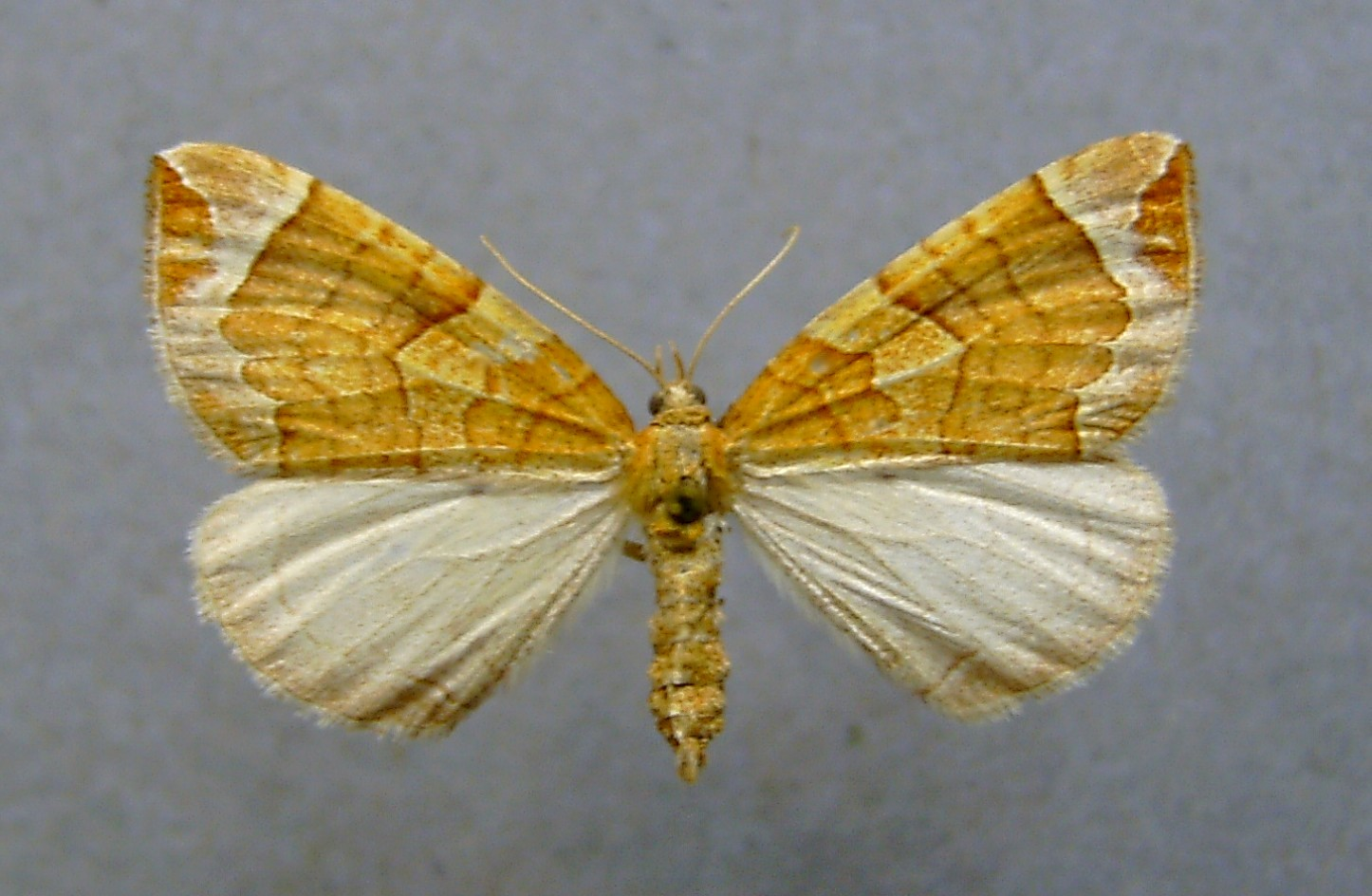

Scientific classification
- Kingdom: Animalia
- Phylum: Arthropoda
- Class: Insecta
- Order: Lepidoptera
- Family: Geometridae
- Genus: Eulithis
- Species: E. testata

Binomial name
- Eulithis testata (Linnaeus, 1761)

Synonyms
- Eulithis colorata (Fabricius, 1794); Eulithis achatinata (Hübner, 1796-99); Eulithis achantinaria (Boisduval, 1840); Eulithis insulicola Staudinger, 1901

= Eulithis testata =

Chevron

Species of moth

Eulithis testata, the chevron, is a moth of the family Geometridae. The species was first described by Carl Linnaeus in 1761. It is found in both the Palearctic and the Nearctic realms. In the Palearctic it ranges from Great Britain and Scandinavia, south to the Alps, east through Russia and the Russian Far East to Japan. In North America, it is found from Newfoundland to Vancouver Island and Alaska, south in the east to about New Jersey and in the west to Colorado.

The specific name testata is derived from the Latin testa (baked stone) and refers to the base color of the wing.

== Description ==
The wingspan is 25–35 mm.. The forewings show a variety of ground colors ranging from pale yellow through orange yellow, reddish yellow to brown yellow, and purple brown. The midfield is always obscured and is bordered by lines, which reveal a significant bend and in addition show a nearly identical, parallel course. There are one or two more crosslines in the midfield, which also have a nearly parallel course, but are however much less developed. In the midfield also the cell stands out, the midfield bulges out and there is dark crossline. The marginal field is often brightened whitish brightened and a wavy line is missing. Below the apex, there is a large, prominent, crescent-shaped spot. The fringes are plain brown. The hindwings shimmer white, the edge is grayish and has an indistinct gray crossline. The larva is a rather pale yellowish brown, often with some tinge of green; weakly marked, the most conspicuous marking being a dark dorsal line.

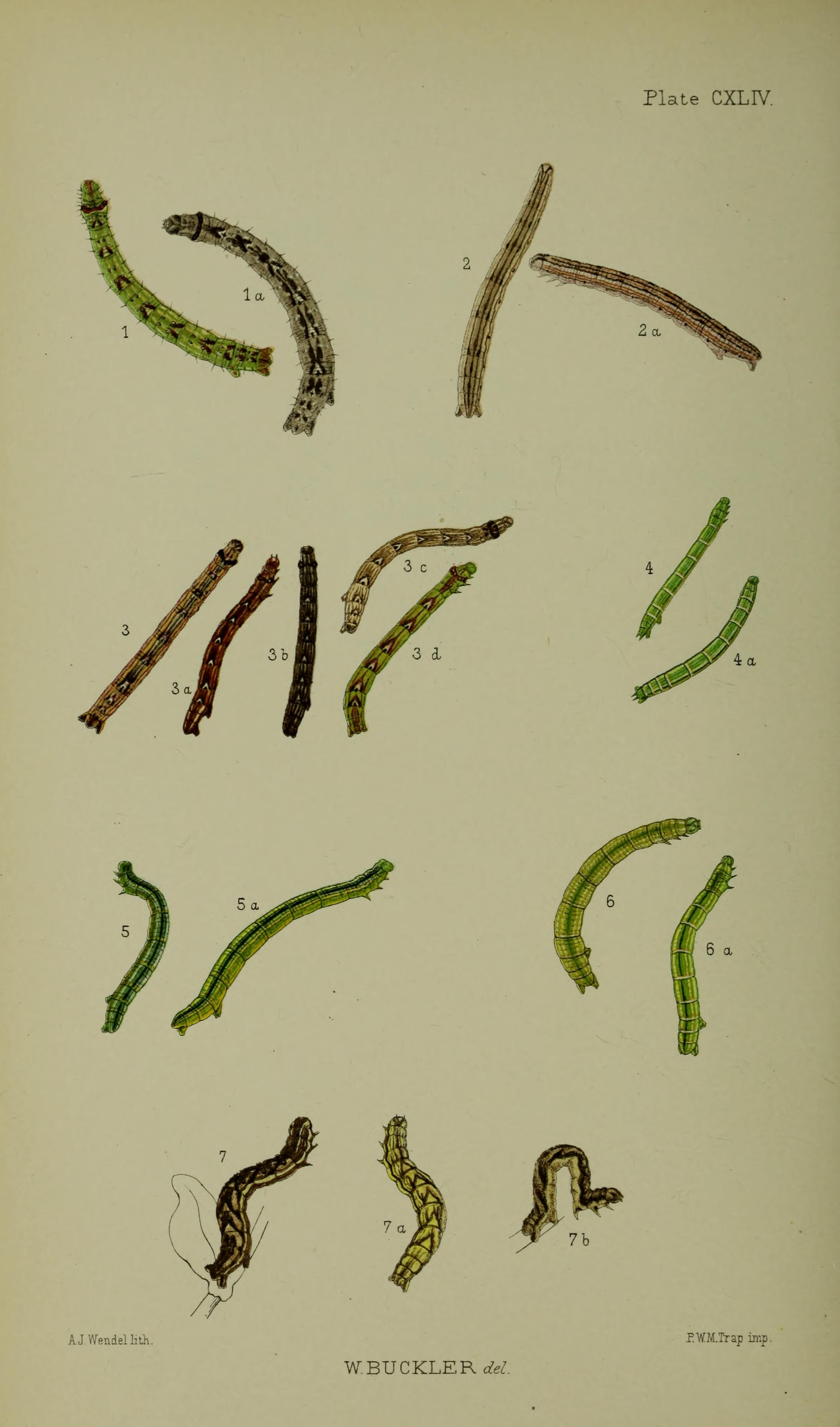
Figs.2, 2a larvae after final moult

Adults are on wing from July to mid-September. There are two generations per year in the Netherlands and only one in the UK and North America.

The larvae feed on Vaccinium, Salix and Populus species (mainly Populus tremula).
