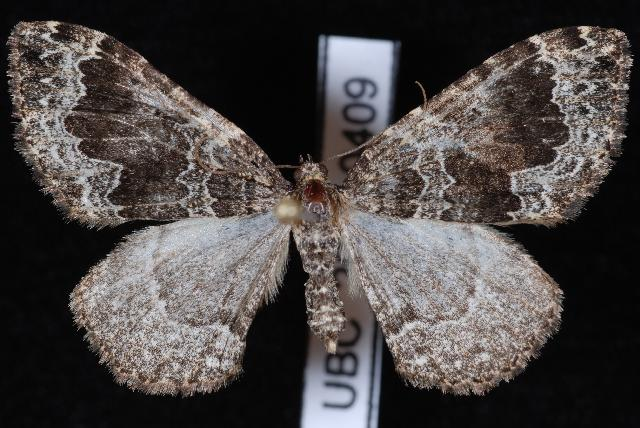

Scientific classification
- Kingdom: Animalia
- Phylum: Arthropoda
- Class: Insecta
- Order: Lepidoptera
- Family: Geometridae
- Genus: Antepirrhoe
- Species: A. semiatrata

Binomial name
- Antepirrhoe semiatrata (Hulst, 1881)

= Antepirrhoe semiatrata =

Species of moth

Antepirrhoe semiatrata, the black-banded carpet moth, is a species of geometrid moth in the family Geometridae.

The MONA or Hodges number for Antepirrhoe semiatrata is 7210.
