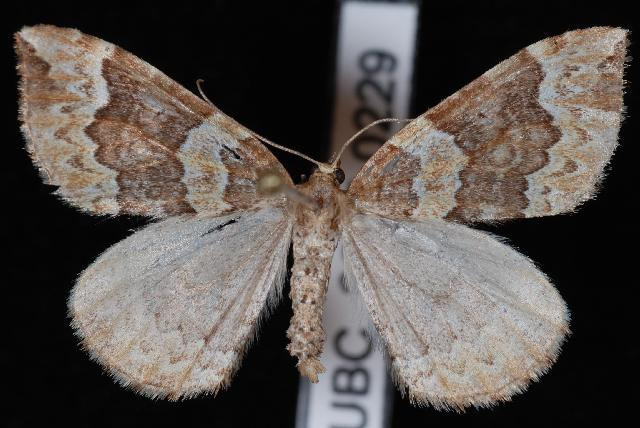

Scientific classification
- Domain: Eukaryota
- Kingdom: Animalia
- Phylum: Arthropoda
- Class: Insecta
- Order: Lepidoptera
- Family: Geometridae
- Genus: Eulithis
- Species: E. destinata

Binomial name
- Eulithis destinata (Moschler, 1860)

= Eulithis destinata =

Species of moth

Eulithis destinata is a species of geometrid moth in the family Geometridae. It is found in North America.

The MONA or Hodges number for Eulithis destinata is 7204.
