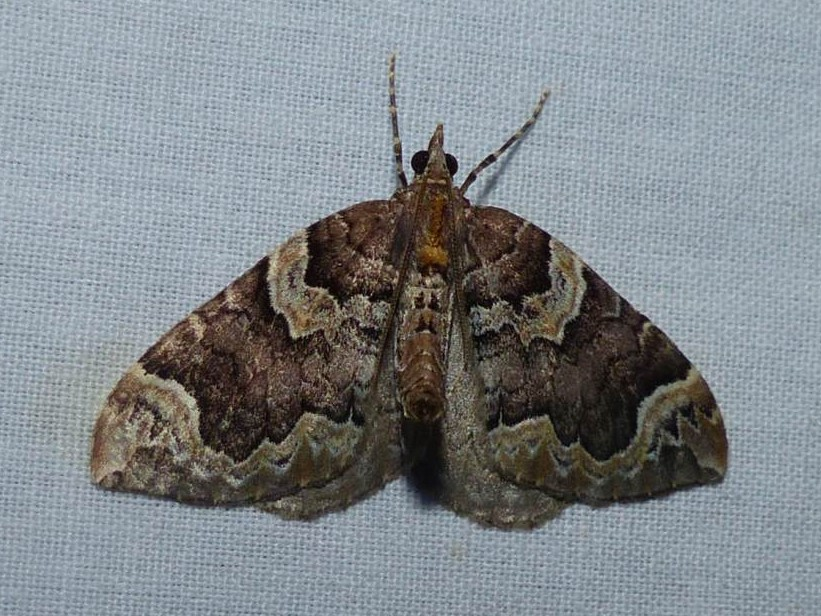

Scientific classification
- Kingdom: Animalia
- Phylum: Arthropoda
- Class: Insecta
- Order: Lepidoptera
- Family: Geometridae
- Genus: Eulithis
- Species: E. serrataria

Binomial name
- Eulithis serrataria (Barnes & McDunnough, 1917)

= Eulithis serrataria =

Species of moth

Eulithis serrataria, commonly known as the serrated eulithis, is a species of moth in the family Geometridae. It was first described by William Barnes and James Halliday McDunnough in 1917 and it is found in North America.
