= Kauaiina molokaiensis =

Scientific classification
- Domain: Eukaryota
- Kingdom: Animalia
- Phylum: Arthropoda
- Class: Insecta
- Order: Lepidoptera
- Family: Geometridae
- Genus: Kauaiina
- Species: K. molokaiensis

Binomial name
- Kauaiina molokaiensis Riotte, 1979

Species of moth

Kauaiina molokaiensis is a moth of the family Geometridae first described by Jules C. E. Riotte in 1979. It is endemic to the Hawaiian island of Molokai, where it was at an altitude of 1,290 meters above Puu Kolekole.

The wingspan is about 31 mm for males and 36 mm for females. Males are dark wine red and females are clay brown.
