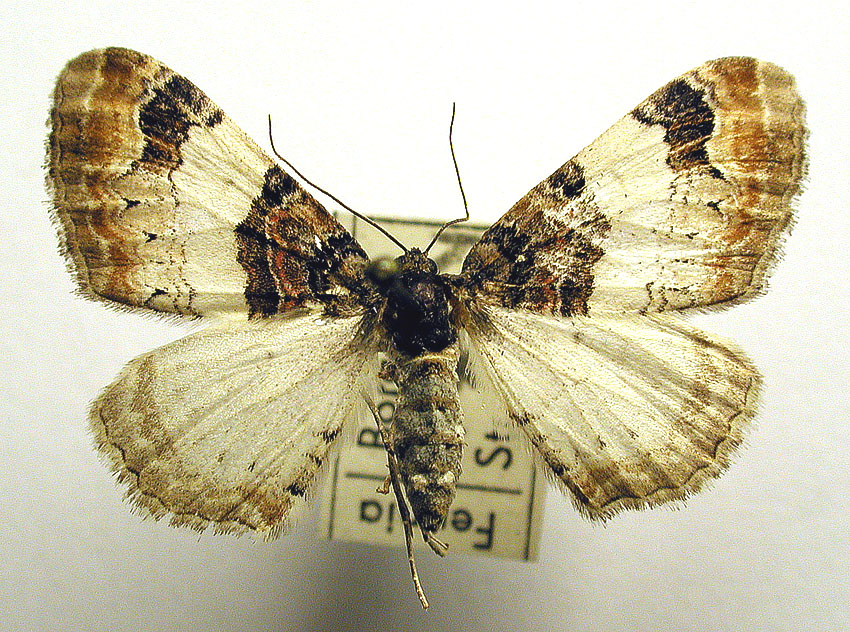

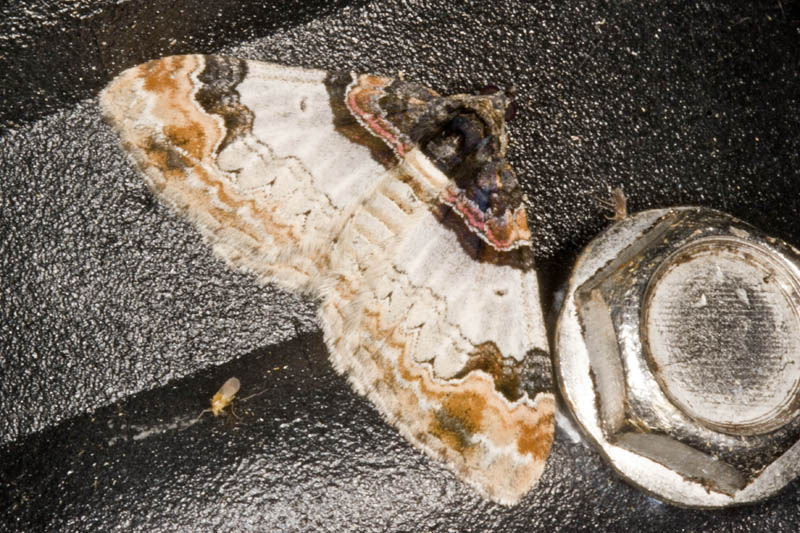

Scientific classification
- Kingdom: Animalia
- Phylum: Arthropoda
- Class: Insecta
- Order: Lepidoptera
- Family: Geometridae
- Genus: Catarhoe
- Species: C. cuculata

Binomial name
- Catarhoe cuculata (Hufnagel, 1767)

Synonyms
- Phalaena cuculata Hufnagel, 1767; Larentia sabinata Dannehl, 1933

= Catarhoe cuculata =

Royal mantle

Species of moth

Catarhoe cuculata, the royal mantle, is a moth of the family Geometridae. The species was first described by Johann Siegfried Hufnagel in 1767. It is found from Europe to western Central Asia and east Siberia. The species prefers to live in light forests and forest edges, but also occurs on meadows.

The wingspan is 22–27 mm. The basic or ground colour of the wings is whitish. The base of the forewing is black with a red-brown band, and at the apex are two reddish-brown stains that pass into a red-brown crossline and a dark brown and black spot (separated by a thin black crossline). The first crossline near the base of the forewing is red with a thick black border. It is characterized by the alternate bands of chestnut and blackish brown in the proximal area, the white median area and the form of the postmedian band— ab. circulata Rbl. is a remarkable and perhaps unique aberration in which the dark bands of the central area are connected on the subcostal and median veins, enclosing a roundish white patch. The larva is green or yellowish with conspicuous blackish or dark purple subdorsal stripes. The pupa is reddish, with browner wings.

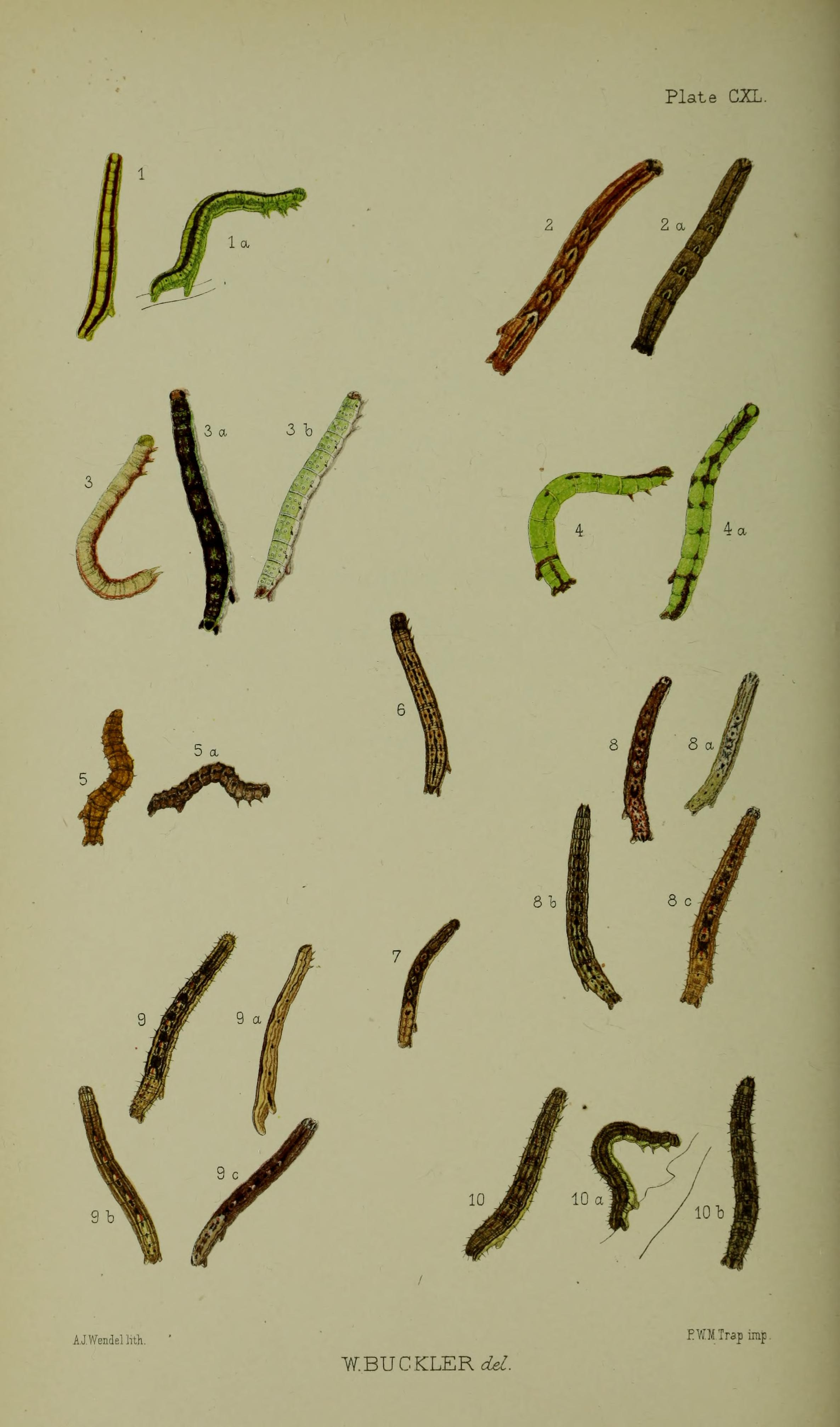
Figs 1, 1a larvae after final moult

Adults are on wing from April to August in one generation.

The larvae feed on Galium species. Larvae can be found in July to September. It overwinters as a pupa.

== Subspecies ==
- Catarhoe cuculata cuculata
- Catarhoe cuculata sabinata Dannehl, 1933
- Catarhoe cuculata undulosa (Warnecke, 1934)

== Similar species ==
- Mesoleuca albicillata
- Melanthia procellata
- Catarhoe rubidata
