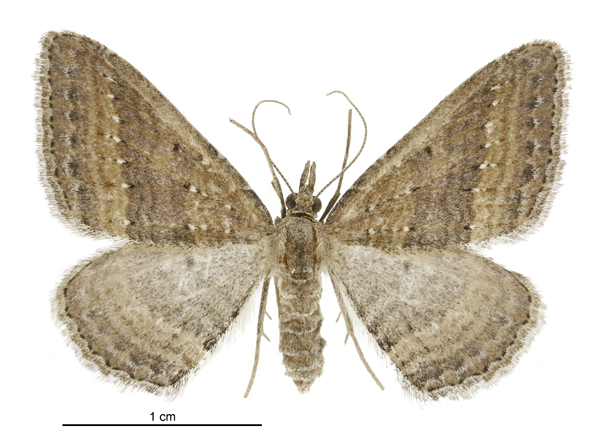
- Female
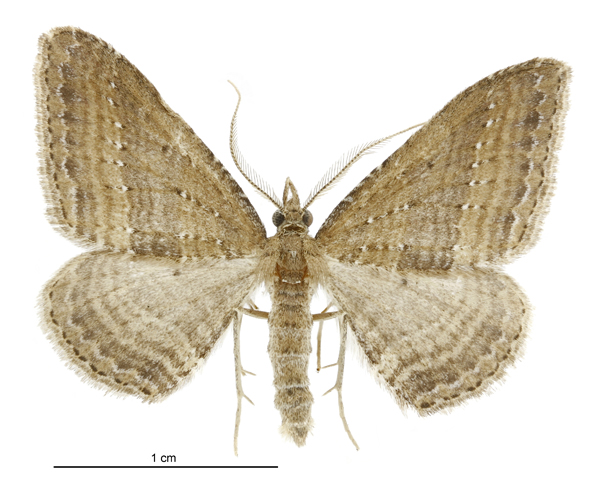
- Male

Scientific classification
- Kingdom: Animalia
- Phylum: Arthropoda
- Class: Insecta
- Order: Lepidoptera
- Family: Geometridae
- Genus: Epyaxa
- Species: E. venipunctata

Binomial name
- Epyaxa venipunctata (Walker, 1863)

Synonyms
- Panagra venipunctata Walker, 1863; Xanthorhoe venipunctata (Walker, 1863)

= Epyaxa venipunctata =

Species of moth endemic to New Zealand

Epyaxa venipunctata is a species of moth in the family Geometridae. It is endemic to New Zealand. This species was first described by Francis Walker in 1863.
