= Kauaiina montgomeryi =

Scientific classification
- Domain: Eukaryota
- Kingdom: Animalia
- Phylum: Arthropoda
- Class: Insecta
- Order: Lepidoptera
- Family: Geometridae
- Genus: Kauaiina
- Species: K. montgomeryi

Binomial name
- Kauaiina montgomeryi Riotte, 1978

Species of moth

Kauaiina montgomeryi is a moth of the family Geometridae first described by Jules C. E. Riotte in 1978. It is endemic to the eastern part of the Hawaiian island of Maui.
