= Kauaiina rubropulverula =

Scientific classification
- Domain: Eukaryota
- Kingdom: Animalia
- Phylum: Arthropoda
- Class: Insecta
- Order: Lepidoptera
- Family: Geometridae
- Genus: Kauaiina
- Species: K. rubropulverula

Binomial name
- Kauaiina rubropulverula Riotte, 1989

Species of moth

Kauaiina rubropulverula is a moth of the family Geometridae first described by Jules C. E. Riotte in 1989. It is endemic to Hawaii.
