= Kauaiina alakaii =

Scientific classification
- Domain: Eukaryota
- Kingdom: Animalia
- Phylum: Arthropoda
- Class: Insecta
- Order: Lepidoptera
- Family: Geometridae
- Genus: Kauaiina
- Species: K. alakaii

Binomial name
- Kauaiina alakaii Riotte, 1979

Species of moth

Kauaiina alakaii is a moth of the family Geometridae first described by Jules C. E. Riotte in 1979. It is endemic to the eastern part of the Hawaiian island of Kauai, where it was collected in the Alakai Swamp, after which it is named.
