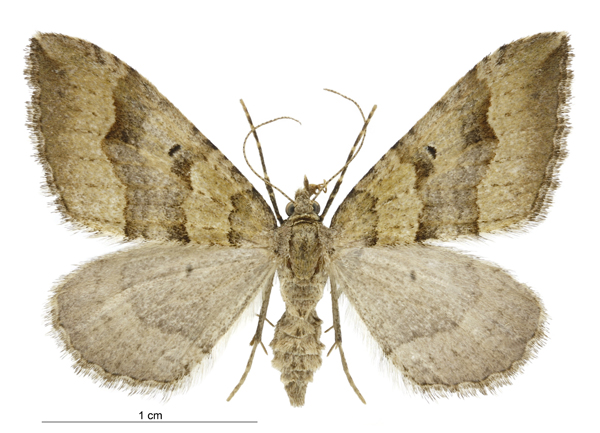
- Female
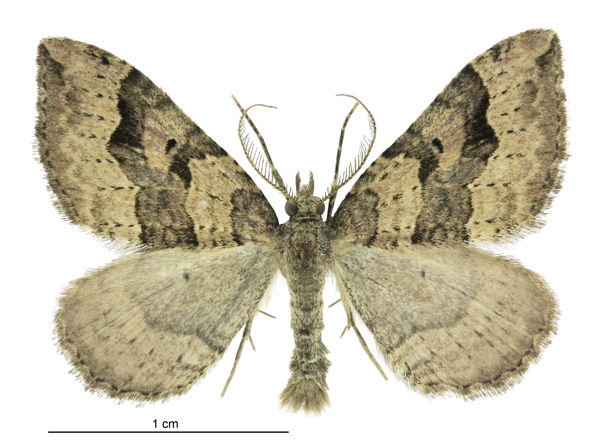
- Male

Scientific classification
- Kingdom: Animalia
- Phylum: Arthropoda
- Clade: Pancrustacea
- Class: Insecta
- Order: Lepidoptera
- Family: Geometridae
- Genus: Epyaxa
- Species: E. rosearia

Binomial name
- Epyaxa rosearia (Doubleday, 1843)

Synonyms
- Cidaria rosearia Doubleday, 1843; Larentia subductata Walker, 1862; Coremia ardularia Guenèe, 1868; Coremia inamaenaria Guenèe, 1868; Xanthorhoe homalocyma Meyrick, 1902; Xanthorhoe subductata (Walker, 1862); Xanthorhoe rosearia (Doubleday, 1843)

= Epyaxa rosearia =

New Zealand looper

Species of moth

Epyaxa rosearia, the New Zealand looper or plantain moth, is a moth of the family Geometridae. It is endemic to New Zealand.

== Taxonomy ==
E. rosearia was first described by Edward Doubleday in 1843 and named Cidaria rosearia.

== Description ==
The eggs of this species are pale yellow and oval with a smooth shell.

Alex Purdie describes the caterpillar of this species as:

Length, at rest, about three- quarters of an inch. Colour light-green, with indistinct whitish longitudinal lines, and a narrow median dorsal stripe of the ground colour, edged on each side by one of these whitish lines; a subdorsal whitish line on each side of the median stripe; the ground colour shows again as a lateral line, edged below with whitish. Under-side with delicate whitish or yellowish longitudinal tracings, as on the upper side. The junctions of the segments show yellowish or whitish rings when the larva contracts. Head, greenish-yellow. Body tapering somewhat to the head.

The caterpillars form a chrysalis that is glossy and very dark brownish black. They can be found amongst the leaves of the forest floor. E. rosearia adults are varied in appearance. They can have a pinkish tinge or can be brownish in hue although olive green is also common.

== Distribution ==
E. rosearia are very common throughout New Zealand.

== Host species ==
While it is endemic to New Zealand, the larvae have so far only been recorded feeding on exotic plant species: Nasturtium officinale, Plantago lanceolata, Trifolium ambiguum, Trifolium repens and Tropaeolum majus. The larvae also seem to feed on the leaves of Trifolium caucasicum.

== Behaviour ==
Adults are attracted to light and have been collected via a mercury vapour light trap.

== Interaction with humans ==
A recent study suggests this moth may be assisting with the pollination of avocado trees.
