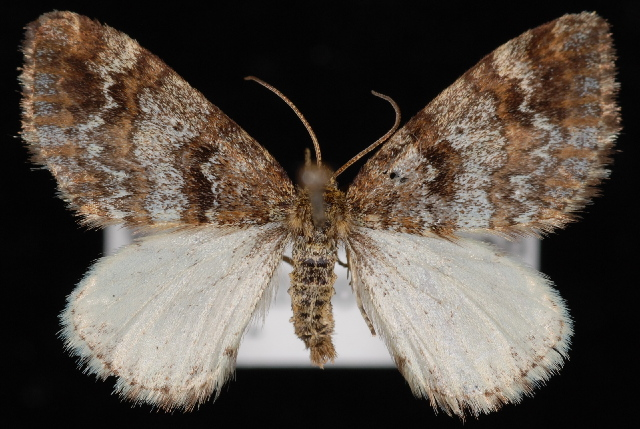

Scientific classification
- Kingdom: Animalia
- Phylum: Arthropoda
- Clade: Pancrustacea
- Class: Insecta
- Order: Lepidoptera
- Family: Geometridae
- Tribe: Xanthorhoini
- Genus: Enchoria
- Species: E. lacteata

Binomial name
- Enchoria lacteata (Packard, 1876)

= Enchoria lacteata =

Species of moth

Enchoria lacteata is a species of geometrid moth in the family Geometridae.
