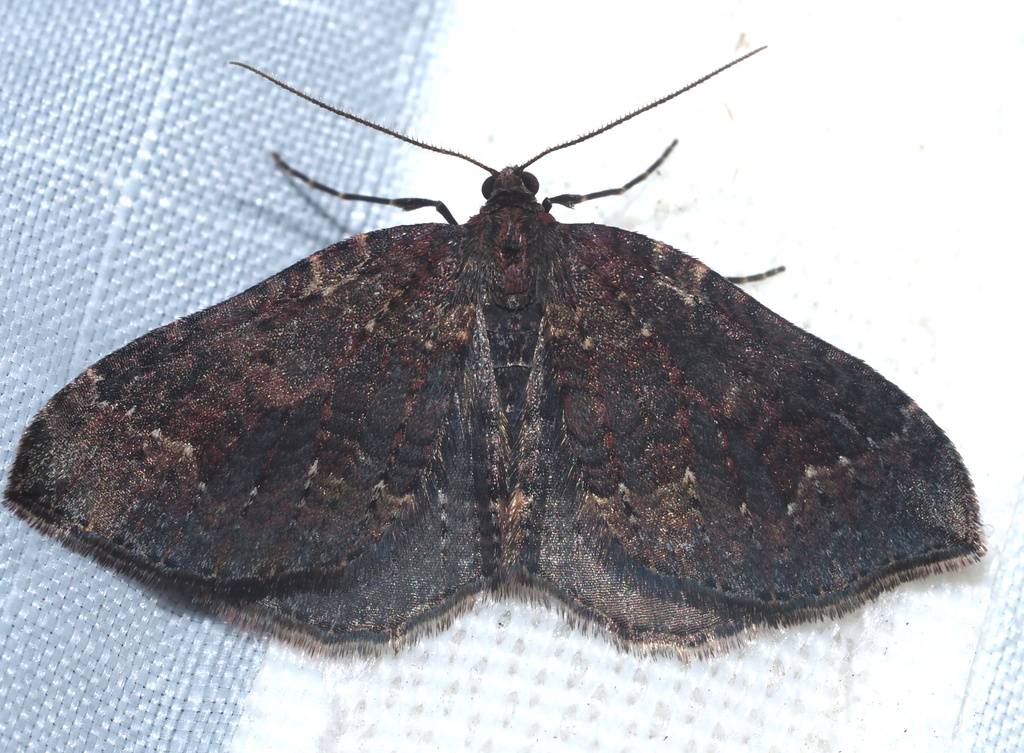

Scientific classification
- Kingdom: Animalia
- Phylum: Arthropoda
- Clade: Pancrustacea
- Class: Insecta
- Order: Lepidoptera
- Family: Geometridae
- Genus: Kauaiina
- Species: K. parva

Binomial name
- Kauaiina parva Riotte, 1980

= Kauaiina parva =

Species of moth

Kauaiina parva is a moth of the family Geometridae first described by Jules C. E. Riotte in 1980. It is endemic to the eastern part of the Hawaiian island of Maui.
