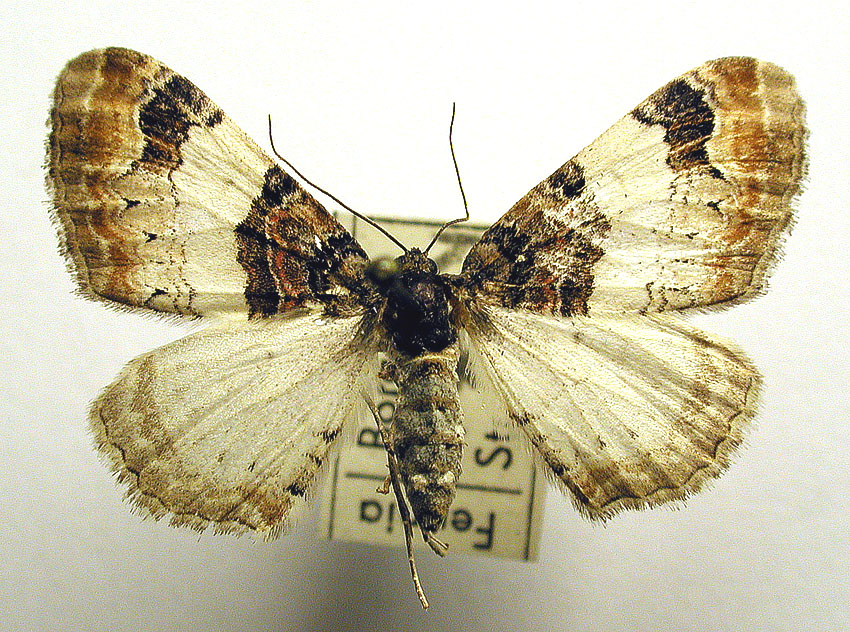
- Catarhoe cuculata

Scientific classification
- Kingdom: Animalia
- Phylum: Arthropoda
- Clade: Pancrustacea
- Class: Insecta
- Order: Lepidoptera
- Family: Geometridae
- Tribe: Xanthorhoini
- Genus: Catarhoe; Herbulot, 1951

= Catarhoe =

Genus of moths

Catarhoe is a genus of moths in the family Geometridae erected by Claude Herbulot in 1951.

== Species ==
- Catarhoe arachne Wiltshire, 1967
- Catarhoe basochesiata (Duponchel, 1831)
- Catarhoe cuculata (Hufnagel, 1767) – royal mantle
- Catarhoe cupreata (Herrich-Schäffer, 1838)
- Catarhoe nyctichroa (Hampson, 1912)
- Catarhoe permixtaria (Herrich-Schäffer, 1851)
- Catarhoe putridaria (Herrich-Schäffer, 1852)
- Catarhoe rubidata (Denis & Schiffermüller, 1775) – ruddy carpet
- Catarhoe yokohamae (Butler, 1881)
