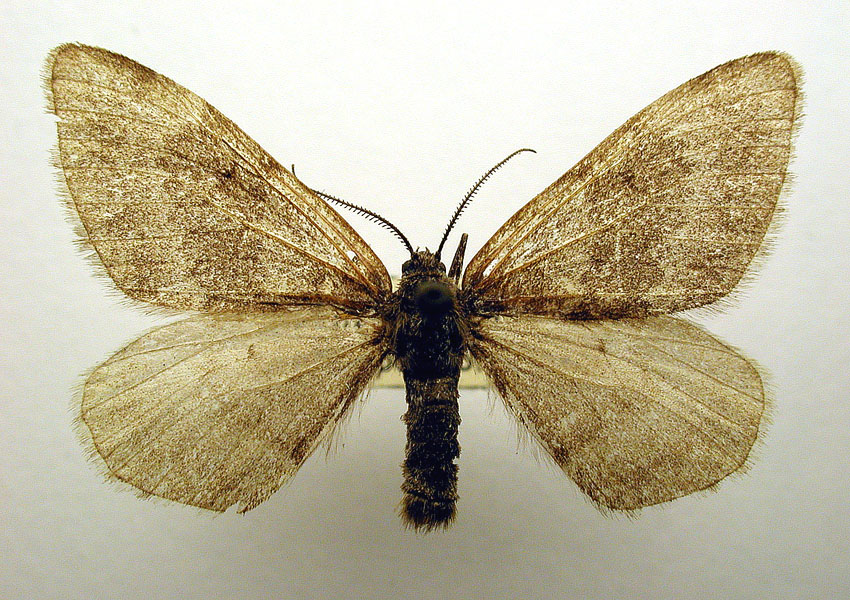

Scientific classification
- Kingdom: Animalia
- Phylum: Arthropoda
- Class: Insecta
- Order: Lepidoptera
- Family: Geometridae
- Genus: Psychophora
- Species: P. sabini

Binomial name
- Psychophora sabini (Kirby, 1824)

Synonyms
- Bombyx sabini Kirby, 1824; Larentia frigidaria Guenee, 1858

= Psychophora sabini =

Species of moth

Psychophora sabini is a moth of the family Geometridae first described by William Kirby in 1824. It is found in northern Europe, Asia and northern North America, including Greenland. The habitat consists of rocky heath, mostly above 1,000 meters above sea level.

The wingspan is 22–29 mm. Adults are on wing in July. They feed on the nectar of various flowers, but mainly Silene acaulis.

The larvae feed on Vaccinium myrtillus. Larvae can be found from August to June. It overwinters as a larva.

== Subspecies ==
- Psychophora sabini sabini (North America)
- Psychophora sabini frigidaria (Guenee, 1858)
- Psychophora sabini polaris Hulst, 1903
