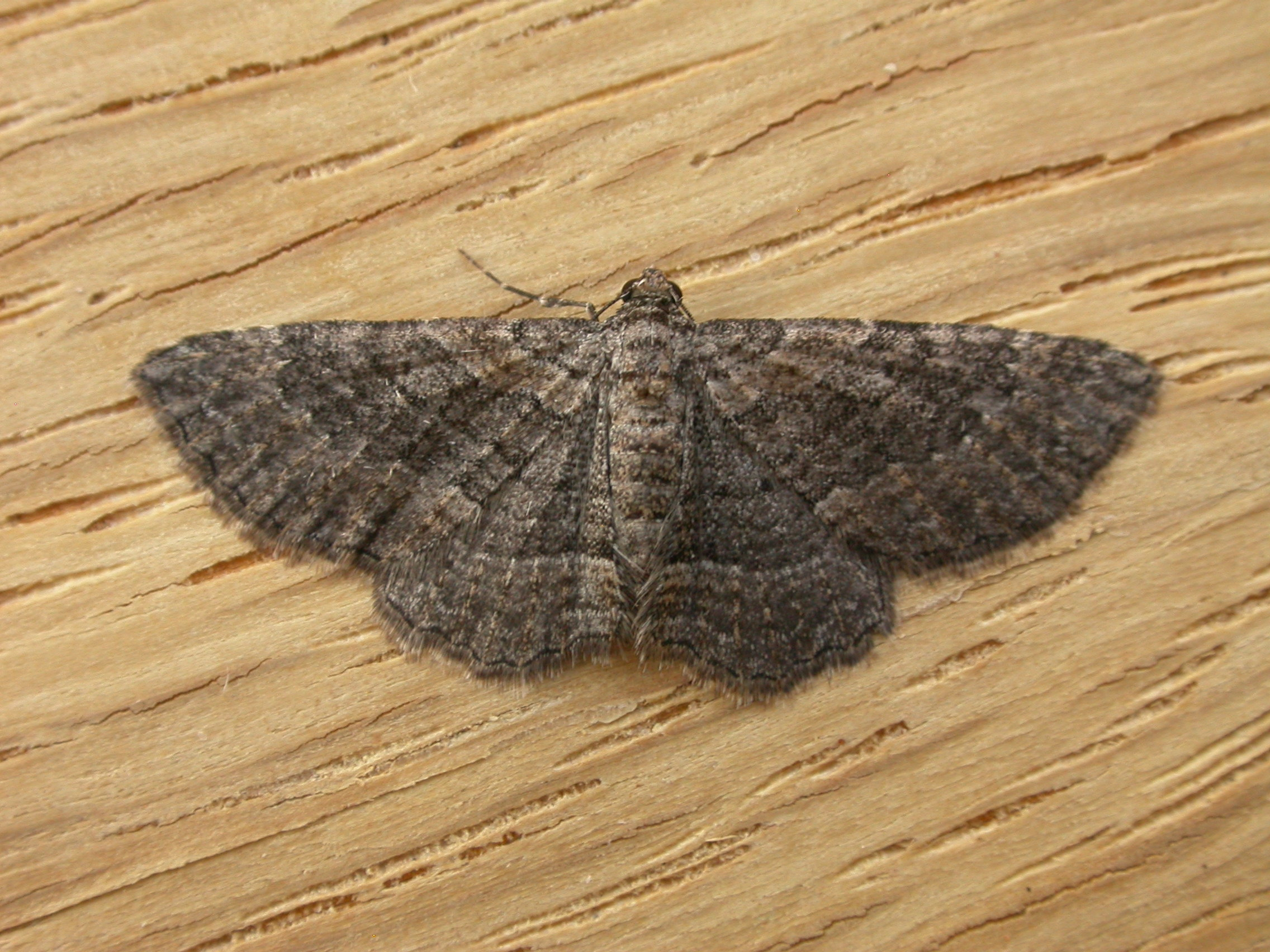

Scientific classification
- Domain: Eukaryota
- Kingdom: Animalia
- Phylum: Arthropoda
- Class: Insecta
- Order: Lepidoptera
- Family: Geometridae
- Genus: Chrysolarentia
- Species: C. squamulata

Binomial name
- Chrysolarentia squamulata (Warren, 1899)

Synonyms
- Camptogramma squamulata Warren, 1899

= Chrysolarentia squamulata =

Species of moth

Chrysolarentia squamulata, the scaled carpet, is a species of moth of the family Geometridae first described by William Warren in 1899. It is found in Australia.
