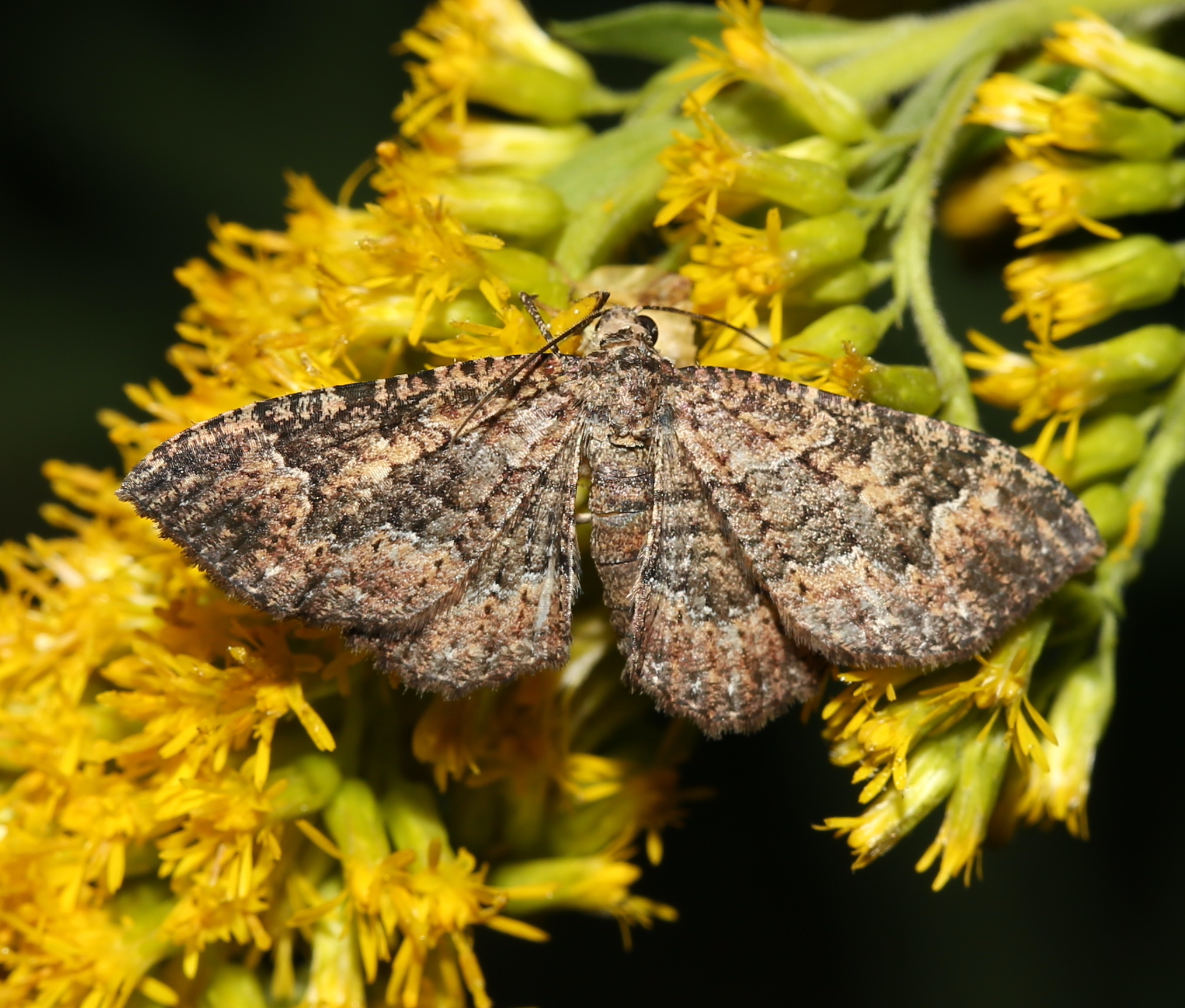

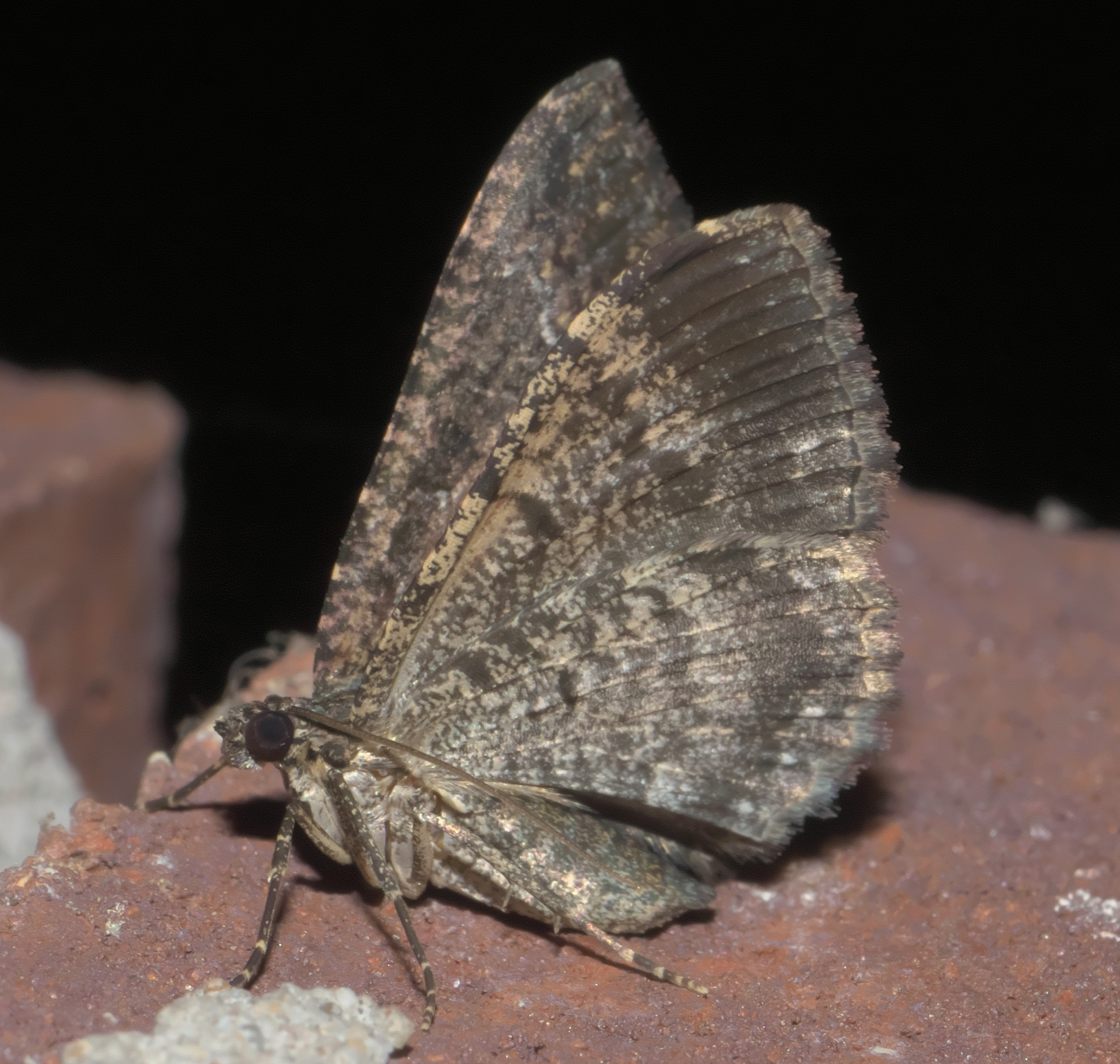

Scientific classification
- Kingdom: Animalia
- Phylum: Arthropoda
- Class: Insecta
- Order: Lepidoptera
- Family: Geometridae
- Genus: Disclisioprocta
- Species: D. stellata

Binomial name
- Disclisioprocta stellata (Guenée, [1858])

Synonyms
- Disclisioprocta fuscovariata (Wallengren, 1860); Disclisioprocta impauperata (Walker, 1862); Disclisioprocta balteolata (Herrich-Schäffer, 1865); Disclisioprocta albosignata (Packard, 1873); Disclisioprocta foedata (Warren, 1900)

= Disclisioprocta stellata =

Species of moth

Disclisioprocta stellata, the somber carpet or bougainvillea looper, is a moth of the family Geometridae. It is found in sub-Saharan Africa, the islands of the Indian Ocean, and from eastern Canada (Ontario, Quebec and New Brunswick) south through the United States, Mexico, the Antilles, Bahamas and Bermuda Islands to Bolivia and Brazil. It was introduced to Hawaii in 1993.

The wingspan is 25–33 mm. In North America, adults are on wing all year round in the south and from July to November in the north.

Larvae have been recorded on Amaranthus, Proboscidea, Bougainvillea and Boerhaavia erecta, Pisonia aculeata and Mirabilis jalapa.

== Subspecies ==
- Disclisioprocta stellata stellata (from Canada, the United States and Mexico to Bolivia and Brazil)
- Disclisioprocta stellata natalata Walker (Africa south of Sahara, Madagascar and islands of the Indian Ocean)
