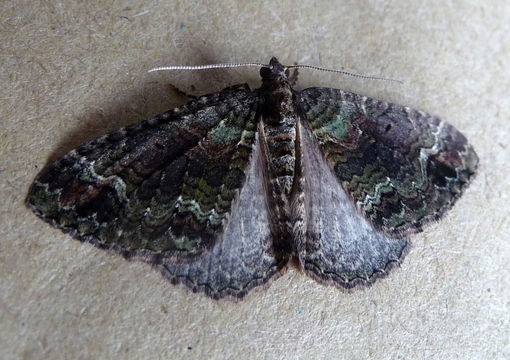
- An unconfirmed Catarhoe basochesiata

Scientific classification
- Domain: Eukaryota
- Kingdom: Animalia
- Phylum: Arthropoda
- Class: Insecta
- Order: Lepidoptera
- Family: Geometridae
- Genus: Catarhoe
- Species: C. basochesiata

Binomial name
- Catarhoe basochesiata (Duponchel,1831)

= Catarhoe basochesiata =

Species of moth

Catarhoe basochesiata is a moth of the family Geometridae. It is found in Europe. It was first described by Philogène Duponchel in 1831 as Cidaria basochesiata. Catarhoe basochesiata has a wingspan of 23–27 mm (0.91–1.06 in). The forewings vary in colour from reddish brown to greyish brown, with some moths having very dark brown forewings that poorly contrast with the patterns on them. The moth can be found across the western Mediterranean, from the Iberian Peninsula across France and into Italy and from Morocco to Tunisia. The moth prefers hot, dry conditions in low coastal regions, from 0–500 m (0–1,640 ft) above sea level and occasionally higher.
