= Dysrhoe =

Scientific classification
- Kingdom: Animalia
- Phylum: Arthropoda
- Class: Insecta
- Order: Lepidoptera
- Family: Geometridae
- Tribe: Xanthorhoini
- Genus: Dysrhoe; Herbulot, 1951

Genus of moths

Dysrhoe is a genus of moths in the family Geometridae first described by Claude Herbulot in 1951.

== Species ==
- Dysrhoe olbia Prout, 1911
- Dysrhoe rhiogyra Prout, 1932
