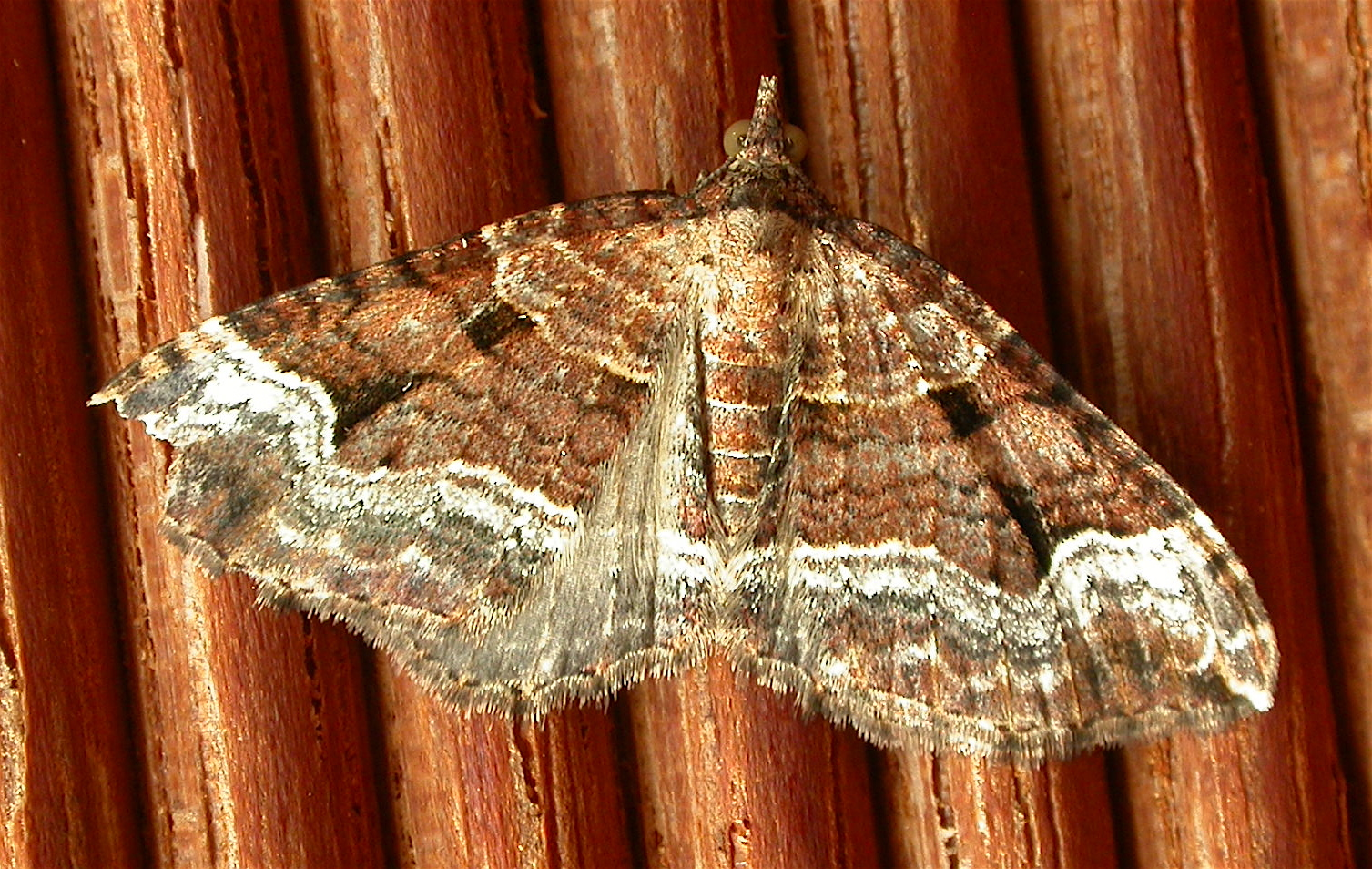

Scientific classification
- Kingdom: Animalia
- Phylum: Arthropoda
- Class: Insecta
- Order: Lepidoptera
- Family: Geometridae
- Genus: Epyaxa
- Species: E. subidaria

Binomial name
- Epyaxa subidaria Guenée, 1857

= Epyaxa subidaria =

Subidaria moth

Species of moth

Epyaxa subidaria, the subidaria moth, is a moth of the family Geometridae. The species was first described by Achille Guenée in 1857 and it is native to Australia, including Tasmania.
