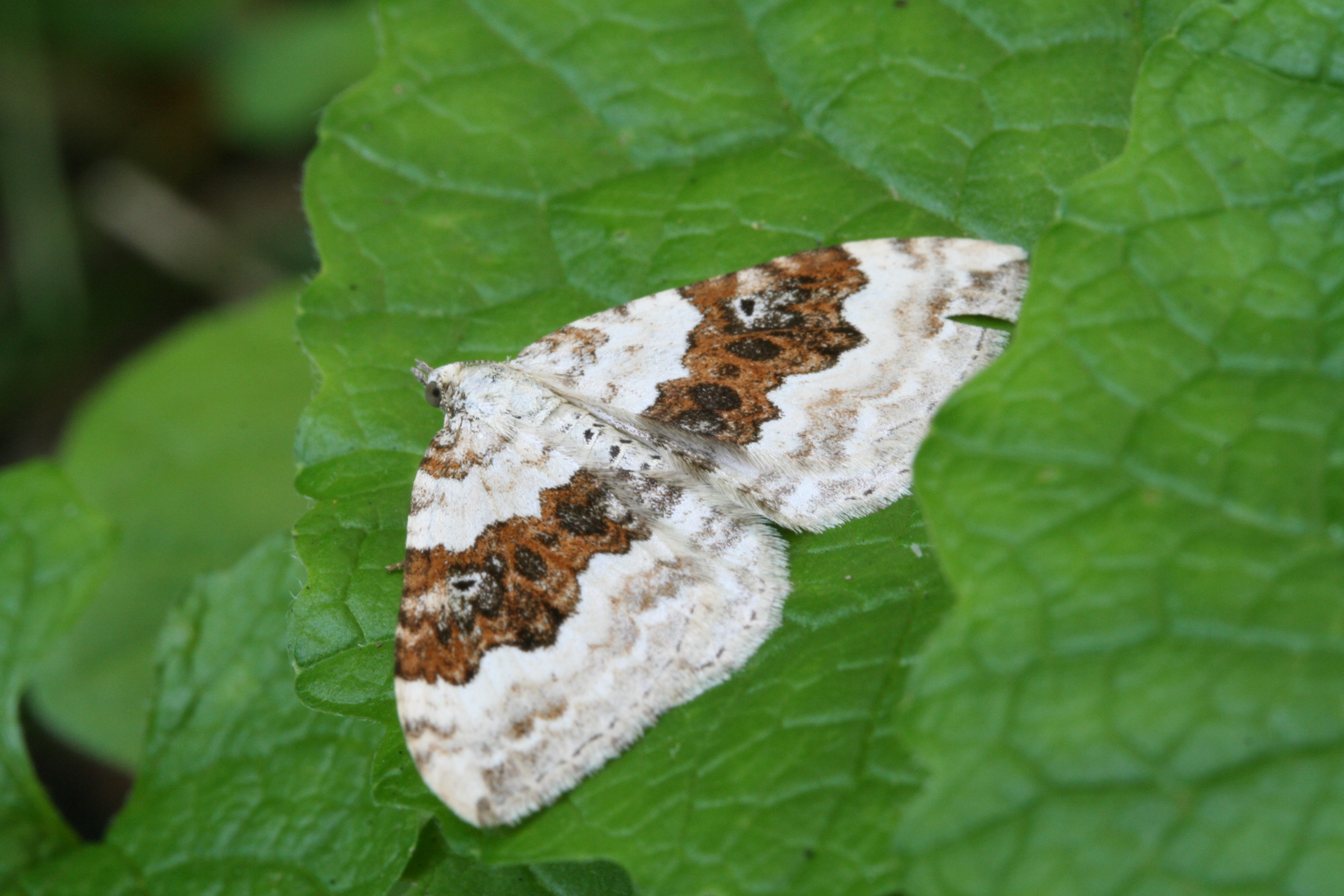
- Silver-ground carpet (Xanthorhoe montanata)

Scientific classification
- Domain: Eukaryota
- Kingdom: Animalia
- Phylum: Arthropoda
- Class: Insecta
- Order: Lepidoptera
- Family: Geometridae
- Subfamily: Larentiinae
- Tribe: Xanthorhoini; Pierce, 1914

= Xanthorhoini =

Tribe of moths

Xanthorhoini is a tribe of geometer moths under subfamily Larentiinae. The tribe was described by Pierce in 1914.

== Recognized genera ==
- Acodia Rosenstock, 1885
- Austrocidaria Dugdale, 1971
- Camptogramma Stephens, 1831
- Catarhoe Herbulot, 1951
- Chrysolarentia Butler, 1882
- Costaconvexa Agenjo, 1949
- Dasyuris Guenée, 1868
- Disclisioprocta Wallengren, 1861
- Dysrhoe Herbulot, 1951
- Enchoria Hulst, 1896
- Epirrhoe Hübner, 1825
- Epyaxa Meyrick, 1883
- Euphyia Hübner, 1825
- Glaucorhoe Herbulot, 1951
- Haplolabida D. S. Fletcher, 1958
- Herreshoffia Sperry, 1949
- Juxtephria Viidalepp, 1976
- Kauaiina Riotte, 1978
- Loxofidonia Packard, 1876
- Orthonama Hübner, 1825
- Parortholitha Herbulot, 1955
- Protorhoe Herbulot, 1951
- Psychophora Kirby, 1824
- Scotocyma Turner, 1904
- Scotopteryx Hübner, 1825
- Visiana Swinhoe, 1900
- Xanthorhoe Hübner, [1825]
- Zenophleps Hulst, 1896
