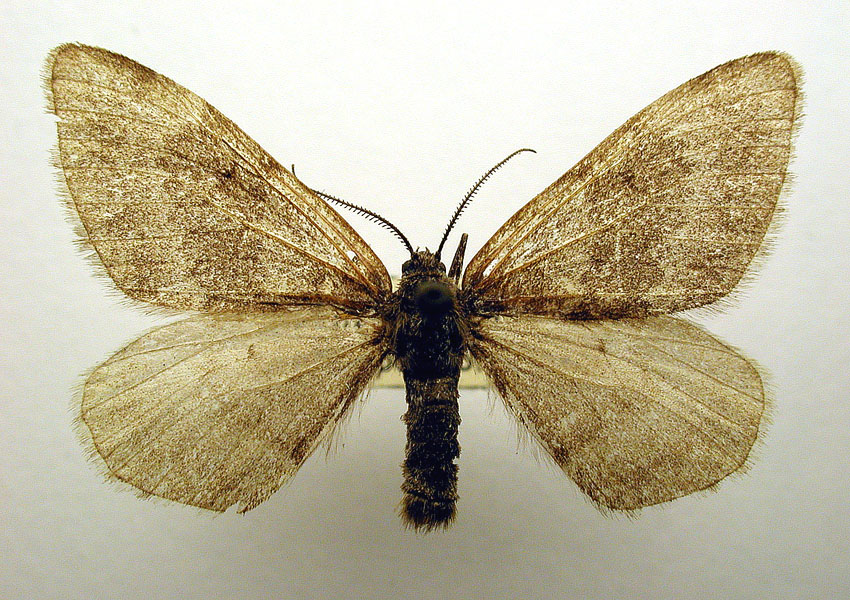
- Psychophora sabini

Scientific classification
- Kingdom: Animalia
- Phylum: Arthropoda
- Class: Insecta
- Order: Lepidoptera
- Family: Geometridae
- Tribe: Xanthorhoini
- Genus: Psychophora; Kirby, 1824

Synonyms
- Scinneria Dyar, 1903

= Psychophora =

Genus of moths

Psychophora is a genus of moths in the family Geometridae first described by William Kirby in 1824.

== Species ==
- Psychophora immaculata (Skinner & Mengel, 1892)
- Psychophora phocata (Möschler, 1862)
- Psychophora sabini Kirby, 1824
- Psychophora suttoni Heinrich, 1942
