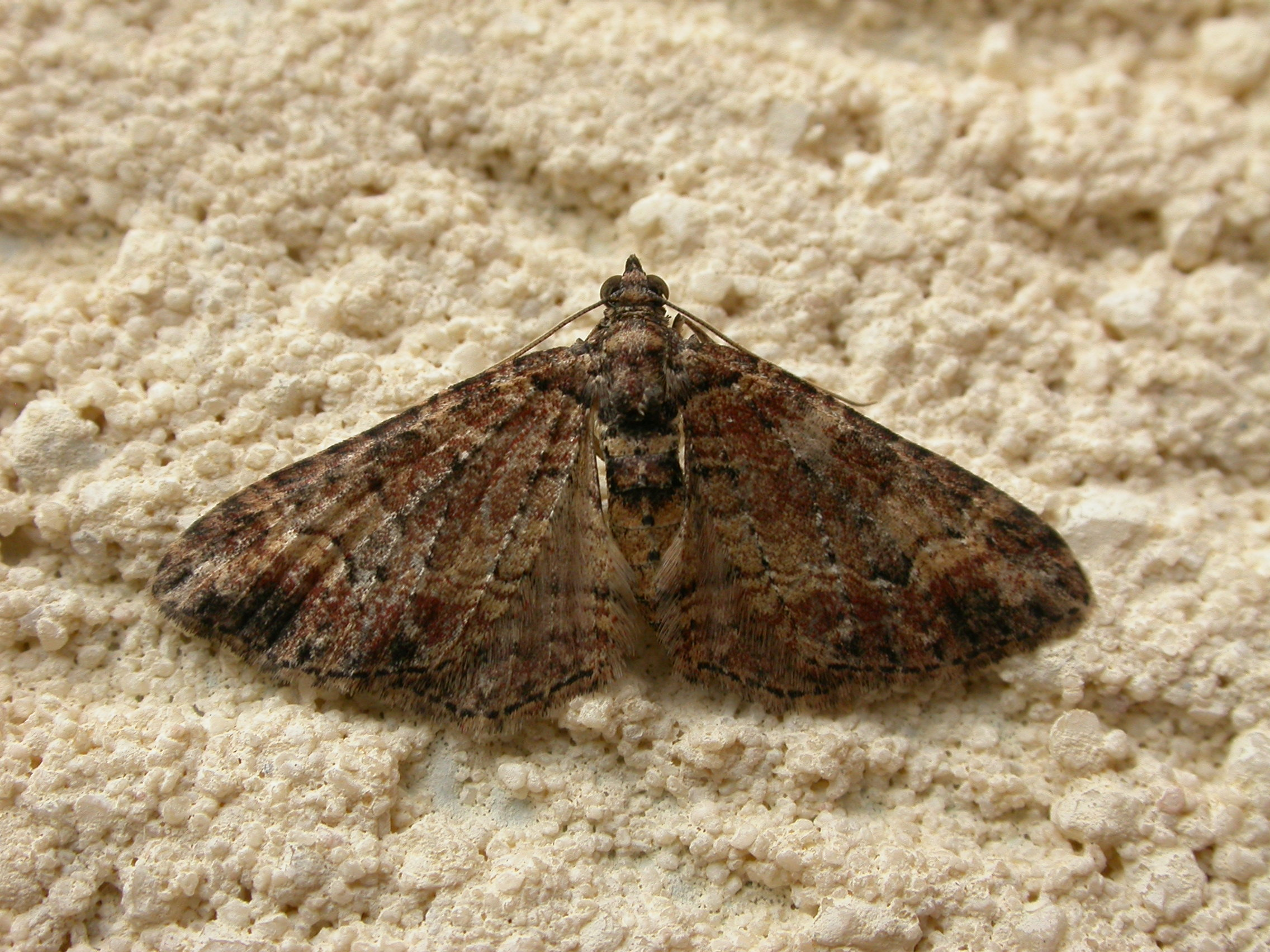

Scientific classification
- Domain: Eukaryota
- Kingdom: Animalia
- Phylum: Arthropoda
- Class: Insecta
- Order: Lepidoptera
- Family: Geometridae
- Genus: Chrysolarentia
- Species: C. plesia

Binomial name
- Chrysolarentia plesia (Turner, 1904)

Synonyms
- Hydriomena plesia Turner, 1904

= Chrysolarentia plesia =

Species of moth

Chrysolarentia plesia, the plesia carpet, is a moth of the family Geometridae first described by Alfred Jefferis Turner in 1904. It is found in the Australian states of Victoria and Western Australia.

The wingspan is about 20 mm.
