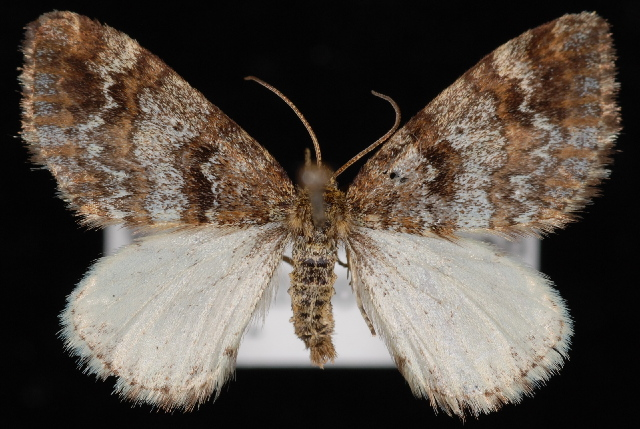
- Enchoria lacteata

Scientific classification
- Kingdom: Animalia
- Phylum: Arthropoda
- Class: Insecta
- Order: Lepidoptera
- Family: Geometridae
- Tribe: Xanthorhoini
- Genus: Enchoria; Hulst, 1896

= Enchoria =

Genus of moths

Enchoria is a genus of moths in the family Geometridae.

== Species ==
- Enchoria herbicolata (Hulst, 1896)
- Enchoria lacteata (Packard, 1876)
- Enchoria osculata Hulst, 1896
