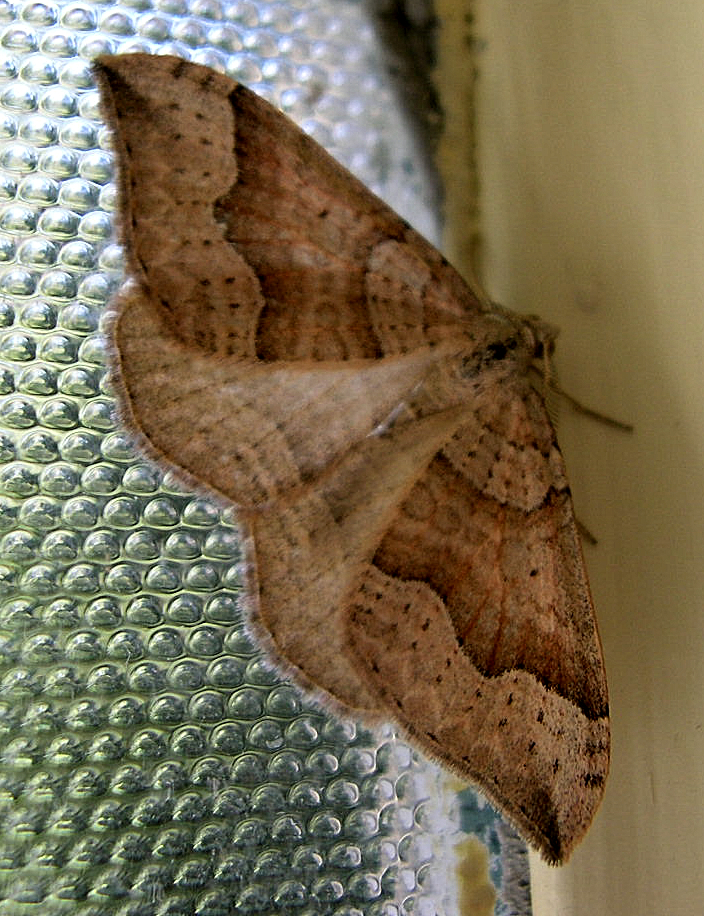
- Zenophleps alpinata moth

Scientific classification
- Domain: Eukaryota
- Kingdom: Animalia
- Phylum: Arthropoda
- Class: Insecta
- Order: Lepidoptera
- Family: Geometridae
- Tribe: Xanthorhoini
- Genus: Zenophleps; Hulst, 1896

= Zenophleps =

Genus of moths

Zenophleps is a genus of moths in the family Geometridae first described by George Duryea Hulst in 1896.

== Species ==
- Zenophleps alpinata Cassino, 1927
- Zenophleps lignicolorata (Packard, 1874)
- Zenophleps obscurata Hulst, 1896
- Zenophleps pallescens McDunnough, 1938
