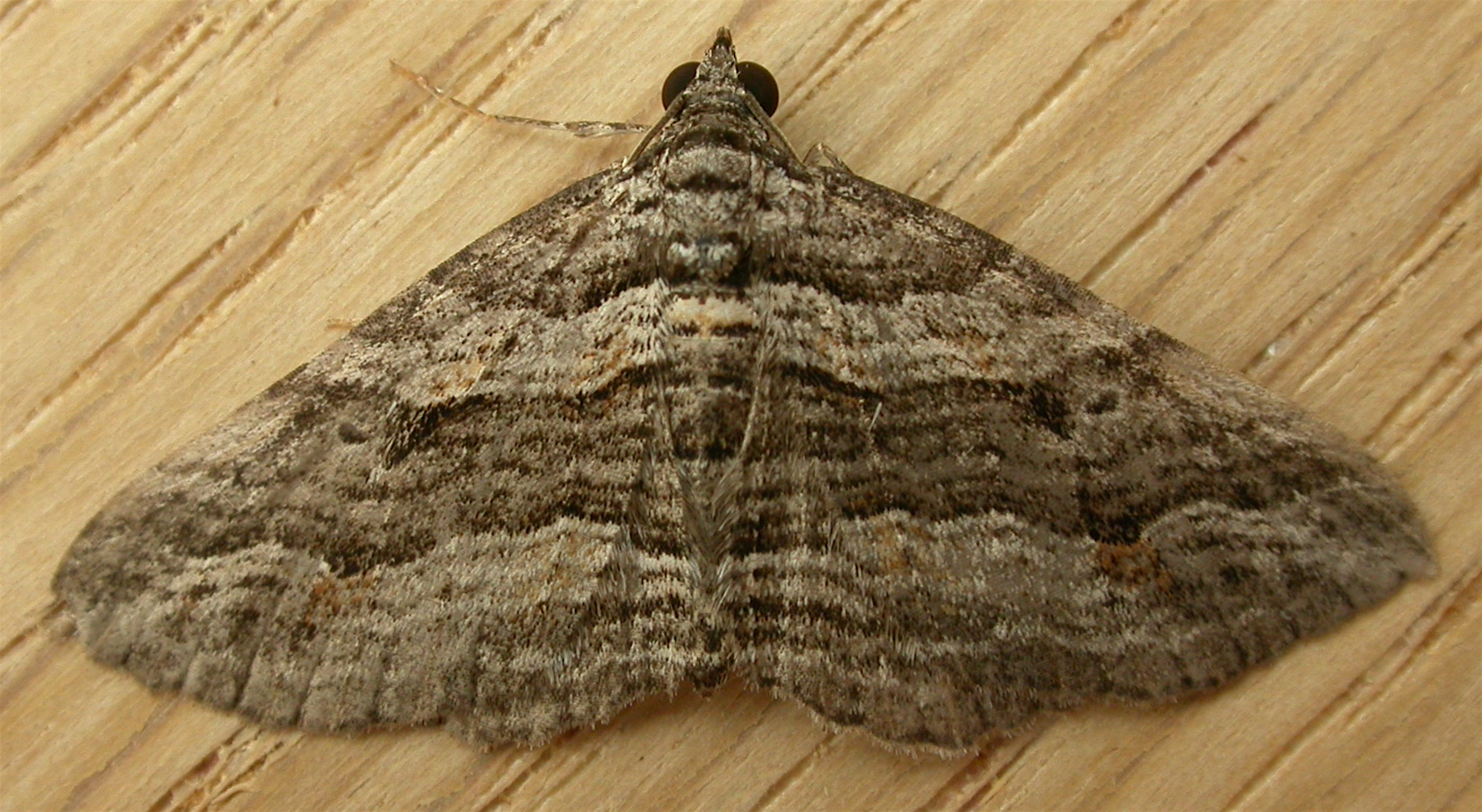

Scientific classification
- Kingdom: Animalia
- Phylum: Arthropoda
- Clade: Pancrustacea
- Class: Insecta
- Order: Lepidoptera
- Family: Geometridae
- Genus: Chrysolarentia
- Species: C. severata

Binomial name
- Chrysolarentia severata Guenée (1857)

Synonyms
- Camptogramma severata Guenée, [1858]; Cidaria promptata Walker, 1862; Phibalapteryx perfectata Walker, 1862; Scotosia scitiferata Walker, 1862

= Chrysolarentia severata =

Species of moth

Chrysolarentia severata, also known as finely-lined carpet, is a species of geometrid moth in the subfamily Larentiinae. It occurs in Australia.

The wingspan is about 3 cm (1.2 in). The larvae feed on Astroloma humifusum (Ericaceae).
