= Kauaiina ioxantha =

Scientific classification
- Kingdom: Animalia
- Phylum: Arthropoda
- Class: Insecta
- Order: Lepidoptera
- Family: Geometridae
- Genus: Kauaiina
- Species: K. ioxantha

Binomial name
- Kauaiina ioxantha (Meyrick, 1899)

Synonyms
- Xanthorhoe ioxantha Meyrick, 1899; Fletcherana ioxantha

Species of moth

Kauaiina ioxantha is a moth of the family Geometridae. It was first described by Edward Meyrick in 1899. It is endemic to the Hawaiian island of Kauai.
