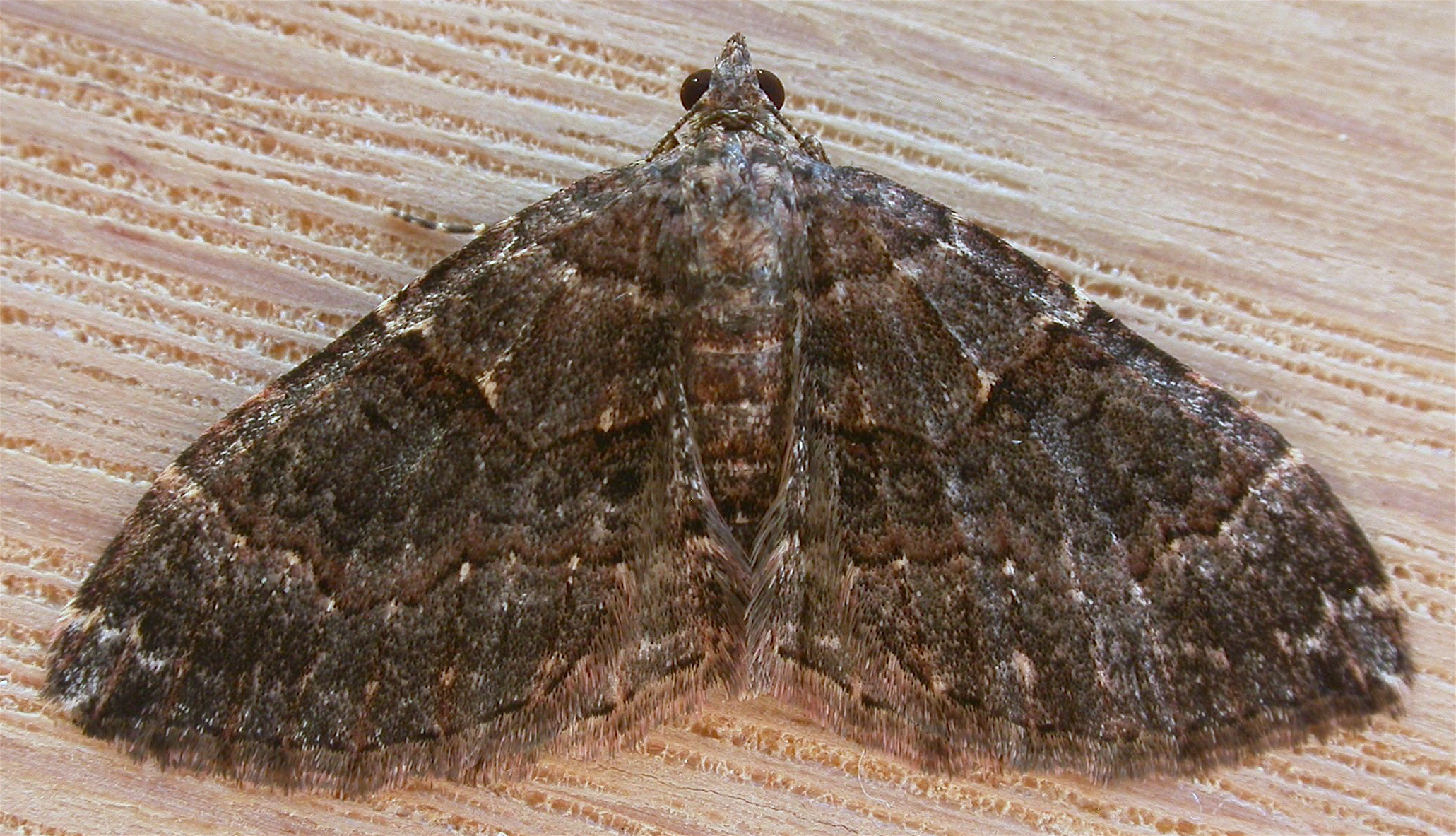

Scientific classification
- Kingdom: Animalia
- Phylum: Arthropoda
- Class: Insecta
- Order: Lepidoptera
- Family: Geometridae
- Genus: Epyaxa
- Species: E. sodaliata

Binomial name
- Epyaxa sodaliata Walker, 1862

Synonyms
- Xantharhoe divisata

= Epyaxa sodaliata =

Species of moth

Epyaxa sodaliata, the sodaliata moth, is a moth of the family Geometridae. The species was first described by Francis Walker in 1862 and it is native to Australia.

The wingspan is about 30 mm.

The larvae feed on Anagallis arvensis.
