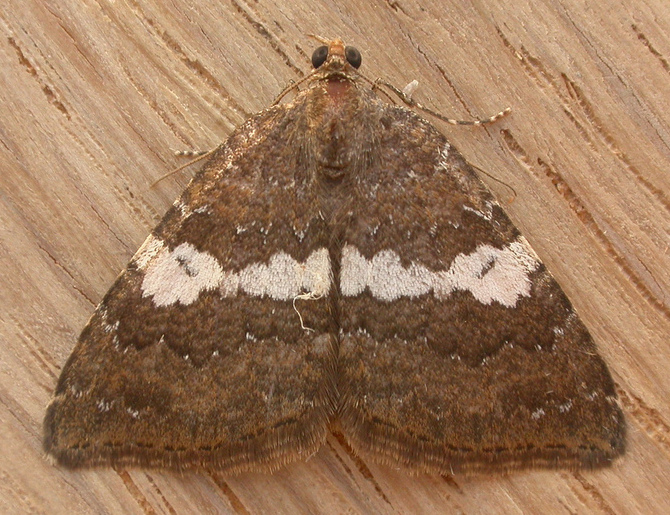

Scientific classification
- Domain: Eukaryota
- Kingdom: Animalia
- Phylum: Arthropoda
- Class: Insecta
- Order: Lepidoptera
- Family: Geometridae
- Genus: Chrysolarentia
- Species: C. heteroleuca

Binomial name
- Chrysolarentia heteroleuca Meyrick, 1891

= Chrysolarentia heteroleuca =

Species of moth

Chrysolarentia heteroleuca is a species of moth of the family Geometridae. It is found in Australia, including Tasmania. It was first found in Mount Kosciusko, NSW and Warragul, Victoria. It was defined in 1891 by Edward Meyrick, originally as Hydriomena heteroleuca.
