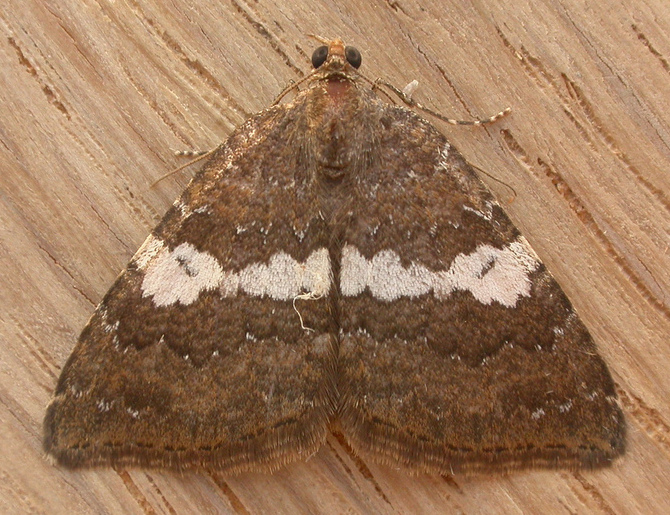
- Chrysolarentia heteroleuca

Scientific classification
- Kingdom: Animalia
- Phylum: Arthropoda
- Class: Insecta
- Order: Lepidoptera
- Family: Geometridae
- Subfamily: Larentiinae
- Tribe: Xanthorhoini
- Genus: Chrysolarentia; Butler, 1882

= Chrysolarentia =

Genus of moths

Chrysolarentia is a genus of moths in the family Geometridae erected by Arthur Gardiner Butler in 1882. It is mainly found in Australia with one species (Chrysolarentia subrectaria) found also in New Zealand.

== Selected species ==
- Chrysolarentia actinipha (Lower, 1902)
- Chrysolarentia adornata (Guenée, 1857)
- Chrysolarentia aglaodes (Meyrick, 1891)
- Chrysolarentia aprepta (Turner, 1922)
- Chrysolarentia arachnitis (Turner, 1904)
- Chrysolarentia argocyma (Turner, 1904)
- Chrysolarentia bertha (Swinhoe, 1902)
- Chrysolarentia bichromata (Guenée, 1857)
- Chrysolarentia caesia (Turner, 1904)
- Chrysolarentia callima (Turner, 1904)
- Chrysolarentia cataphaea (Meyrick, 1891)
- Chrysolarentia chrysocyma (Meyrick, 1891)
- Chrysolarentia cnephaeopa Turner, 1926
- Chrysolarentia conifasciata Butler, 1882
- Chrysolarentia coniophylla (Turner, 1922)
- Chrysolarentia crocota (Turner, 1904)
- Chrysolarentia cryeropa (Meyrick, 1891)
- Chrysolarentia decisaria (Walker, 1863)
- Chrysolarentia doliopis (Meyrick, 1891)
- Chrysolarentia epicteta (Turner, 1908)
- Chrysolarentia euclidiata (Guenée, 1857)
- Chrysolarentia euphileta (Turner, 1907)
- Chrysolarentia eustropha (Turner, 1926)
- Chrysolarentia gypsomela (Lower, 1892)
- Chrysolarentia hedylepta (Turner, 1904)
- Chrysolarentia heliacaria (Guenée, 1857)
- Chrysolarentia heteroleuca (Meyrick, 1891)
- Chrysolarentia heterotropa (Turner, 1926)
- Chrysolarentia hilaodes (Turner, 1926)
- Chrysolarentia imperviata (Walker, 1862)
- Chrysolarentia inangulata (Bastelberger, 1908)
- Chrysolarentia insulsata (Guenée, 1857)
- Chrysolarentia interruptata (Guenée, 1857)
- Chrysolarentia leptophrica (Turner, 1922)
- Chrysolarentia leucophanes (Meyrick, 1891)
- Chrysolarentia leucozona (Meyrick, 1891)
- Chrysolarentia loxocyma (Turner, 1904)
- Chrysolarentia lucidulata (Walker, 1862)
- Chrysolarentia mecynata (Guenée, 1857)
- Chrysolarentia melanchlaena (Turner, 1922)
- Chrysolarentia microcyma (Guest, 1887)
- Chrysolarentia nephodes (Meyrick, 1891)
- Chrysolarentia opipara (Turner, 1907)
- Chrysolarentia orthropis (Meyrick, 1891)
- Chrysolarentia oxygona (Meyrick, 1891)
- Chrysolarentia oxyodonta (Turner, 1922)
- Chrysolarentia panochra (Turner, 1922)
- Chrysolarentia pantoea (Turner, 1908)
- Chrysolarentia perialla (Turner, 1922)
- Chrysolarentia pericalles (Turner, 1922)
- Chrysolarentia perornata (Walker, 1862)
- Chrysolarentia persimilis (Turner, 1926)
- Chrysolarentia phaedra (Meyrick, 1891)
- Chrysolarentia phaeoxutha (Turner, 1926)
- Chrysolarentia phaulophanes (Turner, 1936)
- Chrysolarentia photographica (Turner, 1939)
- Chrysolarentia plagiocausta (Turner, 1904)
- Chrysolarentia plesia (Turner, 1904)
- Chrysolarentia poliophasma (Turner, 1922)
- Chrysolarentia polycarpa (Meyrick, 1891)
- Chrysolarentia polyxantha (Meyrick, 1891)
- Chrysolarentia psarodes (Turner, 1904)
- Chrysolarentia ptochopis (Turner, 1907)
- Chrysolarentia rhynchota (Meyrick, 1891)
- Chrysolarentia severata (Guenée, 1857)
- Chrysolarentia squamulata (Warren, 1899)
- Chrysolarentia stereozona (Meyrick, 1891)
- Chrysolarentia subrectaria (Guenée, 1857)
- Chrysolarentia symphona (Meyrick, 1891)
- Chrysolarentia synchora (Meyrick, 1891)
- Chrysolarentia tacera (Turner, 1922)
- Chrysolarentia tasmanica (Turner, 1926)
- Chrysolarentia tristis (Butler, 1882)
- Chrysolarentia trygodes (Meyrick, 1891)
- Chrysolarentia vicissata (Guenée, 1857)
