= Protorhoe =

Scientific classification
- Kingdom: Animalia
- Phylum: Arthropoda
- Class: Insecta
- Order: Lepidoptera
- Family: Geometridae
- Tribe: Xanthorhoini
- Genus: Protorhoe; Herbulot, 1951

Genus of moths

Protorhoe is a genus of moths in the family Geometridae.

== Species ==
- Protorhoe corollaria (Herrich-Schäffer, 1848)
- Protorhoe unicata (Guenée, 1858)
