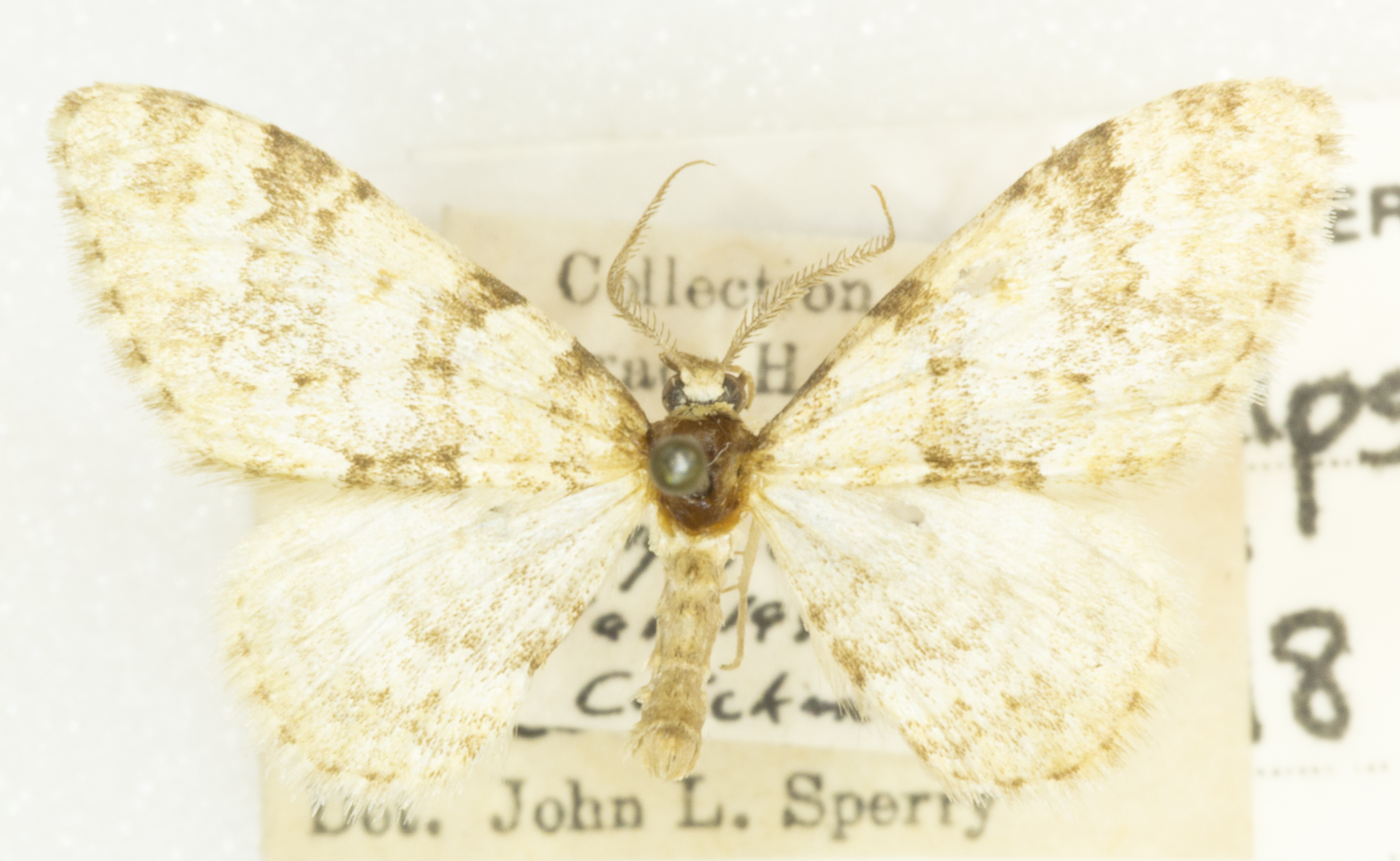

Scientific classification
- Kingdom: Animalia
- Phylum: Arthropoda
- Class: Insecta
- Order: Lepidoptera
- Family: Geometridae
- Genus: Zenophleps
- Species: Z. obscurata

Binomial name
- Zenophleps obscurata Hulst, 1896

= Zenophleps obscurata =

Species of moth

Zenophleps obscurata is a species of geometrid moth in the family Geometridae. It is endemic to North America.

The MONA or Hodges number for Zenophleps obscurata is 7409.
