= Loxofidonia =

Scientific classification
- Kingdom: Animalia
- Phylum: Arthropoda
- Clade: Pancrustacea
- Class: Insecta
- Order: Lepidoptera
- Family: Geometridae
- Tribe: Xanthorhoini
- Genus: Loxofidonia; Packard, 1876

Genus of moths

Loxofidonia is a genus of moths in the family Geometridae described by Alpheus Spring Packard in 1876.

- Loxofidonia acidaliata (Packard, 1874)
- Loxofidonia cingala Moore, 1887
