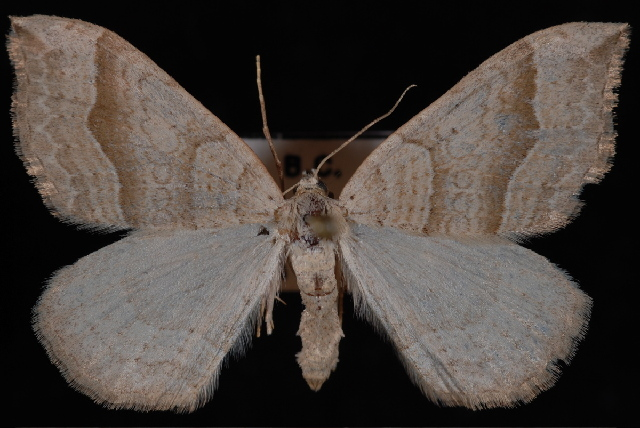

Scientific classification
- Kingdom: Animalia
- Phylum: Arthropoda
- Clade: Pancrustacea
- Class: Insecta
- Order: Lepidoptera
- Family: Geometridae
- Genus: Zenophleps
- Species: Z. lignicolorata

Binomial name
- Zenophleps lignicolorata (Packard, 1874)

= Zenophleps lignicolorata =

Species of moth

Zenophleps lignicolorata is a species of geometrid moth in the family Geometridae. It is found in North America.

The MONA or Hodges number for Zenophleps lignicolorata is 7406.
