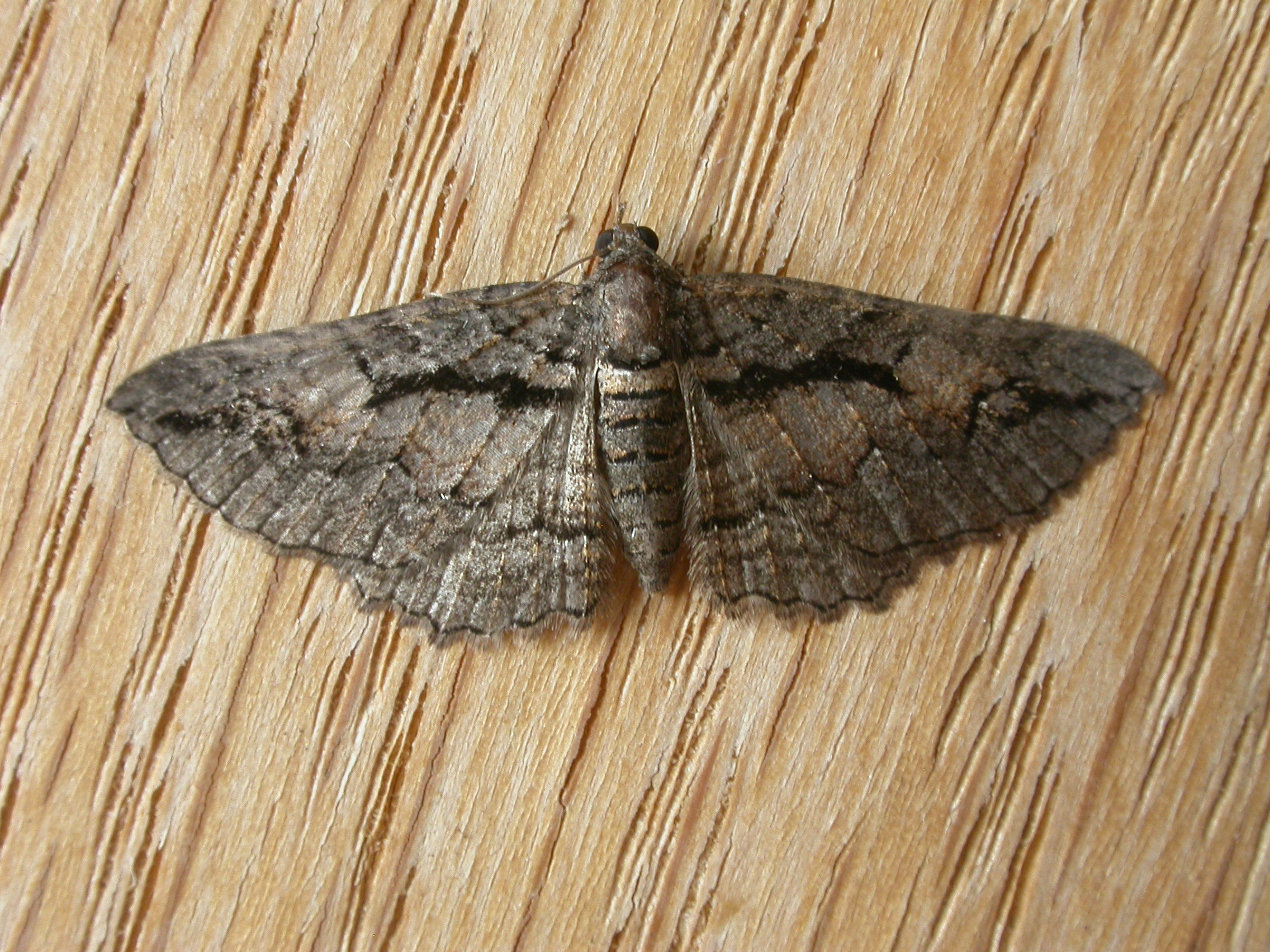

Scientific classification
- Domain: Eukaryota
- Kingdom: Animalia
- Phylum: Arthropoda
- Class: Insecta
- Order: Lepidoptera
- Family: Geometridae
- Genus: Chrysolarentia
- Species: C. plagiocausta

Binomial name
- Chrysolarentia plagiocausta (Turner, 1904)

Synonyms
- Hydriomena plagiocausta Turner, 1904

= Chrysolarentia plagiocausta =

Species of moth

Chrysolarentia plagiocausta, the black-lined carpet, is a moth of the family Geometridae first described by Alfred Jefferis Turner in 1904. It is found in the Australian Capital Territory, Tasmania and Victoria.

The wingspan is about 30 mm.
