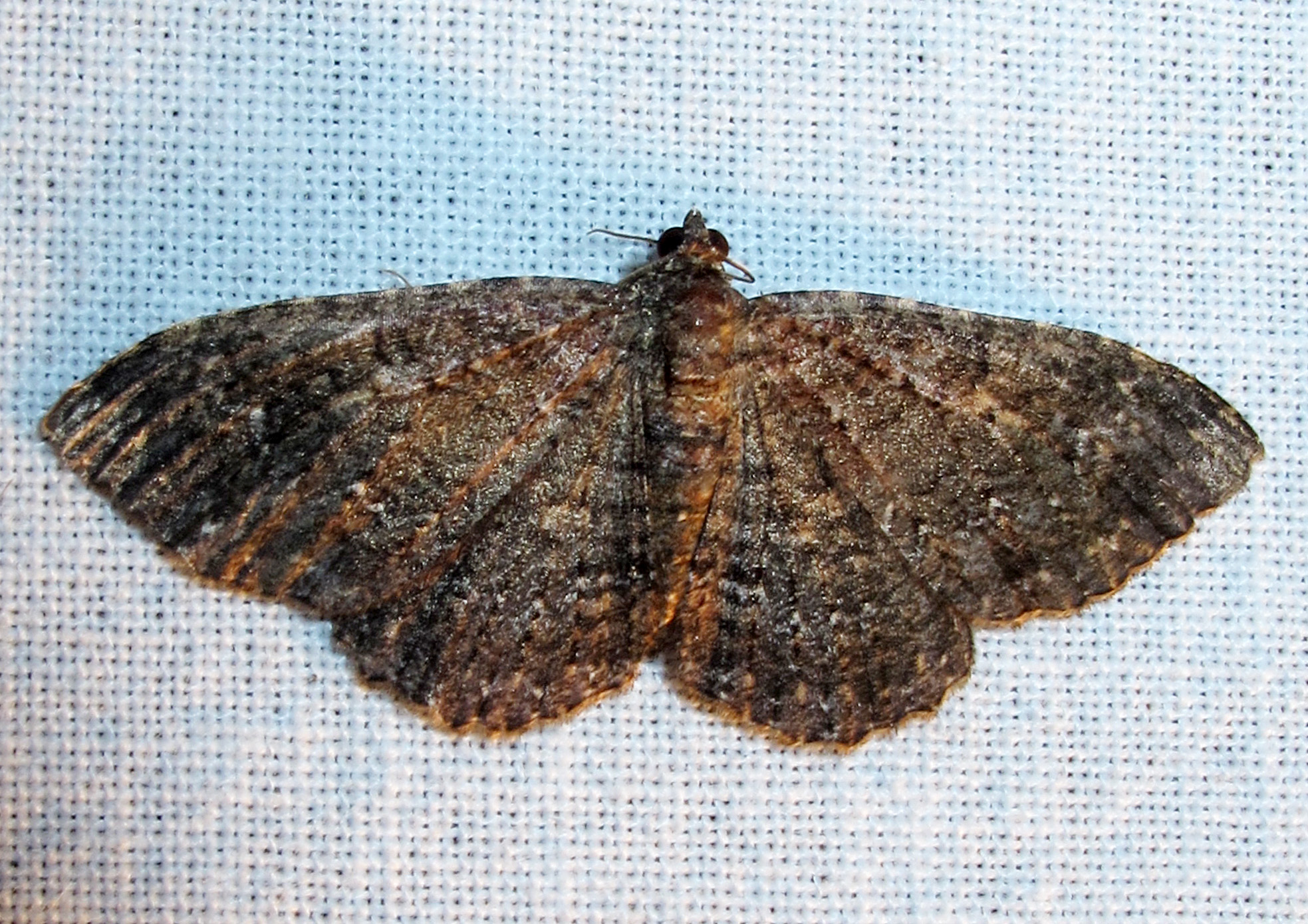

Scientific classification
- Kingdom: Animalia
- Phylum: Arthropoda
- Clade: Pancrustacea
- Class: Insecta
- Order: Lepidoptera
- Family: Geometridae
- Tribe: Xanthorhoini
- Genus: Disclisioprocta; Wallengren, 1861

Synonyms
- Camptolina Schaus, 1940

= Disclisioprocta =

Genus of moths

Disclisioprocta is a genus of moths in the family Geometridae.

== Species ==
- Disclisioprocta natalata (Walker, 1862)
- Disclisioprocta stellata (Guenée, 1857)
