= Juxtephria =

Scientific classification
- Kingdom: Animalia
- Phylum: Arthropoda
- Class: Insecta
- Order: Lepidoptera
- Family: Geometridae
- Tribe: Xanthorhoini
- Genus: Juxtephria

Genus of moths

Juxtephria is a genus of moths in the family Geometridae.
