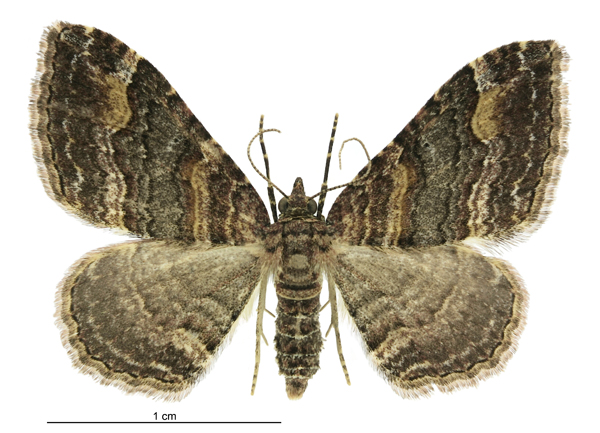
- Female
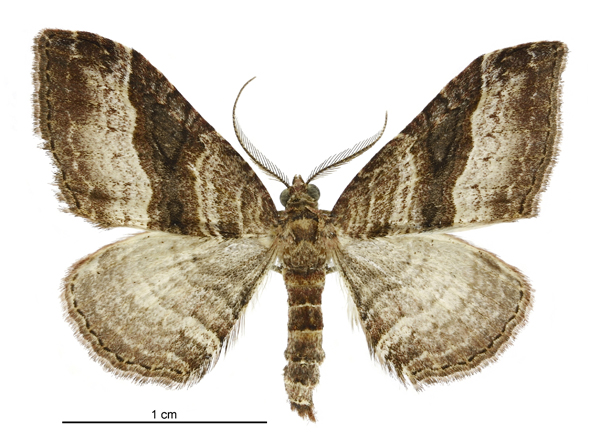
- Male

Scientific classification
- Kingdom: Animalia
- Phylum: Arthropoda
- Clade: Pancrustacea
- Class: Insecta
- Order: Lepidoptera
- Family: Geometridae
- Genus: Epyaxa
- Species: E. lucidata

Binomial name
- Epyaxa lucidata (Walker, 1862)

Synonyms
- Larentia lucidata Walker, 1862; Coremia robustaria (Walker, 1862); Coremia plurimata (Walker, 1862); Hydriomena officiosa Meyrick, 1910; Xanthorhoe pratiea Meyrick, 1911; Xanthorhoe practica Meyrick, 1911

= Epyaxa lucidata =

Species of moth endemic to New Zealand

Epyaxa lucidata is a species of moth in the family Geometridae. It is endemic to New Zealand.

== Taxonomy ==
This species was first described by Francis Walker in 1862 using material collected by Andrew Sinclair and named Larentia lucidata. In 1911 Edward Meyrick, thinking he was describing a new species, gave it the name Xanthorhoe practica. This name, along with Xanthorhoe robustaria, was synonymised with Xanthorhoe lucidata by L. B. Prout in 1939. Since then, the name has changed to Epyaxa Lucidata. The holotype specimen is held at the Natural History Museum, London.

== Description ==
Epyaxa lucidata is a small moth with a body length of about 1 cm and a wingspan of around 20-30mm. They have a pattern similar to the bark of a tree and come in shades of gray and brown. Epyaxa lucidata belongs to the Geometridae family, which generally contains moths having slender bodies and broad wings held flat while the moth is at rest. The genus Epyaxa to which E. lucidata belongs is closely related to Helastia, another genus within Geometridae . Epyaxa moths can be distinguished from Helastia by the male antennal pectinations, which have their bases hidden by the preceding segment apex. Epyaxa are also sexually dimorphic in wing coloration and pattern. Identification of Epyaxa lucidata is likely most accurate by examining the male genitalia. Looking at the right valva, internal face, when compared to other members of the same genus, Epyaxa lucidata exhibits a similar shape and size to E. sodaliata. These species both have quite narrow and short genitalia with hairs on the top side. Epyaxa lucidata can be distinguished from E. sodaliata by the right valva’s more robust shape; the underside is more curved and convex compared to the rigid geometric style of E. sodaliata.

== Distribution ==
This species is endemic to and only found in New Zealand. Epyaxa lucidata has around 1500 observations on Inaturalist.nz, which include observations in nearly all major regions of New Zealand with the exception of Stewart Island. Epyaxa lucidata has been recorded in literature in Te Tumu Kaituna, near Rotorua.

== Habitat preferences ==
Epyaxa lucidata can usually be found in native shrubland or forest margins. For example, in a survey of Te Tumu Kaituna, E. lucidata was found in an area with many shrubs and forest margins near the ocean. The moth found in this survey was found on herbage, specifically in its larval stage. This is consistent with other members of the Epyaxa genus, which tend to feed on herbaceous plants.

== Life cycle ==
Like other members of Lepidoptera, Epyaxa lucidata starts off as an egg, before becoming a larvae, pupa, and adult. Lepidoptera species lay their eggs on or near host plants, which then serve as food for their larvae. The larvae pupate after they have reached enough size, or when certain factors influence them to pupate. The adults then emerge from the pupal form in a final molt, this time with wings and able to reproduce. While there is not any information specifically regarding Epyaxa lucidata, it probably follows a similar pattern to other geometrid moths and has a seasonal life cycle mostly taking place in warmer months.

== Diet ==
Epyaxa lucidata does not have any well documented feeding practices, but it has been documented as a larva on herbage, which would suggest that it eats similar things to other geometrid moths or even Epyaxa moths.

== Predators ==
Epyaxa lucidata is likely preyed upon by birds, bats, and invertebrates like spiders. There is no literature presently regarding parasitic wasps having a relationship with E. lucidata.
