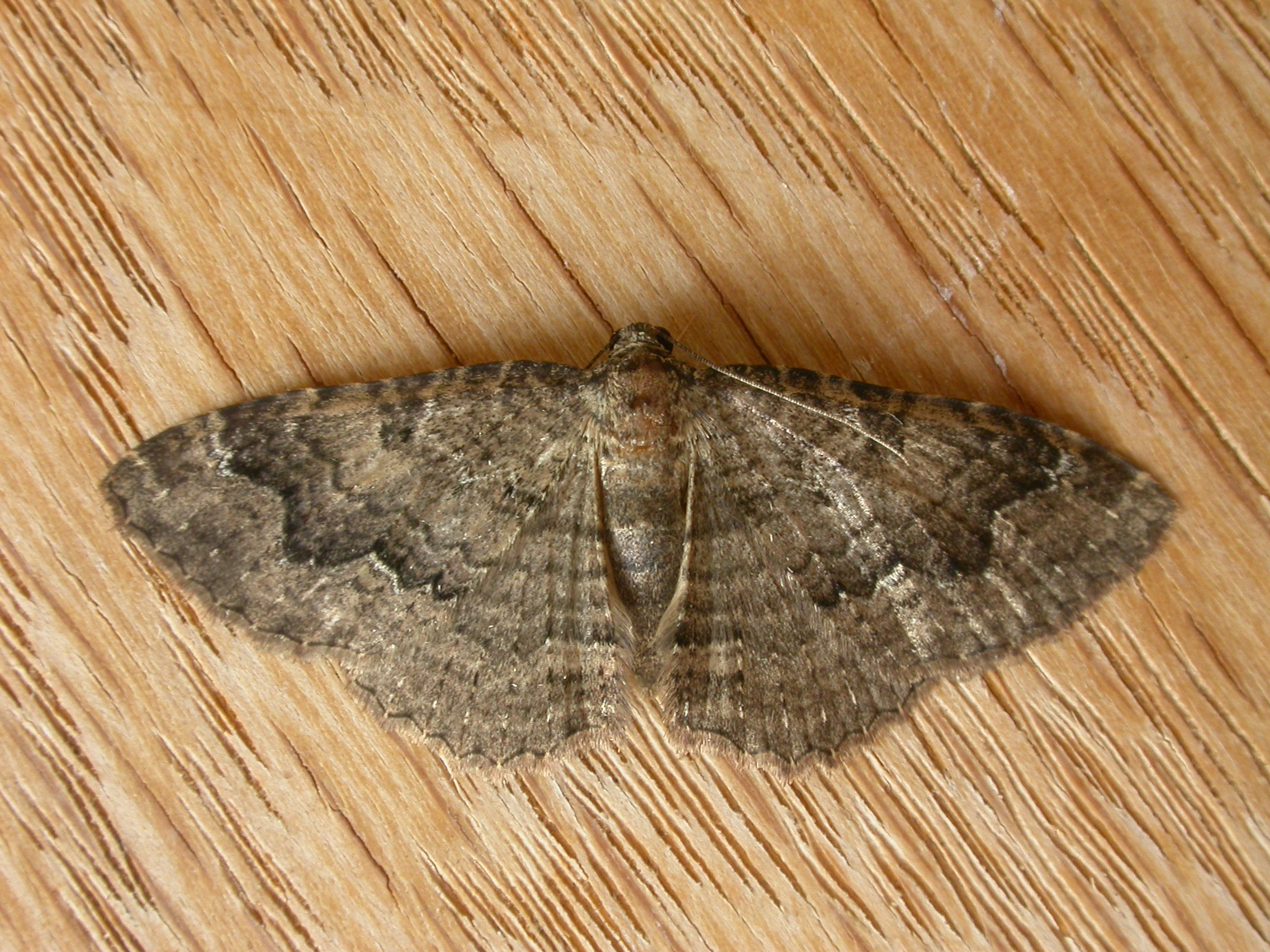

Scientific classification
- Kingdom: Animalia
- Phylum: Arthropoda
- Class: Insecta
- Order: Lepidoptera
- Family: Geometridae
- Genus: Visiana
- Species: V. brujata

Binomial name
- Visiana brujata (Guenée, 1857)

Synonyms
- Scotosia brujata Guenée, 1857; Scotosia repentinata Walker, 1862; Scotosia incertata Walker, 1862; Tephrosia breviaria Walker, 1866

= Visiana brujata =

Species of moth

Visiana brujata, the brujata carpet, is a species of moth in the family Geometridae first described by Achille Guenée in 1857. It is found in the Australian Capital Territory, New South Wales and Tasmania.

The wingspan is about 30 mm.
