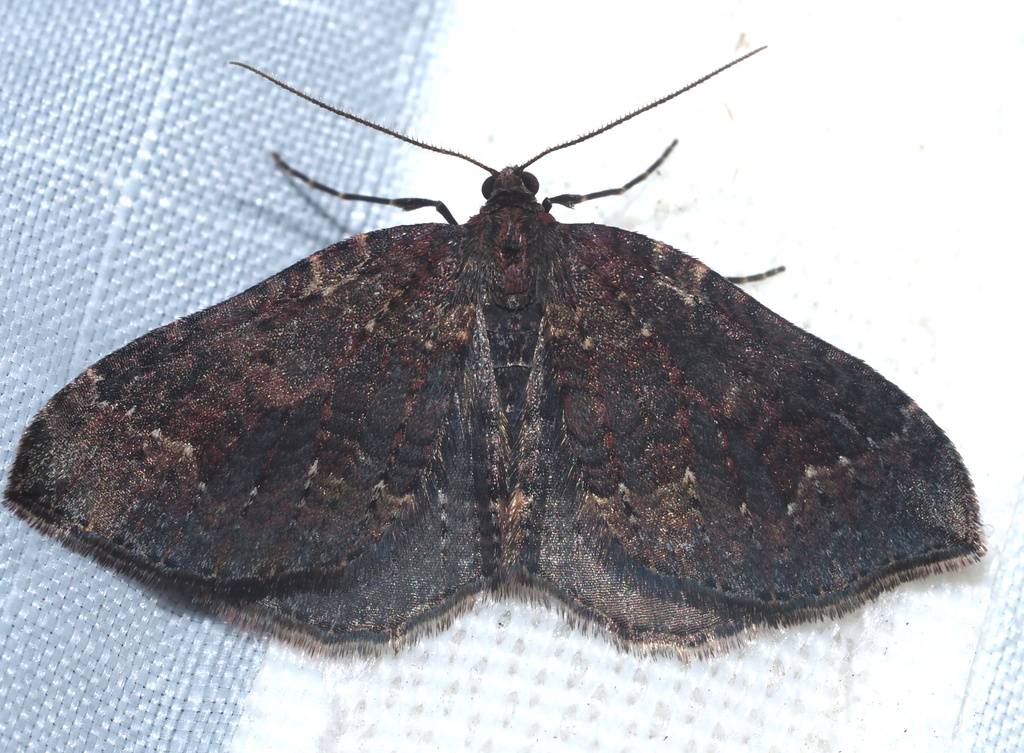

Scientific classification
- Kingdom: Animalia
- Phylum: Arthropoda
- Clade: Pancrustacea
- Class: Insecta
- Order: Lepidoptera
- Family: Geometridae
- Subfamily: Larentiinae
- Genus: Kauaiina; Riotte, 1978

= Kauaiina =

Genus of moths

Kauaiina is a genus of moths in the family Geometridae erected by Jules C. E. Riotte in 1978.

== Species ==
- Kauaiina alakaii Riotte, 1979
- Kauaiina howarthi Riotte, 1990
- Kauaiina ioxantha (Meyrick, 1899)
- Kauaiina molokaiensis Riotte, 1979
- Kauaiina montgomeryi Riotte, 1978
- Kauaiina parva Riotte, 1980
- Kauaiina rubropulverula Riotte, 1989
