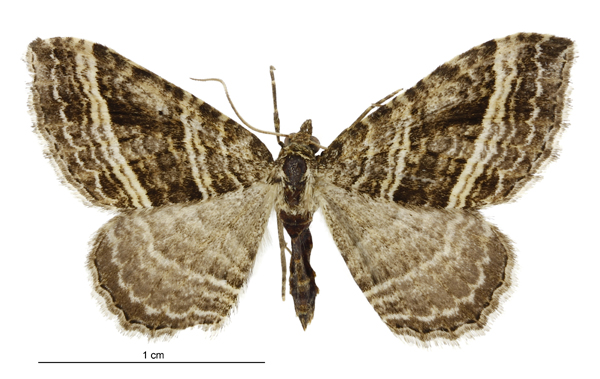
- Male specimen
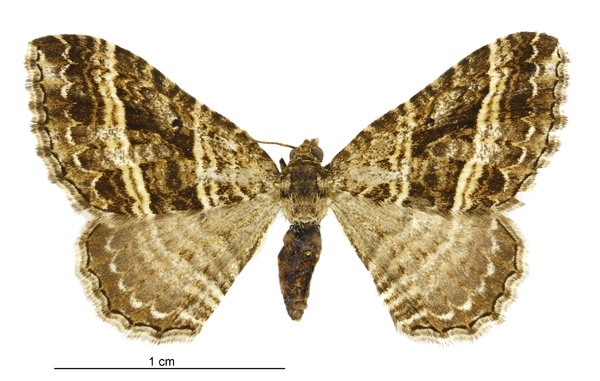
- Female specimen

Scientific classification
- Domain: Eukaryota
- Kingdom: Animalia
- Phylum: Arthropoda
- Class: Insecta
- Order: Lepidoptera
- Family: Geometridae
- Genus: Chrysolarentia
- Species: C. subrectaria

Binomial name
- Chrysolarentia subrectaria (Guenée, 1858)

Synonyms
- Coremia subrectaria Guenée, 1857; Hydriomena subrectaria (Guenée, 1857)

= Chrysolarentia subrectaria =

Species of moth

Chrysolarentia subrectaria is a species of moth of the family Geometridae. It was first described by Achille Guenée in 1858. It is found in New Zealand and Australia, including Tasmania. The holotype specimen, collected in Tasmania, is held at the National Museum of Natural History, France. There has been some confusion over the date of publication of the original description of this species. Research published in 2024 indicates that the appropriate publication date for this species should be 1858.
