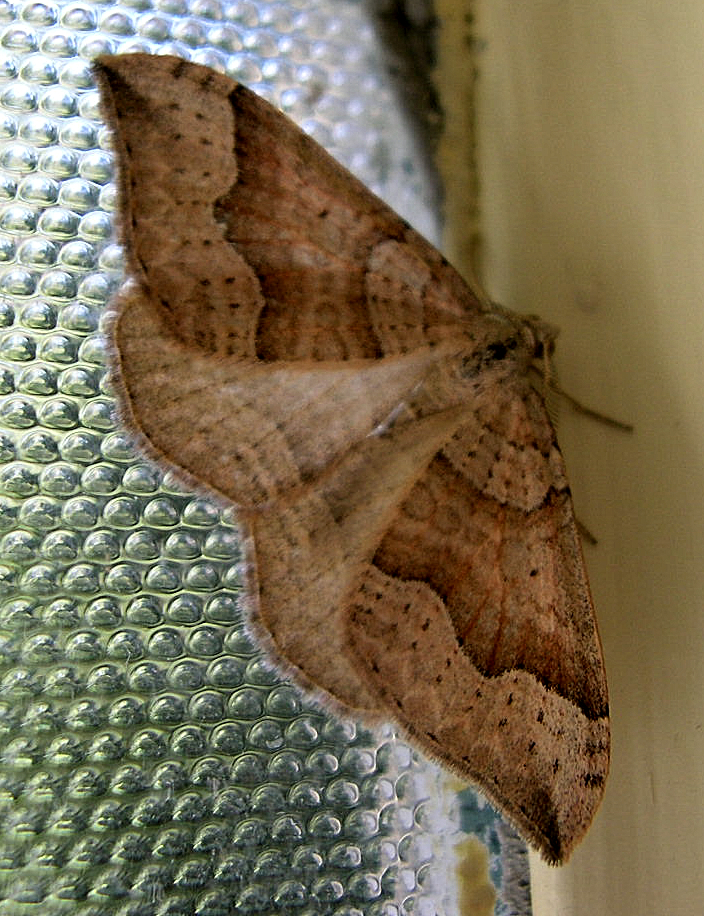

Scientific classification
- Domain: Eukaryota
- Kingdom: Animalia
- Phylum: Arthropoda
- Class: Insecta
- Order: Lepidoptera
- Family: Geometridae
- Genus: Zenophleps
- Species: Z. alpinata

Binomial name
- Zenophleps alpinata Cassino, 1927

Synonyms
- Zenophleps rosa Cassino, 1927

= Zenophleps alpinata =

Species of moth

Zenophleps alpinata is a moth of the family Geometridae first described by Samuel E. Cassino in 1927. It is found in Canada, including Alberta and British Columbia.

The wingspan is about 25 millimetres.
