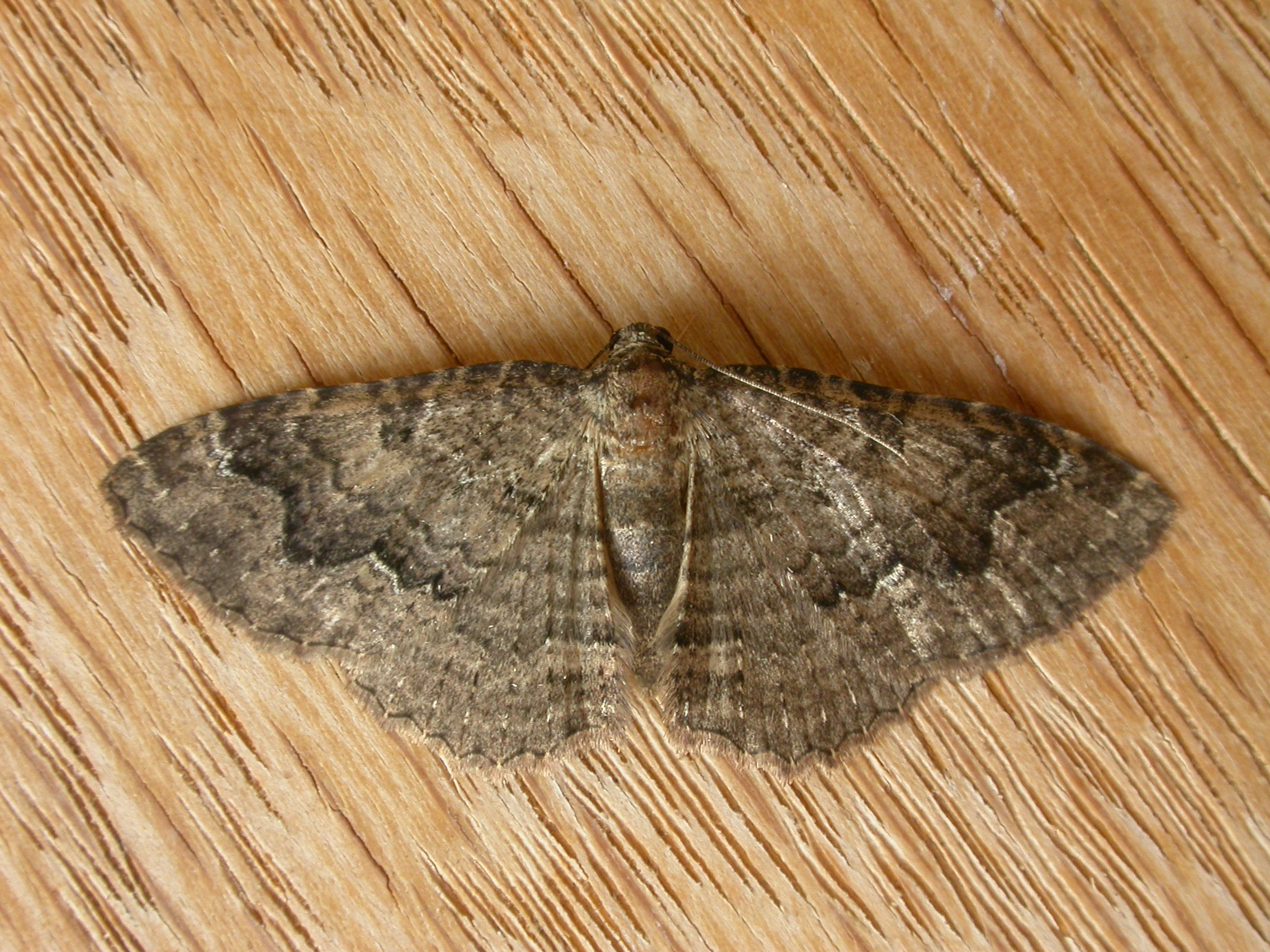
- Visiana brujata

Scientific classification
- Kingdom: Animalia
- Phylum: Arthropoda
- Class: Insecta
- Order: Lepidoptera
- Family: Geometridae
- Tribe: Xanthorhoini
- Genus: Visiana; C. Swinhoe, 1900

= Visiana =

Genus of moths

Visiana is a genus of moths in the family Geometridae described by Charles Swinhoe in 1900.

== Species ==
- Visiana fuscata Schmidt, 2009 northern India (Khasis)
- Visiana inimica (Prout, 1937) Bali, Java
- Visiana brujata (Guenée, 1857) Australia
- Visiana excentrata (Guenée, 1857) Australia
