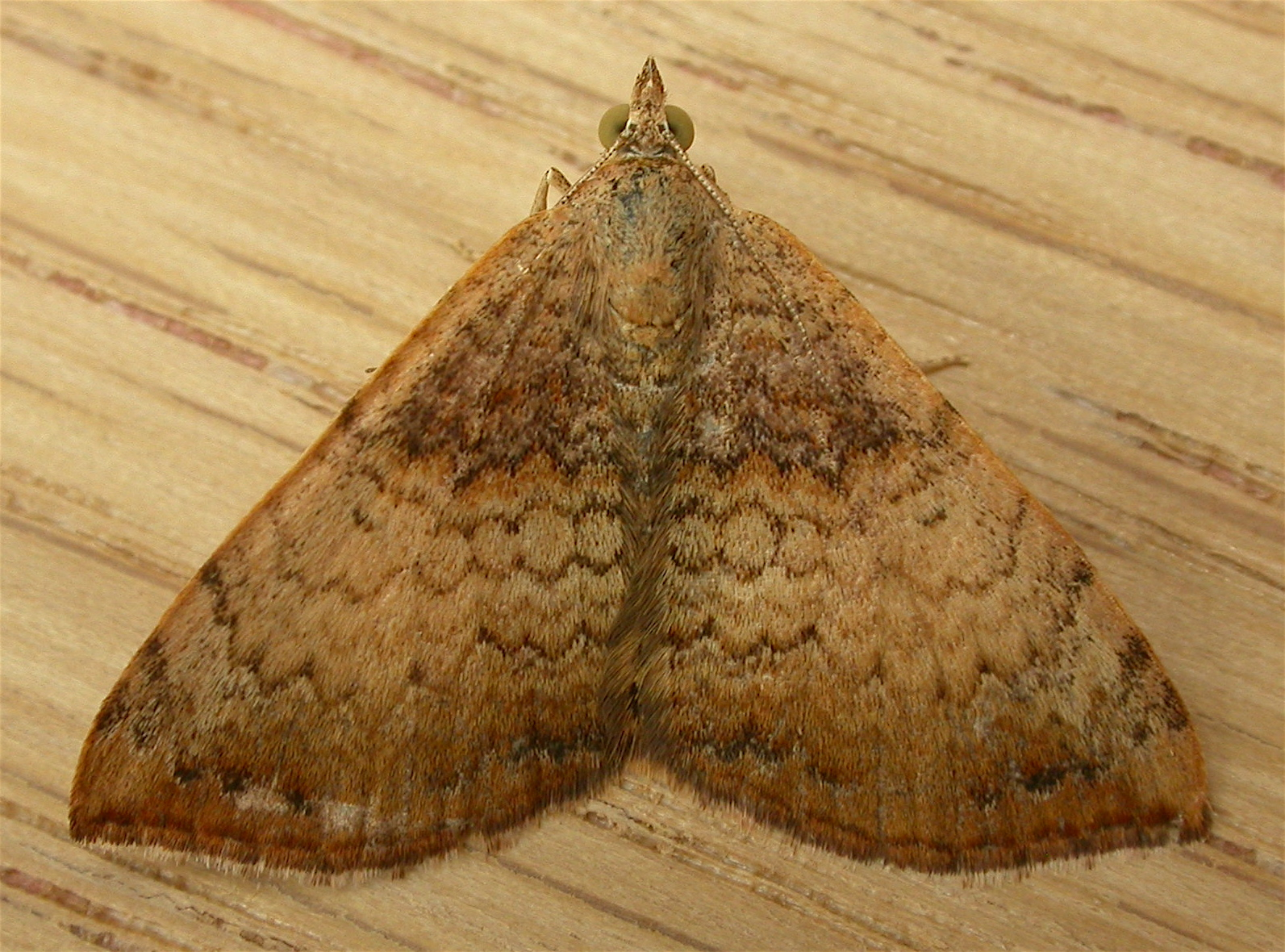

Scientific classification
- Kingdom: Animalia
- Phylum: Arthropoda
- Class: Insecta
- Order: Lepidoptera
- Family: Geometridae
- Genus: Chrysolarentia
- Species: C. mecynata

Binomial name
- Chrysolarentia mecynata Guenée, 1857

Synonyms
- Hydriomenta extramenta

= Chrysolarentia mecynata =

Species of moth

Chrysolarentia mecynata is a species of moth of the family Geometridae. It is found in Australia.

The wingspan is about 20 mm.
