= Loxofidonia cingala =

Scientific classification
- Kingdom: Animalia
- Phylum: Arthropoda
- Class: Insecta
- Order: Lepidoptera
- Family: Geometridae
- Genus: Loxofidonia
- Species: L. cingala

Binomial name
- Loxofidonia cingala Moore, 1887

Species of moth

Loxofidonia cingala is a moth of the family Geometridae first described by Frederic Moore in 1887. It is found in Sri Lanka.

Host plants of the caterpillar include Impatiens balsamina and Camellia sinensis.
