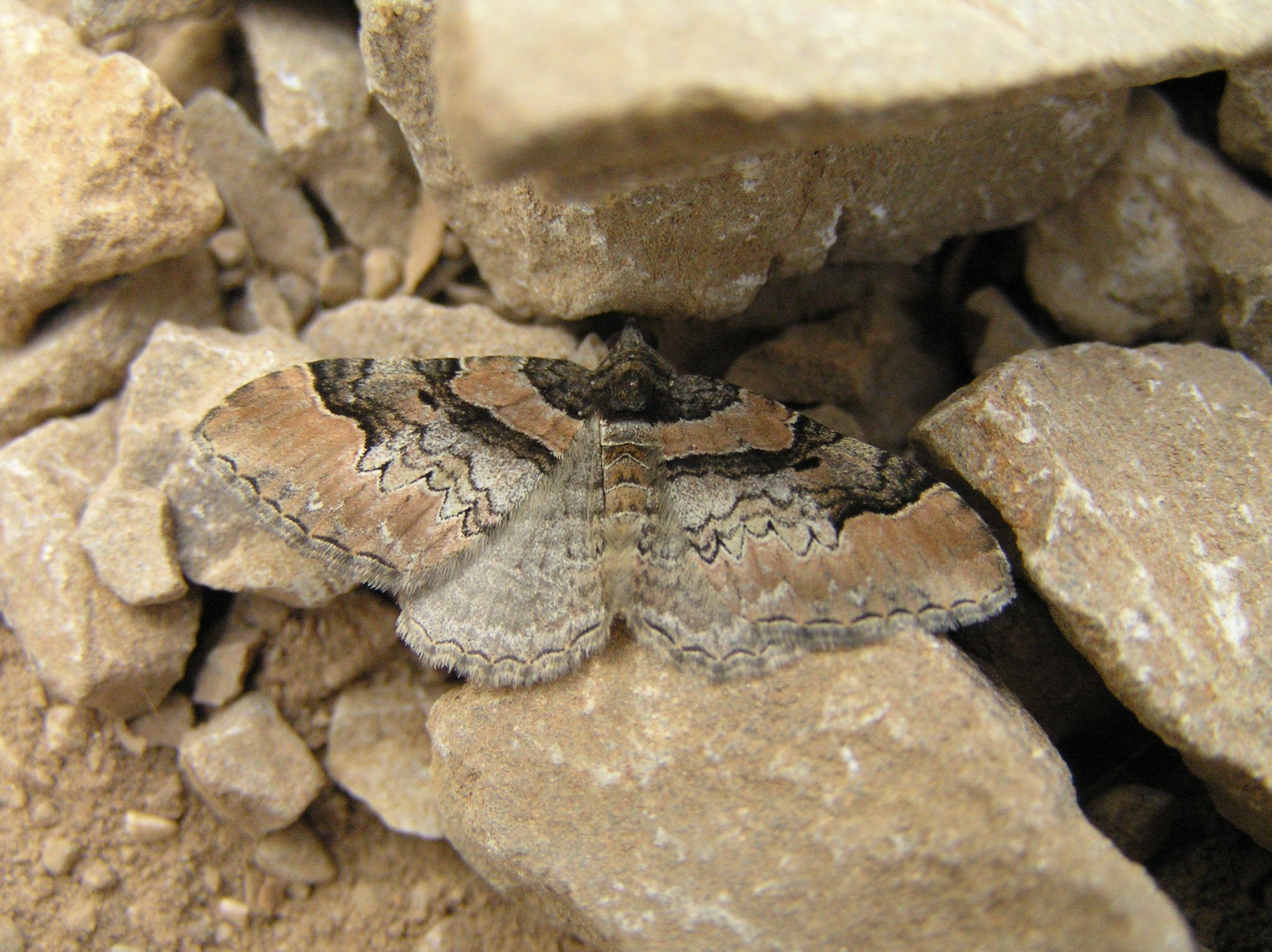

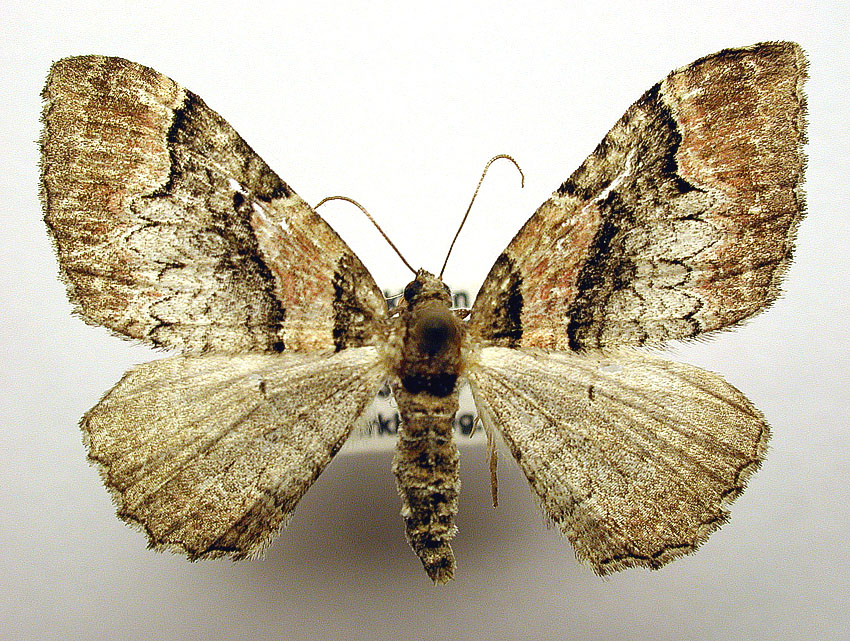

Scientific classification
- Kingdom: Animalia
- Phylum: Arthropoda
- Class: Insecta
- Order: Lepidoptera
- Family: Geometridae
- Genus: Catarhoe
- Species: C. rubidata

Binomial name
- Catarhoe rubidata (Denis & Schiffermüller, 1775)

Synonyms
- Geometra rubidata Denis & Schiffermuller, 1775; Cidaria fumata Eversmann, 1844

= Catarhoe rubidata =

Ruddy carpet

Species of moth

Catarhoe rubidata, the ruddy carpet, is a moth of the family Geometridae. The species was first described by Michael Denis and Ignaz Schiffermüller in 1775. It is found in western Europe and the Iberian Peninsula and western Central Asia.

The wingspan is 26–31 mm.

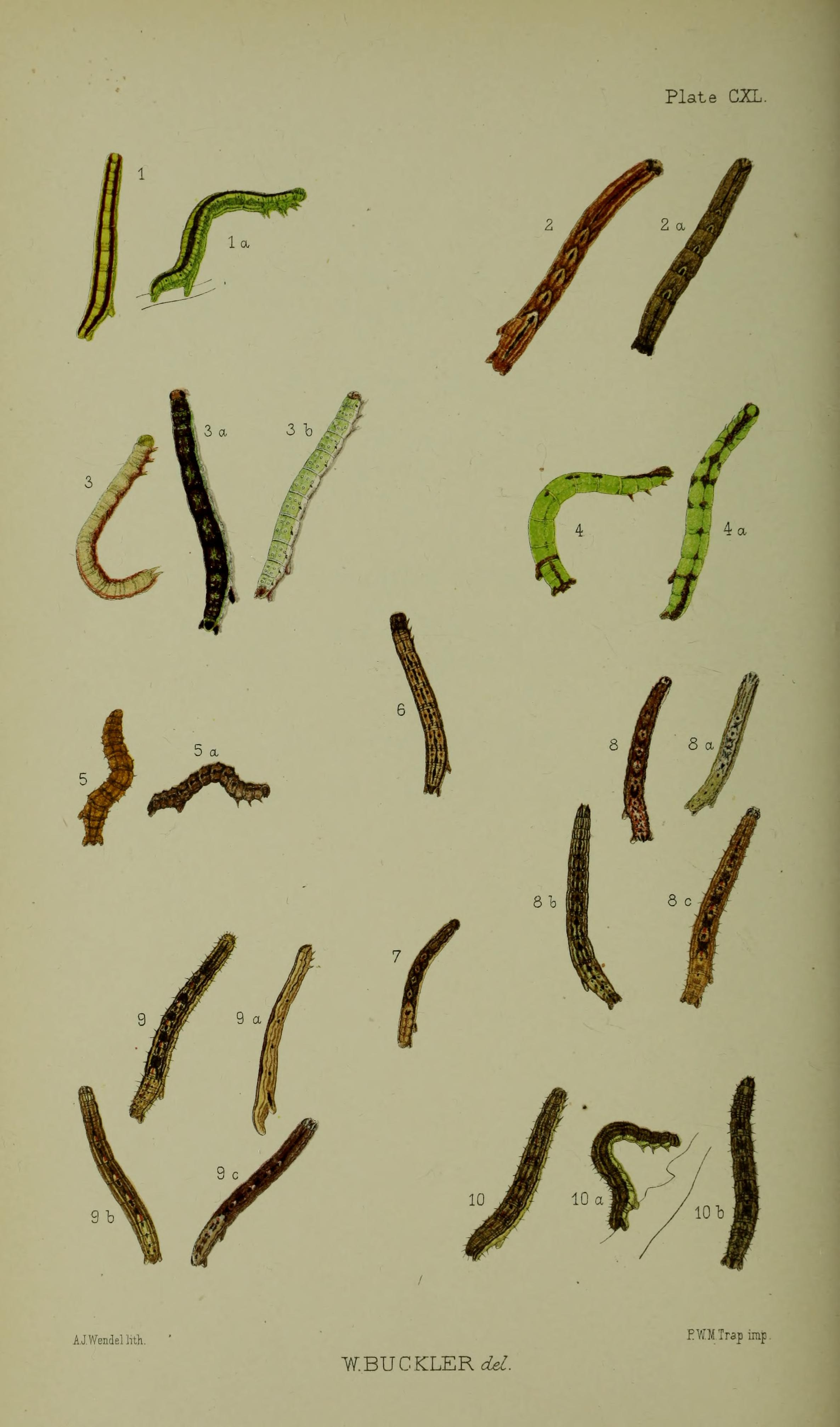
Figs 2, 2a larvae after final moult

The larvae feed on Galium species.

== Subspecies ==
- Catarhoe rubidata rubidata
- Catarhoe rubidata fumata (Eversmann 1844)
