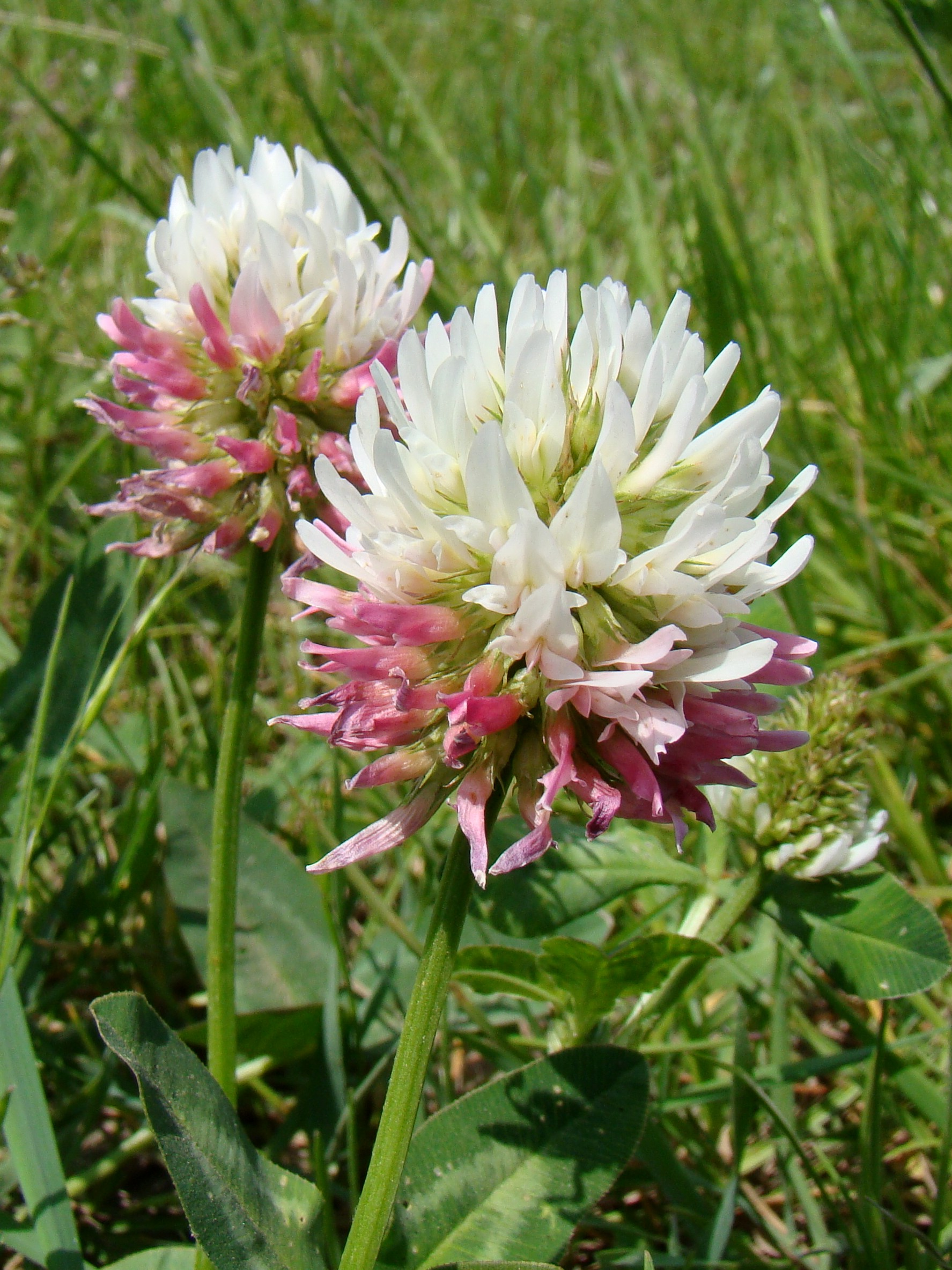
- Flowers
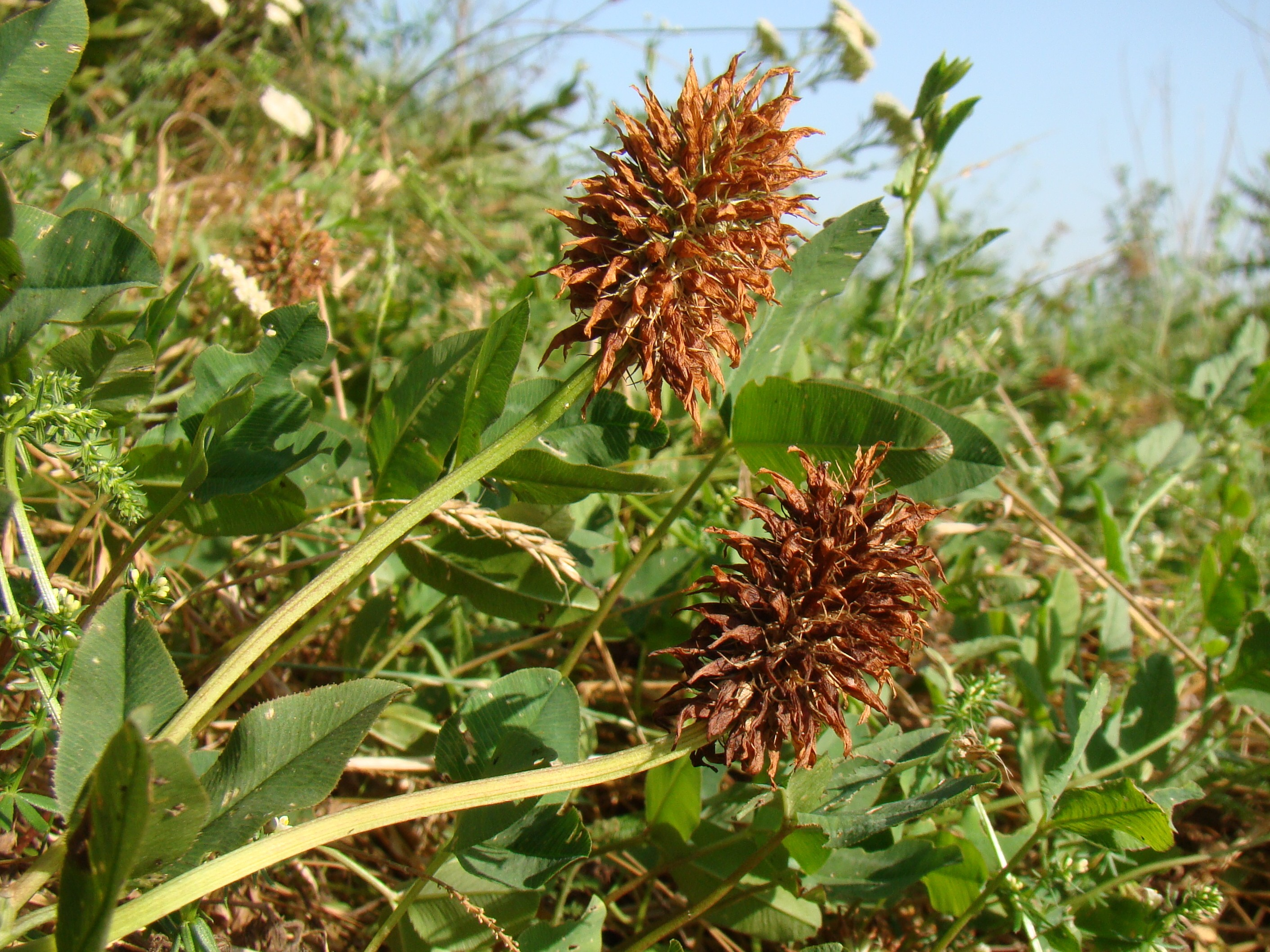
- Seed pods

Scientific classification
- Kingdom: Plantae
- Clade: Embryophytes
- Clade: Tracheophytes
- Clade: Spermatophytes
- Clade: Angiosperms
- Clade: Eudicots
- Clade: Rosids
- Order: Fabales
- Family: Fabaceae
- Subfamily: Faboideae
- Genus: Trifolium
- Species: T. ambiguum

Binomial name
- Trifolium ambiguum M.Bieb.

Synonyms
- Amoria ambigua (M.Bieb.) Soják; Trifolium vaillantii M.Bieb. ex Fisch.

= Trifolium ambiguum =

Species of flowering plant

Trifolium ambiguum, the kura clover or Caucasian clover, is a species of flowering plant in the family Fabaceae. It is native to Ukraine, Crimea, south European Russia, the northern Caucasus, eastern Turkey, Iraq, and Iran, and has been introduced to New South Wales. Planted for forage, once established it is tolerant of close grazing, and is also useful for honey production.
