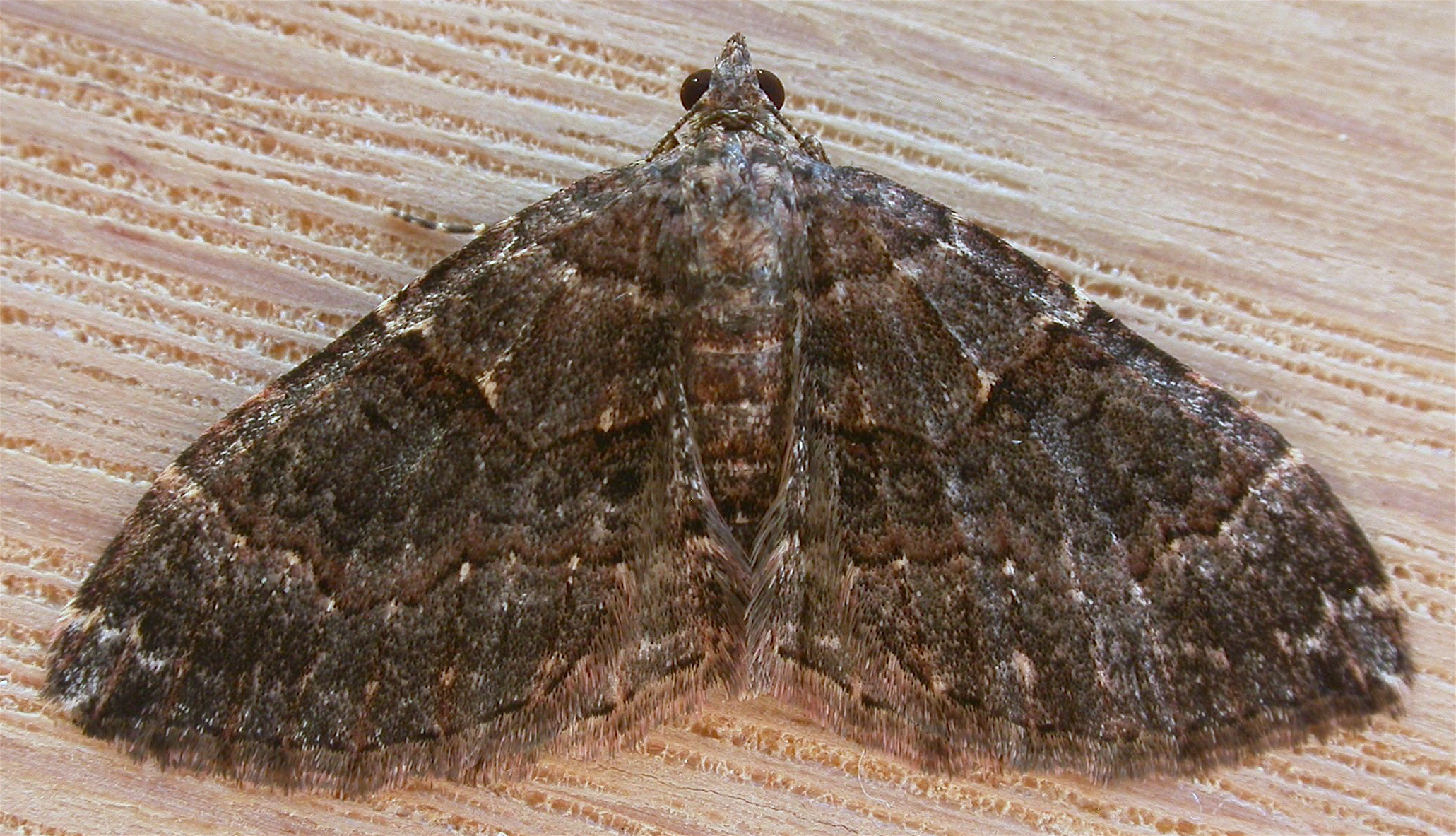
- Epyaxa sodaliata

Scientific classification
- Kingdom: Animalia
- Phylum: Arthropoda
- Class: Insecta
- Order: Lepidoptera
- Family: Geometridae
- Tribe: Xanthorhoini
- Genus: Epyaxa; Meyrick, 1883

= Epyaxa =

Genus of moths

Epyaxa is a genus of moths in the family Geometridae erected by Edward Meyrick in 1883.

== Species ==
- Epyaxa agelasta (Turner, 1904)
- Epyaxa centroneura (Meyrick, 1891)
- Epyaxa epia (Turner, 1922)
- Epyaxa hyperythra (Lower, 1892)
- Epyaxa lucidata Walker, 1862
- Epyaxa pyrrhobaphes (Turner, 1926)
- Epyaxa rosearia Doubleday, 1843 – New Zealand looper, plantain moth
- Epyaxa sodaliata (Walker, 1862)
- Epyaxa subidaria (Guenée, 1857) – subidaria moth
