= Jules C. E. Riotte =

German Catholic priest and dissident

Jules C. E. Riotte (1901 – May 6, 2000) was a German-born priest of the Ukrainian Catholic Eparchy of Saint Nicholas in Chicago, and a researcher at the Bernice Pauahi Bishop Museum in Honolulu. He was born in Dresden, Germany of mixed French and Lusatian Sorb heritage. During the Second World War, he was active in the resistance movement against the Nazis and he was briefly interned in the Sachsenhausen concentration camp. As a POW, he was sent to Great Britain and worked for the British Broadcasting Corporation as a translator of German and Slavic languages.

He became a Ukrainian Catholic priest and moved to Canada, where he served in many different parishes and missions, including St Michael's Ukrainian Catholic Parish in Kingston, Ontario. He was an advocate for Ukraine's independence from Soviet tyranny. A research associate at the Department of Entomology at the Royal Ontario Museum Riotte eventually published over 100 papers in the field.

In 1975, Riotte moved to Hawai‘i, where he worked as a researcher in entomology at the Bishop Museum. He resided at St. Anthony Roman Catholic Church in Kalihi and also served as pastor and episcopal vicar to Eastern Rite Catholics in the Roman Catholic Diocese of Honolulu, Hawai‘i, conducting daily Divine Liturgy in the Kalihi church. Later, a permanent Ukrainian Catholic church was built in Wai‘anae and dedicated under the title of Saint Sophia.

He was a prolific author of papers in Hawaiian entomology. After his death his remains were returned to Kingston, Ontario, where he was buried in St Mary's Roman Catholic cemetery thanks to the support of the Ukrainian Canadian Club of Kingston and the Kingston Branch of the League of Ukrainian Canadians; a marker recalling his contributions as a man of faith and of science is maintained in that cemetery by the Ukrainian Canadian community there.
