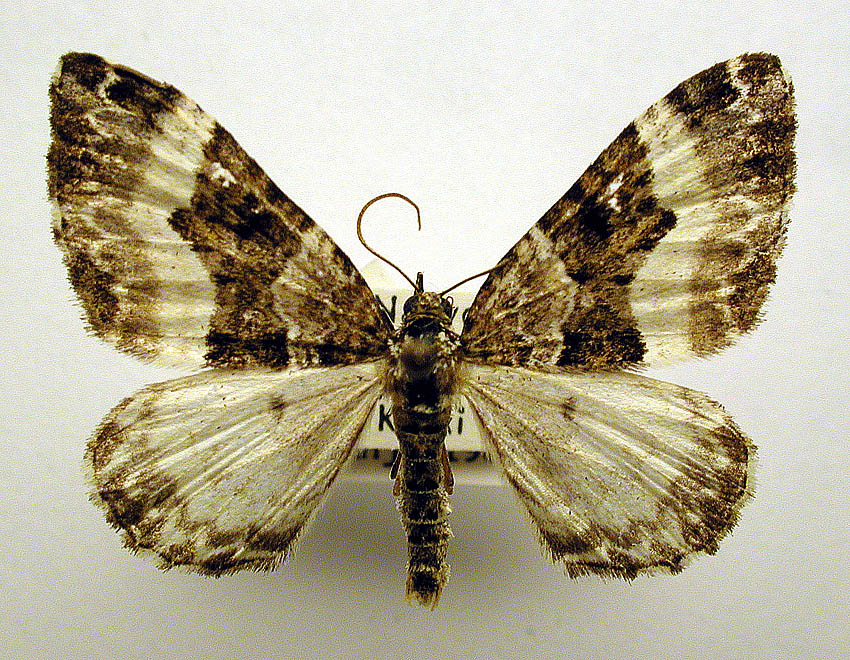

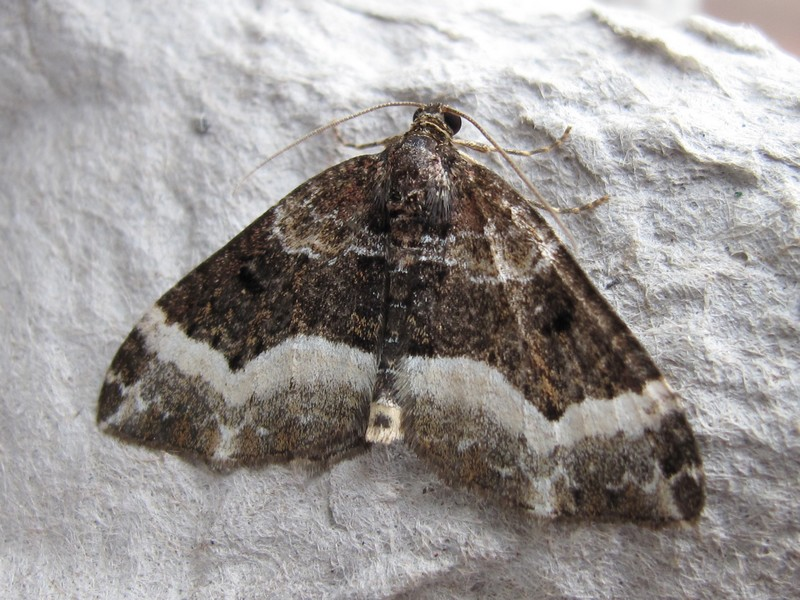

Scientific classification
- Kingdom: Animalia
- Phylum: Arthropoda
- Class: Insecta
- Order: Lepidoptera
- Family: Geometridae
- Genus: Euphyia
- Species: E. unangulata

Binomial name
- Euphyia unangulata (Haworth, 1809)

Synonyms
- Phalaena unangulata Haworth, 1809

= Euphyia unangulata =

Sharp-angled carpet

Species of moth

Euphyia unangulata, the sharp-angled carpet, is a moth of the family Geometridae. It shares its common name with the similarly coloured Neoarctic, Euphyia intermediata.

== Description ==
The wingspan is 25–28 mm. The forewing has a brownish central band. The white outer edge of this band is sharply angled. There is also a narrow white line in the basal area of the forewings. There are two dark discal spots in the central area of the band. The larva is purplish brown with a variety of black and white square spots along the back. It has rather short bristles. .

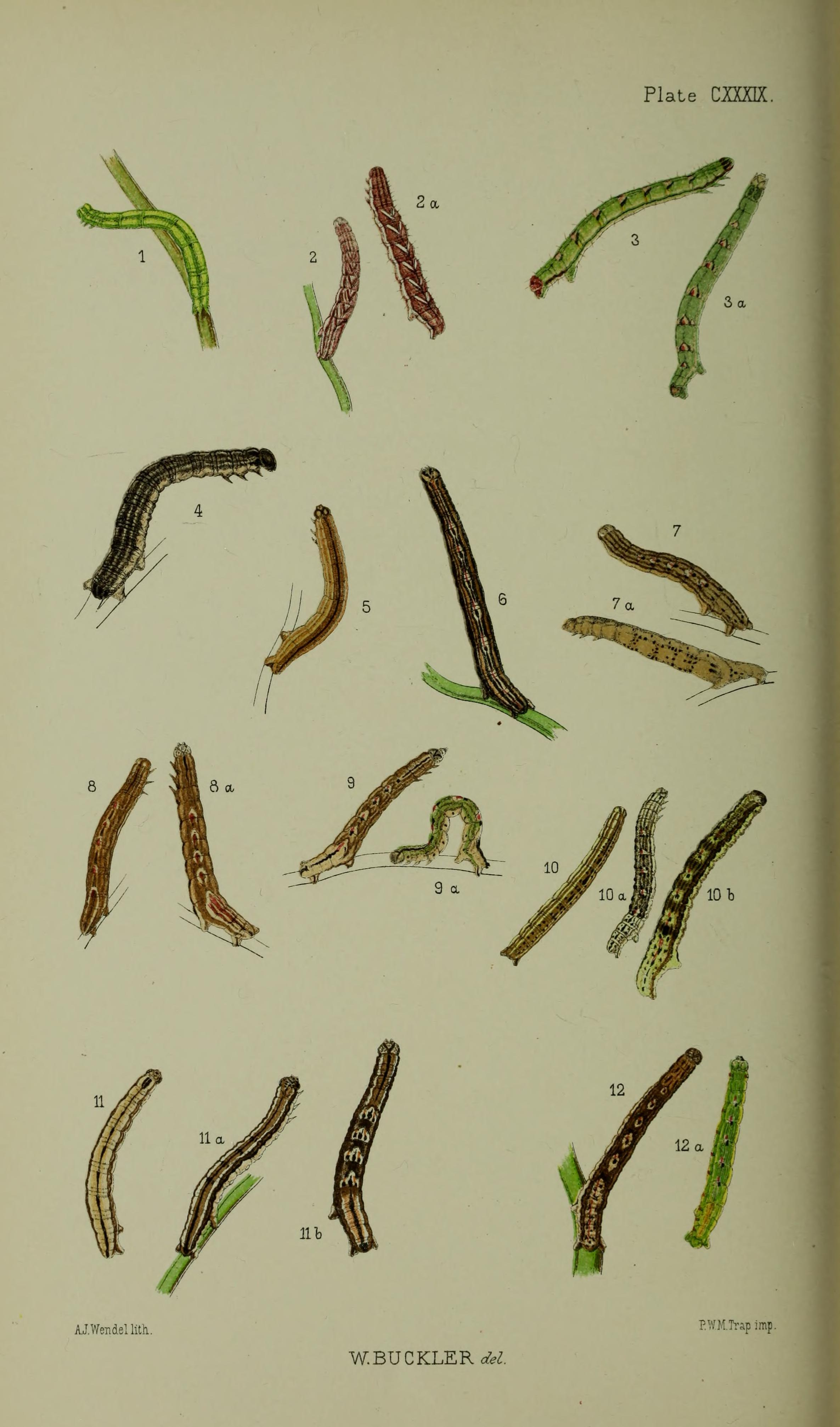
Fig.7, 7a larvae after final moult

== Distribution ==
It is found from most of Europe across the Palearctic to Japan and the Kamchatka Peninsula.

== Behaviour ==
Adults are on wing from mid April to August. There are two generations per year.

The larvae feed on Stellaria species, including Stellaria media. Larvae can be found from June to September. The species overwinters as a pupa.

== Subspecies ==
- Euphyia unangulata unangulata
- Euphyia unangulata gracilaria (Bang-Haas, 1906)
- Euphyia unangulata tonnaichana (Matsumura, 1925)
- Euphyia unangulata renei (Bryk, 1948) (Kamchatka, northern Kurils)
