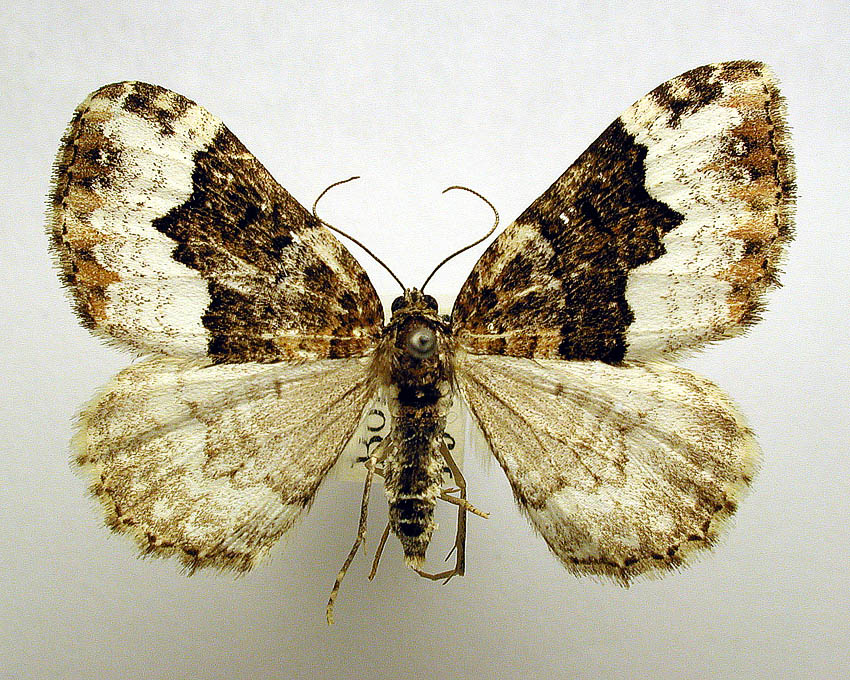

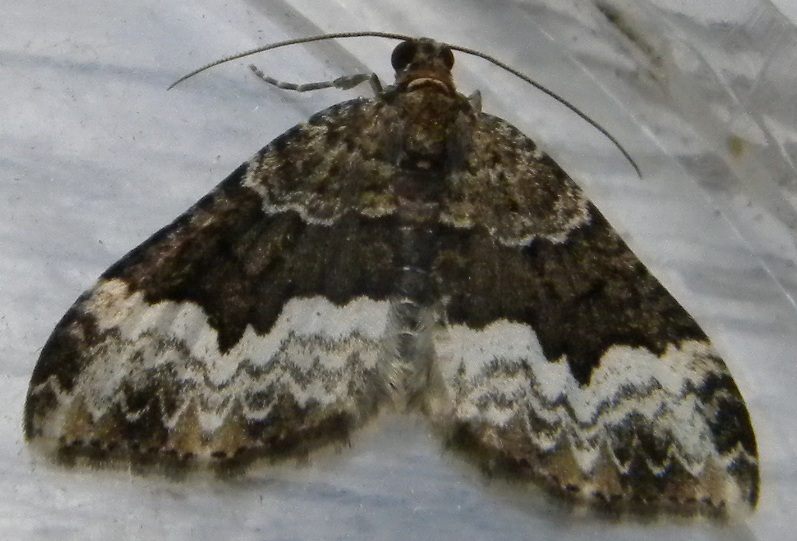

Scientific classification
- Kingdom: Animalia
- Phylum: Arthropoda
- Class: Insecta
- Order: Lepidoptera
- Family: Geometridae
- Genus: Euphyia
- Species: E. biangulata

Binomial name
- Euphyia biangulata (Haworth, 1809)

Synonyms
- Phalaena biangulata Haworth, 1809; Geometra picata Hubner, 1813; Cidaria baltica Prout, 1939

= Euphyia biangulata =

Cloaked carpet

Species of moth

Euphyia biangulata, the cloaked carpet, is a moth of the family Geometridae. It is found in most of Europe (including West Russia) and the Middle East.

The wingspan is 25–30 mm. The forewings show a contrast between the dark brown midfield cross-band and the paler brown basal field with the distal cream band. There are two projections of the dark brown midfield cross-band into the cream band. The dark brown midfield cross-band has a black oblong discal spot. The basal field has greenish scaling. Hindwings are plain whitish, pale fuscous or very light grey, striated grey; with a clear dark discal mark. The stout caterpillar is yellowish brown, or sometimes reddish brown; there is a series of blackish or dark-brown spots along the back, and a stripe of dusky freckles along each side; lower down are two slender wavy lines enclosing a dusky stripe. The head is yellowish-brown mottled with darker brown.

Adults are on wing from the end of June to August. There is one generation per year.

The larvae feed on Stellaria species, including Stellaria media. Larvae can be found from July to September. The species overwinters as a pupa.

== Subspecies ==
- Euphyia biangulata biangulata
- Euphyia biangulata picata (Hübner, 1813)
- Euphyia biangulata baltica (Prout, 1938)
