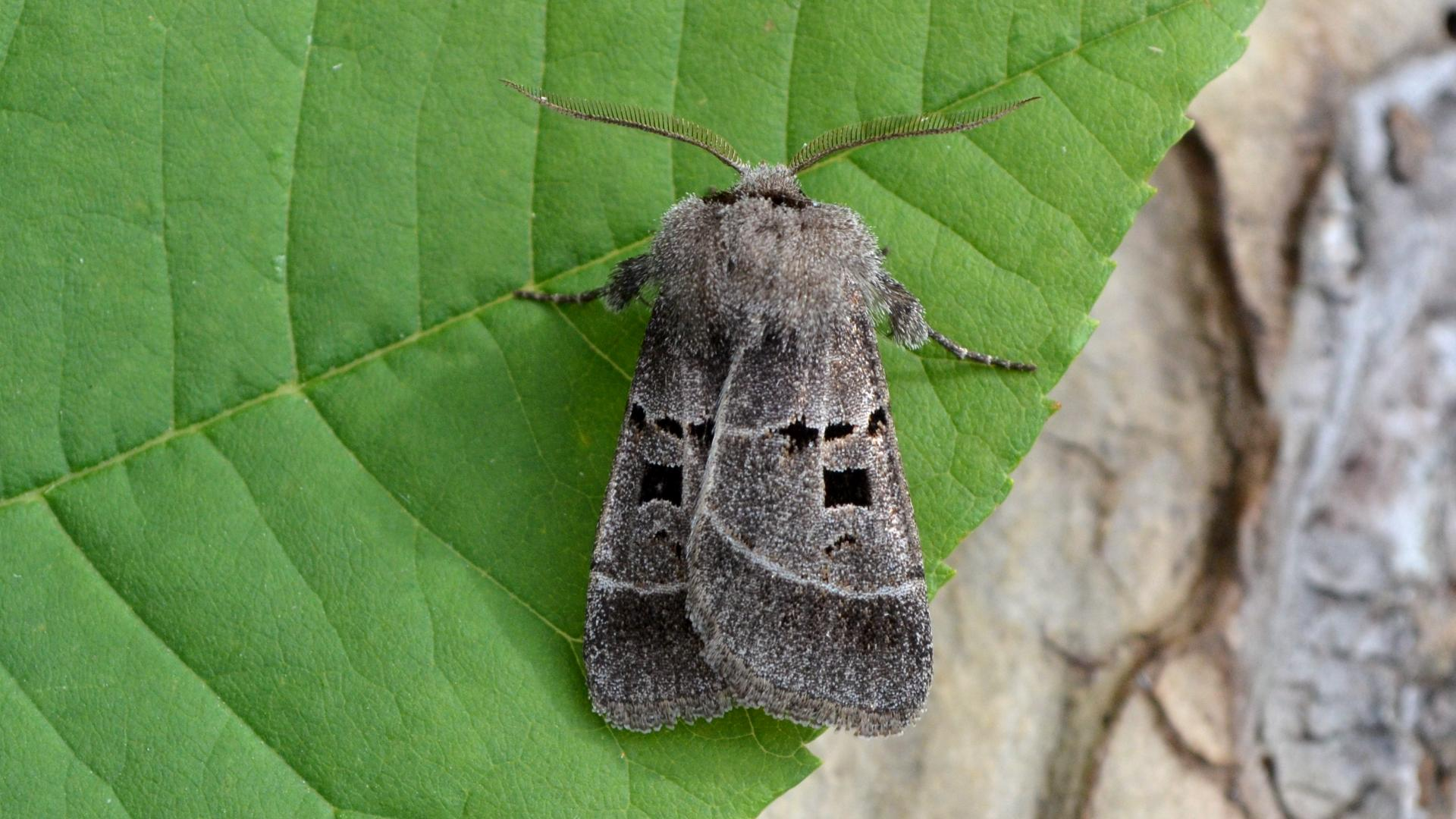

Scientific classification
- Kingdom: Animalia
- Phylum: Arthropoda
- Class: Insecta
- Order: Lepidoptera
- Superfamily: Noctuoidea
- Family: Noctuidae
- Genus: Agnorisma
- Species: A. bollii

Binomial name
- Agnorisma bollii Grote, 1881

Synonyms
- Xestia bollii; Agrotis hilaris

= Agnorisma bollii =

Species of moth

Agnorisma bollii is a moth of the family Noctuidae. This species of moth is "apparently rare" in its range with occurrences in a limited number of states west of the Appalachians, and the Chesapeake Bay region of Maryland. The range of this species appears to be in the states of Maryland, Ohio, Kentucky, Arkansas and Kansas. There were specimens discovered in South Carolina, but is too soon to tell if the species is newly introduced or a remnant population.

The wingspan is about 32 mm. Adults are on wing from August to October depending on the location.

The larval host plant is unknown.
