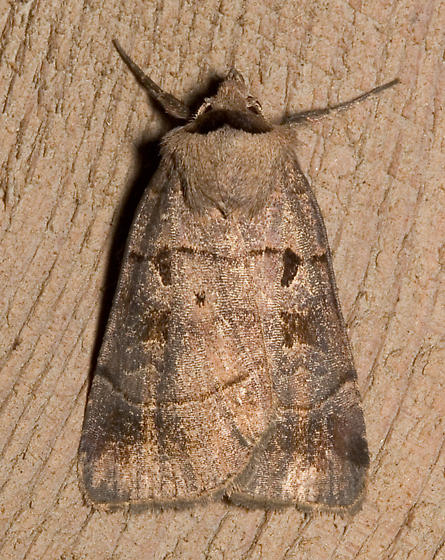

Scientific classification
- Domain: Eukaryota
- Kingdom: Animalia
- Phylum: Arthropoda
- Class: Insecta
- Order: Lepidoptera
- Superfamily: Noctuoidea
- Family: Noctuidae
- Genus: Agnorisma
- Species: A. badinodis

Binomial name
- Agnorisma badinodis Grote, 1874

Synonyms
- Xestia badinodis; Agrotis badinodis; Agnorisma hero (Morrison, 1876)

= Agnorisma badinodis =

Species of moth

Agnorisma badinodis (pale-banded dart or spotted-sided cutworm) is a moth of the family Noctuidae. It is found in southern Canada and United States, east of the 100th meridian, and exclusive of the Deep South.

The wingspan is about 36 mm. There is one generation per year.

Recorded food plants include Brassica nigra, Malus, Medicago sativa, Nicotiana tabacum, Rumex crispus, Sisymbrium officinale, Stellaria media, Symphyotrichum ericoides, Trifolium, Triticum aestivum and Vitis.
