= Euphyia swetti =

Scientific classification
- Domain: Eukaryota
- Kingdom: Animalia
- Phylum: Arthropoda
- Class: Insecta
- Order: Lepidoptera
- Family: Geometridae
- Tribe: Xanthorhoini
- Genus: Euphyia
- Species: E. swetti

Binomial name
- Euphyia swetti Cassino, 1927

Species of moth

Euphyia swetti is a species of geometrid moth in the family Geometridae. It is found in North America.

The MONA or Hodges number for Euphyia swetti is 7398.
