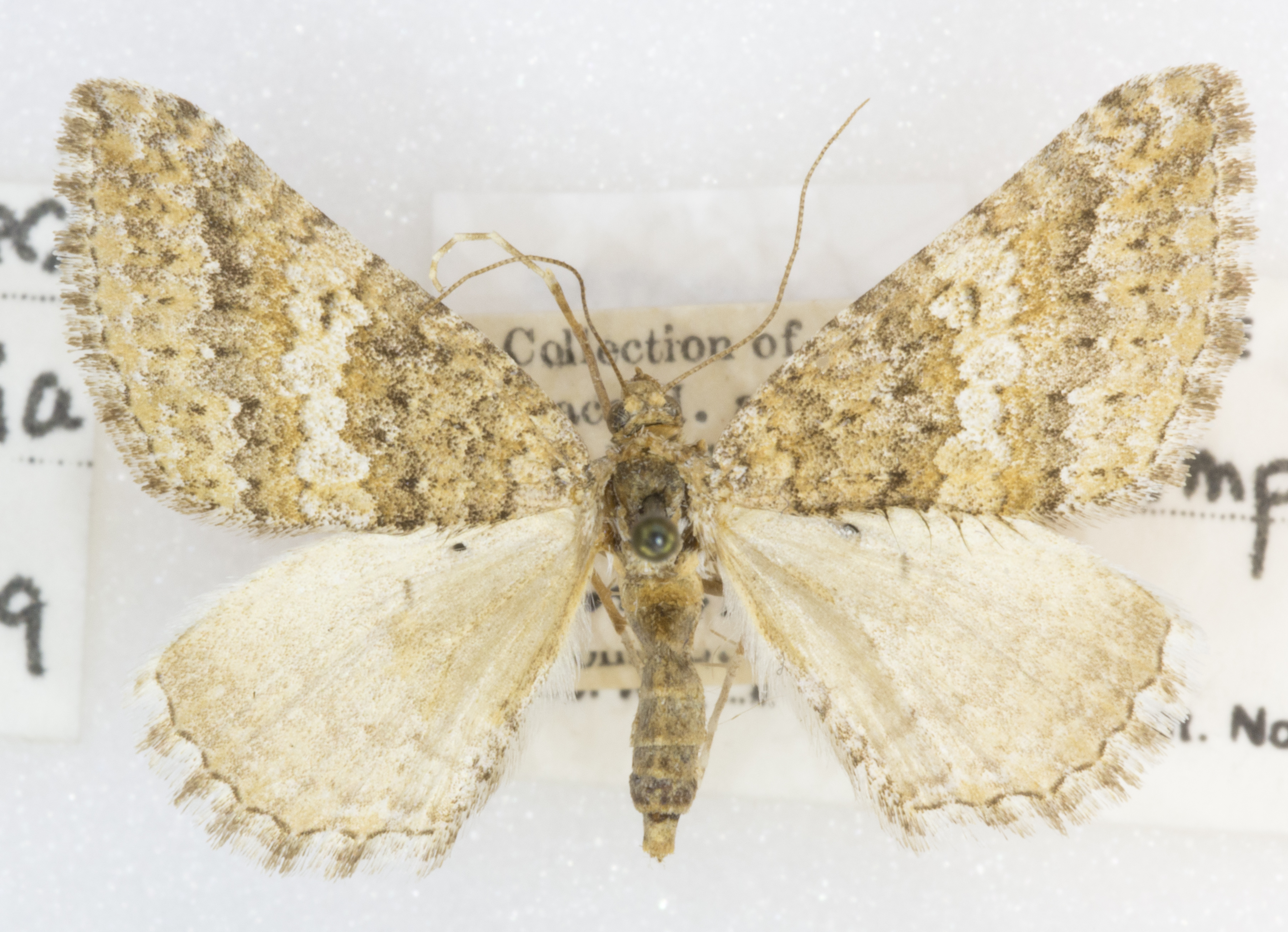

Scientific classification
- Kingdom: Animalia
- Phylum: Arthropoda
- Clade: Pancrustacea
- Class: Insecta
- Order: Lepidoptera
- Family: Geometridae
- Tribe: Xanthorhoini
- Genus: Euphyia
- Species: E. implicata

Binomial name
- Euphyia implicata (Guenée in Boisduval & Guenée, 1858)

= Euphyia implicata =

Species of moth

Euphyia implicata is a species of geometrid moth in the family Geometridae. It is found in North America.
