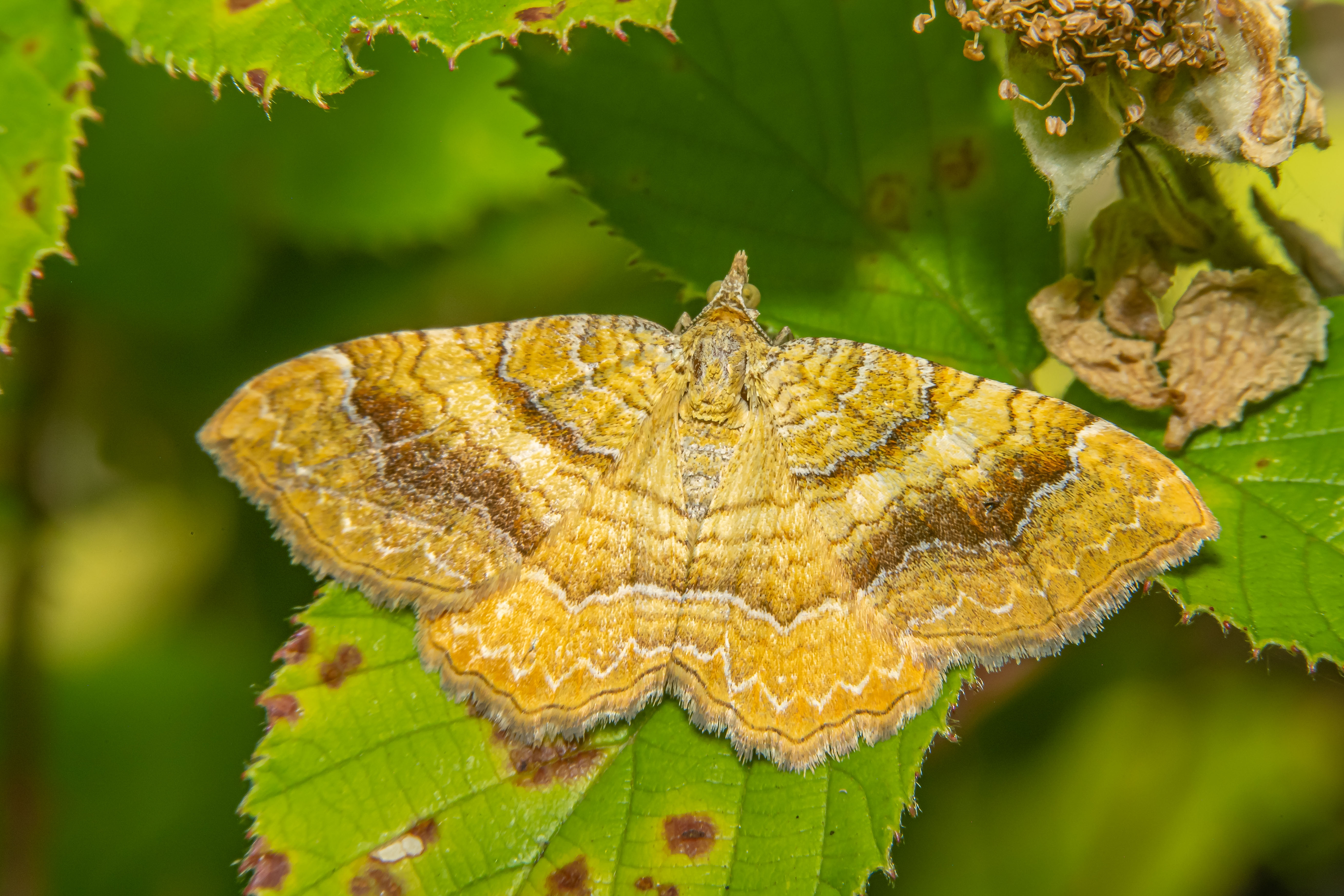

Scientific classification
- Kingdom: Animalia
- Phylum: Arthropoda
- Clade: Pancrustacea
- Class: Insecta
- Order: Lepidoptera
- Family: Geometridae
- Genus: Camptogramma
- Species: C. bilineata

Binomial name
- Camptogramma bilineata (Linnaeus, 1758)

= Camptogramma bilineata =

Species of moth

Camptogramma bilineata, the yellow shell, is a colourful moth of the family Geometridae. The species was first described by Carl Linnaeus in his 1758 10th edition of Systema Naturae. It can be found in Europe and east across the Palearctic to the Altai Mountains.

== Description ==
The wingspan is 20–25 mm. The color of the forewings and hindwings is yellow to ochre brown (occasionally light). The forewings and hindwings are covered with brown or white serrated crossbars. There are usually three or four distinct white crossbars, which may be bordered by a black line. The wing margin is black and wavy. The yellowish eggs are round, only slightly flattened at the pole. The surface shows a large mesh. There are warts on the intersections. The caterpillars are greenish to slightly brownish with obvious segment incisions. The dorsal line is darker than the body color. The lateral line, on the other hand, is often brighter. The head is usually light brown and relatively small. The pupa is reddish brown with a short cremaster, consisting of two small bristles. The thoracic area and the wings have a brownish-greenish hue.

== Biology ==
The species shows no preferences for special biotopes. It flies both in forest and open lands, as well as in wet and dry places. On herbaceous forest edges, however, there is a higher density of moths. In the Alps it is found up to 1,600 metres above sea level. It is common, but in very different numbers from year to year.

The moths fly from June to August..

The larvae feed on various low-growing plants such as chickweed, sorrel and other species from the family Polygonaceae.

== Gallery ==
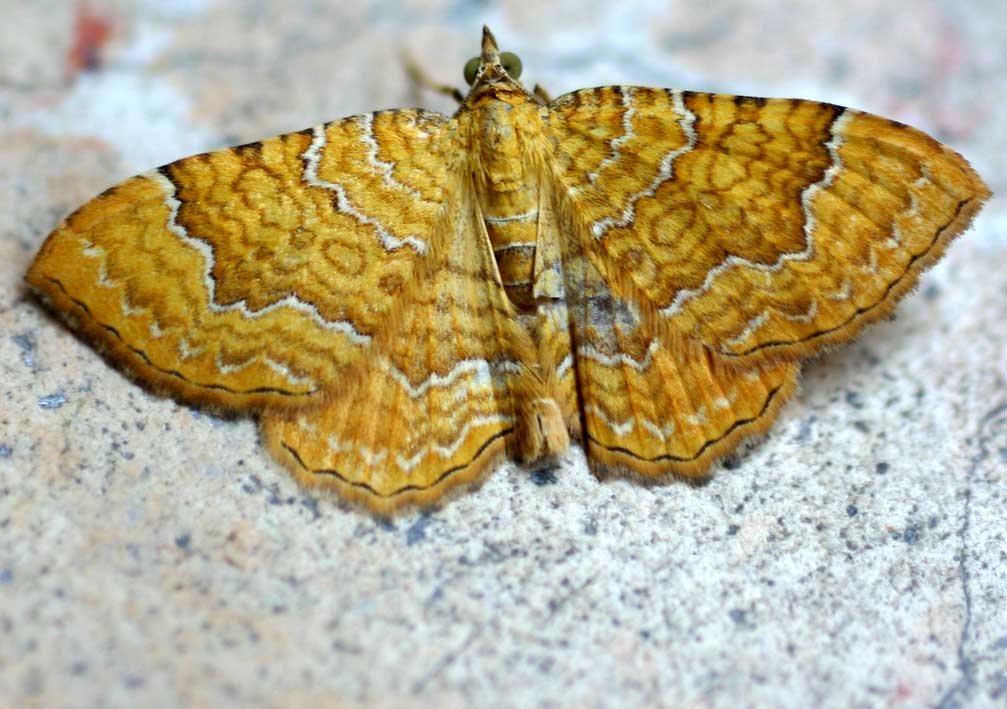
Male

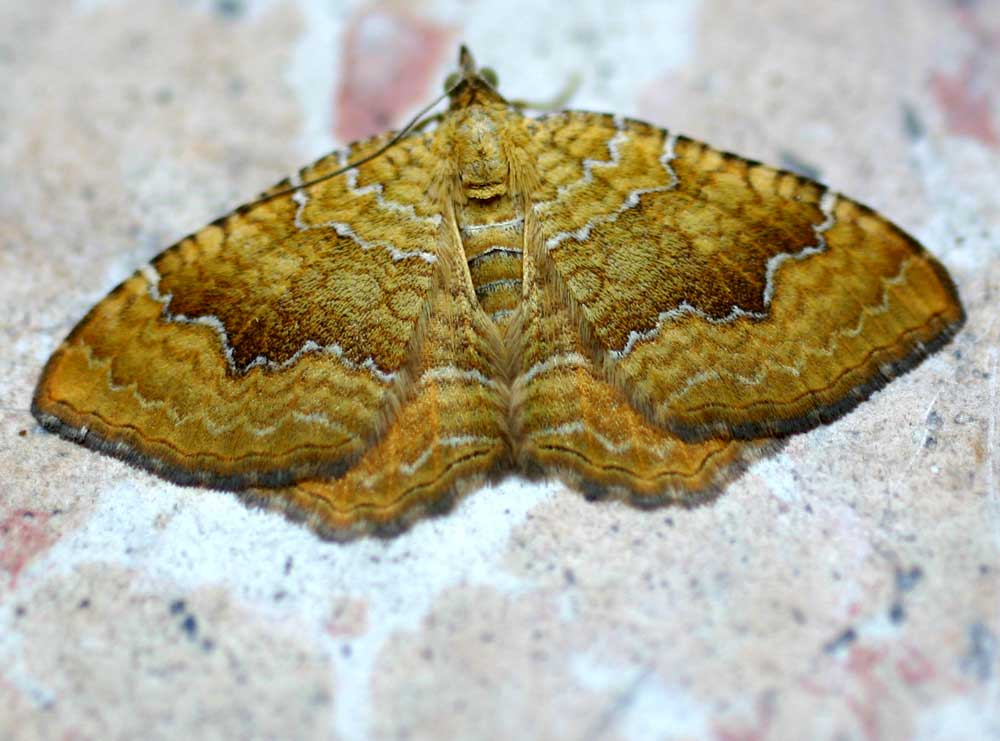
Female

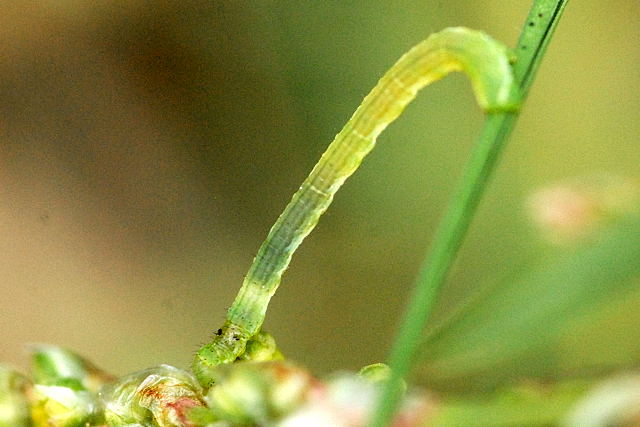
Caterpillar

== Notes ==
1. The flight season refers to the British Isles. This may vary in other parts of the range.
