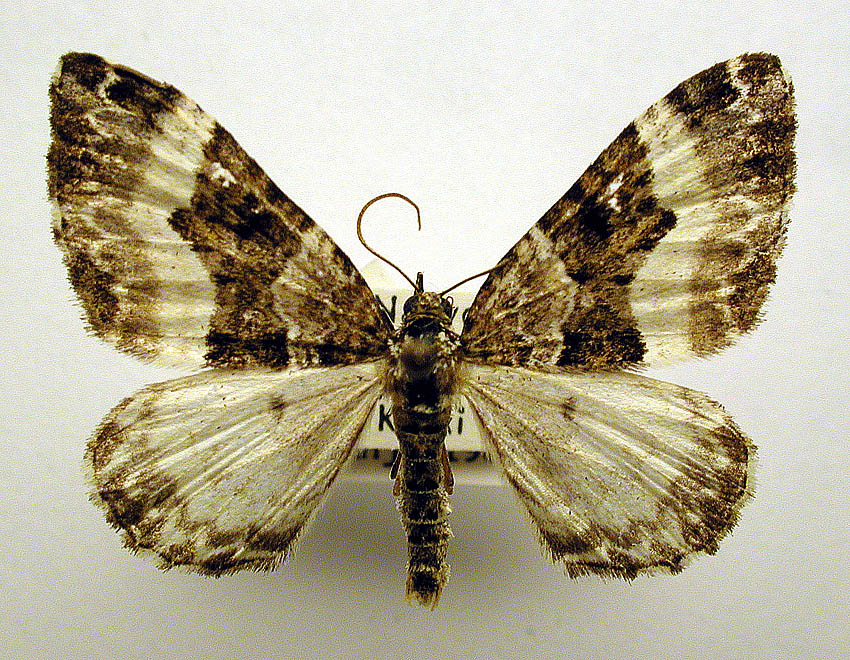
- Euphyia unangulata

Scientific classification
- Kingdom: Animalia
- Phylum: Arthropoda
- Clade: Pancrustacea
- Class: Insecta
- Order: Lepidoptera
- Family: Geometridae
- Tribe: Xanthorhoini
- Genus: Euphyia; Hübner, 1825

Synonyms
- Anapalta Warren, 1904; Camptogramma Stephens, 1831; Orthoprora Warren, 1904; Warrenia Prout, 1910

= Euphyia =

Genus of moths

Euphyia is a genus of moths in the family Geometridae erected by Jacob Hübner in 1825.

== Species ==
- Euphyia adumbraria (Herrich-Schäffer, 1852)
- Euphyia biangulata (Haworth, 1809) – cloaked carpet
- Euphyia chalusata Wiltshire, 1970
- Euphyia cineraria (Butler, 1878)
- Euphyia coangulata (Prout, 1938)
- Euphyia frustata (Treitschke, 1828)
- Euphyia implicata (Guenée, 1857)
- Euphyia intermediata (Guenée, 1858) – sharp-angled carpet
- Euphyia khorassana Brandt, 1941
- Euphyia mesembrina (Rebel, 1927)
- Euphyia minima Cassino & Swett, 1922
- Euphyia scripturata (Hübner, 1799)
- Euphyia sintenisi (Staudinger, 1892)
- Euphyia swetti Cassino, 1927
- Euphyia unangulata (Haworth, 1809) – sharp-angled carpet
