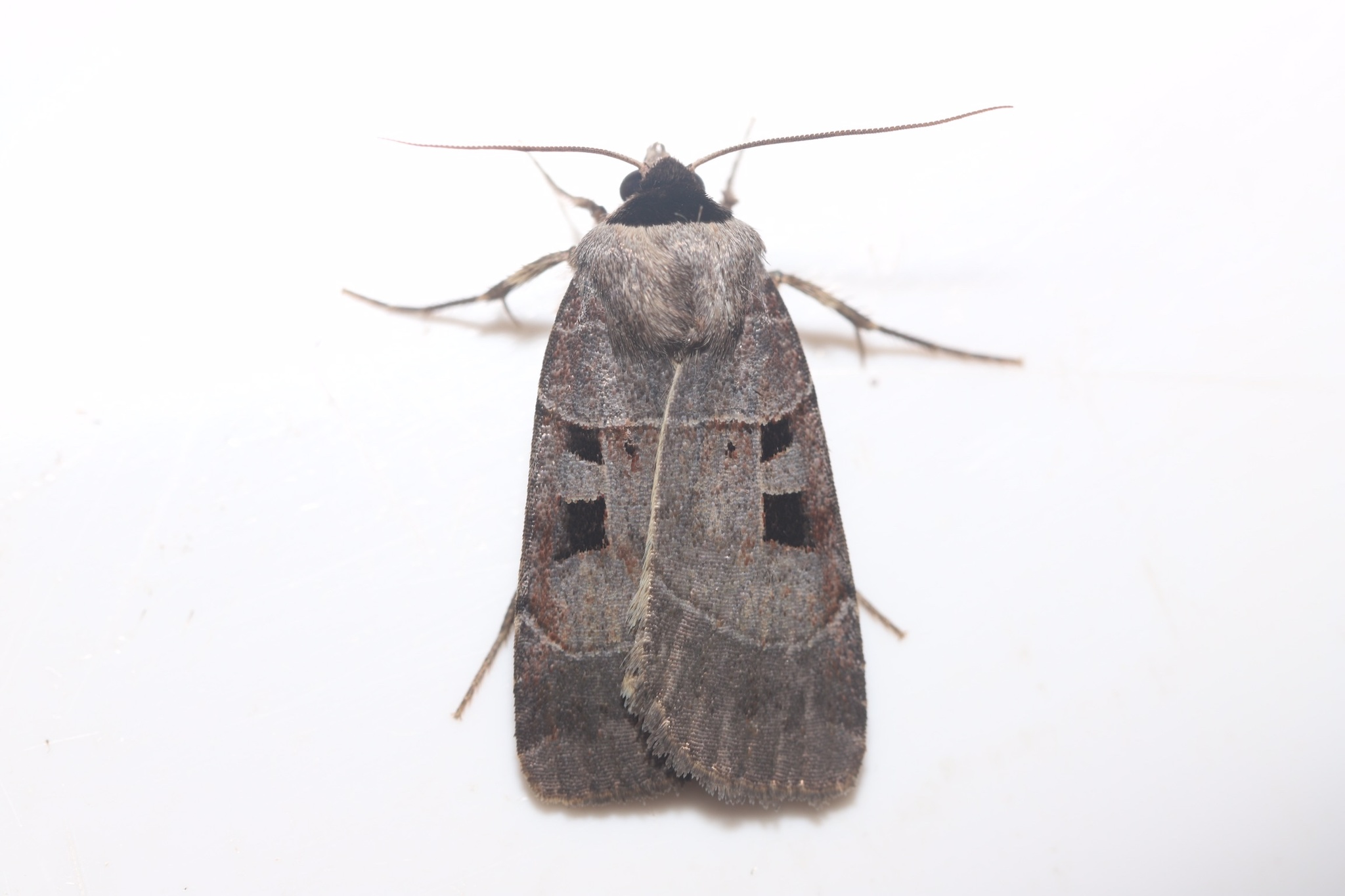

Scientific classification
- Domain: Eukaryota
- Kingdom: Animalia
- Phylum: Arthropoda
- Class: Insecta
- Order: Lepidoptera
- Superfamily: Noctuoidea
- Family: Noctuidae
- Genus: Agnorisma
- Species: A. bugrai

Binomial name
- Agnorisma bugrai (Koçak, 1983)

Synonyms
- Xestia collaris; Agrotis collaris

= Agnorisma bugrai =

Species of moth

Agnorisma bugrai, the collard dart, is a moth of the family Noctuidae. The species was first described by Ahmet Ömer Koçak in 1983. It has a transcontinental distribution in North America, from central Canada and the northern United States, southward in the Rocky Mountains to Colorado.

The wingspan is about 25 mm. Adults are on wing from August to September depending on the location.
