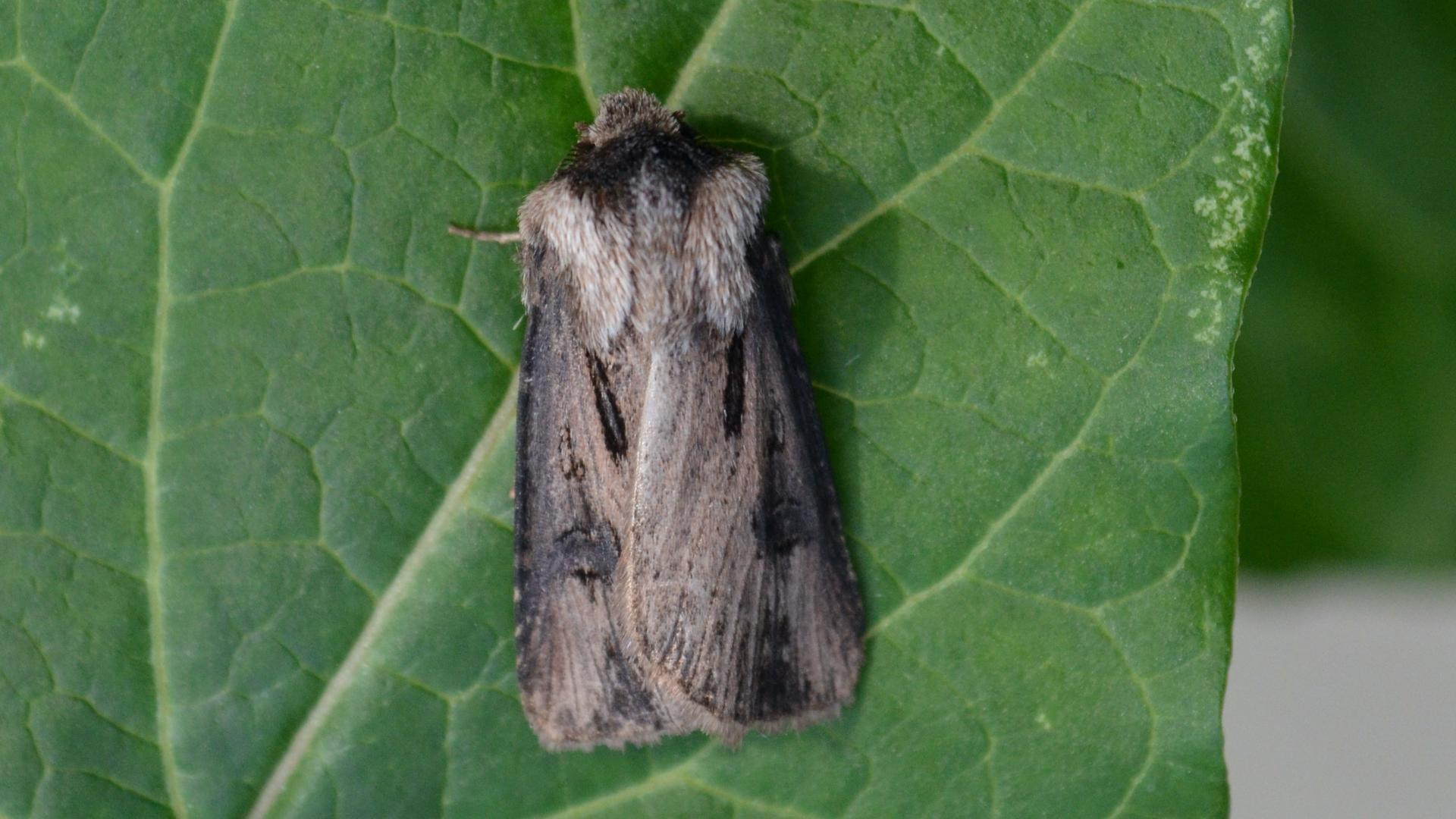

Scientific classification
- Kingdom: Animalia
- Phylum: Arthropoda
- Clade: Pancrustacea
- Class: Insecta
- Order: Lepidoptera
- Superfamily: Noctuoidea
- Family: Noctuidae
- Genus: Agrotis
- Species: A. venerabilis

Binomial name
- Agrotis venerabilis Walker, 1857

= Agrotis venerabilis =

Dusky cutworm

Species of moth

Agrotis venerabilis, the dusky cutworm, is a moth of the family Noctuidae. The species was first described by Francis Walker in 1857. It is found from coast to coast from central Canada south to Mexico.

The wingspan is about 37 mm. Adults are on wing from August to September in temperate climes within their range. They have a much wider season in the Neotropics, starting at least as early as March.

The larvae feed on Medicago sativa, Trifolium, Nicotiana tabacum, Viola, Stellaria media, Avena sativa and Zea mays.

== Subspecies ==
- Agrotis venerabilis venerabilis
- Agrotis venerabilis arida
