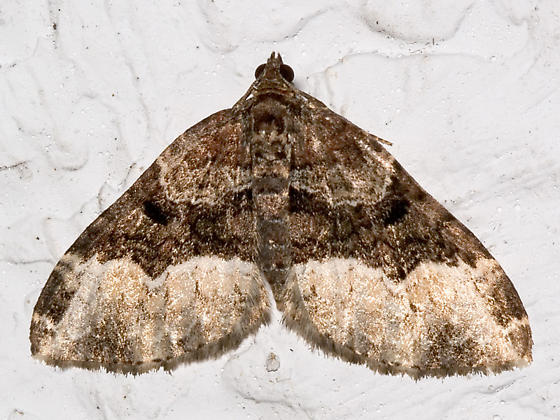

Scientific classification
- Kingdom: Animalia
- Phylum: Arthropoda
- Class: Insecta
- Order: Lepidoptera
- Family: Geometridae
- Genus: Euphyia
- Species: E. intermediata

Binomial name
- Euphyia intermediata (Guenée, 1858)

Synonyms
- Euphyia unangulata intermediata

= Euphyia intermediata =

Sharp-angled carpet

Species of moth

Euphyia intermediata, the sharp-angled carpet, is a moth of the family Geometridae. The species was first described by Achille Guenée in 1858. It is found from coast-to-coast in southern Canada and the northern United States, south in the east to North Carolina, south in the west to California, Utah, and possibly Arizona. It is also found north to the Northwest Territories and Alaska.

The European species Euphyia unangulata was previously thought to be Holarctic. The name was therefore also applied to the North American populations. Malcolm J. Scoble et al. in Geometrid Moths of the World (1999) split them into distinct species.

The wingspan is 21–27 mm. Adults are on wing from April to September. There is one generation per year.

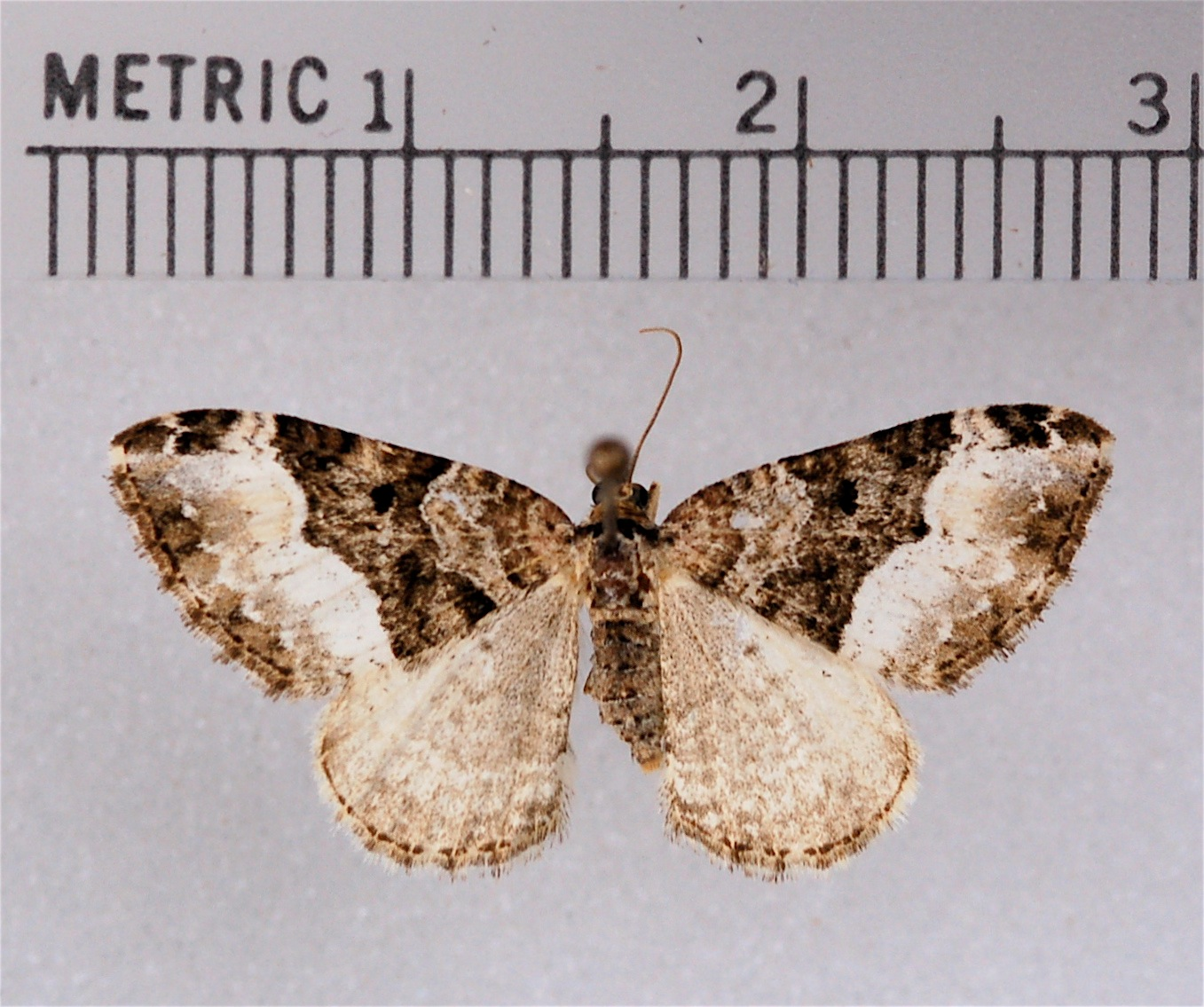

The larvae feed on various plants, including bedstraw, carnation, chickweed, elm, and mustard.
