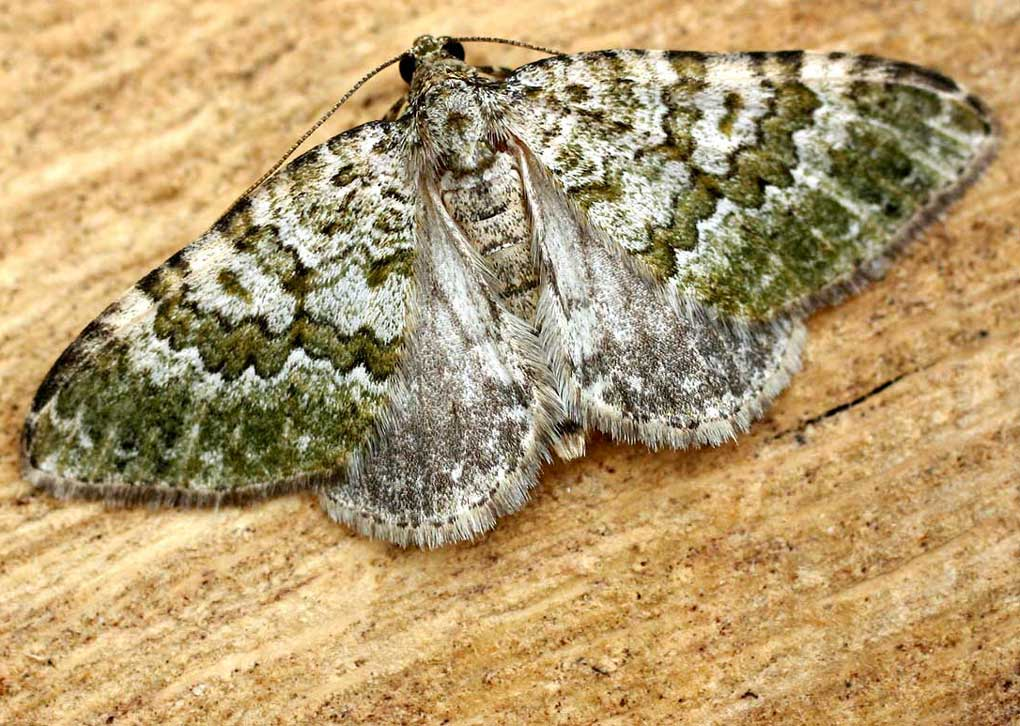

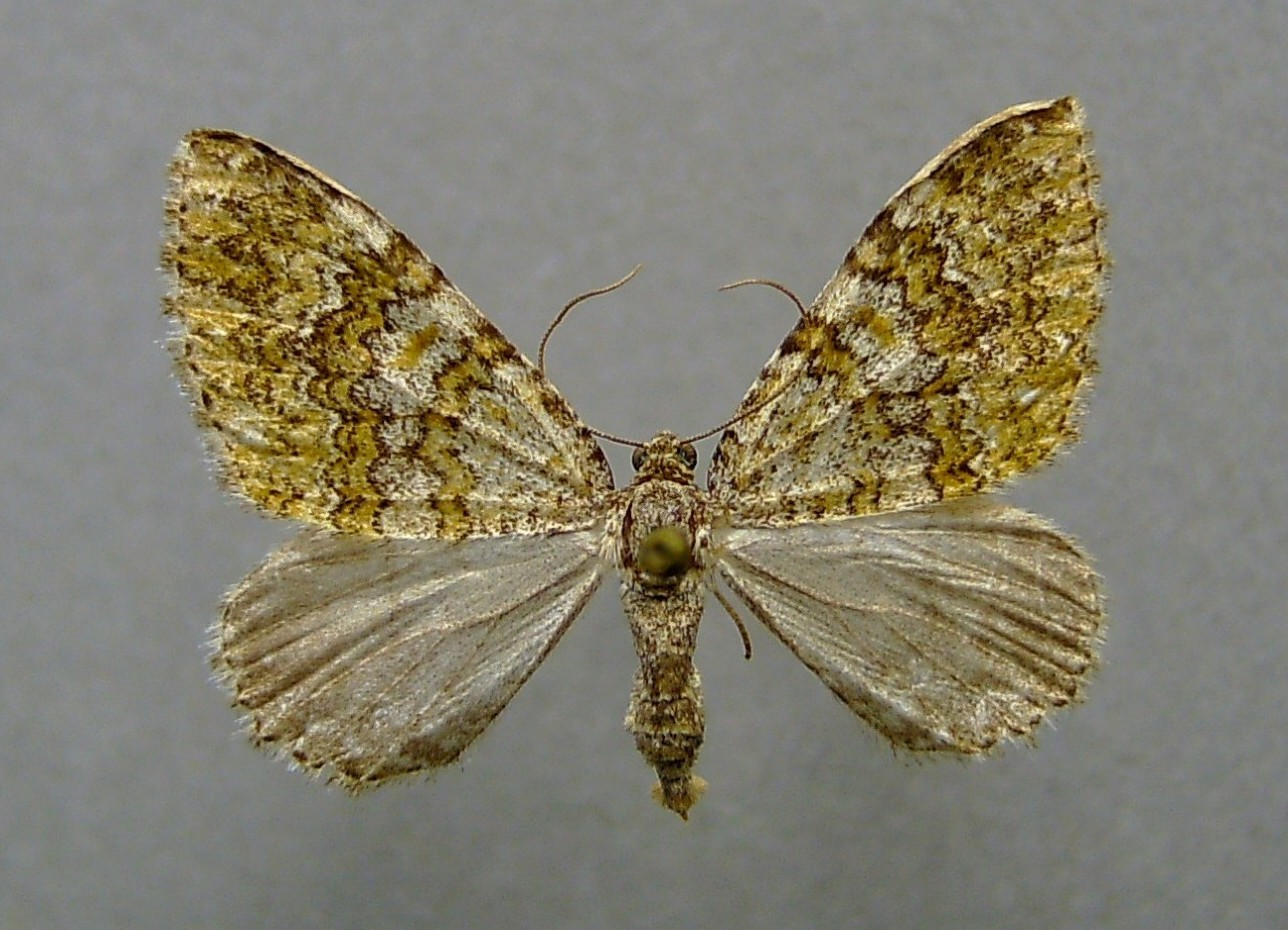

Scientific classification
- Domain: Eukaryota
- Kingdom: Animalia
- Phylum: Arthropoda
- Class: Insecta
- Order: Lepidoptera
- Family: Geometridae
- Genus: Euphyia
- Species: E. frustata

Binomial name
- Euphyia frustata (Treitschke, 1828)

= Euphyia frustata =

Species of moth

Euphyia frustata is a moth of the family Geometridae. The species can be found in Europe. The wingspan is about 28 to 34 mm.
