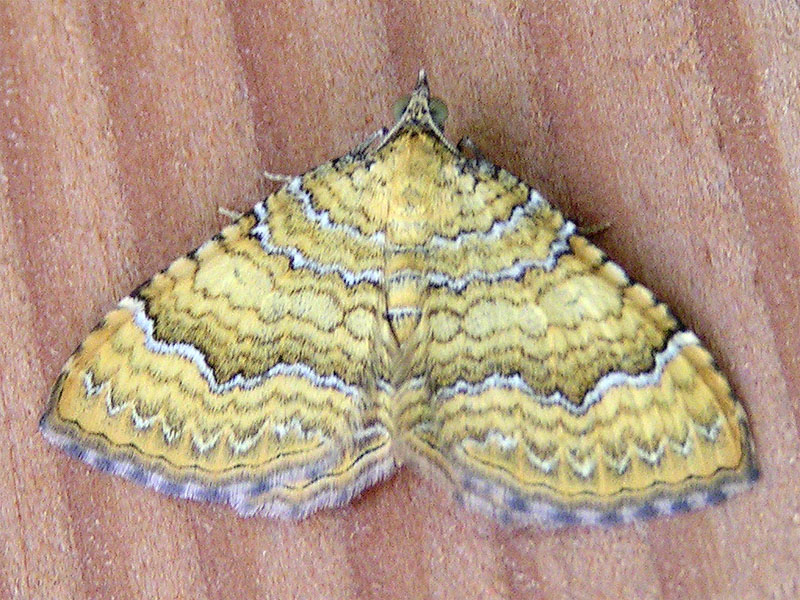
- Camptogramma bilineata

Scientific classification
- Domain: Eukaryota
- Kingdom: Animalia
- Phylum: Arthropoda
- Class: Insecta
- Order: Lepidoptera
- Family: Geometridae
- Tribe: Xanthorhoini
- Genus: Camptogramma; Stephens, 1831

= Camptogramma =

Genus of moths

Camptogramma is a genus of moths in the family Geometridae erected by James Francis Stephens in 1831. It is considered by some to be a synonym of Euphyia.

== Selected species ==
- Camptogramma bilineata (Linnaeus, 1758) – yellow shell
  - Camptogramma bilineata bilineata (Linnaeus, 1758)
  - Camptogramma bilineata bohatschi (Aigner, 1902)
- Camptogramma bistrigata (Treitschke, 1828)
- Camptogramma grisescens (Staudinger, 1892)
- Camptogramma scripturata (Hübner, 1799)
  - Camptogramma scripturata albidaria (Sohn-Rethel, 1929)
  - Camptogramma scripturata placidaria (Freyer, 1852)
  - Camptogramma scripturata poliata (Schawerda, 1913)
  - Camptogramma scripturata rilica (Prout, 1938)
  - Camptogramma scripturata scripturata (Hübner, 1799)
