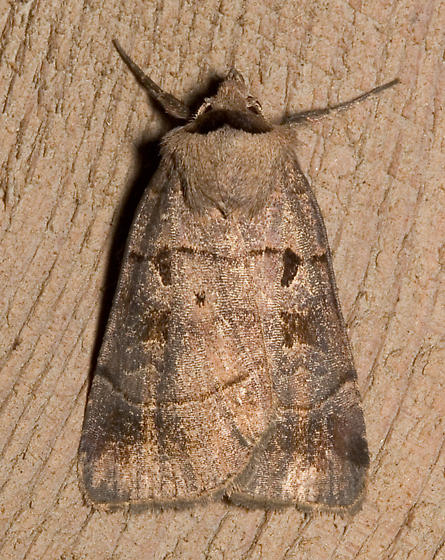
- Agnorisma badinodis

Scientific classification
- Domain: Eukaryota
- Kingdom: Animalia
- Phylum: Arthropoda
- Class: Insecta
- Order: Lepidoptera
- Superfamily: Noctuoidea
- Family: Noctuidae
- Subfamily: Noctuinae
- Genus: Agnorisma; Lafontaine, 1998

= Agnorisma =

Genus of moths

Agnorisma is a genus of moths of the family Noctuidae. Agnorisma species were formerly included in the genus Xestia.

== Species ==
- Agnorisma badinodis (formerly Xestia badinodis) – Pale-banded Dart Moth
- Agnorisma bollii (formerly Xestia bollii)
- Agnorisma bugrai (formerly Xestia collaris) – Collared Dart Moth
