= List of plants known as chickweed =

Chickweed is a common name most often applied to the plant species Stellaria media. Stellaria media is a common weed in North America and Europe and is an edible plant.

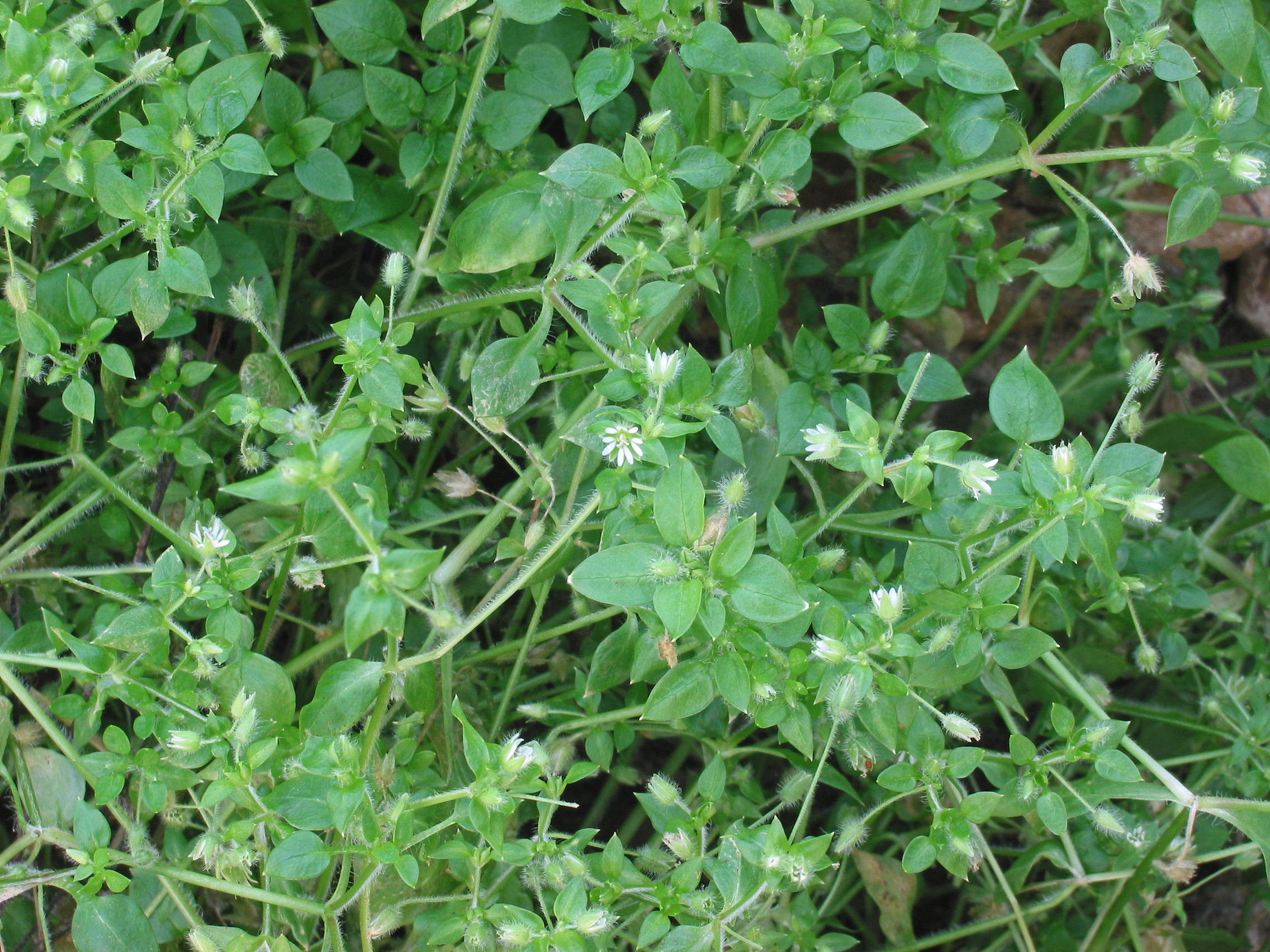
Mature Stellaria media plant

Chickweed is sometimes used as a common name for several other plants, many of which are relatives of Stellaria media in the family Caryophyllaceae:

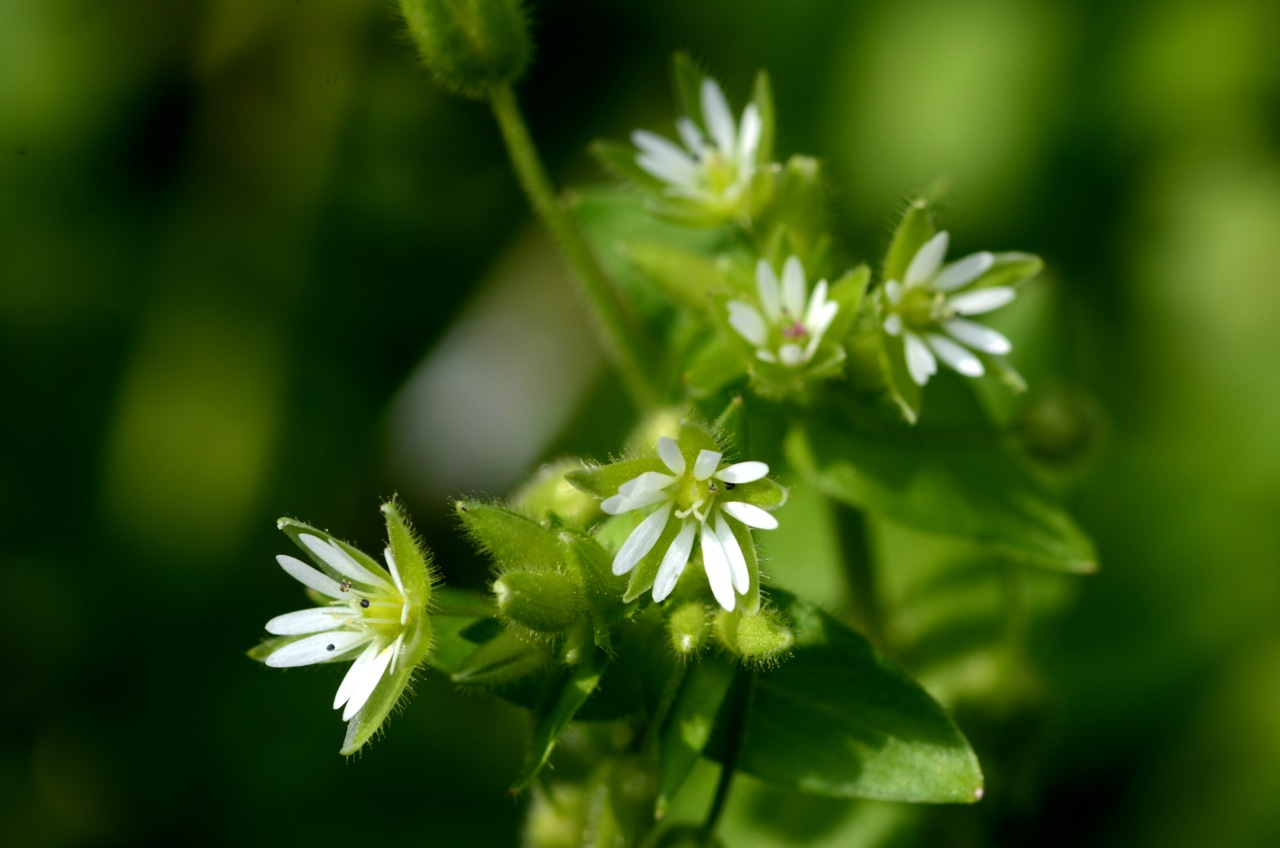
Closeup of Stellaria media flowers

- Ageratum conyzoides - Chickweed
- Cerastium - Mouse-ear chickweed
- Holosteum - Jagged chickweed
- Moenchia - Upright chickweed
- Paronychia - Chickweed
- Stellaria pro parte - Chickweed
- Stellaria media - Common chickweed
