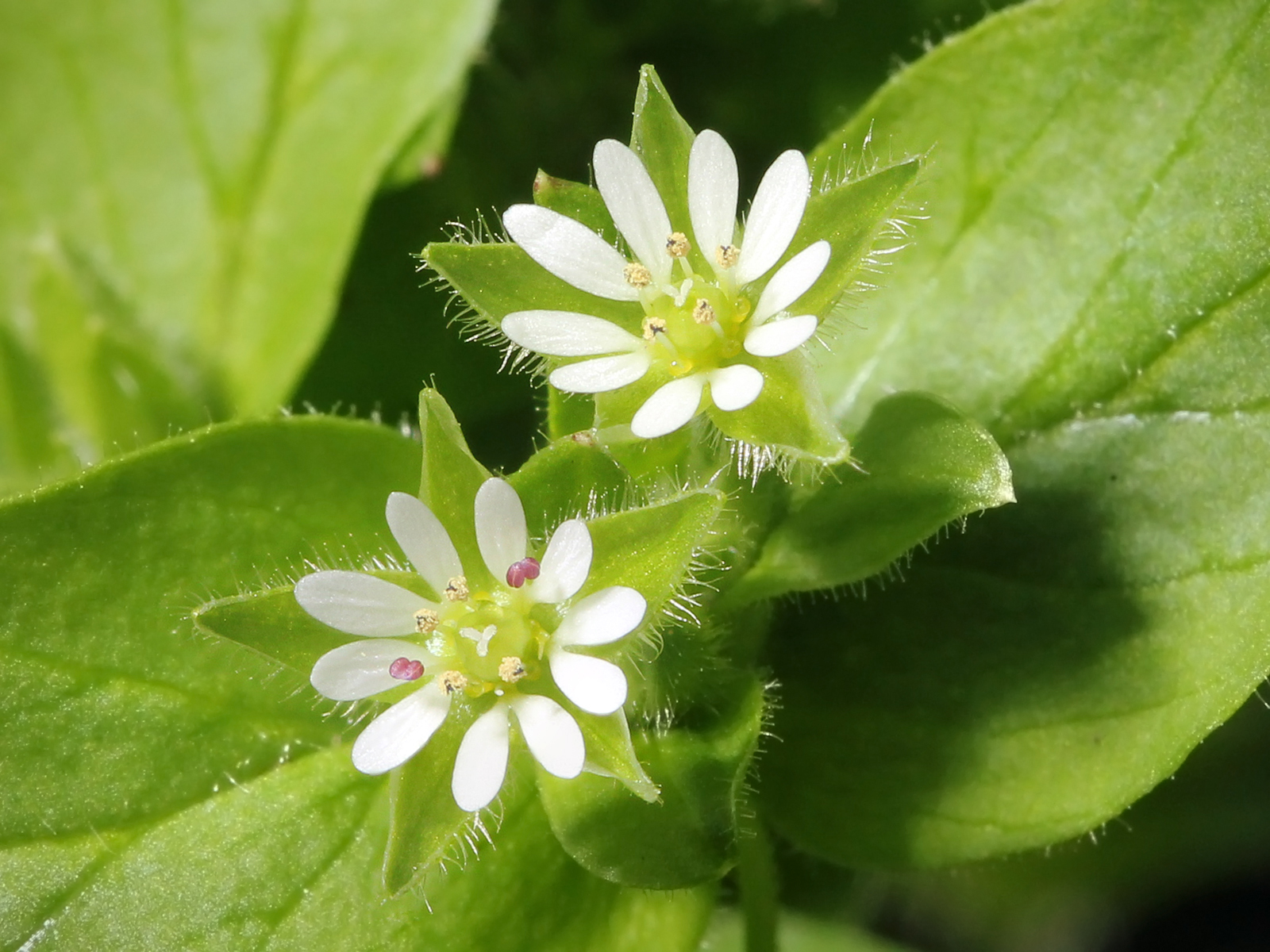

Scientific classification
- Kingdom: Plantae
- Clade: Embryophytes
- Clade: Tracheophytes
- Clade: Angiosperms
- Clade: Eudicots
- Order: Caryophyllales
- Family: Caryophyllaceae
- Genus: Stellaria
- Species: S. media

Binomial name
- Stellaria media (L.) Vill.

Synonyms
- Alsine media L.; Stellaria media subsp. typica Bég.; Stellularia media (L.) Kuntze

= Stellaria media =

Common chickweed

Species of flowering plant (chickweed)

Stellaria media, chickweed, is an annual flowering plant in the family Caryophyllaceae. It is native to Eurasia and naturalized throughout the world, where it is a weed of waste ground, farmland and gardens. It is sometimes grown as a salad crop or for poultry consumption.

== Description ==
Chickweed is a hardy annual which flowers throughout the year in northern Europe, in mild weather. The stems are terete and glabrous with a lax and sprawling growth habit, up to 40 cm (16 inches) long and 1 millimetre (1/16 in) in diameter, with a line (very occasionally 2 lines) of hairs running straight down its length, alternating sides at the nodes. The petioles are 5 to 8 mm long with hairy margins. The leaves are green, hairless, oval and opposite, 6 to 25 mm (1/4 to 1 in) long by 3 to 10 mm (1/8 to 3/8 in) wide with a hydathode at the tip.

The flowers are small, less than 1 cm in diameter, with 5 bifid white petals, 1–3 mm long, nestled inside the larger (3–5 mm long) sepals. These sepals have long, wavy (villous) hairs on their outer (distal) sides and are oval in shape, and usually 5 in number. There are often only 3 stamens but sometimes more (up to 8) and 3 styles. Many publications state that chickweed sometimes has no petals at all, but this may be due to confusion with lesser chickweed, which used to be considered a subspecies but is now considered to be a species in its own right.

The flowers quickly form capsules. Plants may have flowers and capsules at the same time.

=== Chemistry ===
The anthraquinones emodin, parietin (physcion) and questin, the flavonoid kaempferol-3,7-O-α-L-dirhamnoside, the phytosterols β-sitosterol and daucosterol, and the fatty alcohol 1-hexacosanol can be found in S. media. Other flavonoid constituents are apigenin 6-C-beta-D-galactopyranosyl-8-C-alpha-L-arabinopyranoside, apigenin 6-C-alpha-L-arabinopyranosyl-8-C-beta-D-galactopyranoside, apigenin 6-C-beta-D-galactopyranosyl-8-C-beta-L-arabinopyranoside, apigenin 6-C-beta-D-glucopyranosyl-8-C-beta-D-galactopyranoside, apigenin 6, 8-di-C-alpha-L-arabinopyranoside. The plant also contains triterpenoid saponins of the hydroxylated oleanolic acid type. Proanthocyanidins are present in the testa of seeds.

=== Similar species ===
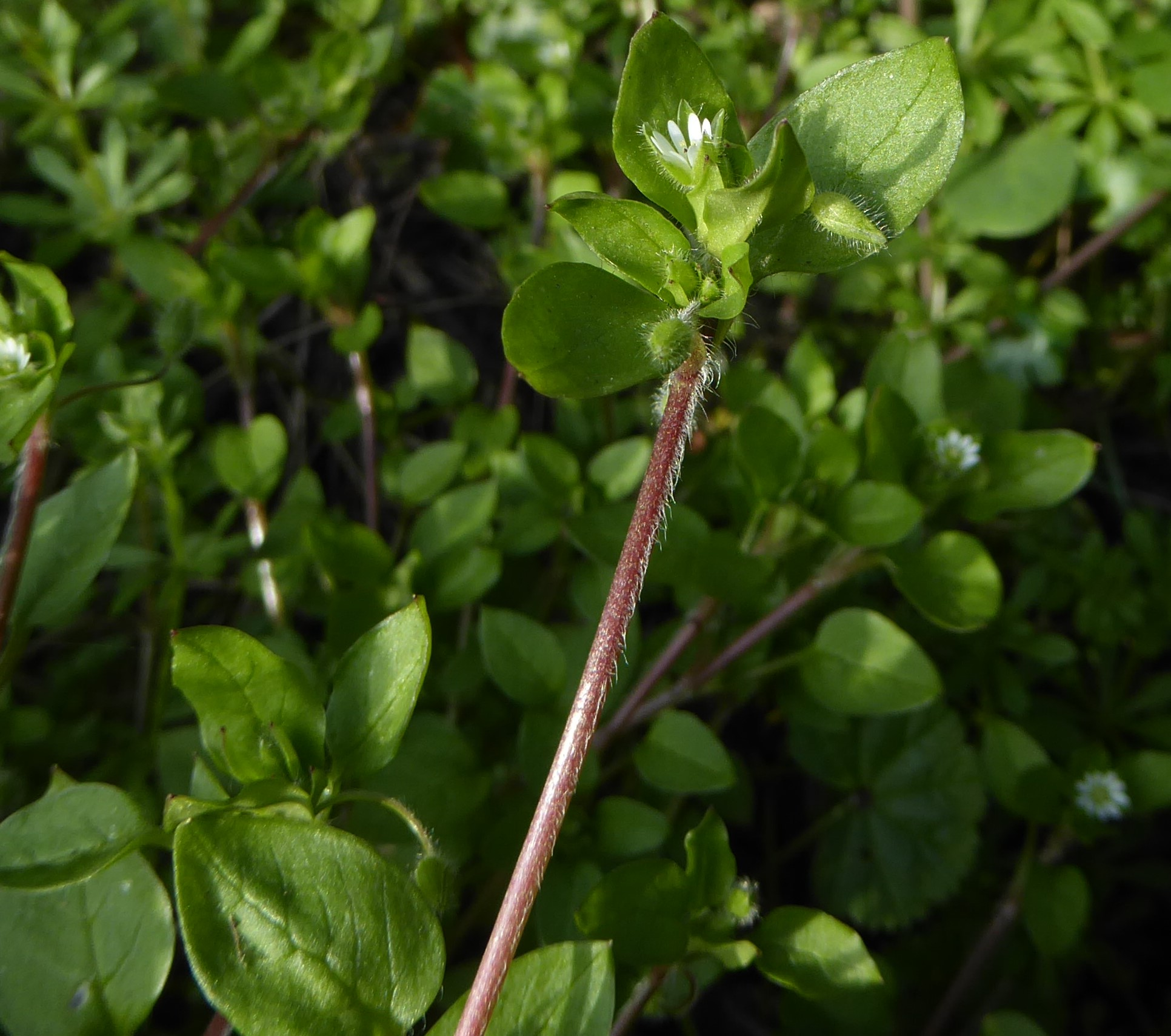
Chickweeds have a line of hairs along one side of stem.

Chickweeds are recognisable by the line of hairs down the stem. The species most likely to be confused with chickweeds are mouse-ears (Cerastium), however, mouse-ears are hairy all over (leaves and stems).

Common chickweed can be differentiated from lesser chickweed by the presence of white petals on the former and from greater chickweed by 3–8 stamens present compared to 8–10 found in greater chickweed. Water chickweed has petals longer than the sepals.

== Taxonomy ==
The name Stellaria media was published by Domínique Villars in Histoire des plantes du Dauphiné in 1789. It has accumulated a huge number of synonyms since then, as well as many putative varieties and subspecies, very few of which are accepted today.

The name Stellaria is derived from the word 'stella' meaning 'star', which is a reference to the shape of its flowers; media is Latin for 'between', 'intermediate', or 'mid-sized'.

It is sometimes called common chickweed to distinguish it from other plants called chickweed. Other common names include chickenwort, craches, maruns, and winterweed.

== Distribution and habitat ==
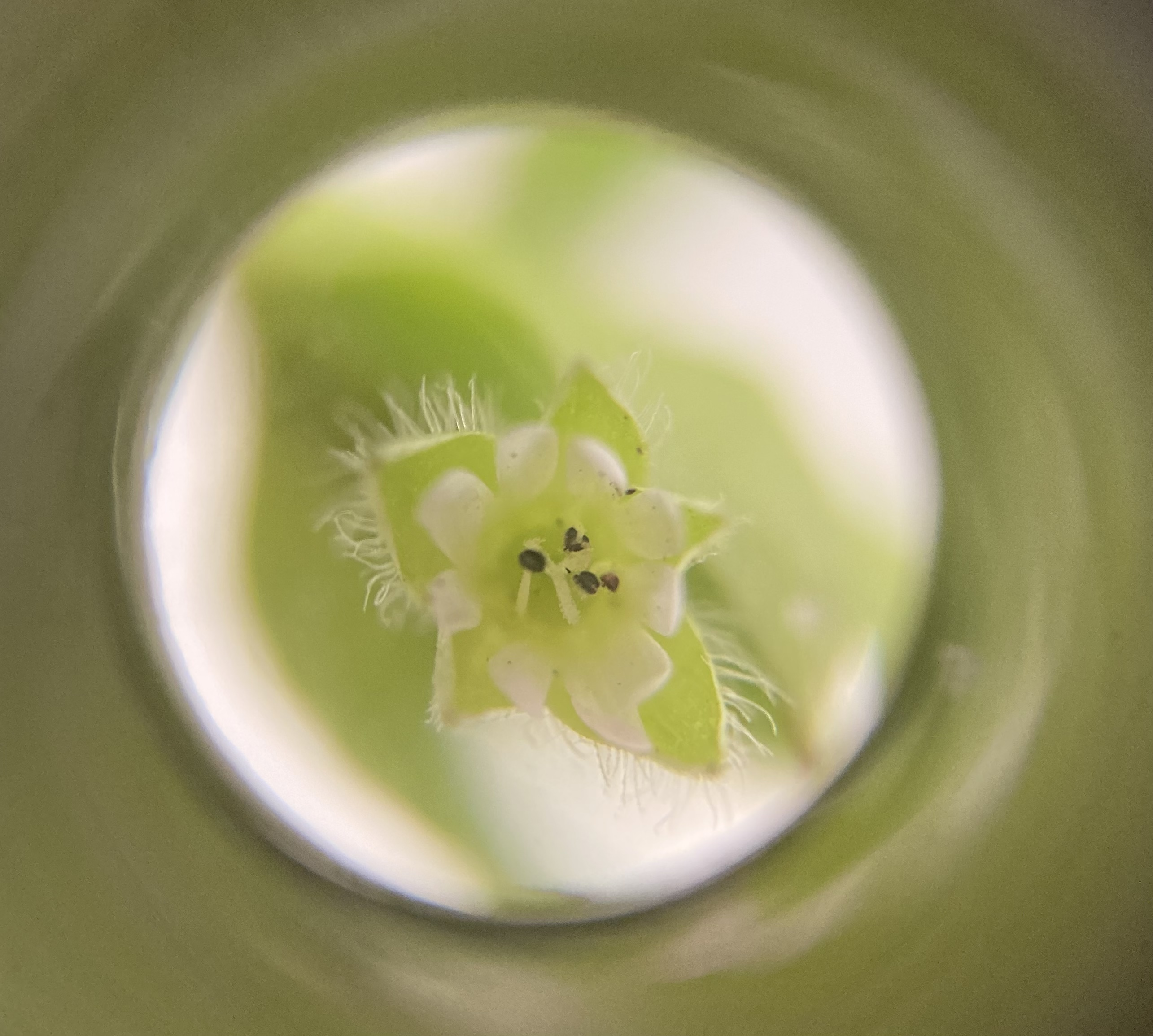
The sepals have very long hairs.

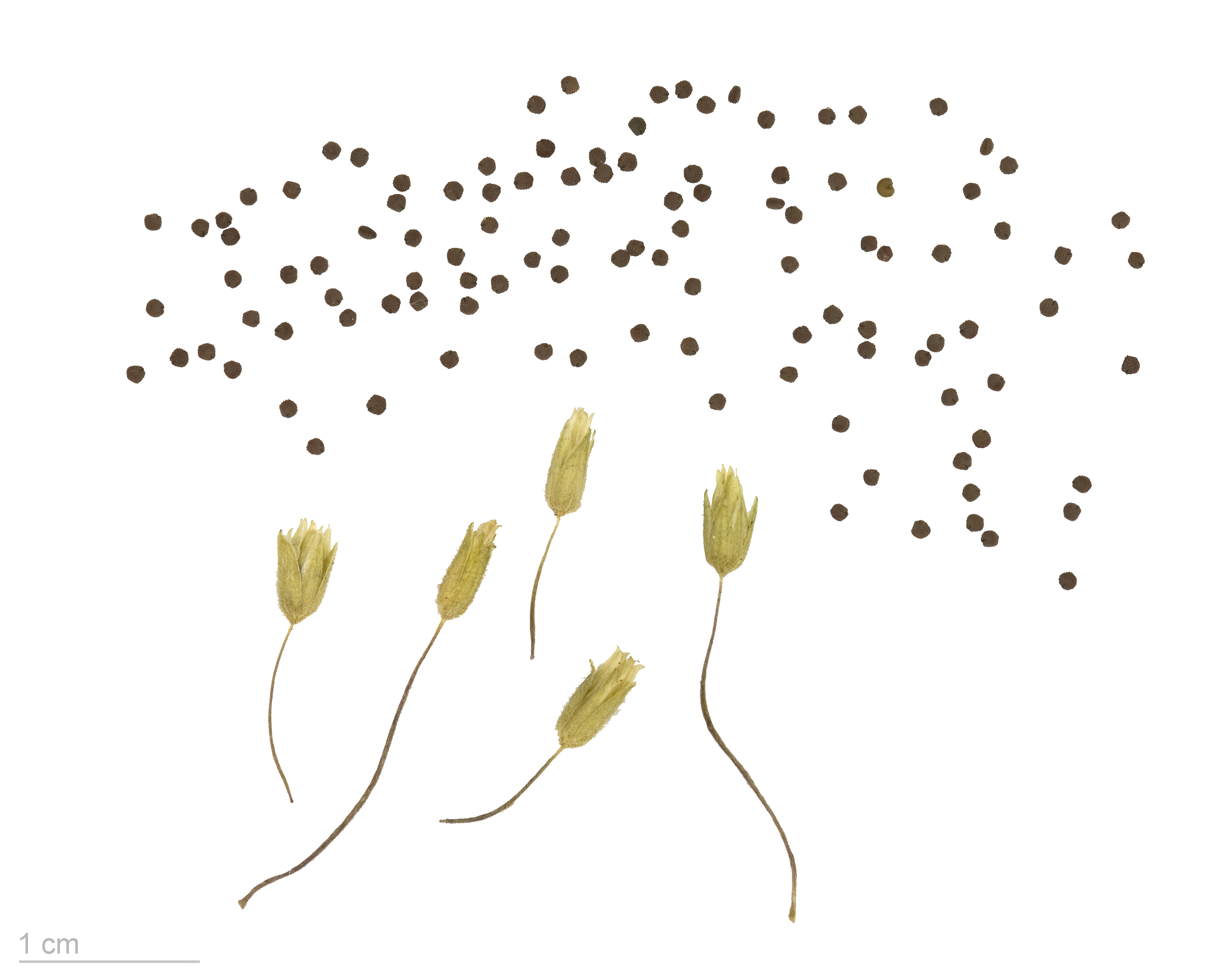
Seeds MHNT

Stellaria media is widespread in Asia, Europe, North America, and other parts of the world. There are several closely related plants referred to as chickweed, but which lack the culinary properties of plants in the genus Stellaria.

Stellaria media is common in lawns, meadows, waste places, and open areas. Its Ellenberg values in Britain are L = 7, F = 5, R = 6, N = 7, and S = 0.

== Ecology ==
The larvae of the following species of Lepidoptera feed on chickweed: chickweed geometer (Haematopis grataria), yellow shell (Camptogramma bilineata), pale-banded dart (Agnorisma badinodis), dusky cutworm (Agrotis venerabilis) and dainty sulphur (Nathalis iole). It is susceptible to downy mildew caused by the oomycete species Peronospora alsinearum.

It is eaten by chickens, wild birds, and mountain sheep.

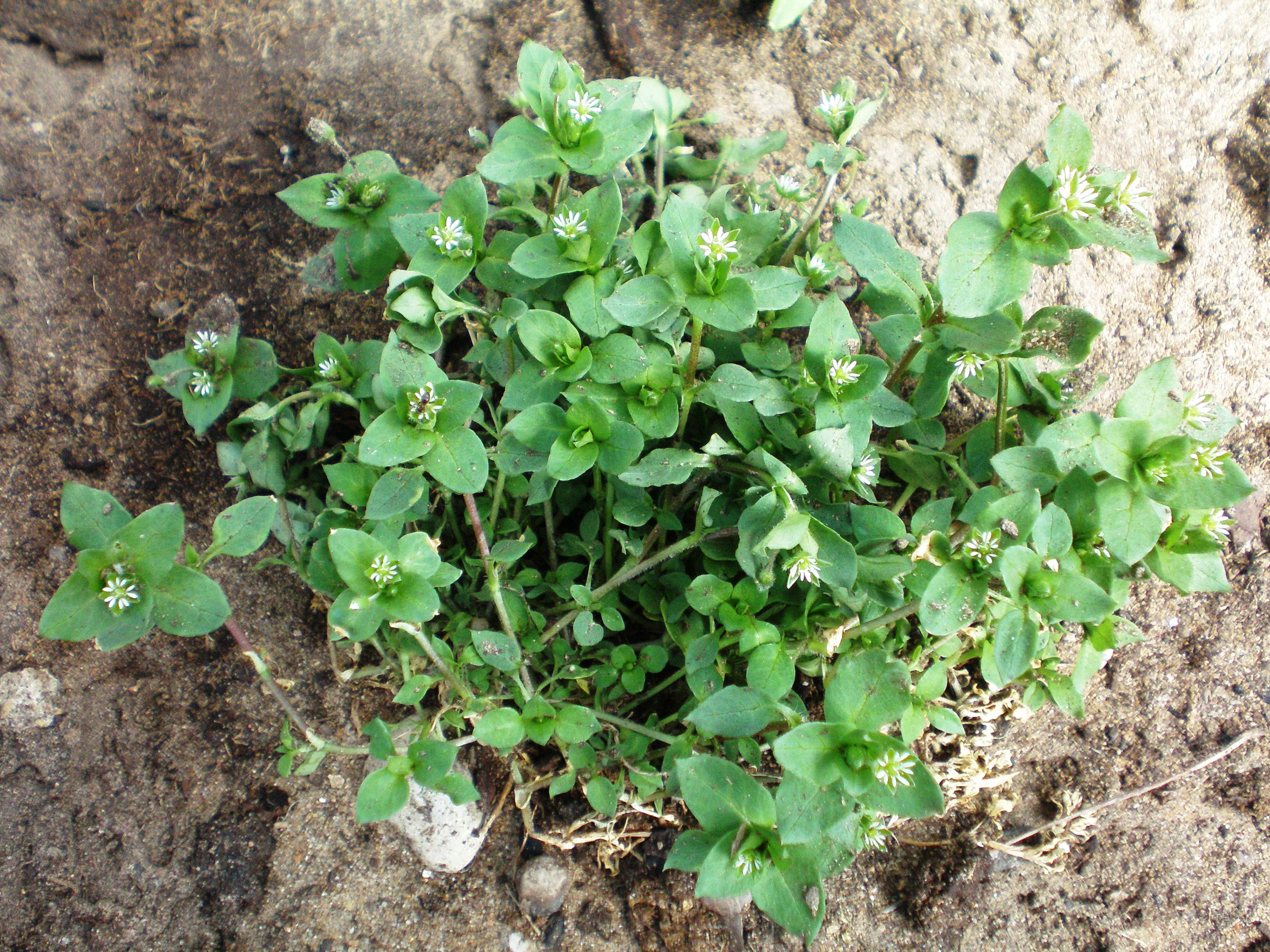

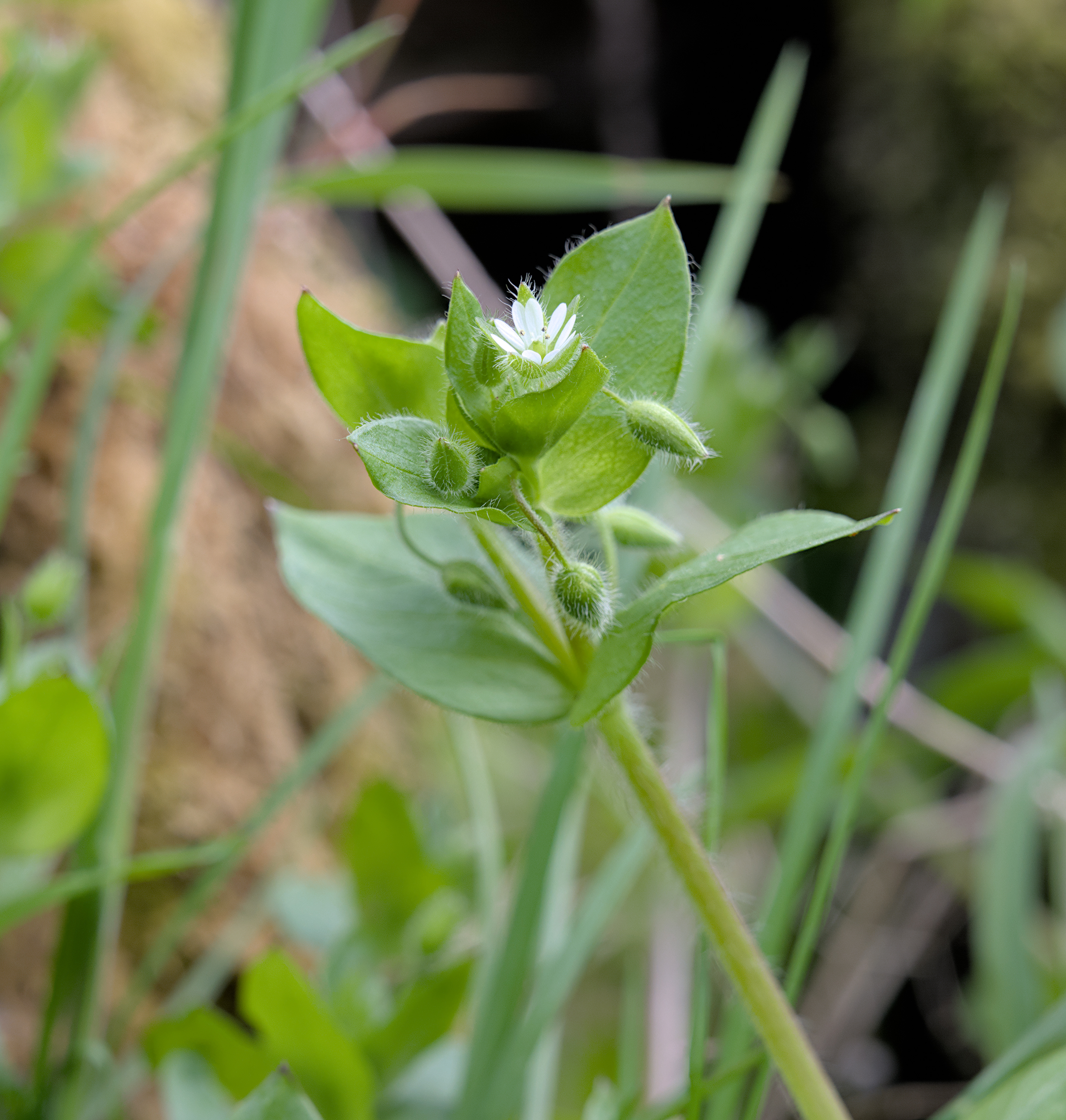

== Potential toxicity ==
Chickweed contains plant chemicals known as saponins, which can be toxic to some species (notably fish). It is unlikely that most land animals will be affected, as the quantities involved are not large. However, it is not advised during pregnancy or while breastfeeding.

== Uses ==
Stellaria media is edible and nutritious, and is used as a leaf vegetable, often raw in salads. It is one of the ingredients of the symbolic dish consumed in the Japanese springtime festival, Nanakusa-no-sekku. Some varieties or similar species may be too fibrous to eat.

It is said to have medicinal properties and is used in folk medicine. It has been used as a remedy to treat itchy skin conditions and pulmonary diseases. 17th-century herbalist John Gerard recommended it as a remedy for mange. Modern herbalists prescribe it for iron-deficiency anemia (for its high iron content), as well as for skin diseases, bronchitis, rheumatic pains, arthritis, and period pain. Not all of these uses are supported by scientific evidence. The plant was used by the Ainu for treating bruises and aching bones. Stems were steeped in hot water before being applied externally to affected areas.
