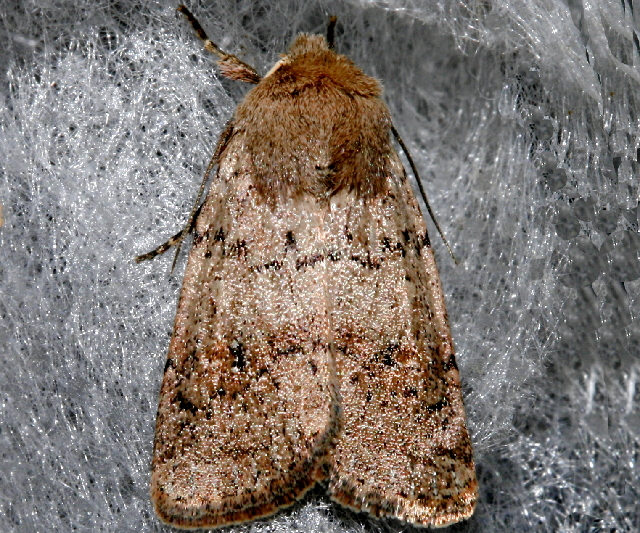

Scientific classification
- Domain: Eukaryota
- Kingdom: Animalia
- Phylum: Arthropoda
- Class: Insecta
- Order: Lepidoptera
- Superfamily: Noctuoidea
- Family: Noctuidae
- Tribe: Eriopygini
- Genus: Homorthodes
- Species: H. fractura

Binomial name
- Homorthodes fractura (Smith, 1906)

= Homorthodes fractura =

Species of moth

Homorthodes fractura is a species of cutworm or dart moth in the family Noctuidae. It is found in North America.

The MONA or Hodges number for Homorthodes fractura is 10534.

== Subspecies ==
These two subspecies belong to the species Homorthodes fractura:

- Homorthodes fractura fractura
- Homorthodes fractura mecrona Smith, 1908
