= Lacinipolia consimilis =

Scientific classification
- Kingdom: Animalia
- Phylum: Arthropoda
- Clade: Pancrustacea
- Class: Insecta
- Order: Lepidoptera
- Superfamily: Noctuoidea
- Family: Noctuidae
- Tribe: Eriopygini
- Genus: Lacinipolia
- Species: L. consimilis

Binomial name
- Lacinipolia consimilis McDunnough, 1937

Species of moth

Lacinipolia consimilis is a species of cutworm or dart moth in the family Noctuidae. It is found in North America.

The MONA or Hodges number for Lacinipolia consimilis is 10420.
