= Homorthodes reliqua =

Scientific classification
- Domain: Eukaryota
- Kingdom: Animalia
- Phylum: Arthropoda
- Class: Insecta
- Order: Lepidoptera
- Superfamily: Noctuoidea
- Family: Noctuidae
- Tribe: Eriopygini
- Genus: Homorthodes
- Species: H. reliqua

Binomial name
- Homorthodes reliqua (Smith, 1899)

Species of moth

Homorthodes reliqua is a species of cutworm or dart moth in the family Noctuidae. It is found in North America.

The MONA or Hodges number for Homorthodes reliqua is 10541.
