= Marilopteryx lutina =

Scientific classification
- Kingdom: Animalia
- Phylum: Arthropoda
- Class: Insecta
- Order: Lepidoptera
- Superfamily: Noctuoidea
- Family: Noctuidae
- Tribe: Eriopygini
- Genus: Marilopteryx
- Species: M. lutina

Binomial name
- Marilopteryx lutina (Smith, 1902)

Species of moth

Marilopteryx lutina is a species of cutworm or dart moth in the family Noctuidae. It is found in North America.

The MONA or Hodges number for Marilopteryx lutina is 10633.
