= Hydroeciodes auripurpura =

Scientific classification
- Domain: Eukaryota
- Kingdom: Animalia
- Phylum: Arthropoda
- Class: Insecta
- Order: Lepidoptera
- Superfamily: Noctuoidea
- Family: Noctuidae
- Tribe: Eriopygini
- Genus: Hydroeciodes
- Species: H. auripurpura

Binomial name
- Hydroeciodes auripurpura (A. Blanchard, 1968)

Synonyms
- Hydroecia auripurpuraA. Blanchard, 1968

Species of moth

Hydroeciodes auripurpura is a species of cutworm or dart moth in the family Noctuidae. It is endemic to Texas. The MONA or Hodges number for Hydroeciodes auripurpura is 10639.

The wingspan is 28–32 mm (1.1–1.3 in).
