= Miodera stigmata =

Scientific classification
- Kingdom: Animalia
- Phylum: Arthropoda
- Clade: Pancrustacea
- Class: Insecta
- Order: Lepidoptera
- Superfamily: Noctuoidea
- Family: Noctuidae
- Tribe: Eriopygini
- Genus: Miodera
- Species: M. stigmata

Binomial name
- Miodera stigmata Smith, 1908

Species of moth

Miodera stigmata is a species of cutworm or dart moth in the family Noctuidae. It is found in North America.
