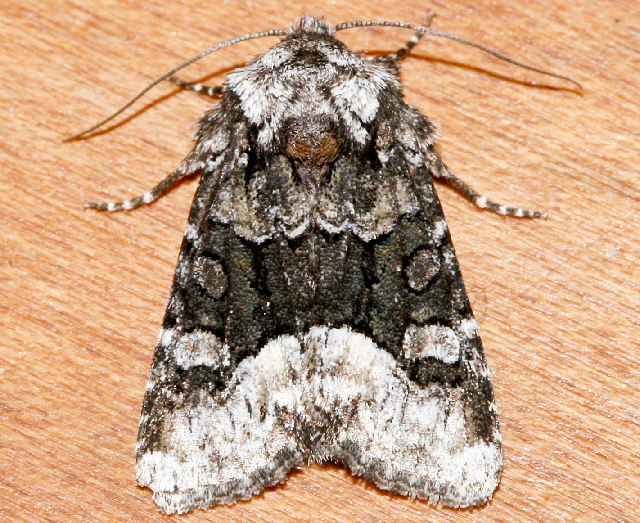

Scientific classification
- Kingdom: Animalia
- Phylum: Arthropoda
- Clade: Pancrustacea
- Class: Insecta
- Order: Lepidoptera
- Superfamily: Noctuoidea
- Family: Noctuidae
- Tribe: Eriopygini
- Genus: Lacinipolia
- Species: L. davena

Binomial name
- Lacinipolia davena (Smith, 1901)

= Lacinipolia davena =

Species of moth

Lacinipolia davena, the red-spot polia, is a species of cutworm or dart moth in the family Noctuidae. It is found in North America.

The MONA or Hodges number for Lacinipolia davena is 10407.
