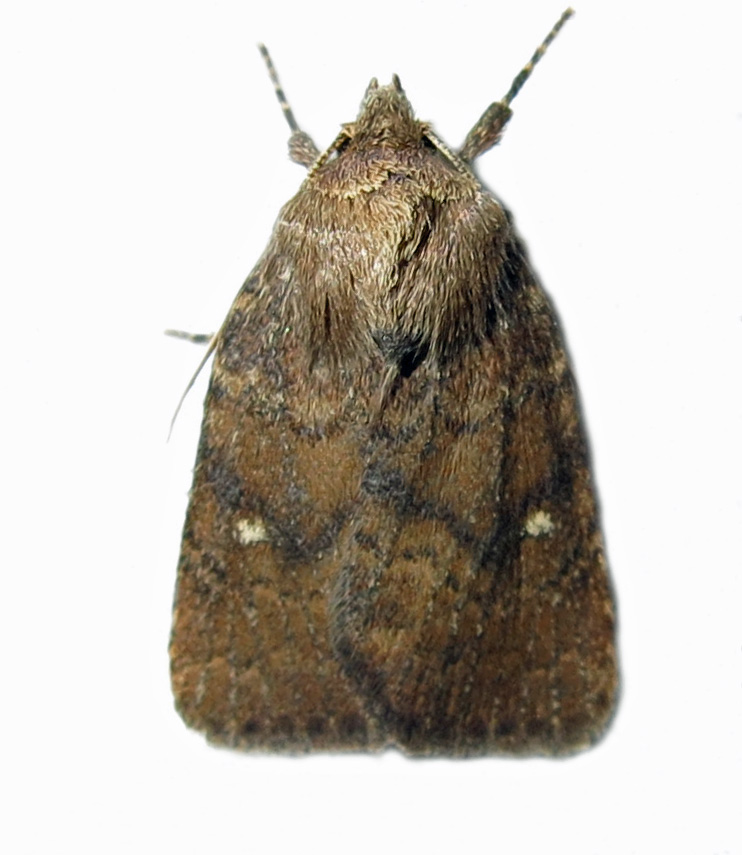

Scientific classification
- Kingdom: Animalia
- Phylum: Arthropoda
- Class: Insecta
- Order: Lepidoptera
- Superfamily: Noctuoidea
- Family: Noctuidae
- Tribe: Eriopygini
- Genus: Pseudorthodes
- Species: P. vecors

Binomial name
- Pseudorthodes vecors (Guenée, 1852)

Synonyms
- Pseudorthodes calceolaris (Strecker, 1900); Pseudorthodes imora (Strecker, 1898)

= Pseudorthodes vecors =

Species of moth

Pseudorthodes vecors, the small brown Quaker, is a species of cutworm or dart moth in the family Noctuidae. It is found in North America.

The MONA or Hodges number for Pseudorthodes vecors is 10578.
