= Hydroeciodes repleta =

Scientific classification
- Domain: Eukaryota
- Kingdom: Animalia
- Phylum: Arthropoda
- Class: Insecta
- Order: Lepidoptera
- Superfamily: Noctuoidea
- Family: Noctuidae
- Tribe: Eriopygini
- Genus: Hydroeciodes
- Species: H. repleta

Binomial name
- Hydroeciodes repleta (Bird, 1911)

Species of moth

Hydroeciodes repleta is a species of cutworm or dart moth in the family Noctuidae. It is found in North America.

The MONA or Hodges number for Hydroeciodes repleta is 10636.
