= Engelhardtia =

Engelhardtia may refer to:

- Engelhardtia, a misspelling of Engelhardia, a genus of plants in the family Juglandaceae
- Engelhardtia (moth), a genus of insects in the family Noctuidae
