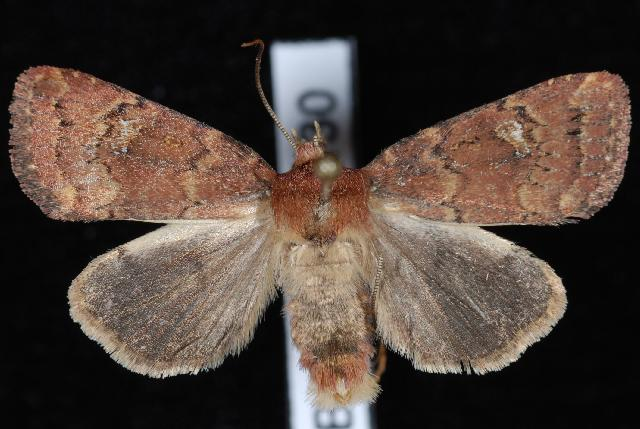

Scientific classification
- Kingdom: Animalia
- Phylum: Arthropoda
- Clade: Pancrustacea
- Class: Insecta
- Order: Lepidoptera
- Superfamily: Noctuoidea
- Family: Noctuidae
- Tribe: Eriopygini
- Genus: Pseudorthodes
- Species: P. irrorata

Binomial name
- Pseudorthodes irrorata (Smith, 1888)

= Pseudorthodes irrorata =

Species of moth

Pseudorthodes irrorata is a species of cutworm or dart moth in the family Noctuidae. It is found in North America.
