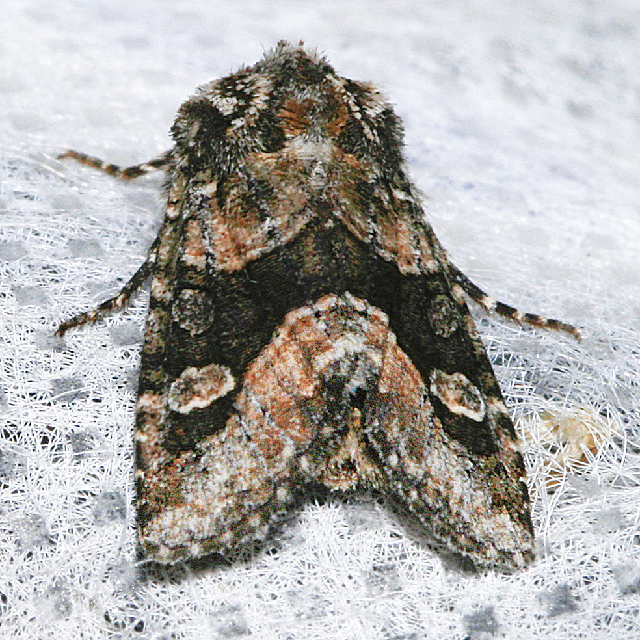

Scientific classification
- Kingdom: Animalia
- Phylum: Arthropoda
- Clade: Pancrustacea
- Class: Insecta
- Order: Lepidoptera
- Superfamily: Noctuoidea
- Family: Noctuidae
- Tribe: Eriopygini
- Genus: Lacinipolia
- Species: L. olivacea

Binomial name
- Lacinipolia olivacea (Morrison, 1874)

= Lacinipolia olivacea =

Species of moth

Lacinipolia olivacea, the olive arches, is a species of cutworm or dart moth in the family Noctuidae. It is found in North America.
