= Anhimella contrahens =

Scientific classification
- Kingdom: Animalia
- Phylum: Arthropoda
- Class: Insecta
- Order: Lepidoptera
- Superfamily: Noctuoidea
- Family: Noctuidae
- Tribe: Eriopygini
- Genus: Anhimella
- Species: A. contrahens

Binomial name
- Anhimella contrahens (Walker, 1860)

Species of moth

Anhimella contrahens is a species of cutworm or dart moth in the family Noctuidae. It is found in North America.

The MONA or Hodges number for Anhimella contrahens is 10530.

== Subspecies ==
These two subspecies belong to the species Anhimella contrahens:

- Anhimella contrahens conar Strecker, 1898
- Anhimella contrahens contrahens
