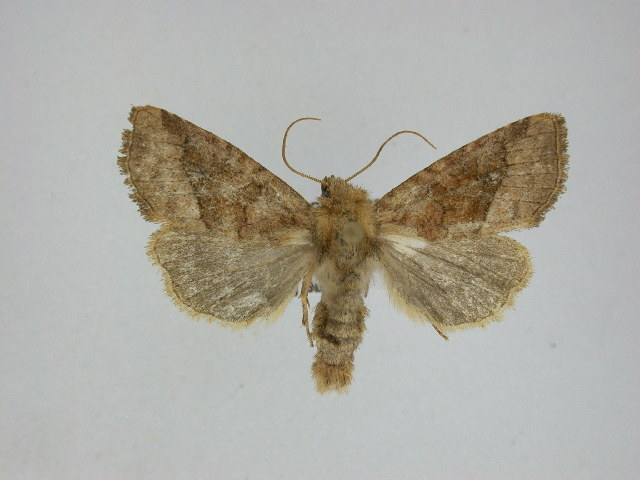

Scientific classification
- Kingdom: Animalia
- Phylum: Arthropoda
- Clade: Pancrustacea
- Class: Insecta
- Order: Lepidoptera
- Superfamily: Noctuoidea
- Family: Noctuidae
- Tribe: Eriopygini
- Genus: Lacinipolia
- Species: L. lorea

Binomial name
- Lacinipolia lorea (Guenée, 1852)

= Lacinipolia lorea =

Bridled arches

Species of moth

Lacinipolia lorea, the bridled arches, is a species of cutworm or dart moth in the family Noctuidae. It is found in North America.
