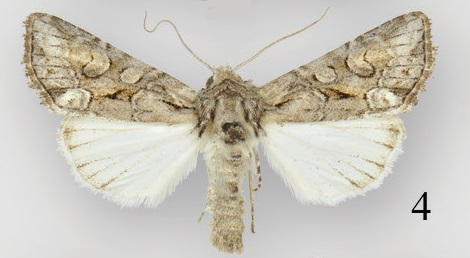
- Male
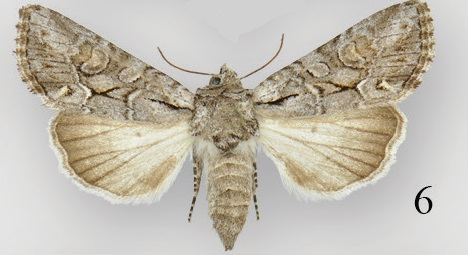
- Female

Scientific classification
- Kingdom: Animalia
- Phylum: Arthropoda
- Clade: Pancrustacea
- Class: Insecta
- Order: Lepidoptera
- Superfamily: Noctuoidea
- Family: Noctuidae
- Genus: Lacinipolia
- Species: L. teligera

Binomial name
- Lacinipolia teligera (Morrison, 1875)

Synonyms
- Mamestra teligera Morrison, 1875

= Lacinipolia teligera =

Species of moth

Lacinipolia teligera is a moth in the family Noctuidae. It is found from the Great Plains of central Colorado and eastern Kansas southward to central Texas.

Adults are similar to Lacinipolia sareta, but are slightly larger with a broader forewing and better-defined, crisper forewing maculation. However, reliable identification should be based on the genitalic structure.
