= Lacinipolia marinitincta =

Scientific classification
- Kingdom: Animalia
- Phylum: Arthropoda
- Clade: Pancrustacea
- Class: Insecta
- Order: Lepidoptera
- Superfamily: Noctuoidea
- Family: Noctuidae
- Tribe: Eriopygini
- Genus: Lacinipolia
- Species: L. marinitincta

Binomial name
- Lacinipolia marinitincta (Harvey, 1875)

Species of moth

Lacinipolia marinitincta is a species of cutworm or dart moth in the family Noctuidae. It is found in North America.

The MONA or Hodges number for Lacinipolia marinitincta is 10412.
