= Carancahua =

Carancahua may refer to:

- Carancahua Bay, a body of water in Texas
- Karankawa people, a native Texan tribe
- Marilopteryx carancahua, a species of cutworm
