= Homorthodes mania =

Scientific classification
- Kingdom: Animalia
- Phylum: Arthropoda
- Clade: Pancrustacea
- Class: Insecta
- Order: Lepidoptera
- Superfamily: Noctuoidea
- Family: Noctuidae
- Tribe: Eriopygini
- Genus: Homorthodes
- Species: H. mania

Binomial name
- Homorthodes mania (Strecker, 1899)

Species of moth

Homorthodes mania is a species of cutworm or dart moth in the family Noctuidae. It is found in North America.
