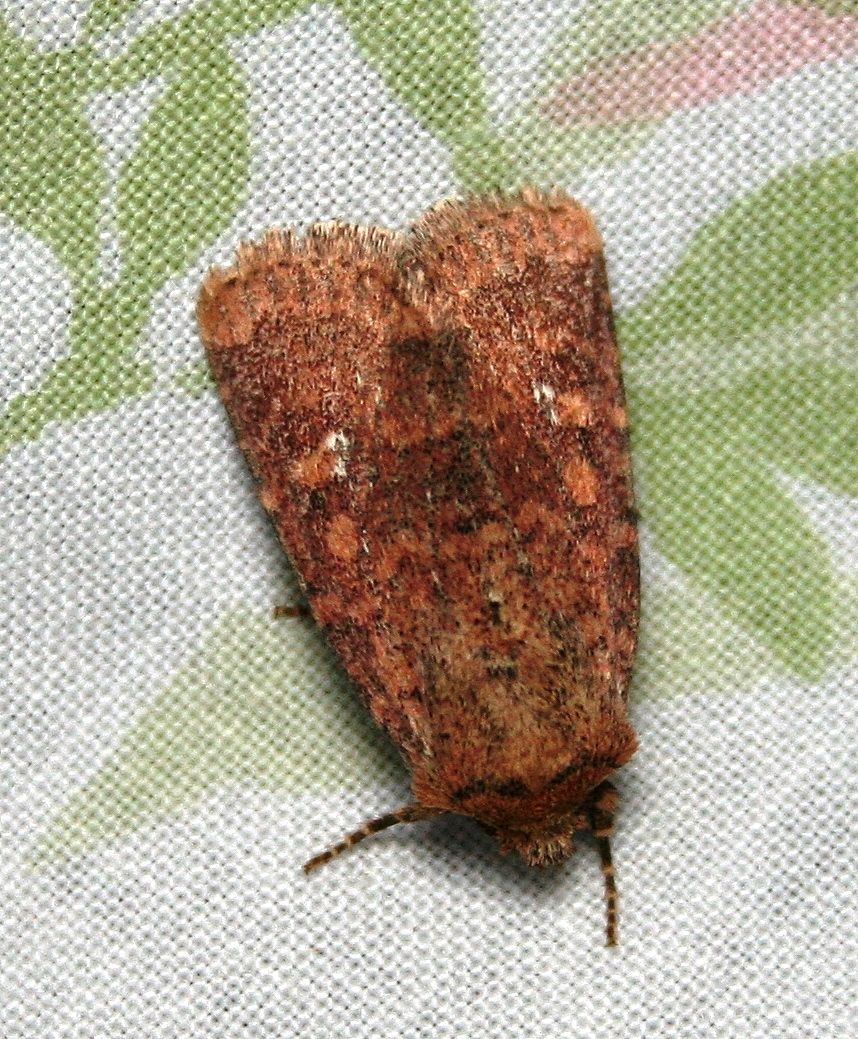

Scientific classification
- Domain: Eukaryota
- Kingdom: Animalia
- Phylum: Arthropoda
- Class: Insecta
- Order: Lepidoptera
- Superfamily: Noctuoidea
- Family: Noctuidae
- Genus: Homorthodes
- Species: H. lindseyi

Binomial name
- Homorthodes lindseyi Benjamin, 1922

Synonyms
- Homorthodes furfurata lindseyi

= Homorthodes lindseyi =

Species of moth

The southern scurfy Quaker moth (Homorthodes lindseyi) is a moth of the family Noctuidae. It was formerly classified as a subspecies of Homorthodes furfurata (Homorthodes furfurata lindseyi). It is found in North America, from New Jersey, as far south east as Oklahoma.

The wingspan is about 27 mm. The moth flies from April to June depending on the location.

The larvae feed on a wide range of plants.
