= Lacinipolia sharonae =

Scientific classification
- Kingdom: Animalia
- Phylum: Arthropoda
- Clade: Pancrustacea
- Class: Insecta
- Order: Lepidoptera
- Superfamily: Noctuoidea
- Family: Noctuidae
- Tribe: Eriopygini
- Genus: Lacinipolia
- Species: L. sharonae

Binomial name
- Lacinipolia sharonae Selman & Leuschner, 2001

Species of moth

Lacinipolia sharonae is a species of cutworm or dart moth in the family Noctuidae. It is found in North America.

The MONA or Hodges number for Lacinipolia sharonae is 10406.3.
