= Pseudorthodes iole =

Scientific classification
- Domain: Eukaryota
- Kingdom: Animalia
- Phylum: Arthropoda
- Class: Insecta
- Order: Lepidoptera
- Superfamily: Noctuoidea
- Family: Noctuidae
- Genus: Pseudorthodes
- Species: P. iole

Binomial name
- Pseudorthodes iole (Schaus, 1894)

Species of moth

Pseudorthodes iole is a species of cutworm or dart moth in the family Noctuidae.

The MONA or Hodges number for Pseudorthodes iole is 10605.1.
