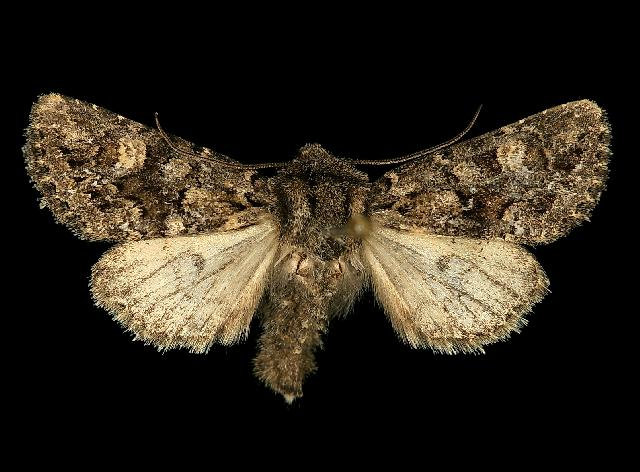

Scientific classification
- Kingdom: Animalia
- Phylum: Arthropoda
- Class: Insecta
- Order: Lepidoptera
- Superfamily: Noctuoidea
- Family: Noctuidae
- Tribe: Eriopygini
- Genus: Fergusonix; Mustelin & Leuschner, 2000

= Fergusonix =

Genus of moths

Fergusonix is a genus of moths of the family Noctuidae.

== Species ==
- Fergusonix januaris Mustelin & Leuschner, 2000
