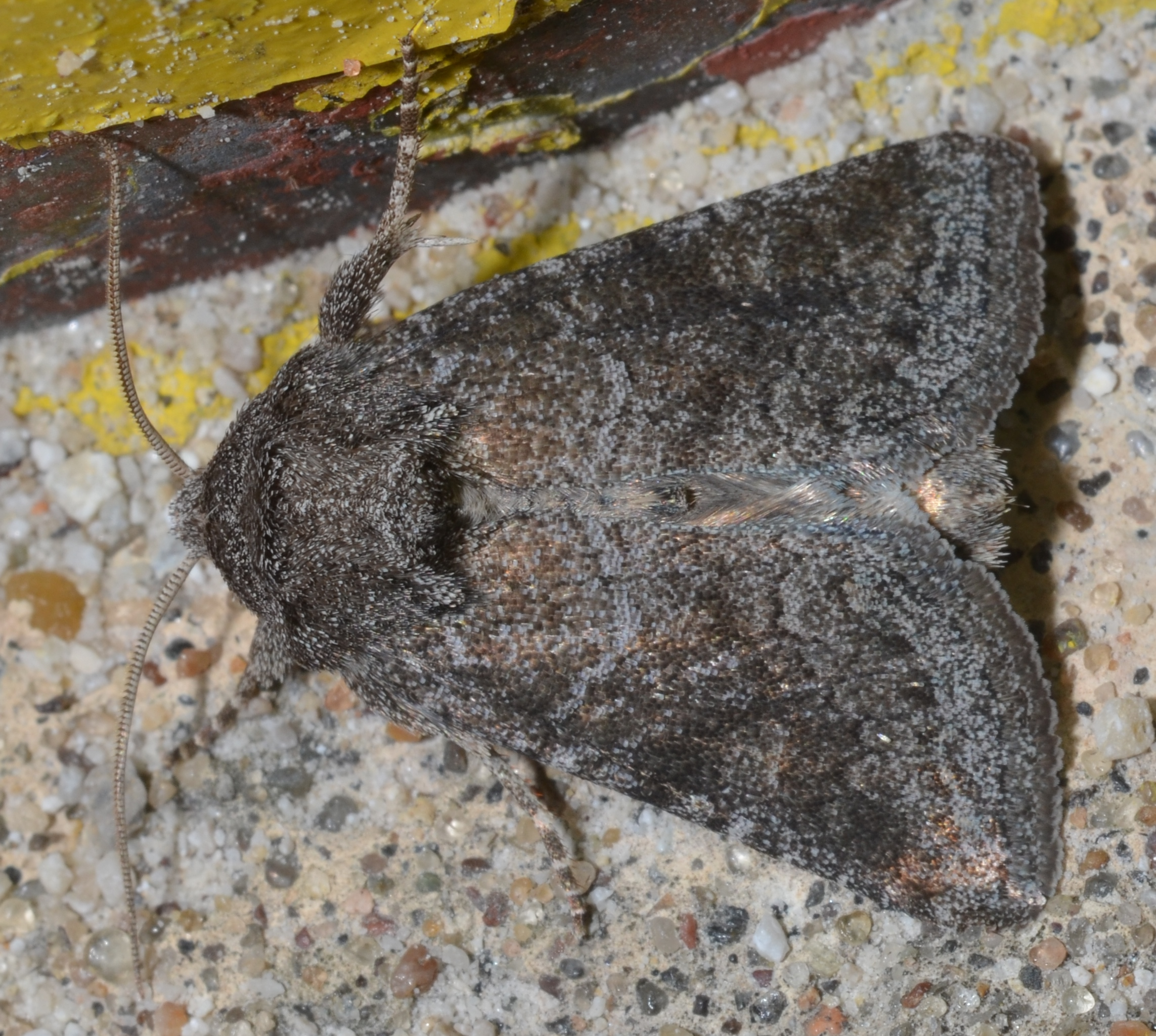

Scientific classification
- Kingdom: Animalia
- Phylum: Arthropoda
- Clade: Pancrustacea
- Class: Insecta
- Order: Lepidoptera
- Superfamily: Noctuoidea
- Family: Noctuidae
- Genus: Lacinipolia
- Species: L. meditata

Binomial name
- Lacinipolia meditata (Grote, 1873)

Synonyms
- Lacinipolia brachiolum (Harvey, 1876); Lacinipolia determinata (Smith, 1891); Lacinipolia rubrifusa (Hampson, 1905)

= Lacinipolia meditata =

Species of moth

Lacinipolia meditata, or the thinker moth, is a species of cutworm or dart moth in the family Noctuidae. It is found in North America.

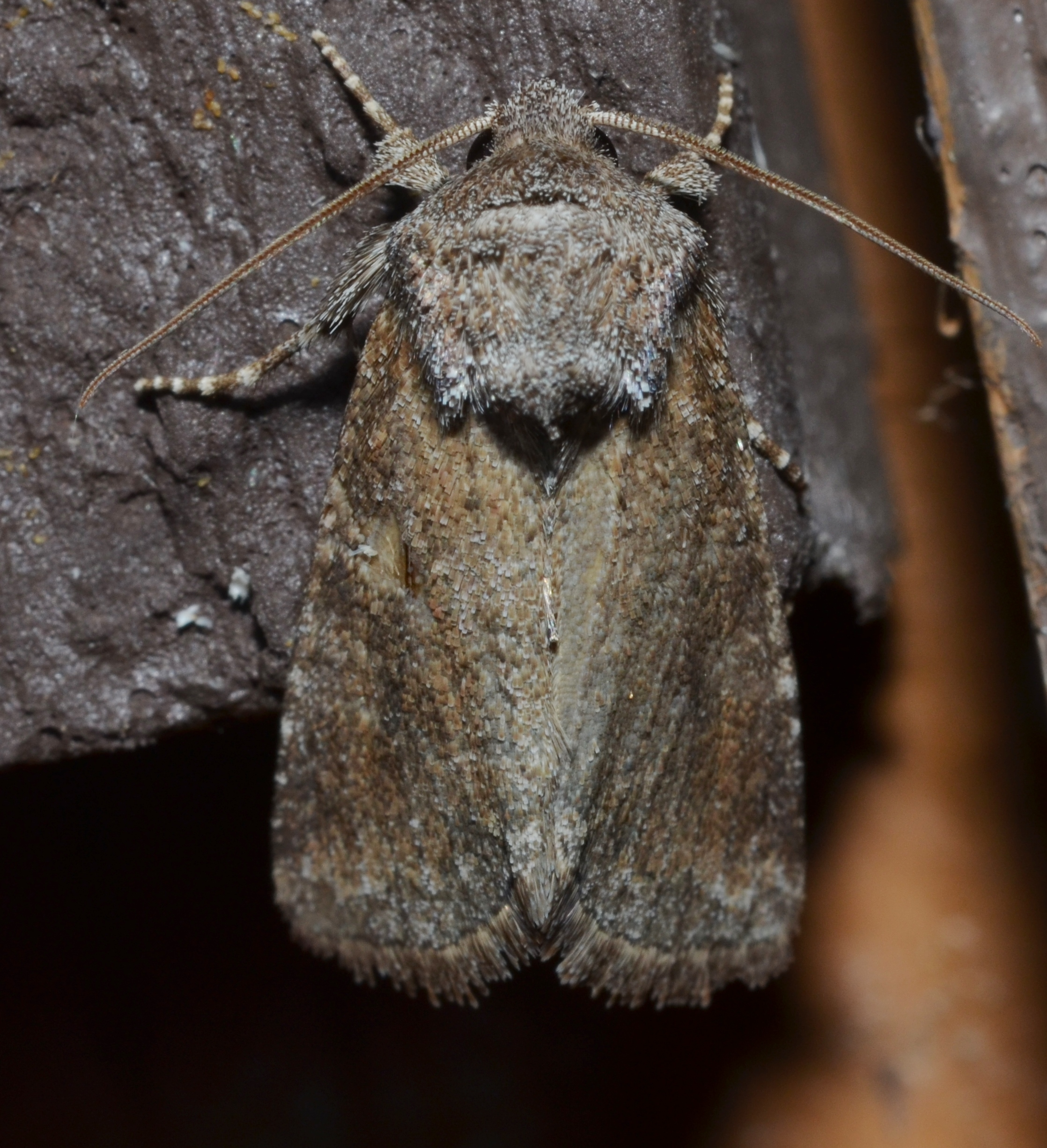
The thinker moth, Lacinipolia meditata

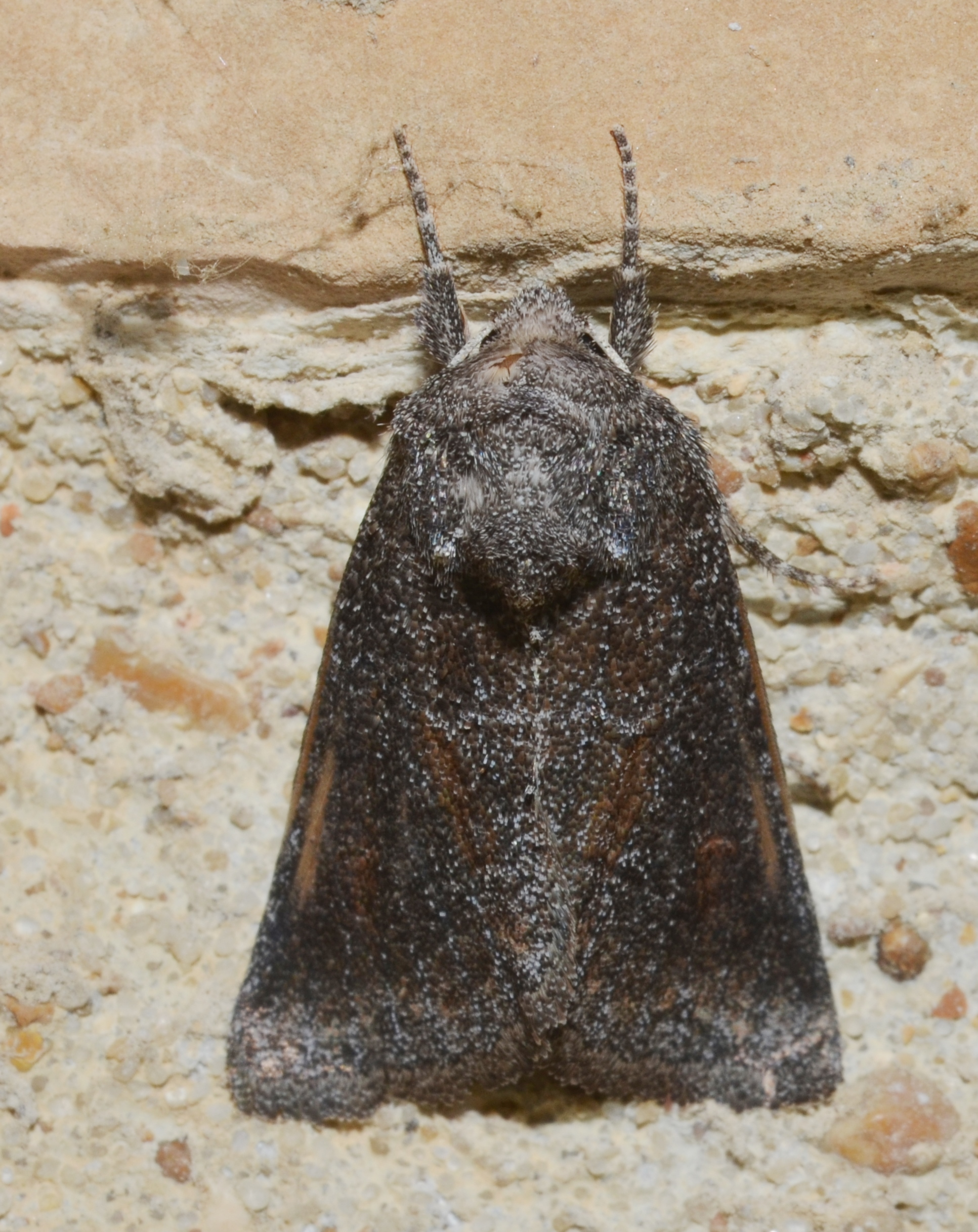
The thinker moth, Lacinipolia meditata
