= Zosteropoda elevata =

Scientific classification
- Domain: Eukaryota
- Kingdom: Animalia
- Phylum: Arthropoda
- Class: Insecta
- Order: Lepidoptera
- Superfamily: Noctuoidea
- Family: Noctuidae
- Genus: Zosteropoda
- Species: Z. elevata

Binomial name
- Zosteropoda elevata Draudt, 1924

Species of moth

Zosteropoda elevata is a moth of the family Noctuidae. It is found in northern South America, including Colombia.
