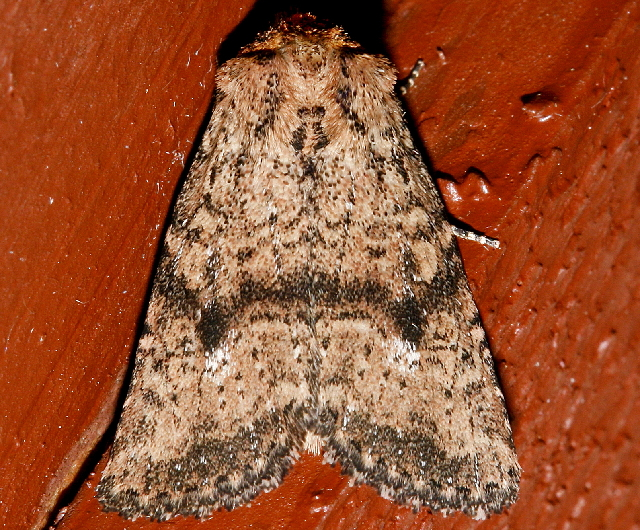

Scientific classification
- Domain: Eukaryota
- Kingdom: Animalia
- Phylum: Arthropoda
- Class: Insecta
- Order: Lepidoptera
- Superfamily: Noctuoidea
- Family: Noctuidae
- Genus: Homorthodes
- Species: H. hanhami

Binomial name
- Homorthodes hanhami (Barnes & McDunnough, 1911)

= Homorthodes hanhami =

Species of moth

Homorthodes hanhami is a species of cutworm or dart moth in the family Noctuidae first described by William Barnes and James Halliday McDunnough in 1911. It is found in North America.

The MONA or Hodges number for Homorthodes hanhami is 10539.

== Subspecies ==
Two subspecies belong to Homorthodes hanhami:

- Homorthodes hanhami hanhami^{g}
- Homorthodes hanhami semicarnea Barnes & McDunnough, 1918^{c g}

Data sources: i = ITIS, c = Catalogue of Life, g = GBIF, b = BugGuide
