= Lacinipolia incurva =

Scientific classification
- Kingdom: Animalia
- Phylum: Arthropoda
- Clade: Pancrustacea
- Class: Insecta
- Order: Lepidoptera
- Superfamily: Noctuoidea
- Family: Noctuidae
- Genus: Lacinipolia
- Species: L. incurva

Binomial name
- Lacinipolia incurva (Smith, 1888)

Synonyms
- Mamestra incurva Smith, 1888

Species of moth

Lacinipolia incurva is a species of moth in the family Noctuidae (owlet moths). It was described by John B. Smith in 1888 and is found in North America, where it has been recorded from California, Arizona, New Mexico, Texas, Utah and Colorado.

The wingspan is about 25 mm.

The larvae have been recorded feeding on dead leaves of Quercus hypoleucoides.

The MONA or Hodges number for Lacinipolia incurva is 10373.
