= Lacinipolia parvula =

Scientific classification
- Kingdom: Animalia
- Phylum: Arthropoda
- Clade: Pancrustacea
- Class: Insecta
- Order: Lepidoptera
- Superfamily: Noctuoidea
- Family: Noctuidae
- Genus: Lacinipolia
- Species: L. parvula

Binomial name
- Lacinipolia parvula (Herrich-Schäffer, 1868)

Synonyms
- Mamestra parvula Herrich-Schäffer, 1868

Species of moth

Lacinipolia parvula is a moth of the family Noctuidae first described by Gottlieb August Wilhelm Herrich-Schäffer in 1868. It is found in Florida and on Cuba and Puerto Rico.

The wingspan is 23–26 mm.
