= Pseudorthodes virgula =

Scientific classification
- Kingdom: Animalia
- Phylum: Arthropoda
- Class: Insecta
- Order: Lepidoptera
- Superfamily: Noctuoidea
- Family: Noctuidae
- Genus: Pseudorthodes
- Species: P. virgula

Binomial name
- Pseudorthodes virgula (Grote, 1883)

Species of moth

Pseudorthodes virgula is a species of cutworm or dart moth in the family Noctuidae. It is found in North America.

The MONA or Hodges number for Pseudorthodes virgula is 10584.
