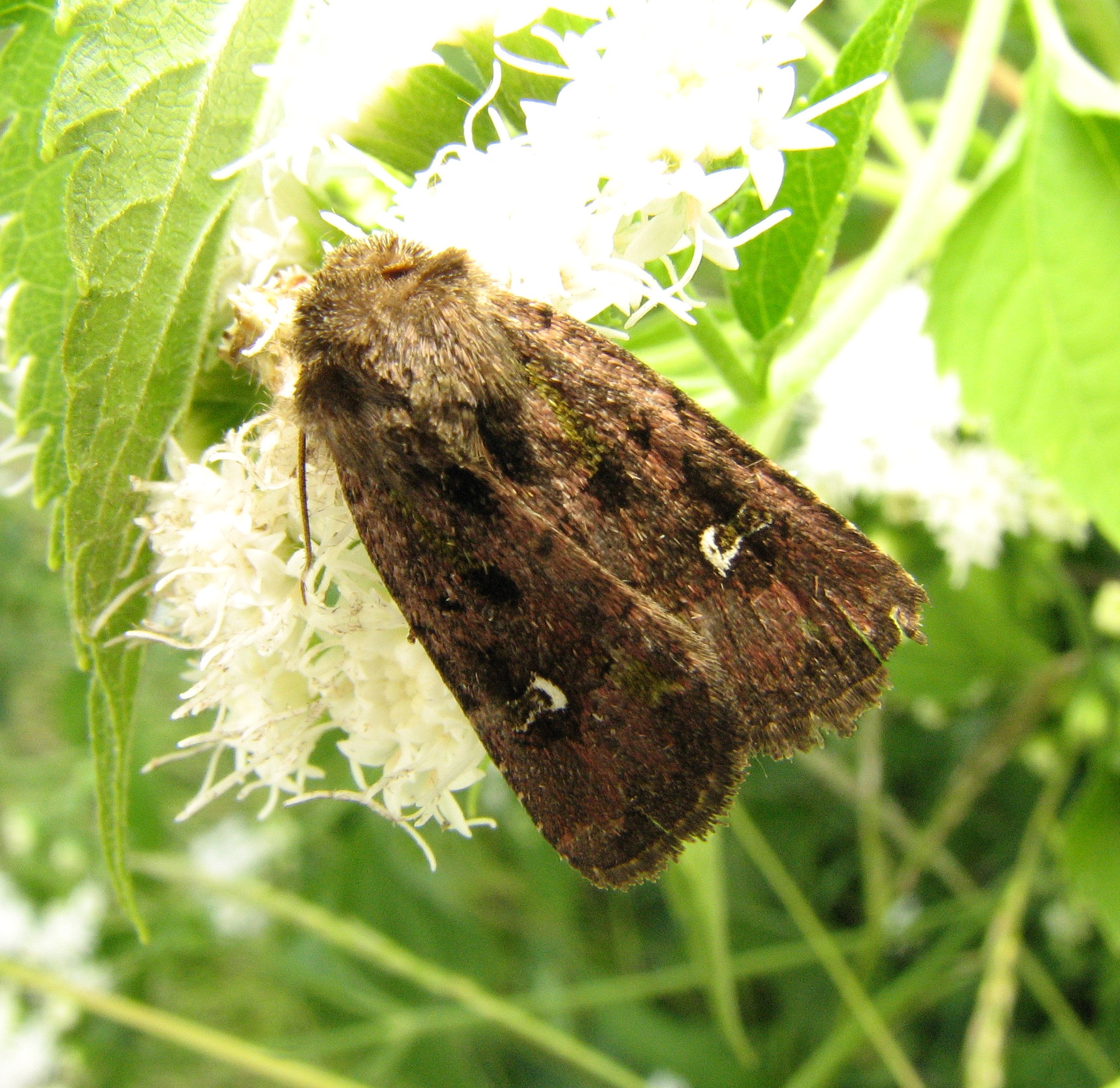

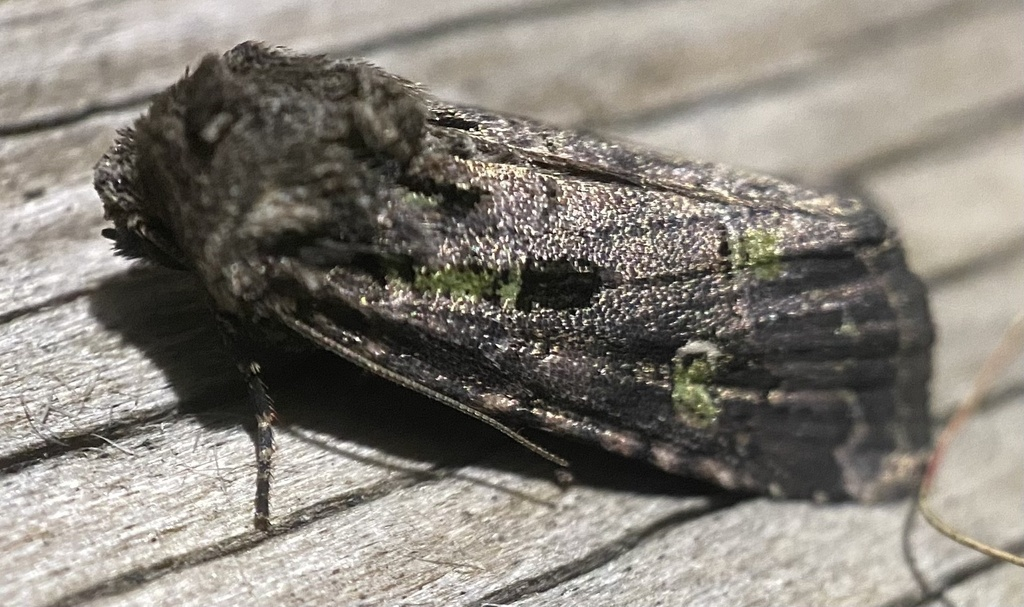

Scientific classification
- Domain: Eukaryota
- Kingdom: Animalia
- Phylum: Arthropoda
- Class: Insecta
- Order: Lepidoptera
- Superfamily: Noctuoidea
- Family: Noctuidae
- Genus: Lacinipolia
- Species: L. renigera

Binomial name
- Lacinipolia renigera (Stephens, 1829)

Synonyms
- Celaena renigera; Celaena herbimacula; Celaena infecta

= Lacinipolia renigera =

Species of moth

Lacinipolia renigera (kidney-spotted minor or bristly cutworm) is a species of moth of the family Noctuidae. The moth flies from May to October depending on the location.

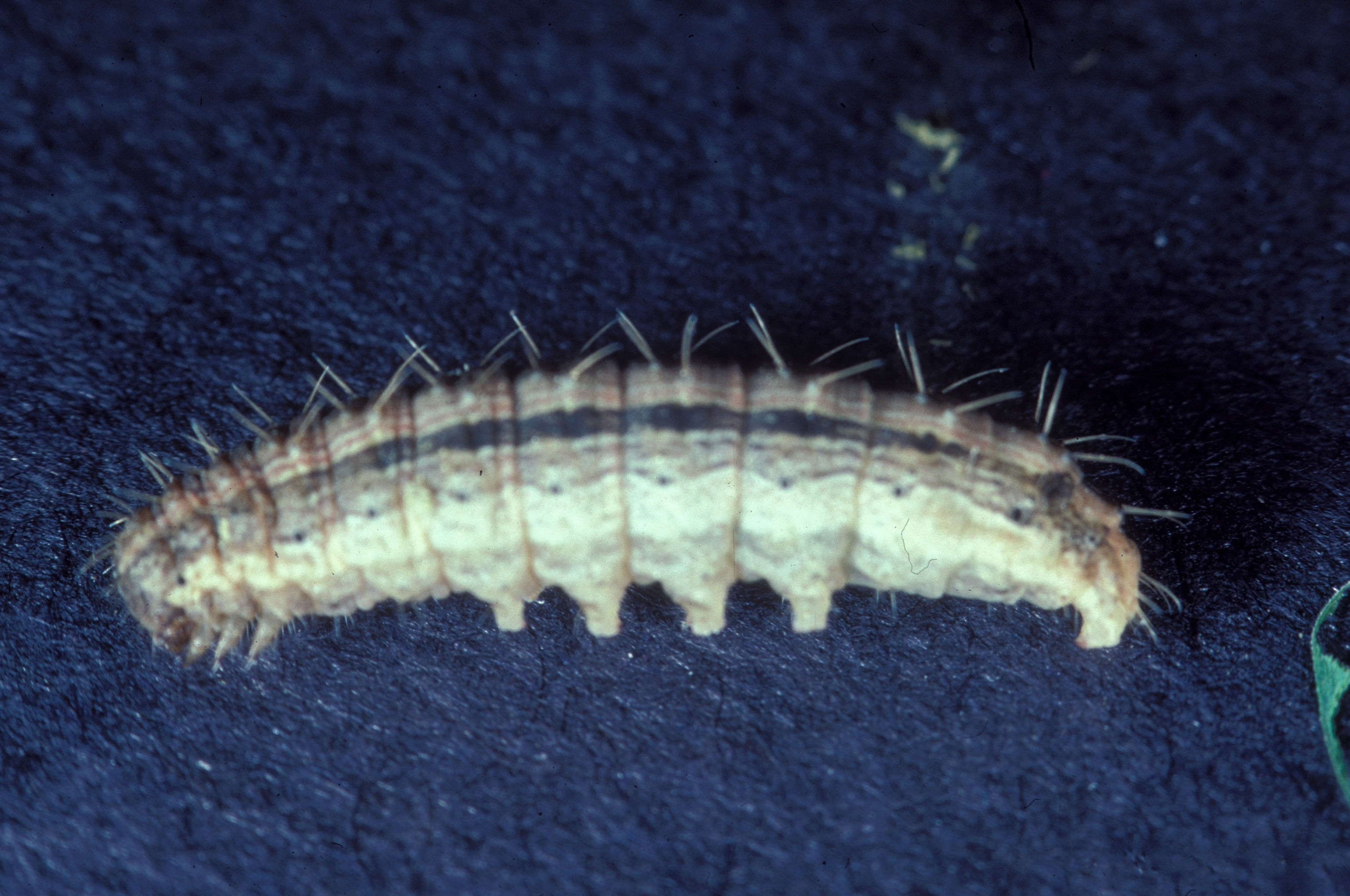
Caterpillar

== Description ==
Adults of L. reginera rest with their hindwings tucked underneath their forewings, giving them an arrowhead-like or tented shape. The forewings are dark greyish-brown with three green spots, one of which is bordered with white. The hindwing is primarily whitish gray and fades into a darker gray color closer to the margin. Their wingspan is 21–30 mm, significantly smaller than most other members of the Noctuidae family.

== Range and Habitat ==
It is endemic to most of North America with the exception of Yukon and Alaska, though it appears to be absent from the Gulf coastal plain and sparse in the western U.S.

== Ecology ==
The larvae feed on a wide variety of herbaceous plants such as the Chicory, Dandelions, Clovers and more. They are also considered a pest species of several agricultural crops, including Cabbage, Lettuce and Corn.
