= Pseudorthodes puerilis =

Scientific classification
- Kingdom: Animalia
- Phylum: Arthropoda
- Class: Insecta
- Order: Lepidoptera
- Superfamily: Noctuoidea
- Family: Noctuidae
- Genus: Pseudorthodes
- Species: P. puerilis

Binomial name
- Pseudorthodes puerilis (Grote, 1874)

Species of moth

Pseudorthodes puerilis is a species of cutworm or dart moth in the family Noctuidae. It is found in North America.

The MONA or Hodges number for Pseudorthodes puerilis is 10583.
