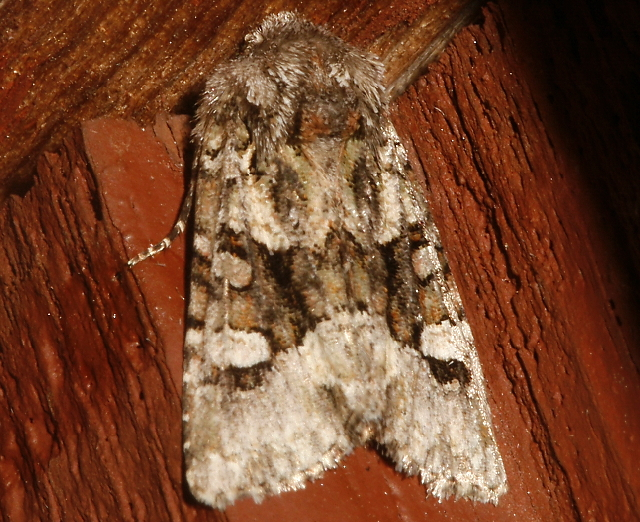

Scientific classification
- Kingdom: Animalia
- Phylum: Arthropoda
- Clade: Pancrustacea
- Class: Insecta
- Order: Lepidoptera
- Superfamily: Noctuoidea
- Family: Noctuidae
- Genus: Lacinipolia
- Species: L. comis

Binomial name
- Lacinipolia comis (Grote, 1876)

Synonyms
- Lacinipolia lunolacta (Smith, 1903)

= Lacinipolia comis =

Species of moth

Lacinipolia comis is a species of cutworm or dart moth in the family Noctuidae. It is found in North America.

The MONA or Hodges number for Lacinipolia comis is 10408.
