= Miodera =

Scientific classification
- Domain: Eukaryota
- Kingdom: Animalia
- Phylum: Arthropoda
- Class: Insecta
- Order: Lepidoptera
- Superfamily: Noctuoidea
- Family: Noctuidae
- Tribe: Eriopygini
- Genus: Miodera; Smith, 1908

Genus of moths

Miodera is a genus of moths of the family Noctuidae.

== Species ==
- Miodera eureka Barnes & Benjamin, 1926
- Miodera stigmata Smith, 1908
