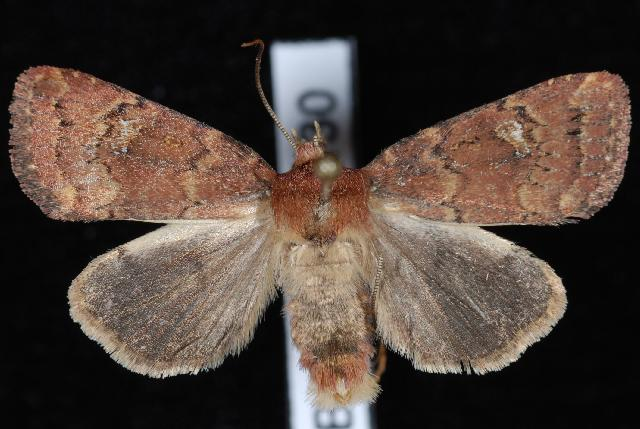
- Pseudorthodes irrorata

Scientific classification
- Domain: Eukaryota
- Kingdom: Animalia
- Phylum: Arthropoda
- Class: Insecta
- Order: Lepidoptera
- Superfamily: Noctuoidea
- Family: Noctuidae
- Tribe: Eriopygini
- Genus: Pseudorthodes; Morrison, 1874

= Pseudorthodes =

Genus of moths

Pseudorthodes is a genus of moths of the family Noctuidae.

== Species ==
- Pseudorthodes angustimargo (Dyar, 1910)
- Pseudorthodes ignescens (Schaus, 1903)
- Pseudorthodes iole (Schaus, 1894)
- Pseudorthodes irrorata (Smith, 1888)
- Pseudorthodes keela (Smith, 1908)
- Pseudorthodes puerilis (Grote, 1874)
- Pseudorthodes vecors (Guenée, 1852) (=Pseudorthodes imora (Strecker, 1898), Pseudorthodes calceolaris (Strecker, 1900))
- Pseudorthodes virgula (Grote, 1883)
