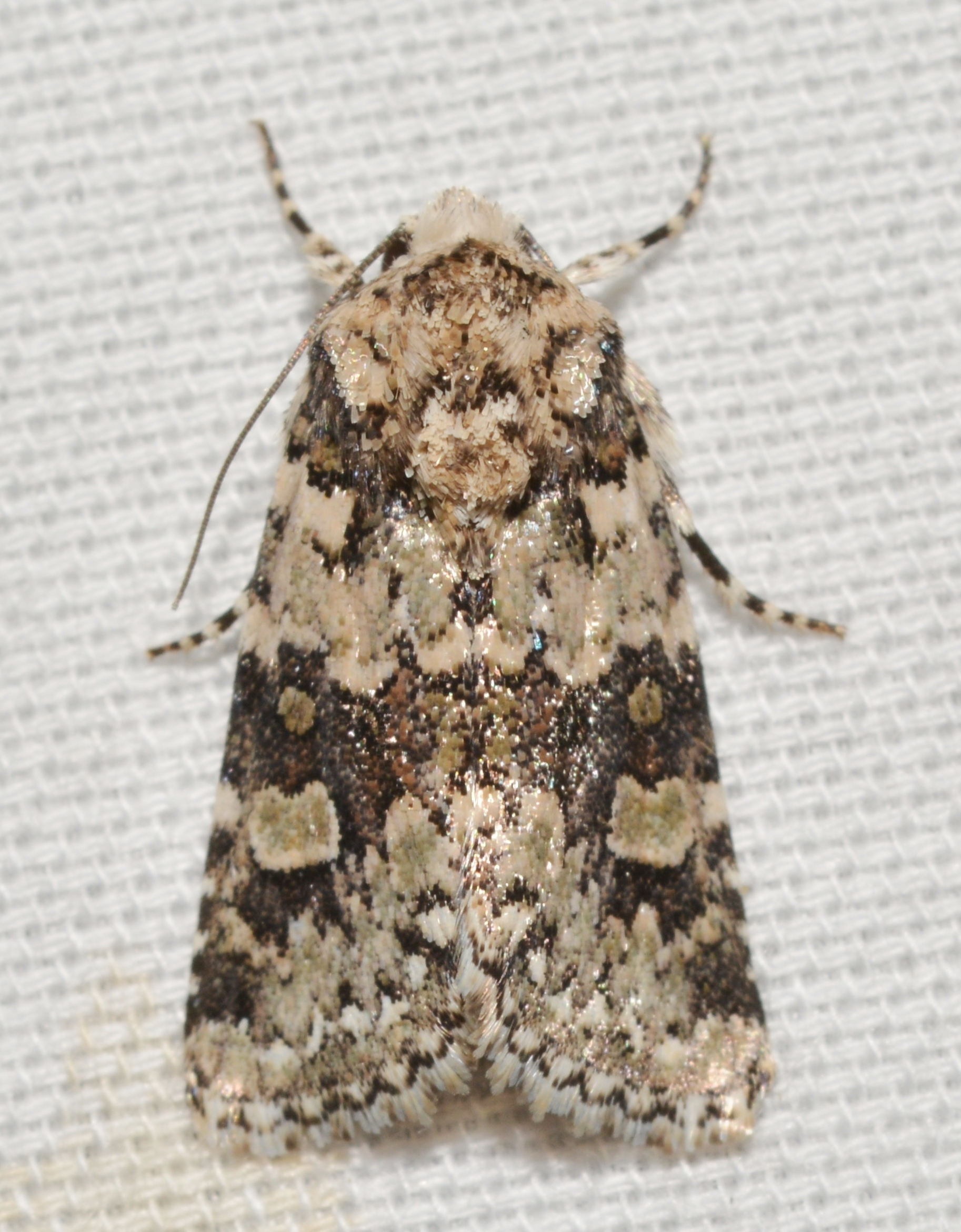

Scientific classification
- Kingdom: Animalia
- Phylum: Arthropoda
- Clade: Pancrustacea
- Class: Insecta
- Order: Lepidoptera
- Superfamily: Noctuoidea
- Family: Noctuidae
- Genus: Lacinipolia
- Species: L. buscki

Binomial name
- Lacinipolia buscki (Barnes & Benjamin, 1927)

= Lacinipolia buscki =

Species of moth

Lacinipolia buscki is a species of cutworm or dart moth in the family Noctuidae first described by William Barnes and Foster Hendrickson Benjamin in 1927. It is found in Australia and North America.
