= Anhimella =

Scientific classification
- Domain: Eukaryota
- Kingdom: Animalia
- Phylum: Arthropoda
- Class: Insecta
- Order: Lepidoptera
- Superfamily: Noctuoidea
- Family: Noctuidae
- Tribe: Eriopygini
- Genus: Anhimella; McDunnough, 1943

Genus of moths

Anhimella is a genus of moths of the family Noctuidae.

== Species ==
- Anhimella contrahens (Walker, 1860)
- Anhimella pacifica McDunnough, 1943
- Anhimella perbrunnea (Grote, 1879)
