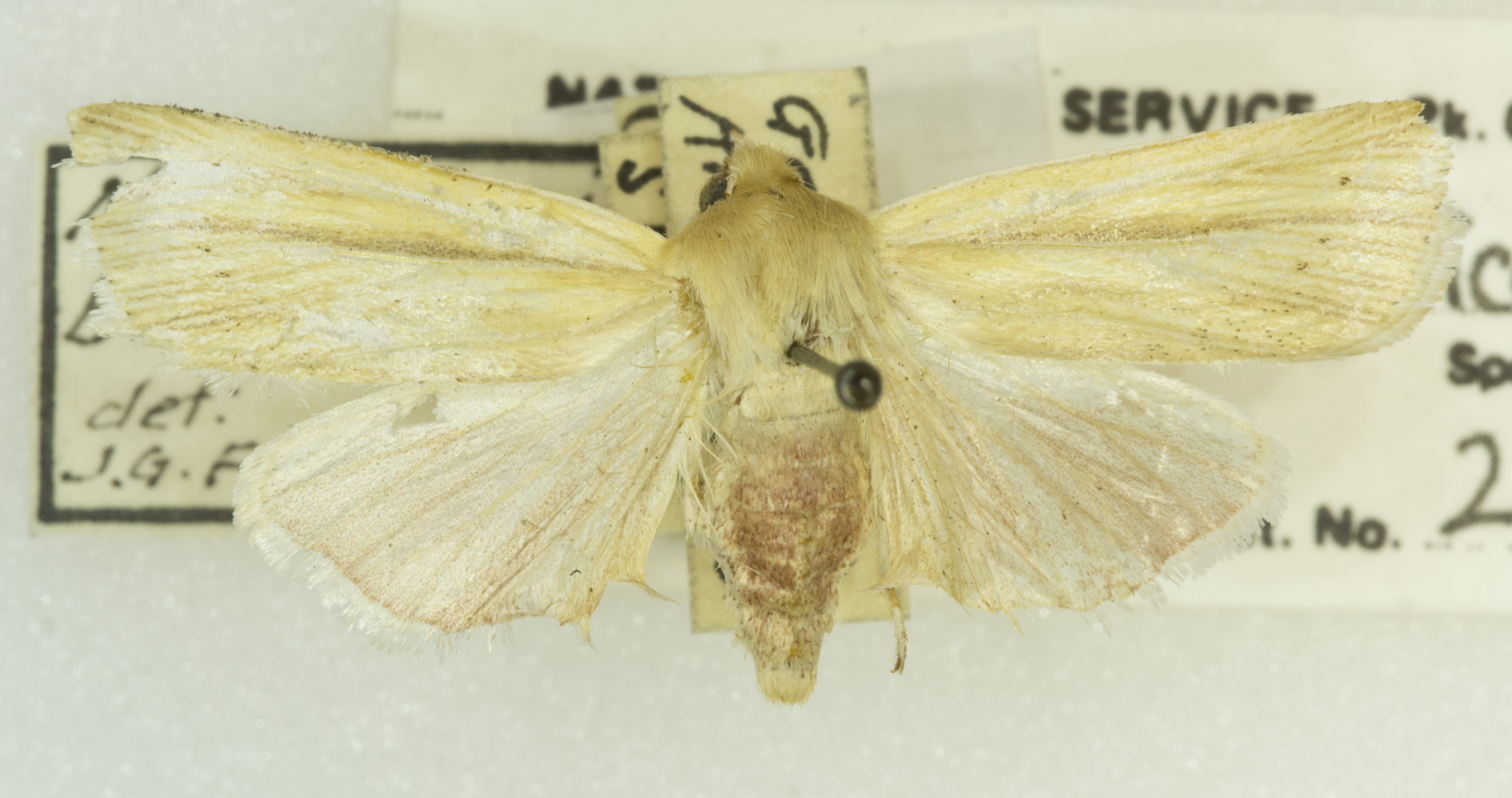

Scientific classification
- Kingdom: Animalia
- Phylum: Arthropoda
- Clade: Pancrustacea
- Class: Insecta
- Order: Lepidoptera
- Superfamily: Noctuoidea
- Family: Noctuidae
- Genus: Neleucania
- Species: N. praegracilis

Binomial name
- Neleucania praegracilis (Grote, 1877)

Synonyms
- Neleucania bicolorata (Grote, 1881); Neleucania citronella Smith, 1902; Neleucania niveicosta Smith, 1902; Neleucania suavis (Barnes & McDunnough, 1912)

= Neleucania praegracilis =

Species of moth

Neleucania praegracilis is a species of cutworm or dart moth in the family Noctuidae first described by Augustus Radcliffe Grote in 1877. It is found in North America.

The MONA or Hodges number for Neleucania praegracilis is 10613.
