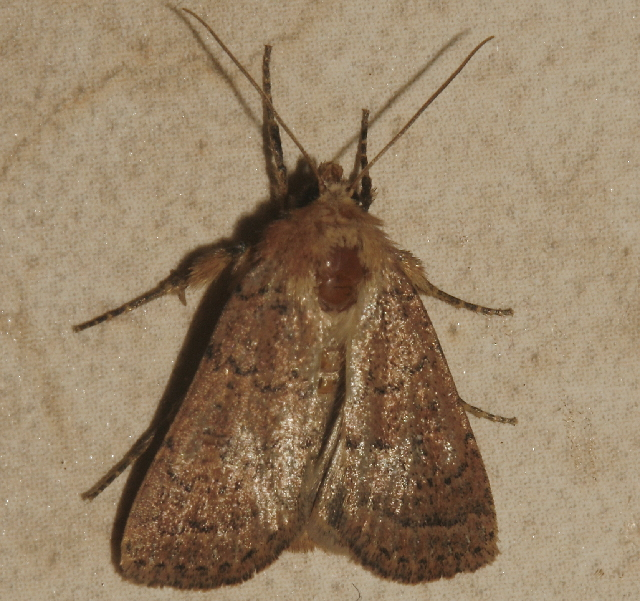

Scientific classification
- Kingdom: Animalia
- Phylum: Arthropoda
- Clade: Pancrustacea
- Class: Insecta
- Order: Lepidoptera
- Superfamily: Noctuoidea
- Family: Noctuidae
- Genus: Homorthodes
- Species: H. communis

Binomial name
- Homorthodes communis (Dyar, 1904)

= Homorthodes communis =

Species of moth

Homorthodes communis, the alder Quaker, is a species of cutworm or dart moth in the family Noctuidae. It is found in North America.
