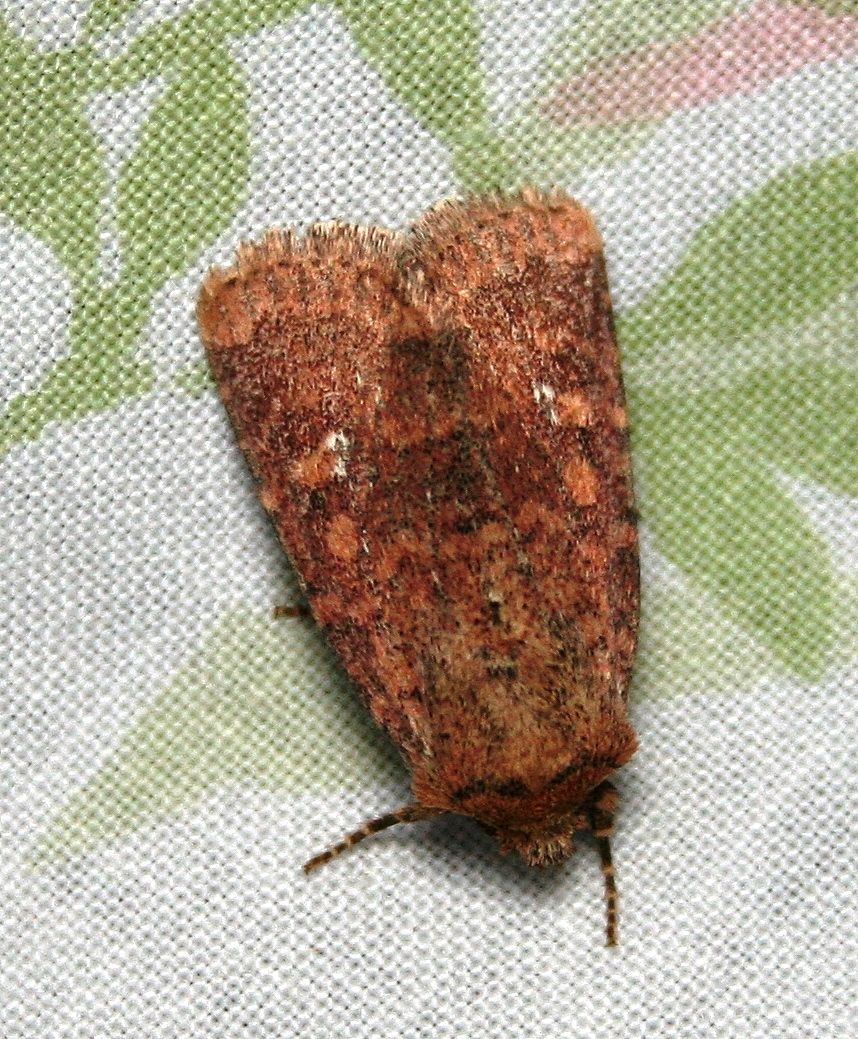

Scientific classification
- Domain: Eukaryota
- Kingdom: Animalia
- Phylum: Arthropoda
- Class: Insecta
- Order: Lepidoptera
- Superfamily: Noctuoidea
- Family: Noctuidae
- Tribe: Eriopygini
- Genus: Homorthodes; McDunnough, 1943

= Homorthodes =

Genus of moths

Homorthodes is a genus of moths of the family Noctuidae.

== Selected species ==
- Homorthodes affurata (Hampson, 1905)
- Homorthodes carneola McDunnough, 1943
- Homorthodes communis (Dyar, 1904)
- Homorthodes discreta (Barnes & McDunnough, 1916)
- Homorthodes dubia (Barnes & McDunnough, 1912)
- Homorthodes euxoiformis (Barnes & McDunnough, 1913)
- Homorthodes flosca (Smith, 1906)
- Homorthodes fractura (Smith, 1906)
- Homorthodes furfurata (Grote, 1874)
- Homorthodes gigantoides (Barnes & McDunnough, 1912)
- Homorthodes hanhami (Barnes & McDunnough, 1911)
- Homorthodes lindseyi - Southern Scurfy Quaker Moth
- Homorthodes mania (Strecker, 1899)
- Homorthodes noverca (Grote, 1878)
- Homorthodes perturba McDunnough, 1943
- Homorthodes rectiflava (Smith, 1908)
- Homorthodes reliqua (Smith, 1899)
- Homorthodes rubritincta McDunnough, 1943
- Homorthodes uniformis (Smith, 1888)
