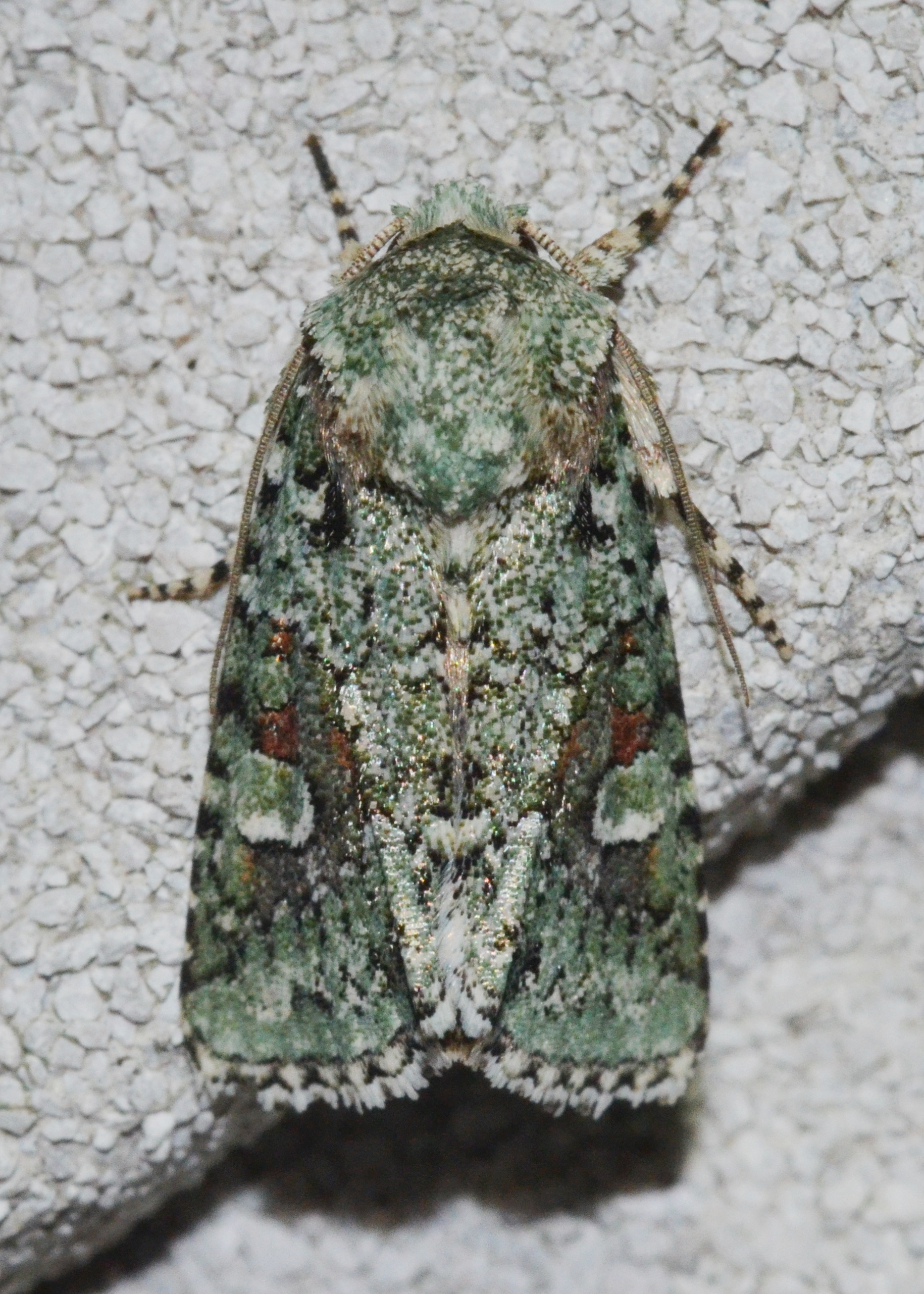

Scientific classification
- Kingdom: Animalia
- Phylum: Arthropoda
- Class: Insecta
- Order: Lepidoptera
- Superfamily: Noctuoidea
- Family: Noctuidae
- Genus: Lacinipolia
- Species: L. laudabilis

Binomial name
- Lacinipolia laudabilis (Guenée, 1852)

Synonyms
- Hecatera laudabilis Guenee, 1852; Hapalia indicans Walker, 1857; Polia laudabilis f. lichenea Draudt, 1924; Polia laudabilis f. suda Draudt, 1924; Lacinipolia laudabilis f. mediosuffusa Strand, 1917

= Lacinipolia laudabilis =

Species of moth

Lacinipolia laudabilis, the laudable arches moth, is a moth of the family Noctuidae. It is found in the United States, where it has been recorded from Alabama, California, Florida, Georgia, Kentucky, Maryland, North Carolina, Oklahoma, Massachusetts, Pennsylvania, South Carolina, Tennessee, Texas and Virginia. It is also found in Mexico and Costa Rica. It has been recorded from Great Britain, where it was probably accidentally imported, but it might also be a rare immigrant.

The wingspan is 20–28 mm. Adults have been recorded on wing year round.

The larvae feed on various herbaceous plants.
