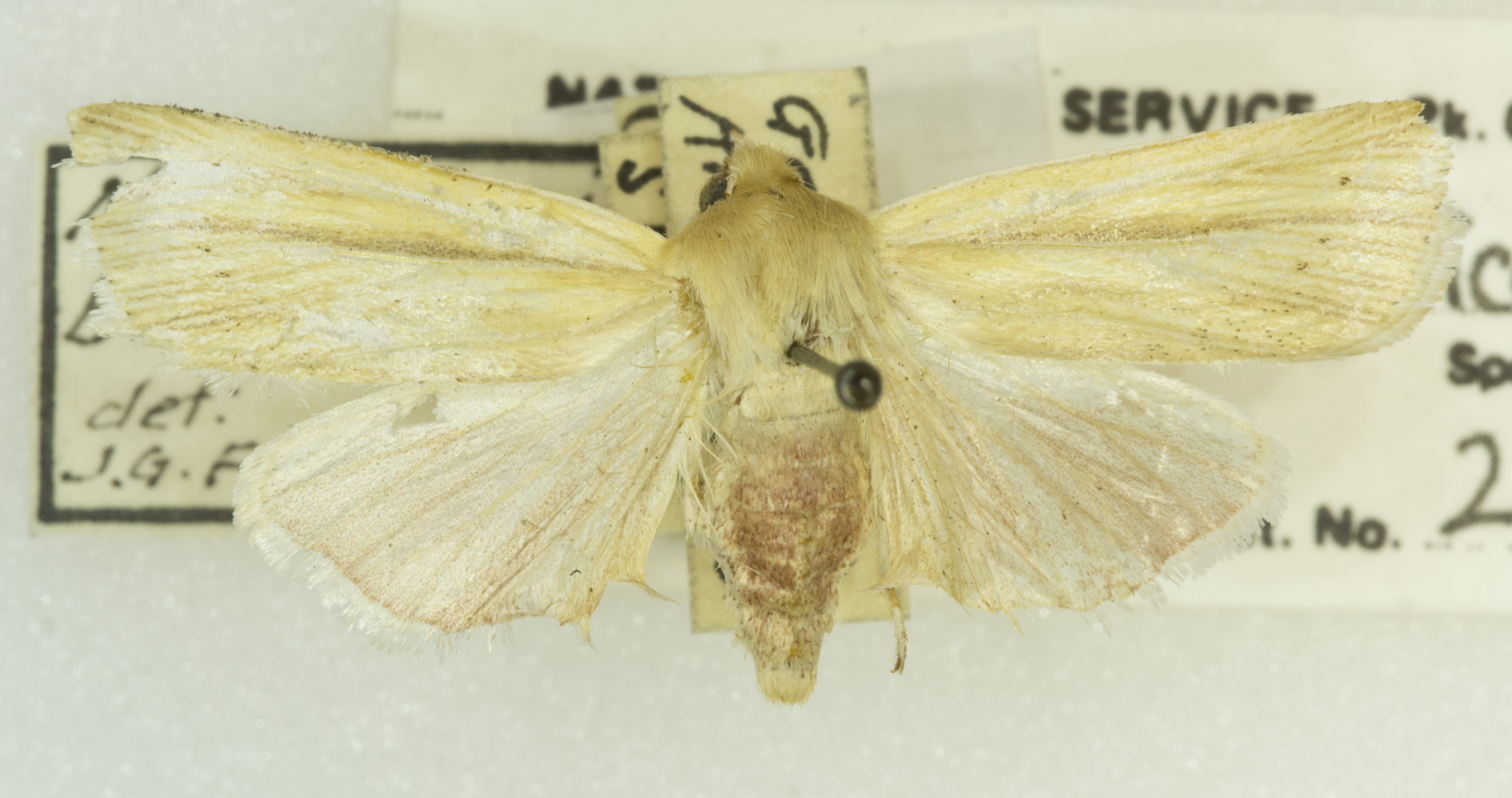
- Neleucania praegracilis

Scientific classification
- Kingdom: Animalia
- Phylum: Arthropoda
- Clade: Pancrustacea
- Class: Insecta
- Order: Lepidoptera
- Superfamily: Noctuoidea
- Family: Noctuidae
- Tribe: Eriopygini
- Genus: Neleucania; Smith, 1902

= Neleucania =

Genus of moths

Neleucania is a genus of moths of the family Noctuidae.

== Species ==
- Neleucania patricia (Grote, 1880)
- Neleucania praegracilis (Grote, 1877) (=Neleucania suavis (Barnes & McDunnough, 1912), Neleucania bicolorata (Grote, 1881), Neleucania niveicosta Smith, 1902, Neleucania citronella Smith, 1902)
