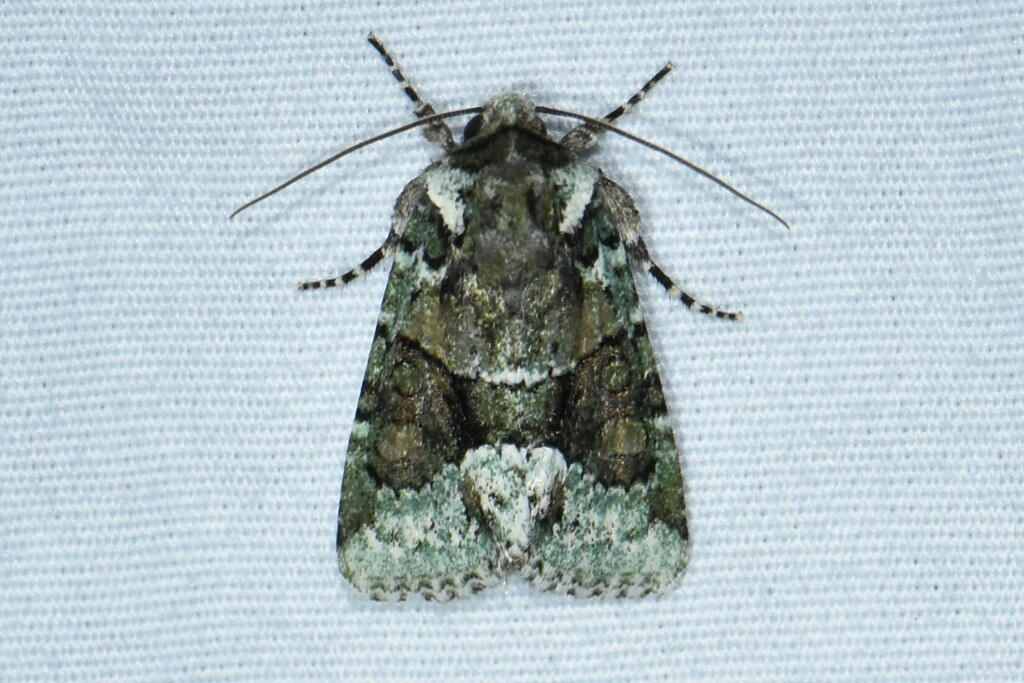
- Explicit Arches in Grayson County, Texas

Scientific classification
- Kingdom: Animalia
- Phylum: Arthropoda
- Clade: Pancrustacea
- Class: Insecta
- Order: Lepidoptera
- Superfamily: Noctuoidea
- Family: Noctuidae
- Genus: Lacinipolia
- Species: L. explicata

Binomial name
- Lacinipolia explicata McDunnough, 1937

= Lacinipolia explicata =

Species of moth

Lacinipolia explicata, also known as the explicit arches, is a moth of the family Noctuidae. It is found in the southeastern part of the United States, from Kentucky and North Carolina south to Florida and west to Missouri and Texas.

The wingspan is 28–30 mm. Adults are on wing in April and again in September in two generations per year.

The larvae feed on Trifolium species and Taraxacum officinale.
