= Homorthodes gigantoides =

Scientific classification
- Kingdom: Animalia
- Phylum: Arthropoda
- Clade: Pancrustacea
- Class: Insecta
- Order: Lepidoptera
- Superfamily: Noctuoidea
- Family: Noctuidae
- Genus: Homorthodes
- Species: H. gigantoides

Binomial name
- Homorthodes gigantoides (Barnes & McDunnough, 1912)

Species of moth

Homorthodes gigantoides is a species of cutworm or dart moth in the family Noctuidae first described by William Barnes and James Halliday McDunnough in 1912. It is found in North America.

The MONA or Hodges number for Homorthodes gigantoides is 10545.
