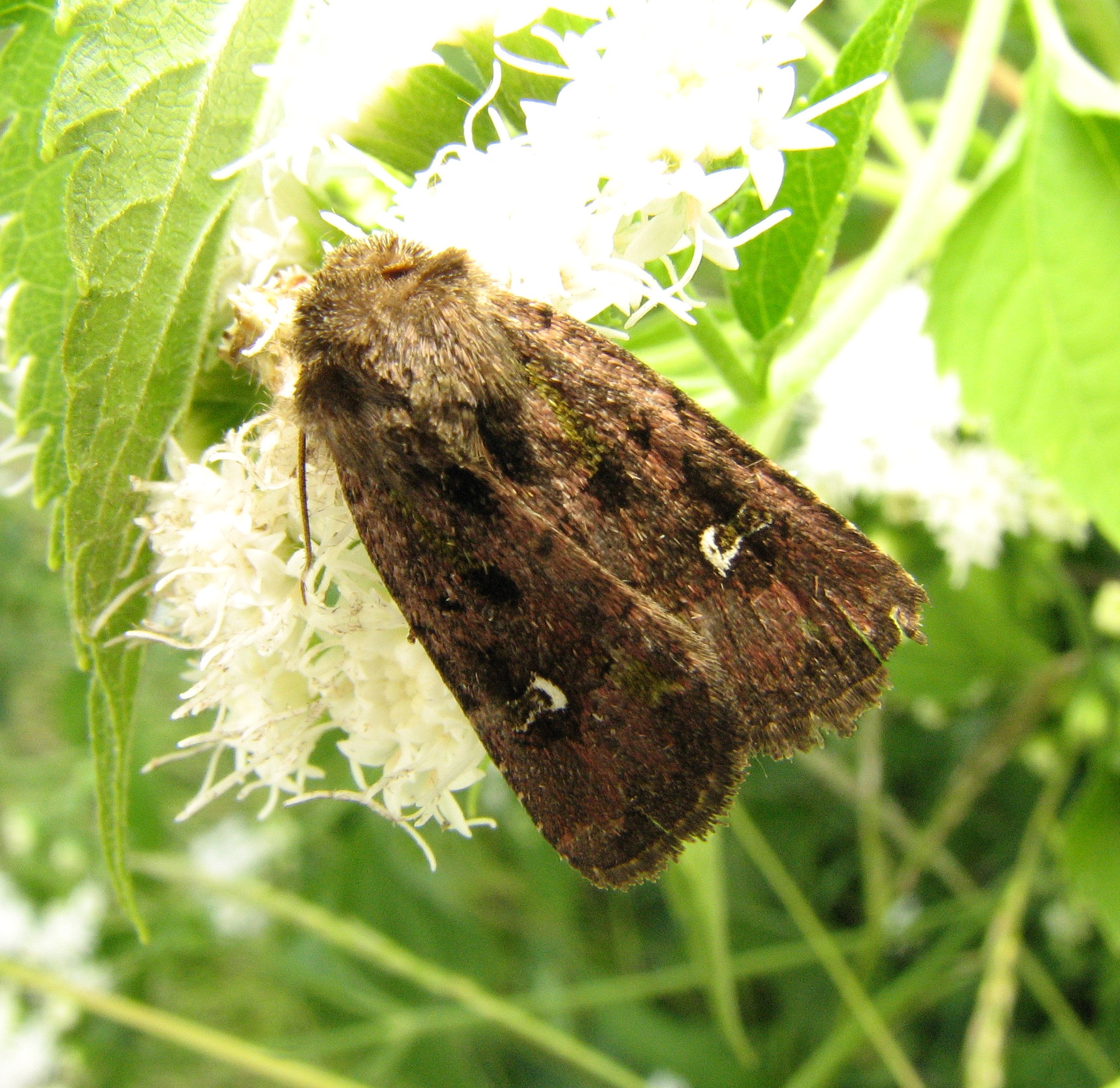
- Lacinipolia renigera

Scientific classification
- Kingdom: Animalia
- Phylum: Arthropoda
- Clade: Pancrustacea
- Class: Insecta
- Order: Lepidoptera
- Superfamily: Noctuoidea
- Family: Noctuidae
- Tribe: Eriopygini
- Genus: Lacinipolia; McDunnough, 1937

= Lacinipolia =

Genus of moths

Lacinipolia is a moth genus in the family Noctuidae.

== Species ==
- Lacinipolia acutipennis (Grote, 1880)
- Lacinipolia agnata (Smith, 1905)
- Lacinipolia aileenae Selman & Leuschner, 2001
- Lacinipolia anguina (Grote, 1881)
- Lacinipolia basiplaga (Smith, 1905)
- Lacinipolia baueri Selman & Leuschner, 2001
- Lacinipolia bucketti Selman & Leuschner, 2001
- Lacinipolia buscki (Barnes & Benjamin, 1927)
- Lacinipolia calcaricosta Todd & Poole, 1981
- Lacinipolia canities (Hampson, 1905)
- Lacinipolia ciniva (Schaus, 1898)
- Lacinipolia circumcincta (Smith, 1891)
- Lacinipolia cleptoschema (Dyar, 1912)
- Lacinipolia comis (Grote, 1876) (syn. L. lunolacta (Smith, 1903))
- Lacinipolia consimilis McDunnough, 1937
- Lacinipolia cuneata (Grote, 1873)
- Lacinipolia datis (Druce, 1894)
- Lacinipolia davena (Smith, 1901)
- Lacinipolia delongi Selman & Leuschner, 2001
- Lacinipolia dima (Dyar, 1916)
- Lacinipolia dimocki Schmidt, 2015
- Lacinipolia distributa (Möschler, 1886)
- Lacinipolia erecta (Walker, [1857])
- Lacinipolia eucyria (Dyar, 1910)
- Lacinipolia explicata McDunnough, 1937 – Explicit Arches
- Lacinipolia falsa (Grote, 1880)
- Lacinipolia fordi Selman & Leuschner, 2001
- Lacinipolia francisca (Smith, 1910)
- Lacinipolia franclemonti Selman & Leuschner, 2001
- Lacinipolia gnata (Grote, 1882)
- Lacinipolia hamara (Druce, 1889)
- Lacinipolia hodeva (Druce, 1889)
- Lacinipolia implicata McDunnough, 1938 – Implicit Arches
- Lacinipolia incurva (Smith, 1888)
- Lacinipolia laudabilis (Guenée, 1852)
- Lacinipolia lepidula (Smith, 1888)
- Lacinipolia leucogramma (Grote, 1873)
- Lacinipolia longiclava (Smith, 1891)
- Lacinipolia lorea (Guenée, 1852)
- Lacinipolia lustralis (Grote, 1875) (syn. L. selama (Strecker, 1898))
- Lacinipolia luteimacula (Barnes & Benjamin, 1925)
- Lacinipolia marinitincta (Harvey, 1875)
- Lacinipolia marmica (Schaus, 1898)
- Lacinipolia martini Selman & Leuschner, 2001
- Lacinipolia meditata (Grote, 1873) (syn. L. brachiolum (Harvey, 1876), L. determinata (Smith, 1891), L. rubrifusa (Hampson, 1905))
- Lacinipolia mimula (Grote, 1883)
- Lacinipolia naevia (Smith, 1898)
- Lacinipolia naida (Dyar, 1910)
- Lacinipolia olivacea (Morrison, 1875)
- Lacinipolia palilis (Harvey, 1875)
- Lacinipolia parens (Schaus, 1894)
- Lacinipolia parvula (Herrich-Schäffer, 1868)
- Lacinipolia patalis (Grote, 1873)
- Lacinipolia pensilis (Grote, 1874)
- Lacinipolia perfragilis (Dyar, 1923)
- Lacinipolia perta (Druce, 1889)
- Lacinipolia phaulocyria (Dyar, 1910)
- Lacinipolia prognata McDunnough, 1940
- Lacinipolia quadrilineata (Grote, 1873)
- Lacinipolia rectilinea (Smith, 1888)
- Lacinipolia renigera (Stephens, 1829) – Bristly Cutworm, Kidney-Spotted Minor
- Lacinipolia rodora (Dyar, 1910)
- Lacinipolia roseosuffusa (Smith, 1900)
- Lacinipolia rubens (Druce, 1889)
- Lacinipolia runica (Hampson, 1918)
- Lacinipolia sareta (Smith, 1906)
- Lacinipolia sharonae Selman & Leuschner, 2001
- Lacinipolia spiculosa (Grote, 1883)
- Lacinipolia stenotis (Hampson, 1905)
- Lacinipolia stricta (Walker, 1865)
- Lacinipolia strigicollis (Wallengren, 1860) (syn. L. illaudabilis (Grote, 1875))
- Lacinipolia subalba Mustelin, 2000
- Lacinipolia surgens (Dyar, 1910)
- Lacinipolia teligera (Morrison, 1875)
- Lacinipolia transvitta (Dyar, 1913)
- Lacinipolia trasca (Dyar, 1912)
- Lacinipolia tricornuta McDunnough, 1937
- Lacinipolia triplehorni Selman & Leuschner, 2001
- Lacinipolia uliginosa (Smith, 1905)
- Lacinipolia umbrosa (Smith, 1888)
- Lacinipolia verruca (Dyar, 1914)
- Lacinipolia vicina (Grote, 1874)
- Lacinipolia viridifera McDunnough, 1937
- Lacinipolia vittula (Grote, 1883)
