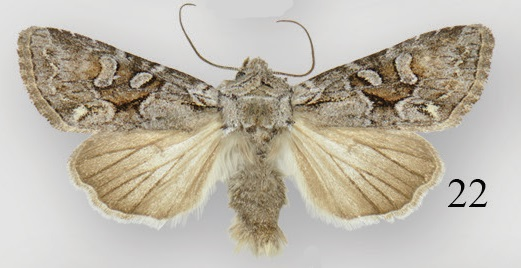
- Male
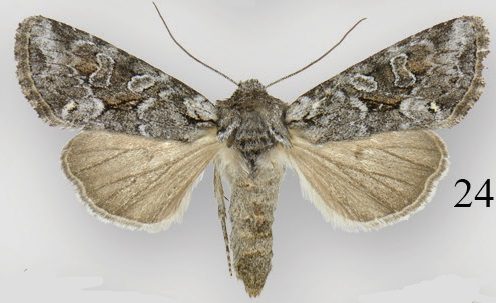
- Female

Scientific classification
- Kingdom: Animalia
- Phylum: Arthropoda
- Clade: Pancrustacea
- Class: Insecta
- Order: Lepidoptera
- Superfamily: Noctuoidea
- Family: Noctuidae
- Genus: Lacinipolia
- Species: L. pensilis

Binomial name
- Lacinipolia pensilis (Grote, 1874)

Synonyms
- Dianthoecia pensilis Grote, 1874

= Lacinipolia pensilis =

Species of moth

Lacinipolia pensilis is a moth in the family Noctuidae. It is found in the western cordilleran region from central British Columbia and western Alberta southward to at least Washington and central Utah.

Adults are similar to Lacinipolia acutipennis, but have better-defined forewing markings, richer brown tones in the forewing medial area, and no tendency for streaky pale patches in the forewing apical area. They are also slightly larger with a broader forewing. Adults have been recorded on wing from August to September.

The larvae are probably ground-dwelling and general feeders on shrubs and herbs.
