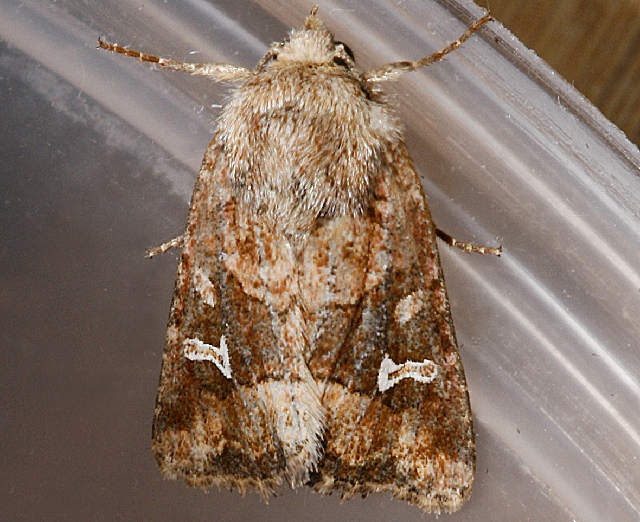

Scientific classification
- Kingdom: Animalia
- Phylum: Arthropoda
- Clade: Pancrustacea
- Class: Insecta
- Order: Lepidoptera
- Superfamily: Noctuoidea
- Family: Noctuidae
- Genus: Lacinipolia
- Species: L. stricta

Binomial name
- Lacinipolia stricta (Walker, 1865)

= Lacinipolia stricta =

Species of moth

Lacinipolia stricta, the brown arches moth, is a species of cutworm or dart moth in the family Noctuidae. It is found in North America.

The MONA or Hodges number for Lacinipolia stricta is 10398.

== Subspecies ==
These three subspecies belong to the species Lacinipolia stricta:

- Lacinipolia stricta kappa Barnes & Benjamin, 1925
- Lacinipolia stricta papka Barnes & Benjamin, 1929
- Lacinipolia stricta stricta
