= Lacinipolia viridifera =

Scientific classification
- Kingdom: Animalia
- Phylum: Arthropoda
- Clade: Pancrustacea
- Class: Insecta
- Order: Lepidoptera
- Superfamily: Noctuoidea
- Family: Noctuidae
- Genus: Lacinipolia
- Species: L. viridifera

Binomial name
- Lacinipolia viridifera McDunnough, 1937

Species of moth

Lacinipolia viridifera is a species of cutworm or dart moth in the family Noctuidae. It is found in North America.

The MONA or Hodges number for Lacinipolia viridifera is 10419.
