= Marilopteryx carancahua =

Scientific classification
- Domain: Eukaryota
- Kingdom: Animalia
- Phylum: Arthropoda
- Class: Insecta
- Order: Lepidoptera
- Superfamily: Noctuoidea
- Family: Noctuidae
- Tribe: Eriopygini
- Genus: Marilopteryx
- Species: M. carancahua

Binomial name
- Marilopteryx carancahua A. Blanchard & Franclemont, 1982

Species of moth

Marilopteryx carancahua is a species of cutworm or dart moth in the family Noctuidae. It is found in North America.

The MONA or Hodges number for Marilopteryx carancahua is 10633.1.
