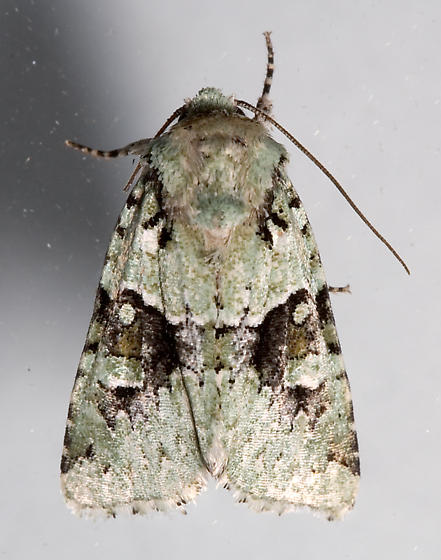

Scientific classification
- Kingdom: Animalia
- Phylum: Arthropoda
- Clade: Pancrustacea
- Class: Insecta
- Order: Lepidoptera
- Superfamily: Noctuoidea
- Family: Noctuidae
- Genus: Lacinipolia
- Species: L. implicata

Binomial name
- Lacinipolia implicata McDunnough, 1938

= Lacinipolia implicata =

Species of moth

Lacinipolia implicata, the implicit arches moth, is a moth of the family Noctuidae. It is found in eastern North America, from Connecticut south to South Carolina, west to Ontario, Michigan and Texas.

The wingspan is 25–32 mm. Adults are on wing from April to October in two generations (with the second brood usually being more numerous).

The larvae feed on a wide range of plants, including Taraxacum officinale.
