= Lacinipolia circumcincta =

Scientific classification
- Kingdom: Animalia
- Phylum: Arthropoda
- Clade: Pancrustacea
- Class: Insecta
- Order: Lepidoptera
- Superfamily: Noctuoidea
- Family: Noctuidae
- Genus: Lacinipolia
- Species: L. circumcincta

Binomial name
- Lacinipolia circumcincta (Smith, 1891)

Species of moth

Lacinipolia circumcincta is a species of cutworm or dart moth in the family Noctuidae. It is found in North America.

The MONA or Hodges number for Lacinipolia circumcincta is 10399.
