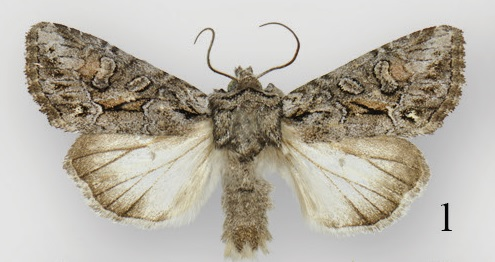
- Male
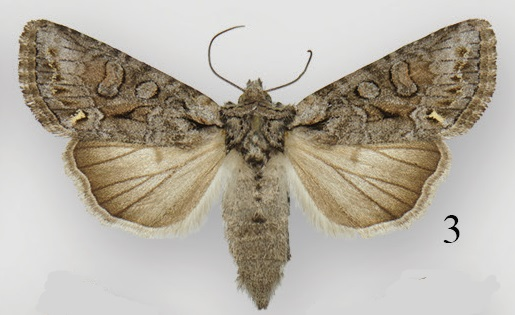
- Female

Scientific classification
- Kingdom: Animalia
- Phylum: Arthropoda
- Clade: Pancrustacea
- Class: Insecta
- Order: Lepidoptera
- Superfamily: Noctuoidea
- Family: Noctuidae
- Genus: Lacinipolia
- Species: L. vicina

Binomial name
- Lacinipolia vicina (Grote, 1874)

Synonyms
- Mamestra vicina Grote, 1874; Mamestra imbuna Smith, 1905

= Lacinipolia vicina =

Species of moth

Lacinipolia vicina is a moth in the family Noctuidae. It is found in Massachusetts, New York, Pennsylvania, Virginia, North Carolina, New Jersey and possibly Indiana.

The length of the forewings is 14–16 mm. Adults have been recorded on wing from April to May and September to October in two generations per year.

The larvae are probably polyphagous ground dwellers.
