= Marilopteryx =

Scientific classification
- Domain: Eukaryota
- Kingdom: Animalia
- Phylum: Arthropoda
- Class: Insecta
- Order: Lepidoptera
- Superfamily: Noctuoidea
- Family: Noctuidae
- Tribe: Eriopygini
- Genus: Marilopteryx; Blanchard & Franclemont, 1982

Genus of moths

Marilopteryx is a genus of moths of the family Noctuidae.

== Species ==
- Marilopteryx carancahua Blanchard & Franclemont, 1982
- Marilopteryx lamptera (Druce, 1890)
- Marilopteryx lutina (Smith, 1902)
