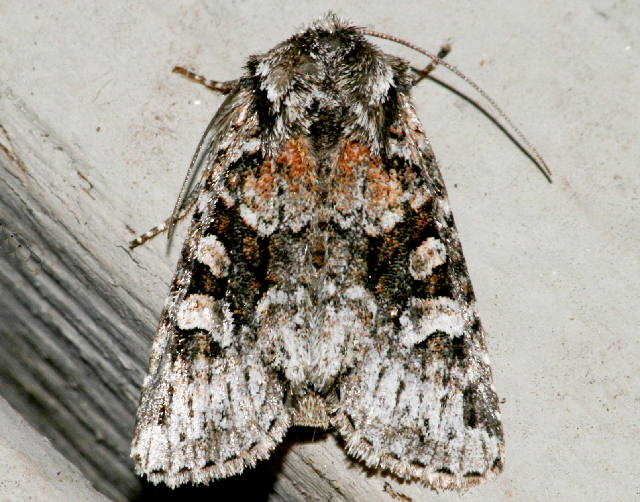

Scientific classification
- Kingdom: Animalia
- Phylum: Arthropoda
- Clade: Pancrustacea
- Class: Insecta
- Order: Lepidoptera
- Superfamily: Noctuoidea
- Family: Noctuidae
- Genus: Lacinipolia
- Species: L. cuneata

Binomial name
- Lacinipolia cuneata (Grote, 1873)

= Lacinipolia cuneata =

Species of moth

Lacinipolia cuneata, the cuneate arches, is a species of cutworm or dart moth in the family Noctuidae. It is found in North America.

The MONA or Hodges number for Lacinipolia cuneata is 10371.
