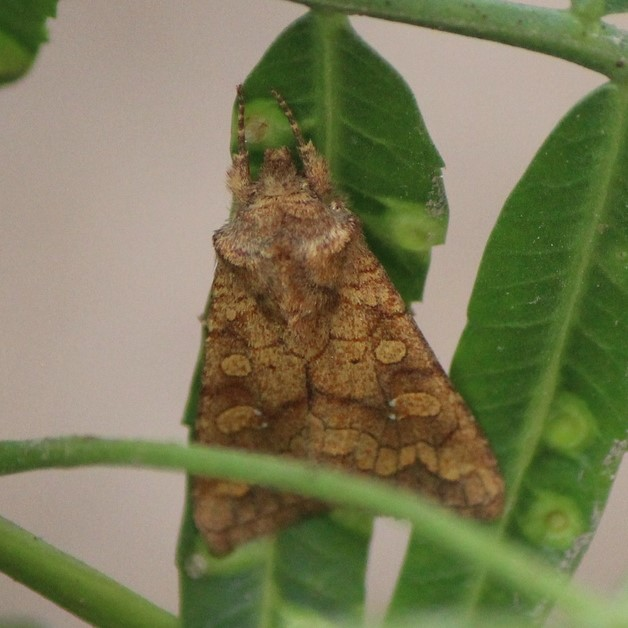
- Hydroeciodes azteca

Scientific classification
- Kingdom: Animalia
- Phylum: Arthropoda
- Class: Insecta
- Order: Lepidoptera
- Superfamily: Noctuoidea
- Family: Noctuidae
- Tribe: Eriopygini
- Genus: Hydroeciodes; Hampson, 1905

= Hydroeciodes =

Genus of moths

Hydroeciodes is a genus of moths of the family Noctuidae.

== Species ==
- Hydroeciodes alala (Druce, 1890)
- Hydroeciodes alternata Dyar, 1926
- Hydroeciodes anastagia Dyar, 1910
- Hydroeciodes aspasta Dyar, 1918
- Hydroeciodes auripurpura (Blanchard, 1968)
- Hydroeciodes azteca (Schaus, 1894)
- Hydroeciodes catadea Dyar, 1921
- Hydroeciodes cauta (Schaus, 1903)
- Hydroeciodes cetebu Dyar, 1923
- Hydroeciodes cirramela Dyar, 1916
- Hydroeciodes compressipuncta Dyar, [1920]
- Hydroeciodes compulsa Draudt, 1924
- Hydroeciodes danastia Dyar, 1910
- Hydroeciodes exagitans Dyar, [1920]
- Hydroeciodes felova Dyar, 1910
- Hydroeciodes impica Dyar, 1918
- Hydroeciodes juvenilis (Grote, 1881)
- Hydroeciodes lepida Draudt, 1924
- Hydroeciodes leucogramma Hampson, 1905
- Hydroeciodes leucopis Hampson, 1905
- Hydroeciodes marcona Schaus, 1921
- Hydroeciodes mendicosa Dyar, 1910
- Hydroeciodes mormon Dyar, 1918
- Hydroeciodes muelleri Draudt, 1924
- Hydroeciodes multesima Draudt, 1924
- Hydroeciodes ochrimacula (Barnes & McDunnough, 1913)
- Hydroeciodes parafea Dyar, 1921
- Hydroeciodes pericopis Dyar, [1927]
- Hydroeciodes pexa (Schaus, 1903)
- Hydroeciodes pexinella Dyar, 1916
- Hydroeciodes piacularis Draudt, 1924
- Hydroeciodes plugmona Dyar, [1927]
- Hydroeciodes pothen Dyar, 1918
- Hydroeciodes pyrastis Dognin, 1907
- Hydroeciodes rectilinea Dyar, 1914
- Hydroeciodes repleta (Bird, 1911)
- Hydroeciodes ritaria Schaus, 1921
- Hydroeciodes ruxis Dyar, 1916
- Hydroeciodes serrata (Grote, 1880)
- Hydroeciodes tintebela Dyar, 1923
- Hydroeciodes traversa Dyar, 1918
- Hydroeciodes xanthina Hampson, 1905
- Hydroeciodes zinda Dyar, 1910
