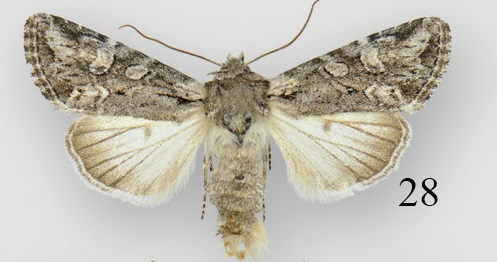
- Male
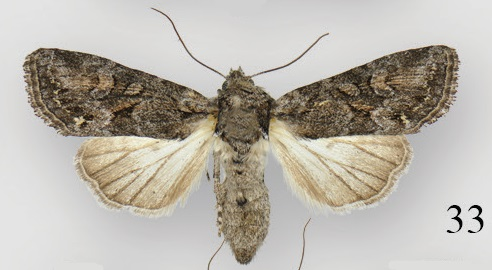
- Female

Scientific classification
- Kingdom: Animalia
- Phylum: Arthropoda
- Clade: Pancrustacea
- Class: Insecta
- Order: Lepidoptera
- Superfamily: Noctuoidea
- Family: Noctuidae
- Genus: Lacinipolia
- Species: L. acutipennis

Binomial name
- Lacinipolia acutipennis (Grote, 1874)

Synonyms
- Mamestra acutipennis Grote, 1880; Mamestra doira Strecker, 1898; Mamestra ascula Smith, 1905; Polia pensilis ab. indistincta Strand, 1917; Lacinipolia subalba Mustelin, 2000

= Lacinipolia acutipennis =

Species of moth

Lacinipolia acutipennis is a moth in the family Noctuidae. It is common throughout xeric, low elevation habitats of western North America. The core range includes the dry, western portions of the Great Plains, the Great Basin, and the western intermontane valleys north of the Sonoran zone, from southern Saskatchewan and Alberta southward to northern Arizona and New Mexico.

Adults are similar to Lacinipolia pensilis, but the forewings are more acute and smaller. Also, the brown tones of the medial forewing are more muted giving an overall lower contrast in tone of the medial area with the grey-black antemedial and postmedial areas. The white spot in the anal angle is often more prominent, particularly in females and the forewing apex has a more contrastingly pale diffuse area that usually extends farther towards the reniform. Adults have been recorded on wing from mid-August to late September.

The larvae are probably general feeders and may ascend shrubs to feed.
