= Lacinipolia spiculosa =

Scientific classification
- Kingdom: Animalia
- Phylum: Arthropoda
- Clade: Pancrustacea
- Class: Insecta
- Order: Lepidoptera
- Superfamily: Noctuoidea
- Family: Noctuidae
- Genus: Lacinipolia
- Species: L. spiculosa

Binomial name
- Lacinipolia spiculosa (Grote, 1883)

Species of moth

Lacinipolia spiculosa is a species of cutworm or dart moth in the family Noctuidae. It is found in North America.

The MONA or Hodges number for Lacinipolia spiculosa is 10400.
