= Anhimella perbrunnea =

Scientific classification
- Kingdom: Animalia
- Phylum: Arthropoda
- Class: Insecta
- Order: Lepidoptera
- Superfamily: Noctuoidea
- Family: Noctuidae
- Genus: Anhimella
- Species: A. perbrunnea

Binomial name
- Anhimella perbrunnea (Grote, 1879)

Species of moth

Anhimella perbrunnea is a species of cutworm or dart moth in the family Noctuidae. It is found in North America.

The MONA or Hodges number for Anhimella perbrunnea is 10529.
