= Anhimella pacifica =

Scientific classification
- Domain: Eukaryota
- Kingdom: Animalia
- Phylum: Arthropoda
- Class: Insecta
- Order: Lepidoptera
- Superfamily: Noctuoidea
- Family: Noctuidae
- Genus: Anhimella
- Species: A. pacifica

Binomial name
- Anhimella pacifica McDunnough, 1943

Species of moth

Anhimella pacifica is a species of cutworm or dart moth in the family Noctuidae. It is found in North America.

The MONA or Hodges number for Anhimella pacifica is 10531.
