= Homorthodes dubia =

Scientific classification
- Domain: Eukaryota
- Kingdom: Animalia
- Phylum: Arthropoda
- Class: Insecta
- Order: Lepidoptera
- Superfamily: Noctuoidea
- Family: Noctuidae
- Genus: Homorthodes
- Species: H. dubia

Binomial name
- Homorthodes dubia (Barnes & McDunnough, 1912)

Species of moth

Homorthodes dubia is a species of cutworm or dart moth in the family Noctuidae. It was described by William Barnes and James Halliday McDunnough in 1912 and is found in North America.

The MONA or Hodges number for Homorthodes dubia is 10536.
