= Lacinipolia anguina =

Scientific classification
- Kingdom: Animalia
- Phylum: Arthropoda
- Clade: Pancrustacea
- Class: Insecta
- Order: Lepidoptera
- Superfamily: Noctuoidea
- Family: Noctuidae
- Genus: Lacinipolia
- Species: L. anguina

Binomial name
- Lacinipolia anguina (Grote, 1881)

Species of moth

Lacinipolia anguina, the snaky arches, is a species of cutworm or dart moth in the family Noctuidae. It is found in North America.

The MONA or Hodges number for Lacinipolia anguina is 10372.
