= Lacinipolia rodora =

Scientific classification
- Kingdom: Animalia
- Phylum: Arthropoda
- Clade: Pancrustacea
- Class: Insecta
- Order: Lepidoptera
- Superfamily: Noctuoidea
- Family: Noctuidae
- Genus: Lacinipolia
- Species: L. rodora

Binomial name
- Lacinipolia rodora (Dyar, 1911)

Species of moth

Lacinipolia rodora is a species of cutworm or dart moth in the family Noctuidae.

The MONA or Hodges number for Lacinipolia rodora is 10406.7.
