= Zosteropoda clementei =

Scientific classification
- Domain: Eukaryota
- Kingdom: Animalia
- Phylum: Arthropoda
- Class: Insecta
- Order: Lepidoptera
- Superfamily: Noctuoidea
- Family: Noctuidae
- Genus: Zosteropoda
- Species: Z. clementei

Binomial name
- Zosteropoda clementei Meadows, 1942

Species of moth

Zosteropoda clementei is a moth of the family Noctuidae. It is found in California on the Channel Islands, including San Clemente, Santa Cruz, and Santa Rosa.
