= Neleucania patricia =

Scientific classification
- Kingdom: Animalia
- Phylum: Arthropoda
- Class: Insecta
- Order: Lepidoptera
- Superfamily: Noctuoidea
- Family: Noctuidae
- Genus: Neleucania
- Species: N. patricia

Binomial name
- Neleucania patricia (Grote, 1880)

Species of moth

Neleucania patricia is a species of cutworm or dart moth in the family Noctuidae. It is found in North America.

The MONA or Hodges number for Neleucania patricia is 10610.
