= Lacinipolia lustralis =

Scientific classification
- Kingdom: Animalia
- Phylum: Arthropoda
- Clade: Pancrustacea
- Class: Insecta
- Order: Lepidoptera
- Superfamily: Noctuoidea
- Family: Noctuidae
- Genus: Lacinipolia
- Species: L. lustralis

Binomial name
- Lacinipolia lustralis (Grote, 1875)

Synonyms
- Lacinipolia selama (Strecker, 1898)

Species of moth

Lacinipolia lustralis is a species of cutworm or dart moth in the family Noctuidae. It is found in North America.
