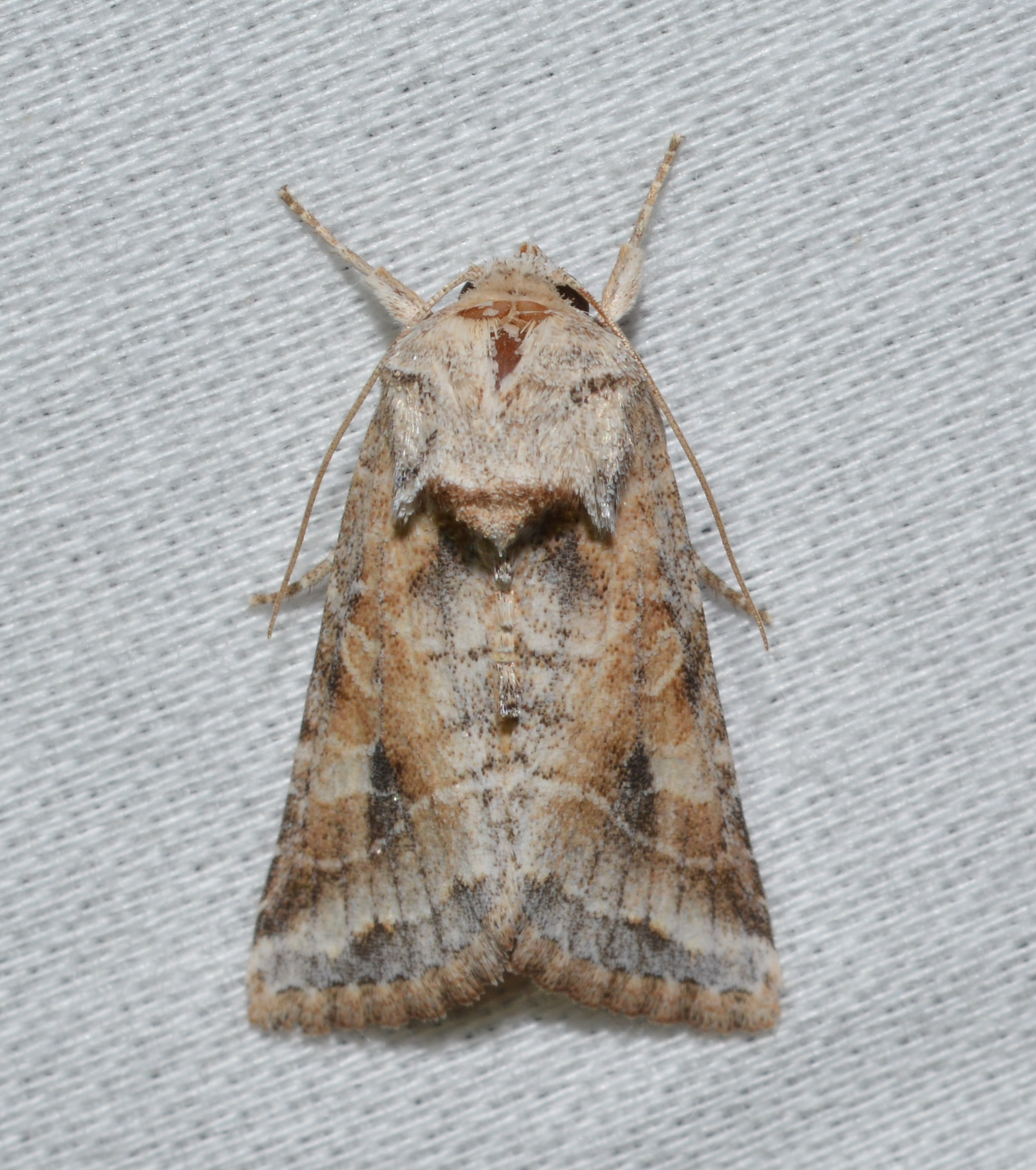

Scientific classification
- Kingdom: Animalia
- Phylum: Arthropoda
- Clade: Pancrustacea
- Class: Insecta
- Order: Lepidoptera
- Superfamily: Noctuoidea
- Family: Noctuidae
- Genus: Lacinipolia
- Species: L. triplehorni

Binomial name
- Lacinipolia triplehorni Selman & Leuschner, 2001

= Lacinipolia triplehorni =

Species of moth

Lacinipolia triplehorni is a species of cutworm (also called dart moths) in the family Noctuidae. It is found in North America.

The MONA (Moths of North America) or Hodges number for Lacinipolia triplehorni is 10403.1.
