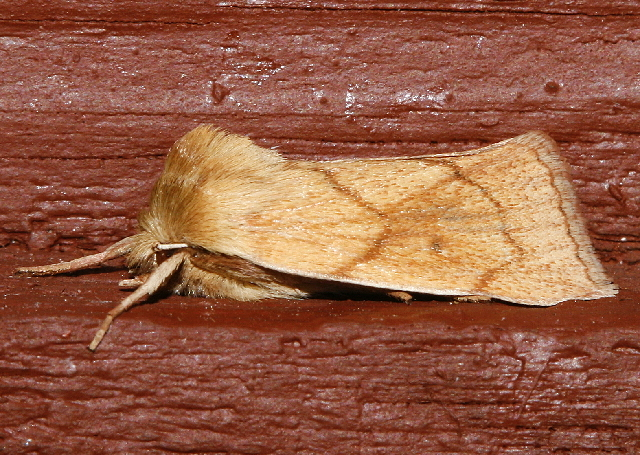

Scientific classification
- Domain: Eukaryota
- Kingdom: Animalia
- Phylum: Arthropoda
- Class: Insecta
- Order: Lepidoptera
- Superfamily: Noctuoidea
- Family: Noctuidae
- Genus: Zosteropoda
- Species: Z. hirtipes

Binomial name
- Zosteropoda hirtipes Grote, 1874

= Zosteropoda hirtipes =

Species of moth

Zosteropoda hirtipes, the V-lined Quaker moth is a moth of the family Noctuidae first described by Augustus Radcliffe Grote in 1874. It is found from the wet Pacific coast forests of North America east to the Rocky Mountains.

The wingspan is about 27 mm.

The larvae feed on Salix, Alnus, Hypochaeris radicata, Trifolium and Aster.
