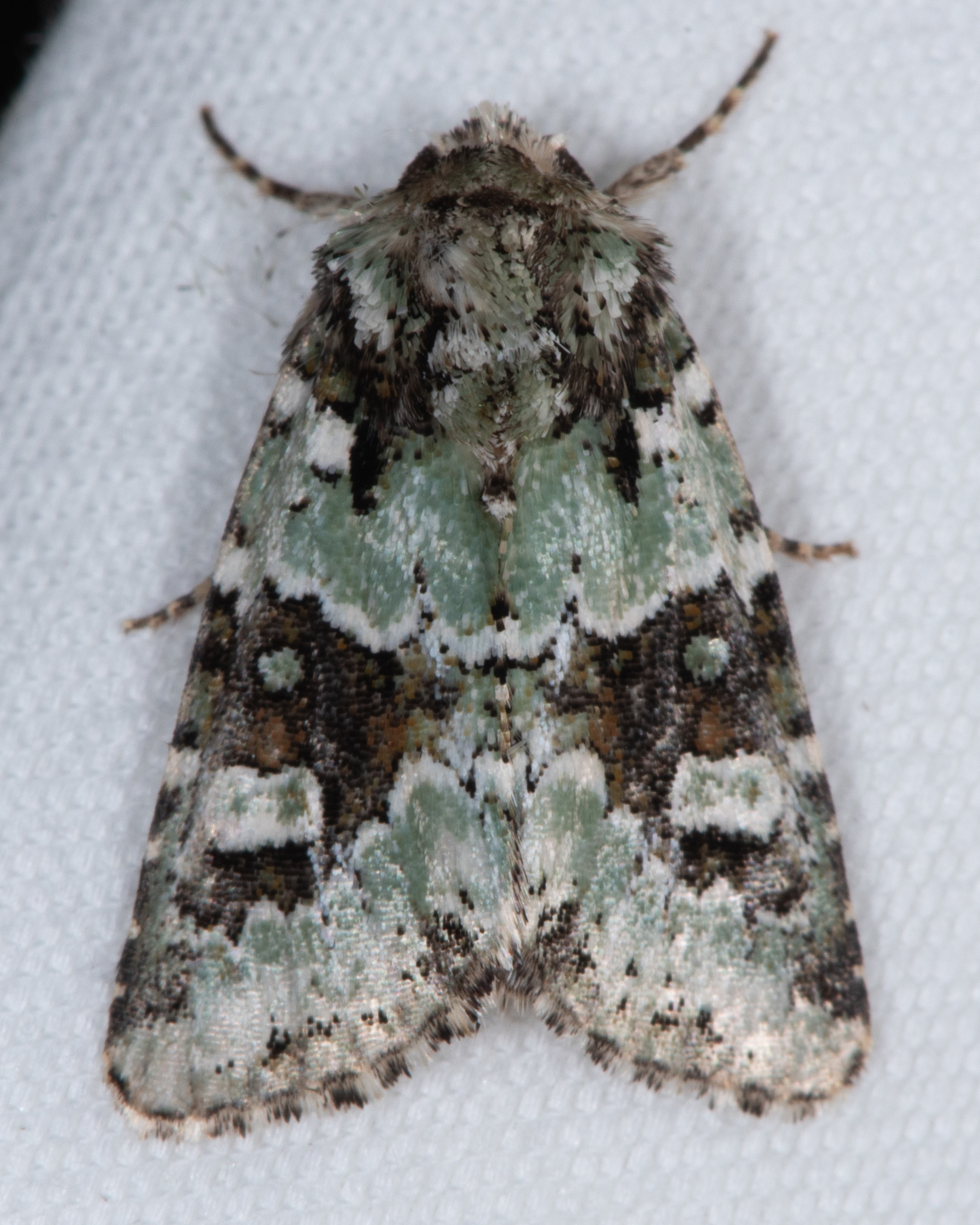

Scientific classification
- Kingdom: Animalia
- Phylum: Arthropoda
- Clade: Pancrustacea
- Class: Insecta
- Order: Lepidoptera
- Superfamily: Noctuoidea
- Family: Noctuidae
- Genus: Lacinipolia
- Species: L. strigicollis

Binomial name
- Lacinipolia strigicollis (Wallengren, 1860)

Synonyms
- Lacinipolia illaudabilis (Grote, 1875)

= Lacinipolia strigicollis =

Species of moth

Lacinipolia strigicollis, the collared arches moth, is a species of cutworm or dart moth in the family Noctuidae. It is found in North America.

The MONA or Hodges number for Lacinipolia strigicollis is 10415.
