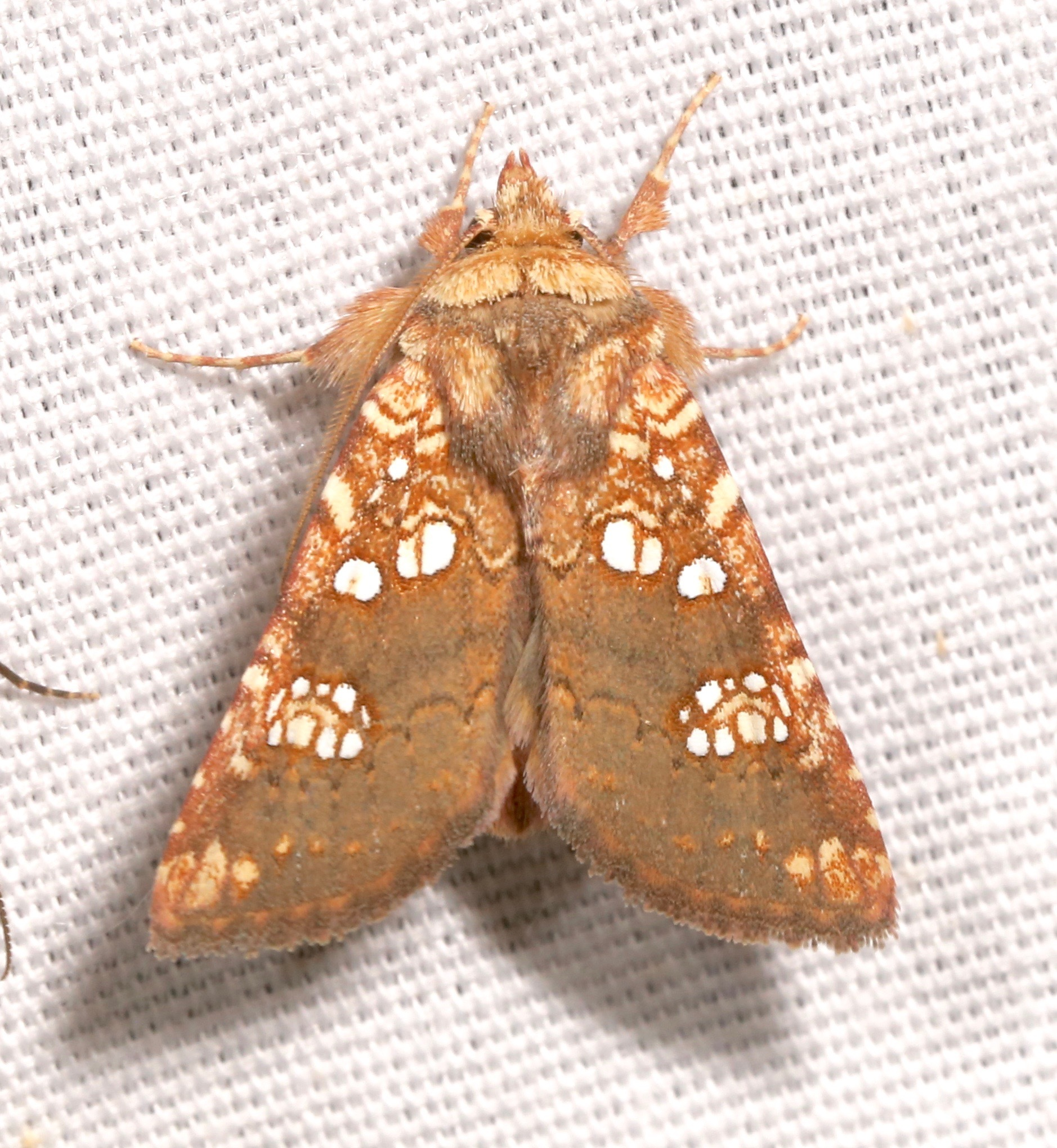

Scientific classification
- Kingdom: Animalia
- Phylum: Arthropoda
- Class: Insecta
- Order: Lepidoptera
- Superfamily: Noctuoidea
- Family: Noctuidae
- Genus: Hydroeciodes
- Species: H. serrata

Binomial name
- Hydroeciodes serrata (Grote, 1880)

= Hydroeciodes serrata =

Species of moth

Hydroeciodes serrata is a species of cutworm or dart moth in the family Noctuidae. It is found in North America.
