= Homorthodes perturba =

Scientific classification
- Domain: Eukaryota
- Kingdom: Animalia
- Phylum: Arthropoda
- Class: Insecta
- Order: Lepidoptera
- Superfamily: Noctuoidea
- Family: Noctuidae
- Genus: Homorthodes
- Species: H. perturba

Binomial name
- Homorthodes perturba McDunnough, 1943

Species of moth

Homorthodes perturba is a species of cutworm or dart moth in the family Noctuidae. It is found in North America.

The MONA or Hodges number for Homorthodes perturba is 10544.
