= Lacinipolia mimula =

Scientific classification
- Kingdom: Animalia
- Phylum: Arthropoda
- Clade: Pancrustacea
- Class: Insecta
- Order: Lepidoptera
- Superfamily: Noctuoidea
- Family: Noctuidae
- Genus: Lacinipolia
- Species: L. mimula

Binomial name
- Lacinipolia mimula (Grote, 1883)

Species of moth

Lacinipolia mimula is a species of cutworm or dart moth in the family Noctuidae.

The MONA or Hodges number for Lacinipolia mimula is 10351.
