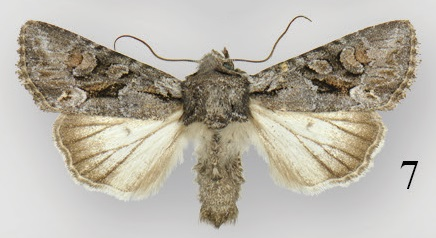
- Male
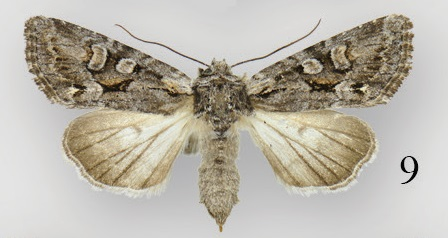
- Female

Scientific classification
- Kingdom: Animalia
- Phylum: Arthropoda
- Clade: Pancrustacea
- Class: Insecta
- Order: Lepidoptera
- Superfamily: Noctuoidea
- Family: Noctuidae
- Genus: Lacinipolia
- Species: L. sareta

Binomial name
- Lacinipolia sareta (Smith, 1906)

Synonyms
- Mamestra sareta Smith, 1906

= Lacinipolia sareta =

Species of moth

Lacinipolia sareta is a moth in the family Noctuidae. It is found throughout western North America, from the southern Yukon and the Northwest Territories to Texas, Arizona and California. It probably also occurs in northern Mexico. It ranges eastward across the southern boreal region to at least Quebec.

Adults are similar to Lacinipolia dimocki, but are smaller and have duller white hindwings. Adults have been recorded on wing from June to July and again from late September to October in Arizona, New Mexico and Texas.

The larvae are ground dwelling and polyphagous.
