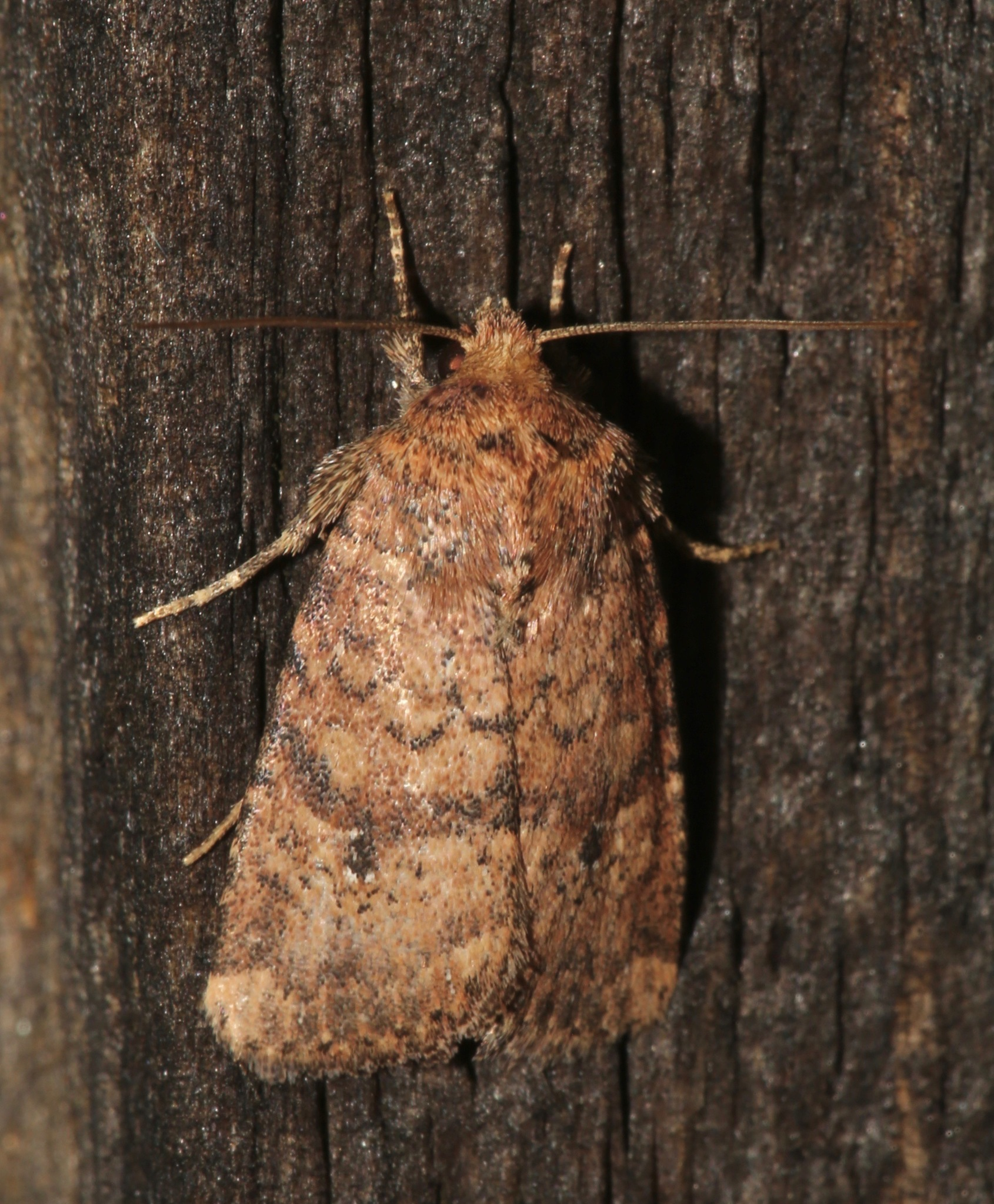
- Northern Scurfy Quaker (Homorthodes furfurata), Windham County, US-VT, US

Scientific classification
- Kingdom: Animalia
- Phylum: Arthropoda
- Clade: Pancrustacea
- Class: Insecta
- Order: Lepidoptera
- Superfamily: Noctuoidea
- Family: Noctuidae
- Genus: Homorthodes
- Species: H. furfurata

Binomial name
- Homorthodes furfurata (Grote, 1874)

Synonyms
- Himella furfurata Grote, 1874; Taeniocampa peredia Grote, 1883; Eriopyga lindseyi Benjamin, 1922

= Homorthodes furfurata =

Species of moth

Homorthodes furfurata, the northern scurfy Quaker moth or scurfy Quaker moth, is a species of moth in the family Noctuidae (owlet moths). It was described by Augustus Radcliffe Grote in 1874 and is found in forest habitats in North America. Its range extends across the continent, to south-eastern Canada, Massachusetts, New York, and Mississippi. In the west it ranges south to California, Arizona, New Mexico and Texas.

The wingspan is about 25 mm. Adults are on wing in summer.

The larvae feed on various hardwood species, including maples Acer and Prunus species, as well as Oemleria cerasiformis.

The MONA or Hodges number for Homorthodes furfurata is 10532.

== Subspecies ==
- Homorthodes furfurata furfurata
- Homorthodes furfurata lindseyi (Benjamin, 1922) New Jersey
