= Engelhardtia ursina =

Scientific classification
- Kingdom: Animalia
- Phylum: Arthropoda
- Clade: Pancrustacea
- Class: Insecta
- Order: Lepidoptera
- Superfamily: Noctuoidea
- Family: Noctuidae
- Subfamily: Noctuinae
- Tribe: Eriopygini
- Genus: Engelhardtia; Barnes & Benjamin, 1923
- Species: E. ursina

Binomial name
- Engelhardtia ursina (Smith, 1898)

Species of moth

Engelhardtia ursina is the only species in the monotypic moth genus Engelhardtia of the family Noctuidae. The genus was erected by William Barnes and Foster Hendrickson Benjamin in 1923 and the species was first described by John B. Smith in 1898. It is known from the US state of Colorado.
