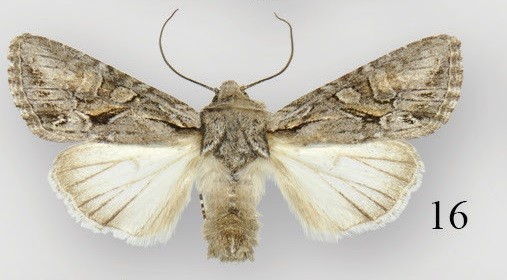
- Male
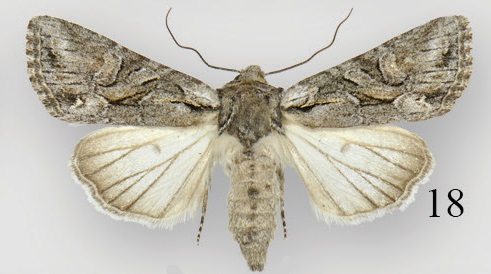
- Female

Scientific classification
- Kingdom: Animalia
- Phylum: Arthropoda
- Clade: Pancrustacea
- Class: Insecta
- Order: Lepidoptera
- Superfamily: Noctuoidea
- Family: Noctuidae
- Genus: Lacinipolia
- Species: L. dimocki

Binomial name
- Lacinipolia dimocki Schmidt, 2015

= Lacinipolia dimocki =

Species of moth

Lacinipolia dimocki is a moth in the family Noctuidae. It is found on the eastern slope of the Washington Coast Ranges to southern California.

The length of the forewings is 14.2–15.8 mm for males and 13.8–16.9 mm for females. The forewing ground colour is pale grey, with the medial area pale grey brown. The antemedial and postmedial lines are incomplete or absent, when present then best developed toward the anal margin and fading out towards the costa, the antemedial line double, sometimes with slightly paler grey infill. The postmedial line double, often forming pale, indistinct crescent opposite claviform spot. The subterminal area with diffuse dark shading in subapical and anal areas, latter sometimes with a small white crescent. The basal dash is black and crisp and the orbicular spot slightly oblong to slightly kidney shaped, with an incomplete, thin black border and the interior slightly paler than the ground colour. The reniform spot with incomplete thin black border, the interior slightly paler than the ground colour, with indistinct, darker inner ring. The male hindwings are bright, slightly pearlescent white with the terminal third of the veins, and thin diffuse margin fuscous. The female hindwings are duller white overall with more extensive fuscous shading on the veins and marginal area. Adults have been recorded on wing from mid-August to late September.

The larvae are probably ground-dwelling and polyphagous on herbaceous plants.

== Etymology ==
The species is named in honour of Thomas E. Dimock for his contributions to the knowledge of southern California moths.
