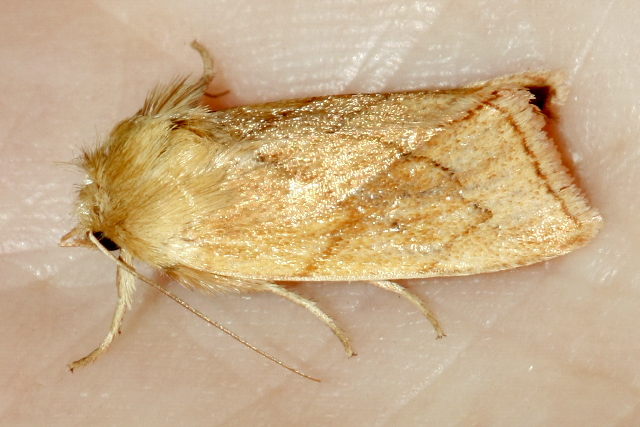
- Zosteropoda hirtipes

Scientific classification
- Kingdom: Animalia
- Phylum: Arthropoda
- Class: Insecta
- Order: Lepidoptera
- Superfamily: Noctuoidea
- Family: Noctuidae
- Genus: Zosteropoda; Grote, 1874

= Zosteropoda =

Genus of moths

Zosteropoda is a genus of moths of the family Noctuidae.

== Species ==
- Zosteropoda clementei Meadows, 1942
- Zosteropoda elevata Draudt, 1924
- Zosteropoda hirtipes Grote, 1874
