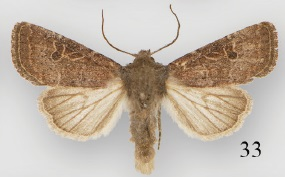

Scientific classification
- Kingdom: Animalia
- Phylum: Arthropoda
- Clade: Pancrustacea
- Class: Insecta
- Order: Lepidoptera
- Superfamily: Noctuoidea
- Family: Noctuidae
- Subfamily: Noctuinae
- Tribe: Eriopygini

Genera
- See text

= Eriopygini =

Tribe of moths

The Eriopygini are a small-sized tribe of moths in the Noctuinae subfamily. It was formerly placed in the Hadeninae subfamily.

== Selected genera ==
- Anhimella
- Anhypotrix
- Engelhardtia
- Fergusonix
- Hexorthodes
- Homorthodes
- Hydroeciodes
- Hypotrix
- Lacinipolia
- Lasionycta
- Marilopteryx
- Miodera
- Neleucania
- Nudorthodes
- Orthodes
- Protorthodes
- Psammopolia
- Pseudorthodes
- Tricholita
- Ulolonche
- Zosteropoda
