= List of moths of Canada (Noctuidae) =

Partial list of Canadian moths

This is a list of the moths of Family Noctuidae (sensu Kitching & Rawlins, 1999) that are found in Canada. It also acts as an index to the species articles and forms part of the full List of moths of Canada.

Following the species name, there is an abbreviation that indicates the Canadian provinces or territories in which the species can be found.

- Western Canada
  - BC = British Columbia
  - AB = Alberta
  - SK = Saskatchewan
  - MB = Manitoba
  - YT = Yukon
  - NT = Northwest Territories
  - NU = Nunavut
- Eastern Canada
  - ON = Ontario
  - QC = Quebec
  - NB = New Brunswick
  - NS = Nova Scotia
  - PE = Prince Edward Island
  - NF = Newfoundland
  - LB = Labrador

== Subfamily Calpinae ==
- Anomis erosa (Hübner, 1821)-ON, QC, NB, MB
- Anomis flava (Fabricius, 1775)-ON
- Calyptra canadensis (Bethune, 1865)-ON, QC, NB, NS, AB, SK, MB
- Eudocima materna (Linnaeus, 1767)-ON, QC
- Scoliopteryx libatrix (Linnaeus, 1758)-ON, QC, NB, NS, PE, NF, BC, AB, SK, NT, YT, MB

== Subfamily Catocalinae ==
- Alabama argillacea (Hübner, 1823)-ON, QC, NB, NS, MB
- Allotria elonympha (Hübner, 1818)-ON
- Anticarsia gemmatalis Hübner, 1818-ON, QC, NB, NS, MB
- Argyrostrotis anilis (Drury, 1773)-ON, QC, SK
- Ascalapha odorata (Linnaeus, 1758)-ON, QC, NB, NS, NF, BC, AB, SK, MB
- Bulia deducta (Morrison, 1875)-BC, AB, SK
- Caenurgina annexa (Edwards, 1890)-BC, AB
- Caenurgina caerulea (Grote, 1873)-BC
- Caenurgina crassiuscula (Haworth, 1809)-ON, QC, NB, NS, PE, NF, BC, AB, SK, NT, YT, MB
- Caenurgina erechtea (Cramer, 1780)-ON, QC, NS, BC, AB, SK, MB
- Catocala aholibah Strecker, 1874-BC, SK
- Catocala allusa Hulst, 1884-BC
- Catocala amatrix (Hübner, [1813])-ON, QC, NB, NS
- Catocala amica (Hübner, 1818)-ON, QC
- Catocala antinympha (Hübner, 1823)-ON, QC, NB, NS, PE
- Catocala blandula Hulst, 1884-ON, QC, NB, NS, PE, AB, SK, MB
- Catocala briseis Edwards, 1864-ON, QC, NB, NS, NF, BC, AB, SK, MB
- Catocala californica Edwards, 1864-BC
- Catocala cara Guenée, 1852-ON, QC, NB
- Catocala cerogama Guenée, 1852-ON, QC, NB, NS, SK, MB
- Catocala clintoni Grote, 1864-ON, QC, MB
- Catocala coccinata Grote, 1872-ON, QC, NB, NS, SK, MB
- Catocala coelebs Grote, 1874-ON, QC, NB, NS, PE, SK
- Catocala concumbens Walker, [1858]-ON, QC, NB, NS, PE, AB, SK, MB
- Catocala connubialis Guenée, 1852-ON, NB, NS
- Catocala crataegi Saunders, 1876-ON, QC, NB, NS, PE
- Catocala dejecta Strecker, 1880-ON
- Catocala epione (Drury, 1773)-ON, QC
- Catocala faustina Strecker, 1873-BC
- Catocala gracilis Edwards, 1864-ON, QC, NS
- Catocala grynea (Cramer, 1780)-ON, QC
- Catocala habilis Grote, 1872-ON, QC, NS
- Catocala hermia Edwards, 1880-AB, SK, MB
- Catocala ilia (Cramer, 1776)-ON, QC, NB, NS, NF, SK, MB
- Catocala illecta Walker, [1858]-ON
- Catocala innubens Guenée, 1852-ON, QC
- Catocala insolabilis Guenée, 1852-ON
- Catocala judith Strecker, 1874-ON, QC
- Catocala junctura Walker, [1858]-BC, AB, SK
- Catocala lacrymosa Guenée, 1852-ON
- Catocala lineella Grote, 1872-ON, QC
- Catocala luciana Strecker, 1874-AB, SK, MB
- Catocala meskei Grote, 1873-ON, QC, AB, SK, MB
- Catocala micronympha Guenée, 1852-ON, QC, MB
- Catocala mira Grote, 1876-ON, QC, MB
- Catocala nebulosa Edwards, 1864-ON
- Catocala neogama (Smith, 1797)-ON, QC
- Catocala obscura Strecker, 1873-ON, QC
- Catocala palaeogama Guenée, 1852-ON, QC
- Catocala parta Guenée, 1852-ON, QC, NB, NS, AB, SK, MB
- Catocala piatrix Grote, 1864-ON, QC
- Catocala praeclara Grote & Robinson, 1866-ON, QC, NB, NS, AB, SK, MB
- Catocala relicta Walker, [1858]-ON, QC, NB, NS, PE, NF, BC, AB, SK, NT
- Catocala residua Grote, 1874-ON, QC
- Catocala retecta Grote, 1872-ON, QC, MB
- Catocala semirelicta Grote, 1874-ON, QC, NB, NS, PE, BC, AB, SK, MB
- Catocala serena Edwards, 1864-ON
- Catocala similis Edwards, 1864-ON, QC
- Catocala sordida Grote, 1877-ON, QC, NB, NS, PE, SK, MB
- Catocala subnata Grote, 1864-ON, QC, NS
- Catocala ultronia (Hübner, 1823)-ON, QC, NB, NS, PE, BC, AB, SK, MB
- Catocala unijuga Walker, [1858]-ON, QC, NB, NS, PE, NF, BC, AB, SK, MB
- Catocala vidua (Smith, 1797)-ON
- Catocala whitneyi Dodge, 1874-MB
- Celiptera frustulum Guenée, 1852-ON
- Cissusa indiscreta (Edwards, 1886)-BC
- Cissusa spadix (Cramer, 1780)-ON, QC
- Doryodes grandipennis Barnes & McDunnough, 1918-NB, NS
- Drasteria adumbrata (Behr, 1870)-ON, QC, NB, NS, PE, BC, AB, SK, MB
- Drasteria divergens (Behr, 1870)-BC
- Drasteria grandirena (Haworth, 1809)-ON, QC, NS
- Drasteria hastingsii (Edwards, 1878)-BC
- Drasteria howlandi i (Grote, 1865)-BC, SK
- Drasteria hudsonica (Grote & Robinson, 1865)-BC, AB, SK, YT, MB
- Drasteria ochracea (Behr, 1870)-BC
- Drasteria pallescens (Grote & Robinson, 1866)-AB, SK
- Drasteria perplexa (Edwards, 1884)-AB, SK
- Drasteria petricola (Walker, 1858)-BC, AB, SK, NT, YT, MB
- Drasteria sabulosa Edwards, 1881-BC
- Euclidia ardita Franclemont, 1957-BC
- Euclidia cuspidea (Hübner, 1818)-ON, QC, NB, BC, AB, SK, NT, MB
- Euparthenos nubilis (Hübner, 1823)-ON, QC
- Gabara subnivosella Walker, 1866-MB
- Hypocala andremona (Cramer, 1784)-ON
- Hypsoropha hormos Hübner, 1818-QC
- Isogona tenuis (Grote, 1872)-ON
- Ledaea perditalis (Walker, 1859)-ON, QC
- Lesmone detrahens (Walker, 1858)-QC
- Lygephila victoria (Grote, 1874)-BC
- Melipotis indomita (Walker, [1858])-ON
- Melipotis jucunda (Hübner, 1818)-ON, BC, AB, SK, MB
- Melipotis perpendicularis (Guenée, 1852)-MB
- Metalectra discalis (Grote, 1876)-ON, QC
- Metalectra quadrisignata (Walker, [1858])-ON, QC, NB, NS, MB
- Mocis latipes (Guenée, 1852)-ON, QC
- Pangrapta decoralis Hübner, 1818-ON, QC, NB, NS, SK, MB
- Panopoda carneicosta Guenée, 1852-ON
- Panopoda repanda (Walker, [1858])-ON, NB
- Panopoda rufimargo (Hübner, 1818)-ON, QC, NB
- Parallelia bistriaris Hübner, 1818-ON, QC, NB, NS
- Phoberia atomaris Hübner, 1818-ON, QC
- Plusiodonta compressipalpis Guenée, 1852-ON, QC, MB
- Scolecocampa liburna (Geyer, 1837)-ON
- Spiloloma lunilinea Grote, 1873-ON
- Thysania zenobia (Cramer, 1777)-ON, QC, SK
- Zale aeruginosa (Guenée, 1852)-ON, QC, NB, NS, MB
- Zale calycanthata (Smith, 1797)-ON
- Zale curema (Smith, 1908)-ON
- Zale duplicata (Bethune, 1865)-ON, QC, NB, NS, BC, AB, SK, MB
- Zale galbanata (Morrison, 1876)-ON, QC, NB, AB, SK, MB
- Zale helata (Smith, 1908)-ON, QC, NB, MB
- Zale horrida Hübner, 1819-ON, QC, NB, NS, MB
- Zale lunata (Drury, 1773)-ON, QC, NB, NS, BC, MB
- Zale lunifera (Hübner, 1818)-ON, QC, NB
- Zale metatoides McDunnough, 1943-ON, SK, MB
- Zale minerea (Guenée, 1852)-ON, QC, NB, NS, BC, AB, SK, MB
- Zale phaeocapna Franclemont, 1950-ON, QC
- Zale submediana Strand, 1917-ON, QC, SK, MB
- Zale undularis (Drury, 1773)-ON, QC, NB
- Zale unilineata (Grote, 1876)-ON, QC, NB, MB

== Subfamily Euteliinae ==
- Eutelia pulcherrimus (Grote, 1865)-ON
- Marathyssa basalis Walker, 1865-ON, QC
- Marathyssa inficita (Walker, 1865)-ON, QC, NB, NS, BC, MB
- Paectes abrostolella (Walker, 1866)-ON
- Paectes nubifera Hampson, 1912-QC
- Paectes oculatrix (Guenée, 1852)-ON, QC, NB, NS, SK, MB

== Subfamily Herminiinae ==
- Bleptina caradrinalis Guenée, 1854-ON, QC, NB, NS, BC, AB, SK, MB
- Chytolita morbidalis (Guenée, 1854)-ON, QC, NB, BC
- Chytolita petrealis Grote, 1880-ON, QC, NB, NS, NF, BC, AB, SK, MB
- Idia aemula Hübner, 1814-ON, QC, NB, NS, PE, BC, AB, SK, MB
- Idia americalis (Guenée, 1854)-ON, QC, NB, NS, NF, BC, AB, SK, MB
- Idia denticulalis (Harvey, 1875)-ON, QC, NB
- Idia diminuendis (Barnes & McDunnough, 1918)-ON, QC, NS
- Idia forbesii (French, 1894)-ON, QC
- Idia immaculalis (Hulst, 1886)-AB, SK
- Idia julia (Barnes & McDunnough, 1918)-ON, QC, NS, MB
- Idia laurentii (Smith, 1893)-NS
- Idia lubricalis (Geyer, 1832)-ON, QC, NB, NS, BC, AB, SK, MB
- Idia majoralis (Smith, 1895)-ON, QC
- Idia occidentalis (Smith, 1884)-BC, AB
- Idia rotundalis (Walker, 1866)-ON, QC, NB, NS, MB
- Idia scobialis (Grote, 1880)-ON, QC
- Lascoria ambigualis Walker, 1866-ON, QC
- Macrochilo absorptalis (Walker, 1859)-ON, QC, NB, NS, SK, MB
- Macrochilo bivittata (Grote, 1877)-ON, QC, NB, AB, SK, MB
- Macrochilo litophora (Grote, 1873)-ON, QC
- Macrochilo louisiana (Forbes, 1922)-ON, QC, AB, SK
- Macrochilo orciferalis (Walker, 1859)-ON, QC, NB, NS, SK, MB
- Palthis angulalis (Hübner, 1796)-ON, QC, NB, NS, PE, NF, BC, AB, SK, MB
- Palthis asopialis (Guenée, 1854)-ON
- Phalaenophana pyramusalis (Walker, 1859)-ON, QC, NB, NS, AB, SK, MB
- Phalaenostola eumelusalis (Walker, 1859)-ON, QC, NB, SK, MB
- Phalaenostola hanhami (Smith, 1899)-ON, QC, NB, NS, AB, SK, MB
- Phalaenostola larentioides Grote, 1873-ON, QC, NB
- Phalaenostola metonalis (Walker, 1859)-ON, QC, NB, NS, NF, BC, AB, SK, MB
- Redectis vitrea (Grote, 1878)-ON
- Renia discoloralis Guenée, 1854-ON, QC
- Renia factiosalis (Walker, 1859)-ON, QC
- Renia flavipunctalis (Geyer, 1832)-ON, QC, NB, NS, AB, SK, MB
- Renia sobrialis (Walker, 1859)-ON, QC, NB, NS
- Tetanolita mynesalis (Walker, 1859)-ON, QC
- Tetanolita palligera (Smith, 1884)-BC
- Zanclognatha bryanti Barnes, 1928-BC
- Zanclognatha cruralis (Guenée, 1854)-ON, QC, NB, NS
- Zanclognatha deceptricalis Zeller, 1873-ON, QC, NB, MB
- Zanclognatha inconspicualis (Grote, 1883)-QC, NB
- Zanclognatha jacchusalis (Walker, 1859)-ON, QC, NB
- Zanclognatha laevigata (Grote, 1872)-ON, QC, NB, NS, MB
- Zanclognatha lituralis (Hübner, 1818)-ON, QC, NS
- Zanclognatha lutalba (Smith, 1906)-ON, QC, BC, AB, SK, MB
- Zanclognatha obscuripennis (Grote, 1872)-QC, NB
- Zanclognatha ochreipennis (Grote, 1872)-ON, QC, NB
- Zanclognatha pedipilalis (Guenée, 1854)-ON, QC, NB, NS, AB
- Zanclognatha protumnusalis (Walker, 1859)-ON, QC, NB, NS
- Zanclognatha theralis (Walker, 1859)-ON, QC, NB, NS

== Subfamily Hypeninae ==
- Colobochyla interpuncta (Grote, 1872)-ON, QC
- Hypena abalienalis Walker, 1859-ON, QC, NB, BC, SK, MB
- Hypena atomaria Smith, 1903-ON, QC, BC, AB, SK, MB
- Hypena baltimoralis (Guenée, 1854)-ON, QC, NB, NS
- Hypena bijugalis (Walker, 1859)-ON, QC, NB, NS, NF, BC, AB, SK, MB
- Hypena californica Behr, 1870-ON, BC, AB, SK
- Hypena deceptalis Walker, 1859-ON, QC, NB, AB, SK, MB
- Hypena decorata Smith, 1884-BC
- Hypena edictalis (Walker, 1859)-ON, QC, NB, BC, AB, SK, MB
- Hypena humuli Harris, 1841-ON, QC, NB, NS, BC, AB, SK, MB
- Hypena madefactalis Guenée, 1854-ON, QC
- Hypena manalis Walker, 1859-ON, QC
- Hypena minualis Guenée, 1854-ON, QC, NS
- Hypena modestoides Poole, 1989-BC
- Hypena palparia (Walker, 1861)-ON, QC, NB, NS, BC, AB, SK, MB
- Hypena scabra (Fabricius, 1798)-ON, QC, NB, NS, AB, SK, MB
- Hypena sordidula Grote, 1872-ON, QC, MB
- Lomanaltes eductalis (Walker, 1859)-ON, QC, NB, NS, NF, AB, SK, MB
- Melanomma auricinctaria Grote, 1875-ON, QC
- Mycterophora inexplicata (Walker, [1863])-ON, QC, NB, AB, SK, NT, MB
- Mycterophora longipalpata Hulst, 1896-BC
- Oxycilla malaca (Grote, 1873)-QC
- Phytometra ernestinana (Blanchard, 1840)-ON
- Phytometra rhodarialis (Walker, 1859)-ON
- Rivula propinqualis Guenée, 1854-ON, QC, NB, NS, NF, BC, AB, SK, MB
- Spargaloma sexpunctata Grote, 1873-ON, QC, NB, NS, BC, AB, SK, MB
- Tathorhynchus exsiccata (Lederer, 1855)-ON, SK, MB

== Subfamily Strepsimaninae ==
- Dyspyralis illocata Warren, 1891-ON, QC, NS
- Dyspyralis nigellus (Strecker, 1900)-ON, QC
- Dyspyralis puncticosta (Smith, 1908)-ON, QC
- Hypenodes caducus (Dyar, 1907)-ON, QC
- Hypenodes fractilinea (Smith, 1908)-ON, QC, NB, NS, AB, SK
- Hypenodes franclemonti Ferguson, 1954-ON, NS
- Hypenodes palustris Ferguson, 1954-ON, QC, NS
- Hypenodes sombrus Ferguson, 1954-ON, QC, NS
- Nigetia formosalis Walker, 1866-ON
- Parahypenodes quadralis Barnes & McDunnough, 1918-ON, QC, NS
- Phobolosia anfracta (Edwards, 1881)-BC

== Subfamily Acronictinae ==
- Acronicta afflicta Grote, 1864-ON, QC, NS
- Acronicta albarufa Grote, 1874-ON, MB
- Acronicta americana (Harris, 1841)-ON, QC, NB, NS, PE, NF, AB, SK, MB
- Acronicta clarescens Guenée, 1852-ON, QC, NS
- Acronicta connecta Grote, 1873-ON
- Acronicta cyanescens Guenée, 1852-BC
- Acronicta dactylina Grote, 1874-ON, QC, NB, NS, PE, NF, BC, AB, SK, MB
- Acronicta falcula (Grote, 1877)-MB
- Acronicta fragilis (Guenée, 1852)-ON, QC, NB, NS, NF, BC, AB, SK, MB
- Acronicta funeralis Grote & Robinson, 1866-ON, QC, NB, NS, BC, MB
- Acronicta furcifera Guenée, 1852-ON, QC, NB, NS, PE, BC, AB, SK, MB
- Acronicta grisea Walker, 1856-ON, QC, NB, NS, PE, NF, BC, AB, SK, MB
- Acronicta haesitata (Grote, 1882)-ON, QC, NS
- Acronicta hamamelis Guenée, 1852-ON, QC, NS
- Acronicta hasta Guenée, 1852-ON, BC
- Acronicta impleta Walker, 1856-ON, QC, NB, NS, PE, BC, AB, SK, MB
- Acronicta impressa Walker, 1856-ON, QC, NB, NS, NF, BC, AB, SK, NT, YT, MB
- Acronicta increta Morrison, 1974-ON, QC, NB, NS, SK, MB
- Acronicta innotata Guenée, 1852-ON, QC, NB, NS, NF, BC, AB, SK, MB
- Acronicta interrupta Guenée, 1852-ON, QC, NB, NS, AB, SK, MB
- Acronicta laetifica Smith, 1897-ON, QC, NB, NS
- Acronicta lanceolaria (Grote, 1875)-ON, QC, NB, NS, BC, SK, MB
- Acronicta lepusculina Guenée, 1852-ON, QC, NB, NS, PE, BC, AB, SK, MB
- Acronicta lithospila Grote, 1874-ON, QC, NB, NS
- Acronicta lobeliae Guenée, 1852-QC, NB, NS, SK, MB
- Acronicta longa Guenée, 1852-ON, NB, NF, MB
- Acronicta mansueta Smith, 1897-BC, AB, SK
- Acronicta marmorata Smith, 1897-BC
- Acronicta modica Walker, 1856-ON, QC
- Acronicta morula Grote & Robinson, 1868-ON, QC, NB, NS, PE, SK, MB
- Acronicta noctivaga Grote, 1864-ON, QC, NB, NS, MB
- Acronicta oblinita (Smith, 1797)-ON, QC, NB, NS, NF, BC, AB, SK, MB
- Acronicta ovata Grote, 1873-ON, QC, NS, MB
- Acronicta perdita Grote, 1874-BC
- Acronicta quadrata Grote, 1874-ON, QC, BC, AB, SK, MB
- Acronicta radcliffei (Harvey, 1875)-ON, QC, NB, NS, NF, BC, AB, SK, MB
- Acronicta retardata (Walker, 1861)-ON, QC, NB, NS, PE, MB
- Acronicta rubricoma Guenée, 1852-ON, QC, MB
- Acronicta sperata Grote, 1873-ON, QC, NB, NS, AB, SK, MB
- Acronicta spinigera Guenée, 1852-ON, QC, SK, MB
- Acronicta strigulata Smith, 1897-BC
- Acronicta superans Guenée, 1852-ON, QC, NB, NS, PE, NF, AB, MB
- Acronicta tristis Smith, 1911-ON, QC, NB
- Acronicta tritona (Hübner, 1818)-ON, QC, NB, NS, AB
- Acronicta vinnula (Grote, 1864)-ON, QC, NB, NS
- Acronicta vulpina Guenée, 1852-ON, QC, NB, NS, PE, NF, BC, AB, SK, NT, MB
- Agriopodes fallax (Herrich-Schäffer, 1854)-ON, QC, NB, NS, NF, MB
- Agriopodes geminata (Smith, 1903)-SK, MB
- Harrisimemna trisignata (Walker, 1856)-ON, QC, NB, NS, NF, AB, SK
- Merolonche lupini (Grote, 1873)-QC, NF, BC, AB, YT
- Polygrammate hebraeicum Hübner, 1818-ON
- Simyra insularis (Herrich-Schäffer, 1868)-ON, QC, NB, NS, BC, AB, SK, MB

== Subfamily Bryophilinae ==
- Cryphia cuerva (Barnes, 1907)-BC, AB
- Cryphia olivacea (Smith, 1891)-BC

== Subfamily Pantheinae ==
- Charadra deridens (Guenée, 1852)-ON, QC, NB, NS, PE, BC, SK, MB
- Colocasia flavicornis (Smith, 1884)-ON, QC, NB, NS, SK, MB
- Colocasia propinquilinea (Grote, 1873)-ON, QC, NB, NS, NF, AB, SK, MB
- Panthea acronyctoides (Walker, 1861)-ON, QC, NB, NS, PE, NF, BC, AB, SK, MB
- Panthea gigantea (French, 1890)-BC
- Panthea pallescens synonym of Panthea furcilla Packard, 1864-ON, QC, NB, NS, BC, AB, SK, MB
- Panthea virginarius (Grote, 1880)-ON, BC, AB, SK

== Subfamily Raphiinae ==
- Raphia coloradensis Putnam-Cramer, 1886-BC, AB
- Raphia frater Grote, 1864-ON, QC, NB, NS, PE, NF, BC, AB, SK, MB

== Subfamily Acontiinae ==
- Acontia aprica (Hübner, [1808])-ON, QC
- Acontia areli Strecker, 1898-BC
- Acontia major Smith, 1900-BC
- Acontia terminimaculata (Grote, 1873)-ON, QC
- Conochares arizonae (Edwards, 1878)-BC, AB, SK
- Fruva fasciatella (Grote, 1975)-MB
- Ponometia sutrix (Grote, 1880)-AB, SK
- Spragueia leo (Guenée, 1852)-ON, MB
- Tarachidia binocula (Grote, 1875)-ON, AB, SK, MB
- Tarachidia candefacta (Hübner, 1831)-ON, QC, NS, SK, MB
- Tarachidia erastrioides (Guenée, 1852)-ON, QC, SK
- Tarachidia semiflava (Guenée, 1852)-BC, AB, SK, MB
- Tarachidia tortricina (Zeller, 1872)-ON, BC, AB, SK, MB
- Tarachidia virginalis (Grote, 1881)-SK, MB
- Therasea augustipennis (Grote, 1875)-BC, AB, SK, MB

== Subfamily Agaristinae ==
- Alypia langtoni Couper, 1865-ON, QC, NB, NS, NF, BC, AB, SK, NT, YT, MB
- Alypia octomaculata (Fabricius, 1775)-ON, QC, NF, SK, MB
- Alypia ridingsii Grote, 1865-BC
- Androloma maccullochii (Kirby, 1837)-ON, QC, NF, BC, AB, SK, NT, MB
- Eudryas grata (Fabricius, 1793)-ON, QC
- Eudryas unio (Hübner, [1831])-ON, QC, MB
- Psychomorpha epimenis (Drury, 1782)-ON

== Subfamily Amphipyrinae ==
- Amphipyra glabella (Morrison, 1874)-ON, QC, NB, BC, AB, SK, MB
- Amphipyra pyramidoides Guenée, 1852-ON, QC, NB, NS, NF, BC, AB, SK, MB
- Amphipyra tragopoginis (Clerck, 1759)-ON, QC, NB, NS, PE, NF, BC, AB

== Subfamily Bagisarinae ==
- Bagisara rectifascia (Grote, 1874)-MB

== Subfamily Condicinae ==
- Condica cupentia (Cramer, 1780)-NS
- Condica discistriga (Smith, 1894)-BC, AB, SK
- Condica sutor (Guenée, 1852)-ON, QC, NB, NF
- Condica vecors (Guenée, 1852)-ON, QC, NB
- Condica videns (Guenée, 1852)-ON, QC, AB, SK, MB
- Homophoberia apicosa (Haworth, 1809)-ON, QC, NB, NS, PE, MB
- Homophoberia cristata Morrison, 1875-ON, QC
- Ogdoconta cinereola (Guenée, 1852)-ON, QC, NB, NS, BC, MB
- Perigea xanthioides Guenée, 1852-ON
- Crambodes talidiformis Guenée, 1852-ON, QC, AB, MB
- Leuconycta diphteroides (Guenée, 1852)-ON, QC, NB, NS, SK, MB
- Leuconycta lepidula (Grote, 1874)-ON, QC, NB, NS, AB, SK, MB

== Subfamily Cuculliinae ==
- Cucullia albida (Smith, 1894)-AB, SK, MB
- Cucullia antipoda Strecker, 1878-BC, AB, SK
- Cucullia asteroides Guenée, 1852-ON, QC, NB, NS, NF, SK, MB
- Cucullia convexipennis Grote & Robinson, 1868-ON, QC, NB, NS, SK, MB
- Cucullia dorsalis Smith, 1892-AB
- Cucullia eulepis (Grote, 1876)-BC
- Cucullia florea Guenée, 1852-ON, QC, NB, NS, NF, BC, AB, SK, MB
- Cucullia intermedia Speyer, 1870-ON, QC, NB, NS, PE, NF, BC, AB, SK, MB
- Cucullia luna Morrison, 1875-AB, SK, MB
- Cucullia mcdunnoughi Henne, 1940-BC
- Cucullia montanae Grote, 1882-BC, AB, SK, MB
- Cucullia omissa Dod, 1916-ON, QC, NB, NS, BC, AB, SK, MB
- Cucullia postera Guenée, 1852-ON, QC, NB, NS, BC, AB, SK, MB
- Cucullia pulla Grote, 1881-BC
- Cucullia similaris Smith, 1892-BC, AB
- Cucullia speyeri Lintner, 1874-ON, BC, AB, SK, MB
- Cucullia strigata Smith, 1892-BC, AB
- Adita chionanthi (Smith, 1797)-ON, QC, NB, BC, AB, SK, MB
- Apharetra californiae McDunnough, 1946-BC
- Apharetra dentata (Grote, 1875)-ON, QC, NB, NS, NF, BC, AB, SK, NT, YT, MB
- Behrensia conchiformis Grote, 1875-BC
- Calophasia lunula (Hufnagel, 1766)-ON, QC, NB, BC
- Catabena lineolata Walker, 1865-ON, QC, BC, AB
- Cerapoda stylata Smith, 1893-AB
- Homohadena badistriga (Grote, 1872)-ON, QC, NS, NF, AB, SK, MB
- Homohadena fifia Dyar, 1904-BC
- Homohadena infixa (Walker, 1856)-ON, QC, NB, NF, BC, AB, SK, MB
- Homohadena stabilis Smith, 1895-ON, BC, AB, SK, MB
- Oncocnemis albifasciata Hampson, 1906-BC, AB, SK
- Oncocnemis augustus Harvey, 1875-BC, AB, SK
- Oncocnemis balteata Smith, 1902-SK, MB
- Oncocnemis barnesii Smith, 1899-BC, AB
- Oncocnemis chalybdis Troubridge & Crabo, 1998-BC, AB
- Oncocnemis cibalis Grote, 1880-BC, AB, SK, MB
- Oncocnemis columbia McDunnough, 1922-BC
- Oncocnemis coprocolor Troubridge & Crabo, 1998-BC
- Oncocnemis dunbari (Harvey, 1876)-BC
- Oncocnemis extremis Smith, 1890-BC
- Oncocnemis figurata (Harvey, 1875)-BC
- Oncocnemis glennyi Grote, 1873-BC
- Oncocnemis greyi Troubridge & Crabo, 1998-BC
- Oncocnemis iricolor Smith, 1888-MB
- Oncocnemis lacticollis Smith, 1908-BC
- Oncocnemis lepipoloides McDunnough, 1922-AB, SK
- Oncocnemis levis Grote, 1880-BC, AB, SK
- Oncocnemis mackiei Barnes & Benjamin, 1924-AB, SK
- Oncocnemis major Grote, 1881-BC
- Oncocnemis mus Troubridge & Crabo, 1998-BC
- Oncocnemis occata (Grote, 1875)-BC, AB, SK
- Oncocnemis pallidior Barnes, 1928-BC, AB, SK
- Oncocnemis parvanigra Blackmore, 1923-BC
- Oncocnemis phairi McDunnough, 1927-BC, AB, YT
- Oncocnemis piffardi (Walker, 1862)-ON, QC, NB, NS, AB, SK, MB
- Oncocnemis poliochroa Hampson, 1906-BC, AB, SK, MB
- Oncocnemis pudorata Smith, 1893-BC, AB
- Oncocnemis regina Smith, 1902-AB, SK
- Oncocnemis riparia Morrison, 1875-ON, QC, NB, BC, AB, SK, MB
- Oncocnemis sandaraca Buckett & Bauer, 1967-BC, AB
- Oncocnemis sanina Smith, 1910-AB, SK, MB
- Oncocnemis saundersiana Grote, 1876-ON, AB, MB
- Oncocnemis semicollaris Smith, 1909-BC
- Oncocnemis umbrifascia Smith, 1894-BC
- Oncocnemis viriditincta Smith, 1894-ON, AB, SK, MB
- Oncocnemis youngi McDunnough, 1922-BC
- Pleromelloida bonuscula (Smith, 1898)-BC
- Pleromelloida cinerea (Smith, 1904)-BC
- Pleromelloida conserta (Grote, 1881)-BC, AB, SK
- Pseudacontia crustaria (Morrison, 1875)-AB, SK, MB
- Sympistis funebris (Hübner, [1809])-QC, NF, BC, AB, SK, NT, YT, MB
- Sympistis heliophila (Paykull, 1793)-QC, SK, NU, NT, YT, MB
- Sympistis lapponica (Thunberg, 1791)-QC, NF, BC, NU, NT, YT
- Sympistis wilsoni Barnes & Benjamin, 1924-BC, AB
- Sympistis zetterstedtii (Staudinger, 1857)-ON, QC, NF, BC, AB, NU, NT, YT, MB

== Subfamily Eustrotiinae ==
- Amyna bullula (Grote, 1873)-QC
- Amyna octo (Guenée, 1852)-ON, QC
- Anterastria teratophora (Herrich-Schäffer, [1854])-ON, QC, AB, SK, MB
- Capis curvata Grote, 1882-ON, QC, NB, NS, SK, MB
- Cerma cerintha (Treitschke, 1826)-ON, QC, NB, MB
- Cerma cora Hübner, 1818-ON, QC, NB, NS
- Cobubatha dividua (Grote, 1879)-ON
- Deltote bellicula (Hübner, 1818)-ON, QC, NB, NS, NF, BC, AB, SK, MB
- Hyperstrotia pervertens (Barnes & McDunnough, 1918)-ON, QC, NB, NS
- Hyperstrotia secta (Grote, 1879)-ON, QC
- Hyperstrotia villificans (Barnes & McDunnough, 1918)-ON, QC
- Lithacodia muscosula (Guenée, 1852)-ON, QC, NB, NS, MB
- Lithacodia albidula (Guenée, 1852)-ON, QC, NB, NS, NF, BC, AB, SK, NT, MB
- Maliattha concinnimacula (Guenée, 1852)-ON, QC, NB, NS
- Maliattha synochitis (Grote & Robinson, 1868)-ON, QC, NB, NS, PE, SK, MB
- Pseudeustrotia carneola (Guenée, 1852)-ON, QC, NB, NS, NF, AB, SK, MB

== Subfamily Hadeninae ==
- Achatodes zeae (Harris, 1841)-ON, QC, NB, NS
- Amphipoea americana (Speyer, 1875)-ON, QC, NB, NS, PE, NF, BC, AB, SK, NT, MB
- Amphipoea interoceanica (Smith, 1899)-ON, QC, NS, AB, SK, MB
- Amphipoea velata (Walker, 1865)-ON, QC, NB, NS, PE, NF, SK, MB
- Annaphila danistica Grote, 1873-BC
- Annaphila decia Grote, 1875-BC
- Annaphila diva Grote, 1873-BC
- Apamea acera (Smith, 1900)-BC
- Apamea alia (Guenée, 1852)-ON, QC, NB, NS, NF, BC, AB, SK, NT, YT, MB
- Apamea amputatrix (Fitch, 1857)-ON, QC, NB, NS, PE, NF, BC, AB, SK, NT, MB
- Apamea antennata (Smith, 1891)-BC
- Apamea apamiformis (Guenée, 1852)-ON, QC, NB, NS, MB
- Apamea atriclava (Barnes & McDunnough, 1913)-BC
- Apamea burgessi (Morrison, 1874)-AB
- Apamea cariosa (Guenée, 1852)-ON, QC, NB, AB, MB
- Apamea centralis (Smith, 1891)-BC
- Apamea cinefacta (Grote, 1881)-BC
- Apamea cogitata (Smith, 1891)-ON, QC, NB, NS, PE, NF, BC, AB, SK, NT, MB
- Apamea commoda (Walker, 1857)-ON, QC, NB, NS, NF, BC, AB, SK, NT, YT, MB
- Apamea contradicta (Smith, 1895)-ON, QC, NB, NF, BC, AB, SK
- Apamea cristata (Grote, 1878)-QC, NB
- Apamea cuculliformis (Grote, 1875)-BC
- Apamea devastator (Brace, 1819)-ON, QC, NB, NS, PE, NF, BC, AB, SK, NT, YT, MB
- Apamea dubitans (Walker, 1856)-ON, QC, NB, NS, PE, NF, SK, MB
- Apamea helva (Grote, 1875)-ON, QC, NB, SK, MB
- Apamea impulsa (Guenée, 1852)-ON, QC, NB, NS, NF, BC, AB, SK, MB
- Apamea inebriata Ferguson, 1977-NS
- Apamea inficita (Walker, 1857)-ON, QC, NB, NS, PE, NF, BC, AB, SK, NT, YT, MB
- Apamea inordinata (Morrison, 1875)-ON, QC, NB, NS, BC, AB, SK, MB
- Apamea lignicolora (Guenée, 1852)-ON, QC, NB, NS, PE, BC, AB, SK, MB
- Apamea longula (Grote, 1879)-BC, AB, SK, YT
- Apamea lutosa (Andrews, 1877)-ON, QC, BC, SK, MB
- Apamea maxima (Dyar, 1904)-BC
- Apamea mixta (Grote, 1881)-ON, QC, NB, NS, MB
- Apamea nigrior (Smith, 1891)-ON, QC, NB
- Apamea niveivenosa (Grote, 1879)-ON, QC, NB, NS, PE, BC, AB, SK, NT, MB
- Apamea occidens (Grote, 1878)-BC, AB
- Apamea ophiogramma (Esper, 1793)-ON, QC, NB, BC, MB
- Apamea plutonia (Grote, 1883)-ON, QC, NS, BC, AB, SK, MB
- Apamea remissa (Hübner, [1809])-ON, QC, NB, NS, PE, NF, BC, AB, SK, MB
- Apamea scoparia Mikkola, Mustelin & Lafontaine, 2000-ON, QC, NB, NS, PE, NF, BC, AB, SK, NT, YT, MB
- Apamea sora (Smith, 1903)-BC, AB, SK
- Apamea sordens (Hufnagel, 1766)-ON, QC, NB, NS, PE, NF, BC, AB, SK, MB
- Apamea spaldingi (Smith, 1909)-BC, AB, SK
- Apamea unanimis (Hübner, [1813])-ON, QC, NB
- Apamea unita (Smith, 1904)-AB
- Apamea verbascoides (Guenée, 1852)-ON, QC, NB, NS, NF, SK, MB
- Apamea vulgaris (Grote & Robinson, 1866)-ON, NS
- Apamea vultuosa (Grote, 1875)-ON, QC, NB, NS, NF, BC, AB, SK, MB
- Apamea zeta (Treitschke, 1825)-NF, BC, AB, NU, NT, YT, MB
- Archanara laeta (Morrison, 1875)-ON, QC
- Archanara oblonga (Grote, 1882)-ON, QC, NB, NS, PE, BC, AB, SK, MB
- Archanara subflava (Grote, 1882)-ON, QC, BC, AB, SK, MB
- Benjaminiola colorada (Smith, 1900)-BC
- Celaena reniformis (Grote, 1874)-ON, QC, NB, NS, PE, NF, BC, AB, SK, MB
- Chortodes basistriga (McDunnough, 1933)-ON, QC, NF, BC, AB, SK, NT, YT, MB
- Chortodes defecta (Grote, 1874)-ON, QC, NB, BC, AB, SK, MB
- Chortodes enervata (Guenée, 1852)-NB, NS
- Chortodes inquinata (Guenée, 1852)-ON, QC, NB, NS, NF, BC, AB, SK, MB
- Chortodes rufostrigata (Packard, 1867)-QC, NB, BC, AB, SK, NT, MB
- Eremobina claudens (Walker, 1857)-ON, QC, NB, NS, NF, BC, AB, SK, NT, YT, MB
- Fagitana littera (Guenée, 1852)-ON, QC, NB, NS
- Hydraecia columbia (Barnes & Benjamin, 1924)-BC
- Hydraecia immanis Guenée, 1852-ON, QC, PE, MB
- Hydraecia micacea (Esper, 1789)-ON, QC, NB, NS, PE, NF
- Hydraecia pallescens Smith, 1899-BC, AB, SK
- Hydraecia perobliqua Hampson, 1910-ON, BC, AB, SK, MB
- Hydraecia stramentosa Guenée, 1852-ON, QC, MB
- Lemmeria digitalis (Grote, 1882)-ON, QC, NB
- Luperina passer (Guenée, 1852)-ON, QC, NB, NS, PE, NF, BC, AB, SK, NT, MB
- Luperina venosa (Smith, 1903)-BC
- Macronoctua onusta Grote, 1874-ON, QC, NB, NS, BC
- Meropleon ambifusca (Newman, 1948)-ON
- Meropleon diversicolor (Morrison, 1874)-ON, QC, NB, NS
- Mesapamea stipata (Morrison, 1875)-ON, QC, NB, NS, PE, SK, MB
- Neoligia albirena Troubridge & Lafontaine, 2002-BC
- Neoligia atlantica Troubridge & Lafontaine, 2002-NS, NF
- Neoligia canadensis Troubridge & Lafontaine, 2002-ON, QC, NB, NS, MB
- Neoligia crytora (Franclemont, 1950)-ON, QC
- Neoligia exhausta (Smith, 1903)-ON, QC, NB
- Neoligia invenusta Troubridge & Lafontaine, 2002-BC
- Neoligia lancea Troubridge & Lafontaine, 2002-BC
- Neoligia lillooet Troubridge & Lafontaine, 2002-BC
- Neoligia subjuncta (Smith, 1898)-ON, QC, NB, NS, BC, AB, SK, NT, MB
- Neoligia tonsa (Grote, 1880)-BC, AB
- Oligia bridghamii (Grote & Robinson, 1866)-ON, QC, NB, NS, NF
- Oligia chlorostigma (Harvey, 1876)-ON
- Oligia egens (Walker, [1857])-ON, AB, SK, MB
- Oligia fractilinea (Grote, 1874)-ON, QC, NB, AB, SK, MB
- Oligia illocata (Walker, 1857)-ON, QC, NB, NS, NF, BC, AB, SK, MB
- Oligia indirecta (Grote, 1875)-BC
- Oligia mactata (Guenée, 1852)-ON, QC, NB, NS, PE, BC, AB, SK, MB
- Oligia minuscula (Morrison, 1875)-ON, QC, NB, NS, NF, MB
- Oligia modica (Guenée, 1852)-ON, QC, NB, NS, NF, BC, SK, MB
- Oligia obtusa (Smith, 1902)-ON, BC, SK, MB
- Oligia rampartensis Barnes & Benjamin, 1923-BC, AB
- Oligia strigilis (Grote, 1875)-QC
- Oligia tusa (Grote, 1878)-BC
- Oligia violacea (Grote, 1881)-BC
- Ommatostola lintneri (Grote, 1873)-NS
- Papaipema aerata (Lyman, 1901)-QC
- Papaipema appassionata (Harvey, 1876)-ON, QC, NB, NS
- Papaipema arctivorens Hampson, 1910-ON, QC
- Papaipema aweme (Lyman, 1908)-ON, MB
- Papaipema baptisiae (Bird, 1902)-ON, QC
- Papaipema birdi (Dyar, 1908)-ON, QC, AB, SK, MB
- Papaipema cataphracta (Grote, 1864)-ON, QC, SK, MB
- Papaipema cerina (Grote, 1874)-ON, MB
- Papaipema cerussata (Grote, 1864)-ON
- Papaipema circumlucens (Smith, 1899)-SK, MB
- Papaipema eupatorii (Lyman, 1905)-QC, NB, NS, MB
- Papaipema furcata (Smith, 1899)-ON, QC, MB
- Papaipema harrisii (Grote, 1881)-QC, NB, AB, SK, MB
- Papaipema impecuniosa (Grote, 1881)-ON, QC, NB, NS
- Papaipema inquaesita (Grote & Robinson, 1868)-ON, QC, NB, NS
- Papaipema insulidens (Bird, 1902)-BC
- Papaipema leucostigma (Harris, 1841)-ON, QC, NB, SK, MB
- Papaipema lysimachiae Bird, 1914-ON, QC, NB
- Papaipema nebris (Guenée, 1852)-ON, QC, NB, MB
- Papaipema necopina (Grote, 1876)-ON
- Papaipema nelita (Strecker, 1898)-ON, QC, NB, NS, MB
- Papaipema nepheleptena (Dyar, 1908)-ON, QC, NB, NS
- Papaipema pertincta Dyar, 1920-BC
- Papaipema pterisii Bird, 1907-ON, QC, NB, NS, NF, MB
- Papaipema rigida (Grote, 1877)-QC, NB, MB
- Papaipema speciosissima (Grote & Robinson, 1868)-ON, QC
- Papaipema unimoda (Smith, 1894)-ON, QC, NB, NS, NF, AB, SK, MB
- Parastichtis suspecta (Hübner, 1817)-ON, QC, NB, NS, NF, BC, AB, SK, NT, YT, MB
- Rhizedra lutosa (Hübner, [1803])-ON, NB
- Spartiniphaga includens (Walker, [1858])-ON, QC, NS, AB, SK, MB
- Spartiniphaga inops (Grote, 1881)-QC, NB, NS, PE, AB, SK, MB
- Spartiniphaga panatela (Smith, 1904)-ON, QC, NB, NS, AB, SK, MB
- Xylomoia chagnoni Barnes & McDunnough, 1917-ON, QC, NB, SK, MB
- Xylomoia didonea (Smith, 1894)-AB
- Acopa perpallida Grote, 1878-BC, AB, SK
- Andropolia aedon (Grote, 1880)-BC, AB
- Andropolia contacta (Walker, 1856)-ON, QC, NB, NS, NF, BC, AB, SK, NT, YT, MB
- Andropolia diversilineata (Grote, 1877)-BC
- Andropolia theodori (Grote, 1878)-BC
- Aseptis adnixa (Grote, 1880)-BC
- Aseptis binotata (Walker, 1865)-BC, AB
- Aseptis characta (Grote, 1880)-BC, AB, SK, MB
- Aseptis fumosa (Grote, 1879)-BC
- Balsa labecula (Grote, 1880)-ON, QC, NB, MB
- Balsa malana (Fitch, 1856)-ON, QC, NB, NS, SK
- Balsa tristrigella (Walker, 1866)-ON, QC, NB
- Bellura densa (Walker, 1865)-ON
- Bellura gortynoides Walker, 1865-ON, QC, NB, NS, NF, AB, SK
- Bellura obliqua (Walker, 1865)-ON, QC, NB, NS, BC, AB, SK, MB
- Callopistria cordata (Ljungh, 1825)-ON, QC, NB, NS, NF, MB
- Callopistria mollissima (Guenée, 1852)-ON, QC, NB, NS
- Caradrina morpheus (Hufnagel, 1766)-ON, QC, NB, BC
- Chytonix divesta (Grote, 1874)-BC
- Chytonix palliatricula (Guenée, 1852)-ON, QC, NB, NS, BC, AB, SK, MB
- Chytonix sensilis Grote, 1881-ON, QC
- Conservula anodonta (Guenée, 1852)-ON, QC, NB
- Cosmia calami (Harvey, 1876)-ON, QC, NB, NS, SK, MB
- Cosmia elisae Lafontaine & Troubridge, 2003-BC, AB
- Cosmia praeacuta (Smith, 1894)-BC
- Dypterygia rozmani Berio, 1974-ON, QC, NB, NS, SK, MB
- Elaphria alapallida Pogue & Sullivan, 2003-ON, QC, NB, NS, NF, BC, AB, SK, MB
- Elaphria georgei (Moore & Rawson, 1939)-QC, NS
- Elaphria grata Hübner, 1818-ON, QC
- Elaphria versicolor (Grote, 1875)-ON, QC, NB, NS, PE, NF, MB
- Enargia decolor (Walker, 1858)-ON, QC, NB, NS, BC, AB, SK, MB
- Enargia infumata (Grote, 1874)-ON, QC, NB, NS, NF, BC, AB, SK, NT, YT, MB
- Enargia mephisto Franclemont, 1939-ON, QC, NB, AB, SK
- Euplexia benesimilis McDunnough, 1922-ON, QC, NB, NS, NF, BC, AB, SK, MB
- Galgula partita Guenée, 1852-ON, QC, NB, NS, BC
- Hyppa brunneicrista Smith, 1902-QC, NF, BC, AB, MB
- Hyppa contrasta McDunnough, 1946-ON, QC, NB, NS, NF, BC, AB, SK, MB
- Hyppa indistincta Smith, 1894-BC, AB
- Hyppa xylinoides (Guenée, 1852)-ON, QC, NB, NS, PE, MB
- Iodopepla u-album (Guenée, 1852)-ON
- Ipimorpha nanaimo Barnes, 1905-BC
- Ipimorpha pleonectusa Grote, 1873-ON, QC, NB, NS, NF, BC, AB, SK, YT, MB
- Ipimorpha subvexa Grote, 1876-AB
- Ipimorpha viridipallida Barnes & McDunnough, 1916-BC
- Magusa orbifera (Walker, 1857)-ON, QC, NB, NS, MB
- Nedra ramosula (Guenée, 1852)-ON, QC, NB, NS, PE, NF, MB
- Nedra tropicalis (Schaus, 1911)-BC
- Phlogophora iris Guenée, 1852-ON, QC, NB, NS, PE, NF, SK, MB
- Phlogophora periculosa Guenée, 1852-ON, QC, NB, NS, PE, NF, BC, AB, SK, MB
- Platyperigea camina Smith, 1894-BC
- Platyperigea meralis (Morrison, 1875)-ON, BC, AB, SK, MB
- Platyperigea montana (Bremer, 1861)-BC, AB, SK, NT, YT, MB
- Platyperigea multifera (Walker, [1857])-ON, QC, NB, NS, PE, NF, BC, MB
- Properigea albimacula (Barnes & McDunnough, 1912)-BC
- Properigea costa (Barnes & Benjamin, 1923)-ON, QC
- Properigea niveirena (Harvey, 1876)-BC
- Protoperigea anotha (Dyar, 1904)-BC, AB
- Protoperigea posticata (Harvey, 1875)-BC
- Proxenus mendosa McDunnough, 1927-ON, QC, NS, BC, AB, SK, YT, MB
- Proxenus mindara Barnes & McDunnough, 1913-BC
- Proxenus miranda (Grote, 1873)-ON, QC, NB, NS, BC, AB, SK, MB
- Pseudanarta crocea (Edwards, 1875)-BC, AB, SK
- Pseudanarta flava (Grote, 1874)-BC
- Pseudobryomima muscosa (Hampson, 1906)-BC
- Rhizagrotis albalis (Grote, 1878)-AB
- Rhizagrotis cloanthoides (Grote, 1881)-AB
- Spodoptera exigua (Hübner, [1808])-QC, NB, BC, MB
- Spodoptera frugiperda (Smith, 1797)-ON, QC, NB, NS, PE, NF, SK, MB
- Spodoptera ornithogalli (Guenée, 1852)-ON, QC, NB, NS
- Spodoptera praefica (Grote, 1875)-BC, AB
- Trachea delicata (Grote, 1874)-ON, QC, NB, AB, SK, MB
- Zotheca tranquilla Grote, 1874-BC
- Anhimella contrahens (Walker, 1860)-ON, QC, BC, AB, SK, NT, MB
- Anhimella pacifica McDunnough, 1943-BC
- Anhimella perbrunnea (Grote, 1879)-BC
- Homorthodes carneola McDunnough, 1943-BC
- Homorthodes communis (Dyar, 1904)-BC
- Homorthodes discreta (Barnes & McDunnough, 1916)-BC
- Homorthodes fractura (Smith, 1906)-BC
- Homorthodes furfurata (Grote, 1875)-ON, QC, NB, NS, BC, AB, SK, NT, MB
- Homorthodes hanhami (Barnes & McDunnough, 1911)-BC
- Neleucania bicolorata (Grote, 1881)-AB
- Orthodes cynica Guenée, 1852-ON, QC, NB, NS, PE, SK, MB
- Orthodes goodelli (Grote, 1875)-ON, QC, NB, NS, BC, AB, SK, MB
- Orthodes majuscula Herrich-Schäffer, 1868-ON, QC, NB, NS, PE, AB, SK, MB
- Orthodes obscura (Smith, 1888)-ON, QC, BC, AB, SK, YT, MB
- Protorthodes akalus (Strecker, 1898)-AB
- Protorthodes curtica (Smith, 1890)-BC, AB
- Protorthodes incincta (Morrison, 1874)-ON, AB
- Protorthodes oviduca (Guenée, 1852)-ON, QC, NB, NS, NF, BC, AB, SK, MB
- Protorthodes rufula (Grote, 1874)-BC
- Protorthodes utahensis (Smith, 1888)-AB, SK, MB
- Pseudorthodes irrorata (Smith, 1888)-BC
- Pseudorthodes vecors (Guenée, 1852)-ON, QC, NB, NS, NF, MB
- Tricholita notata Strecker, 1898-MB
- Tricholita signata (Walker, 1860)-ON, QC, NB, NS, MB
- Ulolonche culea (Guenée, 1852)-ON, QC
- Ulolonche disticha (Morrison, 1875)-AB
- Ulolonche modesta (Morrison, 1874)-ON, QC
- Ulolonche orbiculata (Smith, 1891)-AB, SK
- Zosteropoda hirtipes Grote, 1874-BC
- Acerra normalis Grote, 1874-BC
- Achatia distincta Hübner, 1813-ON, QC, MB
- Admetovis oxymorus Grote, 1873-BC
- Admetovis similaris Barnes, 1904-BC
- Afotella cylindrica (Grote, 1880)-AB, SK
- Amolita fessa Grote, 1874-ON, QC, NB, NS
- Anarta nigrolunata Packard, 1867-ON, QC, NF, BC, AB, NT, YT, MB
- Cerapteryx graminis (Linnaeus, 1758)-NF
- Coranarta luteola (Grote & Robinson, 1865)-ON, QC, NB, NS, NF, BC, AB, SK, NU, NT, YT, MB
- Coranarta macrostigma (Lafontaine & Mikkola, 1987)-BC, AB, NT, YT
- Crocigrapha normani (Grote, 1874)-ON, QC, NB, NS, AB, SK, MB
- Dargida procinctus (Grote, 1873)-BC, AB, SK, MB
- Discestra alta (Barnes & Benjamin, 1924)-AB
- Discestra columbica (McDunnough, 1930)-BC
- Discestra crotchii (Grote, 1880)-BC, AB, SK, MB
- Discestra farnhami (Grote, 1873)-QC, BC, AB, SK, YT, MB
- Discestra hamata (McDunnough, 1930)-BC, SK
- Discestra montanica (McDunnough, 1930)-BC, AB, SK
- Discestra mutata (Dod, 1913)-BC, AB, SK, MB
- Discestra obesula (Smith, 1904)-AB, SK, MB
- Discestra oregonica (Grote, 1881)-BC
- Discestra trifolii (Hufnagel, 1766)-ON, QC, NB, NS, PE, NF, BC, AB, SK, NT, YT, MB
- Egira alternans (Walker, [1857])-ON, QC, NB
- Egira cognata (Smith, 1894)-BC
- Egira crucialis (Harvey, 1875)-BC, SK
- Egira curialis (Grote, 1873)-BC
- Egira dolosa (Grote, 1880)-ON, QC, NB, NS, PE, BC, AB, SK, NT, MB
- Egira hiemalis (Grote, 1874)-BC
- Egira perlubens (Grote, 1881)-BC
- Egira rubrica (Harvey, 1878)-BC, AB, SK
- Egira simplex (Walker, 1865)-BC
- Egira variabilis (Smith, 1891)-BC, AB
- Escaria homogena McDunnough, 1922-AB, SK
- Faronta diffusa (Walker, 1856)-ON, QC, NB, NS, PE, NF, BC, AB, SK, NT, MB
- Faronta rubripennis (Grote & Robinson, 1870)-ON
- Faronta terrapictalis Buckett, 1969-BC
- Hada sutrina (Grote, 1881)-ON, QC, NB, NF, BC, AB, SK, YT, MB
- Hadena caelestis Troubridge & Crabo, 2002-BC
- Hadena capsularis (Guenée, 1852)-ON, QC, BC, MB
- Hadena circumvadis (Smith, 1902)-AB, SK, MB
- Hadena ectrapela (Smith, 1898)-BC, AB
- Hadena variolata (Smith, 1888)-BC
- Hadenella pergentilis Grote, 1883-BC, AB, SK
- Himella fidelis Grote, 1874-QC
- Lacanobia atlantica (Grote, 1874)-ON, QC, NB, NS, PE, NF, BC, AB, SK, MB
- Lacanobia nevadae (Grote, 1876)-ON, QC, NB, NF, BC, AB, SK, MB
- Lacanobia radix (Walker, [1857])-ON, QC, NB, NS, NF, BC, AB, SK, MB
- Lacanobia subjuncta (Grote & Robinson, 1868)-ON, QC, NB, NS, PE, BC, AB, SK, MB
- Lacinipolia anguina (Grote, 1881)-ON, QC, NB, NS, NF, BC, AB, SK, MB
- Lacinipolia comis (Grote, 1876)-BC
- Lacinipolia cuneata (Grote, 1873)-BC
- Lacinipolia davena (Smith, 1901)-BC, AB
- Lacinipolia implicata McDunnough, 1937-ON
- Lacinipolia longiclava (Smith, 1891)-AB, SK
- Lacinipolia lorea (Guenée, 1852)-ON, QC, NB, NS, PE, NF, BC, AB, SK, NT, MB
- Lacinipolia lustralis (Grote, 1875)-ON, QC, NB, NS, NF, BC, AB, SK, MB
- Lacinipolia meditata (Grote, 1873)-ON, QC, NB, NS, BC, AB, SK, MB
- Lacinipolia olivacea (Morrison, 1874)-ON, QC, NB, NS, PE, NF, BC, AB, SK, NT, YT, MB
- Lacinipolia patalis (Grote, 1873)-BC
- Lacinipolia pensilis (Grote, 1874)-BC, AB
- Lacinipolia rectilinea (Smith, 1888)-BC
- Lacinipolia renigera (Stephens, 1829)-ON, QC, NB, NS, PE, NF, BC, AB, SK, NT, MB
- Lacinipolia stenotis (Hampson, 1905)-BC
- Lacinipolia stricta (Walker, 1865)-BC, AB
- Lacinipolia strigicollis (Wallengren, 1860)-BC, AB
- Lacinipolia vicina (Grote, 1874)-ON, QC, BC, AB, SK, MB
- Lasionycta albinuda (Smith, 1903)-ON, QC, NB, NF
- Lasionycta arietis (Grote, 1879)-BC
- Lasionycta conjugata (Smith, 1899)-BC, AB
- Lasionycta discolor (Smith, 1899)-QC, BC
- Lasionycta impingens (Walker, 1857)-BC, AB, YT
- Lasionycta infuscata (Smith, 1899)-BC, AB
- Lasionycta lagganata (Barnes & Benjamin, 1924)-BC, AB
- Lasionycta leucocycla (Staudinger, 1857)-ON, QC, NF, BC, AB, NU, NT, YT, MB
- Lasionycta luteola (Smith, 1893)-BC, AB, YT
- Lasionycta macleani (McDunnough, 1927)-BC
- Lasionycta mutilata (Smith, 1898)-BC, AB
- Lasionycta perplexa (Smith, 1888)-BC, AB, YT
- Lasionycta phaea (Hampson, 1905)-NU
- Lasionycta phoca (Möschler, 1864)-QC, NF, MB
- Lasionycta poca (Barnes & Benjamin, 1923)-BC, AB
- Lasionycta quadrilunata (Grote, 1874)-BC, YT
- Lasionycta secedens (Walker, [1858])-ON, QC, NF, BC, AB, SK, YT, MB
- Lasionycta skraelingia (Herrich-Schäffer, 1852)-YT
- Lasionycta staudingeri (Aurivillius, 1891)-QC, NU, NT, YT
- Lasionycta subdita (Möschler, 1860)-QC, NF, MB
- Lasionycta subfuscula (Grote, 1874)-BC, AB
- Lasionycta taigata Lafontaine, 1988-QC, NB, NS, NF, BC, AB, YT, MB
- Lasionycta uniformis (Smith, 1893)-QC, BC, AB, YT
- Lasionycta wyatti (Barnes & Benjamin, 1926)-BC
- Leucania adjuta (Grote, 1874)-ON
- Leucania anteoclara Smith, 1902-BC, AB, SK
- Leucania comma (Linnaeus, 1761)-NF
- Leucania commoides Guenée, 1852-ON, QC, NB, NS, PE, NF, BC, AB, SK, MB
- Leucania farcta (Grote, 1881)-BC
- Leucania inermis (Forbes, 1936)-ON, QC, NB, NS, MB
- Leucania insueta Guenée, 1852-ON, QC, NB, NS, PE, NF, BC, AB, SK, YT, MB
- Leucania lapidaria (Grote, 1876)-ON, QC, NB
- Leucania linda Franclemont, 1952-ON
- Leucania linita Guenée, 1852-ON, QC, NB, NS, SK, MB
- Leucania multilinea Walker, 1856-ON, QC, NB, NS, BC, AB, SK, MB
- Leucania oregona Smith, 1902-BC
- Leucania phragmitidicola Guenée, 1852-ON, QC, NB, SK, MB
- Leucania pseudargyria Guenée, 1852-ON, QC, NB, NS, MB
- Leucania ursula (Forbes, 1936)-ON, QC
- Mamestra configurata Walker, 1856-BC, AB, SK, MB
- Mamestra curialis (Smith, 1888)-ON, QC, NB, NS, NF, AB, MB
- Melanchra adjuncta (Guenée, 1852)-ON, QC, NB, NS, PE, NF, BC, AB, SK, MB
- Melanchra assimilis (Morrison, 1874)-ON, QC, NB, NS, PE, BC, AB, SK, MB
- Melanchra picta (Harris, 1841)-ON, QC, NB, NS, NF, BC, AB, SK, MB
- Melanchra pulverulenta (Smith, 1888)-ON, QC, NB, NS, NF, BC, AB, SK, MB
- Morrisonia confusa (Hübner, [1831])-ON, QC, NB, NS
- Morrisonia evicta (Grote, 1873)-ON, QC, NB, NS, AB, SK, MB
- Morrisonia latex (Guenée, 1852)-ON, QC, NB, NS, PE, MB
- Mythimna oxygala (Grote, 1881)-ON, QC, NB, NS, PE, NF, BC, AB, SK, NT, MB
- Mythimna unipuncta (Haworth, 1809)-ON, QC, NB, NS, PE, NF, BC, AB, SK, MB
- Mythimna yukonensis (Hampson, 1911)-YT, BC
- Nephelodes minians Guenée, 1852-ON, QC, NB, NS, PE, NF, BC, AB, SK, NT, MB
- Orthosia alurina (Smith, 1902)-ON, QC
- Orthosia ferrigera (Smith, 1894)-BC
- Orthosia garmani (Grote, 1879)-ON, QC
- Orthosia hibisci (Guenée, 1852)-ON, QC, NB, NS, NF, BC, AB, SK, MB
- Orthosia mys (Dyar, 1903)-BC
- Orthosia pacifica (Harvey, 1874)-BC
- Orthosia praeses (Grote, 1879)-BC
- Orthosia pulchella (Harvey, 1876)-BC
- Orthosia revicta (Morrison, 1876)-ON, QC, NB, NS, NF, BC, AB, SK, MB
- Orthosia rubescens (Walker, 1865)-ON, QC, NB, NS
- Orthosia segregata (Smith, 1893)-ON, QC, BC, AB, SK, MB
- Orthosia transparens (Grote, 1882)-BC
- Papestra biren (Goeze, 1781)-QC, NB, NS, NF, BC, AB, YT
- Papestra brenda (Barnes & McDunnough, 1916)-BC, AB
- Papestra cristifera (Walker, 1858)-ON, QC, NB, NF, BC, AB, SK, NT, YT, MB
- Papestra invalida (Smith, 1891)-BC
- Papestra quadrata (Smith, 1891)-ON, QC, NB, NS, NF, BC, AB, SK, NT, YT, MB
- Polia discalis (Grote, 1877)-BC, AB, SK
- Polia imbrifera (Guenée, 1852)-ON, QC, NB, NS, NF, BC, AB, SK, MB
- Polia nimbosa (Guenée, 1852)-ON, QC, NB, NS, NF, BC, AB, SK, MB
- Polia nugatis (Smith, 1898)-BC, AB, SK
- Polia piniae Buckett & Bauer, 1967-BC, AB
- Polia propodea McCabe, 1980-ON, QC, NB, NF, BC, AB, SK, YT, MB
- Polia purpurissata (Grote, 1864)-ON, QC, NB, NS, BC, AB, SK, NT, YT, MB
- Polia richardsoni (Curtis, 1834)-ON, QC, NF, BC, AB, NU, NT, YT
- Polia rogenhoferi (Möschler, 1870)-ON, QC, NB, NF, BC, AB, SK, YT, MB
- Polia delecta Barnes & McDunnough, 1916-BC
- Polia detracta (Walker, 1857)-ON, QC, NB, NS, BC, AB, SK, MB
- Scotogramma fervida Barnes & McDunnough, 1912-AB, SK
- Scotogramma submarina (Grote, 1883)-AB, SK
- Sideridis artesta (Smith, 1903)-ON, AB, SK, MB
- Sideridis congermana (Morrison, 1874)-ON, QC, NB, NS, MB
- Sideridis fuscolutea (Smith, 1892)-BC, AB
- Sideridis maryx (Guenée, 1852)-ON, QC, NB, NS, PE, NF, BC, AB, SK, MB
- Sideridis rosea (Harvey, 1874)-ON, QC, NB, NS, BC, AB, SK, MB
- Sideridis uscripta (Smith, 1891)-BC, AB
- Spiramater grandis (Guenée, 1852)-ON, QC, NB, NS, BC, AB, SK, MB
- Spiramater lutra (Guenée, 1852)-ON, QC, NB, NS, NF, BC, AB, SK, MB
- Stretchia muricina (Grote, 1876)-BC, AB
- Stretchia plusiaeformis Edwards, 1874-ON, QC, NB, BC, AB, SK
- Tholera americana (Smith, 1894)-BC, AB, SK
- Trichocerapoda oblita (Grote, 1877)-SK
- Trichoclea antica (Smith, 1891)-AB
- Trichoclea decepta Grote, 1883-BC, AB, SK
- Trichoclea edwardsii Smith, 1888-BC
- Trichordestra dodii (Smith, 1904)-BC, AB, SK
- Trichordestra legitima (Grote, 1864)-ON, QC, NB, NS, NF, SK, MB
- Trichordestra lilacina (Harvey, 1874)-ON, QC, NB, NS, PE, NF, BC, AB, SK, MB
- Trichordestra liquida (Grote, 1881)-BC, AB, SK
- Trichordestra rugosa (Morrison, 1875)-ON, QC, NB, NS, NF, AB
- Trichordestra tacoma (Strecker, 1900)-ON, QC, NB, NS, PE, NF, BC, AB, SK, MB
- Phosphila miselioides (Guenée, 1852)-ON, QC, SK, MB
- Agrochola lota (Clerck, 1759)-NF
- Agrochola pulchella (Smith, 1900)-BC
- Agrochola purpurea (Grote, 1874)-BC
- Anathix aggressa (Smith, 1907)-ON, BC, AB, SK, MB
- Anathix puta (Grote & Robinson, 1868)-ON, QC, NB, NS, BC, AB, SK, NT, YT, MB
- Anathix ralla (Grote & Robinson, 1868)-ON, QC, NB
- Brachylomia algens (Grote, 1878)-ON, QC, NB, NS, NF, BC, AB, SK, NT, YT, MB
- Brachylomia discinigra (Walker, 1856)-ON, QC, NB, BC, AB, SK, MB
- Brachylomia populi (Strecker, 1898)-BC, AB
- Brachylomia rectifascia (Smith, 1891)-BC
- Brachylomia thula (Strecker, 1898)-BC
- Chaetaglaea cerata Franclemont, 1943-ON, MB
- Chaetaglaea sericea (Morrison, 1874)-ON, QC, NB, NS
- Chaetaglaea tremula (Harvey, 1875)-ON, QC
- Dryotype opina (Grote, 1878)-BC
- Epidemas melanographa Hampson, 1906-BC, AB
- Epidemas obscurus Smith, 1903-BC, AB
- Epiglaea apiata (Grote, 1874)-ON, QC, NB, NS, NF, BC, SK
- Epiglaea decliva (Grote, 1874)-ON, QC, AB, SK, MB
- Eucirroedia pampina (Guenée, 1852)-ON, QC, NB, NS, PE, BC, AB, SK, MB
- Eupsilia devia (Grote, 1875)-ON, QC, NB, NS, BC, AB, SK, MB
- Eupsilia fringata (Barnes & McDunnough, 1916)-BC
- Eupsilia morrisoni (Grote, 1874)-ON, QC, NB, NS
- Eupsilia sidus (Guenée, 1852)-ON, QC
- Eupsilia tristigmata (Grote, 1877)-ON, QC, NB, NS, BC, AB, SK, MB
- Eupsilia vinulenta (Grote, 1864)-ON, QC, NB, NS, AB, SK, MB
- Fishia discors (Grote, 1881)-BC, AB, SK, MB
- Fishia enthea Grote, 1877-ON, QC, NB, NS, NF, AB, SK, NT, MB
- Fishia instruta Smith, 1910-AB, SK
- Fishia yosemitae (Grote, 1873)-BC, AB
- Hillia iris (Zetterstedt, 1839)-ON, QC, NB, NS, NF, BC, AB, SK, NT, YT, MB
- Hillia maida (Dyar, 1904)-BC, AB
- Homoglaea californica (Smith, 1891)-BC
- Homoglaea carbonaria (Harvey, 1876)-BC, AB, YT
- Homoglaea dives Smith, 1907-BC
- Homoglaea hircina Morrison, 1876-ON, QC, NB, NS, BC, AB, SK, MB
- Litholomia napaea (Morrison, 1874)-ON, QC, NB, NS, NF, BC, AB, SK, MB
- Lithomoia germana (Morrison, 1875)-ON, QC, NB, NS, NF, BC, AB, SK, NT, YT, MB
- Lithophane adipel (Benjamin, 1936)-ON, AB, SK, MB
- Lithophane amanda (Smith, 1900)-ON, QC, NB, NS, NF, BC, AB, SK, NT, MB
- Lithophane antennata (Walker, 1858)-ON, QC, NB, MB
- Lithophane atara (Smith, 1909)-BC
- Lithophane baileyi Grote, 1877-ON, QC, NB, NS, BC, MB
- Lithophane bethunei (Grote & Robinson, 1868)-ON, QC, NB, NS, SK, MB
- Lithophane contenta Grote, 1880-BC
- Lithophane dilatocula (Smith, 1900)-BC
- Lithophane disposita Morrison, 1874-ON, QC, NB, NS, AB, SK, MB
- Lithophane fagina Morrison, 1874-ON, QC, NB, NS, BC, AB, SK, MB
- Lithophane georgii Grote, 1875-ON, QC, NB, NS, NF, BC, AB, SK, MB
- Lithophane grotei Riley, 1882-ON, QC, NB, NS
- Lithophane hemina Grote, 1874-ON, QC, NB
- Lithophane innominata (Smith, 1893)-ON, QC, NB, NS, NF, BC, AB, SK, MB
- Lithophane itata (Smith, 1899)-BC
- Lithophane laticinerea Grote, 1874-ON, QC, NB, NS, SK, MB
- Lithophane lepida Grote, 1878-ON, QC, NB, NS, NF, AB, SK, MB
- Lithophane oriunda Grote, 1874-ON, QC
- Lithophane patefacta (Walker, 1858)-ON, QC, BC
- Lithophane pertorrida (McDunnough, 1942)-BC
- Lithophane petulca Grote, 1874-ON, QC, NB, NS, BC, AB, SK, MB
- Lithophane pexata Grote, 1874-ON, QC, NB, NS, NF, BC, AB, MB
- Lithophane ponderosa Troubridge & Lafontaine, 2003-BC
- Lithophane querquera Grote, 1874-ON
- Lithophane semiusta Grote, 1874-ON, QC, NB
- Lithophane signosa (Walker, 1857)-ON
- Lithophane tepida Grote, 1874-ON, QC, NB, NS, AB, MB
- Lithophane thaxteri Grote, 1874-ON, QC, NB, NS, NF, BC, AB, SK, MB
- Lithophane thujae Webster & Thomas, [2000]-ON, NB
- Lithophane unimoda (Lintner, 1878)-ON, QC, NB, NS, SK, MB
- Mesogona olivata (Harvey, 1874)-BC, AB
- Mesogona subcuprea Crabo & Hammond, [1998]-BC
- Metaxaglaea inulta (Grote, 1874)-ON, QC, NB, NS, PE, MB
- Mniotype ducta (Grote, 1878)-ON, QC, NB, NS, NF, BC, AB, SK, MB
- Mniotype tenera (Smith, 1900)-ON, QC, NB, NF, BC, AB, SK, NT, YT, MB
- Platypolia anceps (Stephens, 1850)-ON, QC, NB, NS, NF, BC, AB, SK, MB
- Platypolia contadina (Smith, 1894)-BC, AB
- Platypolia loda (Strecker, 1898)-BC, AB
- Psectraglaea carnosa (Grote, 1877)-ON, QC, NB
- Pyreferra ceromatica (Grote, 1874)-ON, QC
- Pyreferra citrombra Franclemont, 1941-ON, QC, NB, NS
- Pyreferra hesperidago (Guenée, 1852)-ON, QC, NB, NS
- Pyreferra pettiti (Grote, 1874)-ON, QC
- Sunira bicolorago (Guenée, 1852)-ON, QC, NB, NS, PE, NF, BC, AB, SK, MB
- Sunira decipiens (Grote, 1881)-BC
- Sunira verberata (Smith, 1904)-QC, NB, NS, BC, AB, SK, MB
- Sutyna privata (Walker, 1857)-ON, QC, NB, NS, PE, NF, MB
- Sutyna profundus (Smith, 1900)-ON, QC, BC, AB, SK, MB
- Xanthia tatago Lafontaine & Mikkola, 2003-ON, QC, NB, NS, NF, BC, AB, SK, NT, MB
- Xylena brucei (Smith, 1892)-BC
- Xylena cineritia (Grote, 1875)-ON, QC, NB, NS, NF, BC, AB, SK, MB
- Xylena curvimacula (Morrison, 1874)-ON, QC, NB, NF, BC, AB, SK, MB
- Xylena nupera (Lintner, 1874)-ON, QC, NB, NS, PE, NF, BC, AB, SK, MB
- Xylena thoracica (Putnam-Cramer, 1886)-ON, QC, NB, NS, NF, BC, AB, SK, YT, MB
- Xylotype arcadia Barnes & Benjamin, 1922-ON, QC, NB, NS, PE, NF, BC, AB, SK, MB

== Subfamily Heliothinae ==
- Eutricopis nexilis Morrison, 1875-ON, QC, NB, NS, BC, AB, SK, YT
- Helicoverpa zea (Boddie, 1850)-ON, QC, NB, NS, NF, BC, AB, SK, MB
- Heliocheilus paradoxus Grote, 1865-ON, BC
- Heliothis acesias Felder & Rogenhofer, 1875-ON, AB, SK, MB
- Heliothis borealis (Hampson, 1903)-ON, QC, AB, SK, MB
- Heliothis ononis (Fabricius, 1787)-BC, AB, SK, NT, YT, MB
- Heliothis oregonica (Edwards, 1875)-QC, BC, AB, SK
- Heliothis phloxiphaga Grote & Robinson, 1867-ON, QC, BC, AB, SK, MB
- Heliothis virescens (Fabricius, 1777)-ON
- Melaporphyria immortua Grote, 1874-AB, SK, MB
- Pyrrhia adela Lafontaine & Mikkola, 1996-ON, QC, NF, SK, MB
- Pyrrhia exprimens (Walker, 1857)-ON, QC, NB, NS, NF, BC, AB, SK, MB
- Rhodoecia aurantiago (Guenée, 1852)-ON
- Schinia acutilinea (Grote, 1878)-BC, AB, SK
- Schinia arcigera (Guenée, 1852)-ON, QC, NS, SK, MB
- Schinia avemensis (Dyar, 1904)-MB
- Schinia bimatris (Harvey, 1875)-MB
- Schinia bina (Guenée, 1852)-SK, MB
- Schinia cumatilis (Grote, 1865)-BC, AB, SK, MB
- Schinia florida (Guenée, 1852)-ON, QC, NB, NS, PE, AB, SK, MB
- Schinia gaurae (Smith, 1797)-AB, SK
- Schinia honesta (Grote, 1881)-BC, AB
- Schinia intermontana Hardwick, 1958-BC
- Schinia jaguarina (Guenée, 1852)-AB, SK, MB
- Schinia lucens (Morrison, 1875)-MB
- Schinia lynx (Guenée, 1852)-ON, QC
- Schinia meadi (Grote, 1873)-ON, AB, SK
- Schinia mortua (Grote, 1865)-MB
- Schinia nuchalis (Grote, 1878)-BC, AB, SK
- Schinia nundina (Drury, 1773)-ON, QC, NS
- Schinia obscurata Strecker, 1898-ON, QC
- Schinia persimilis (Grote, 1873)-AB, SK, YT
- Schinia rivulosa (Guenée, 1852)-ON, QC
- Schinia roseitincta (Harvey, 1875)-MB
- Schinia sanguinea (Geyer, 1832)-ON, SK
- Schinia septentrionalis (Walker, 1858)-QC
- Schinia suetus (Grote, 1873)-BC
- Schinia thoreaui (Grote & Robinson, 1870)-ON, MB
- Schinia trifascia Hübner, 1818-ON, QC
- Schinia verna Hardwick, 1983-AB, SK, MB
- Schinia villosa (Grote, 1864)-BC, AB, SK, MB
- Schinia walsinghami (Edwards, 1881)-BC

== Subfamily Noctuinae ==
- Actebia fennica (Tauscher, 1806)-ON, QC, NB, NS, NF, BC, AB, SK, NT, YT, MB
- Agrotis arenarius Neil, 1983-NS
- Agrotis daedalus (Smith, 1890)-AB, SK
- Agrotis gladiaria Morrison, 1874-ON, QC, NS
- Agrotis gravis Grote, 1874-BC
- Agrotis ipsilon (Hufnagel, 1766)-ON, QC, NB, NS, NF, BC, AB, SK, MB
- Agrotis kingi McDunnough, 1932-SK
- Agrotis obliqua (Smith, 1903)-ON, QC, NS, NF, BC, AB, SK, MB
- Agrotis orthogonia Morrison, 1876-AB, SK, MB
- Agrotis robustior (Smith, 1899)-AB, SK, MB
- Agrotis ruta (Eversmann, 1851)-QC, NF, BC, AB, NT, YT, MB
- Agrotis stigmosa Morrison, 1874-ON, QC, AB, SK, MB
- Agrotis subterranea (Fabricius, 1794)-NS
- Agrotis vancouverensis Grote, 1873-BC, AB, SK, YT
- Agrotis venerabilis Walker, [1857]-ON, QC, NB, NS, PE, NF, BC, AB, SK, MB
- Agrotis vetusta (Walker, 1856)-ON, QC, NB, NS, BC, AB, SK, NT, YT, MB
- Agrotis volubilis Harvey, 1874-ON, QC, NB, NS, PE, AB, SK, MB
- Anicla infecta (Ochsenheimer, 1816)-QC, NS
- Copablepharon absidum (Harvey, 1875)-BC
- Copablepharon fuscum Troubridge & Crabo, 1996-BC
- Copablepharon grandis (Strecker, 1878)-AB, SK, MB
- Copablepharon hopfingeri Franclemont, 1954-BC
- Copablepharon longipenne Grote, 1882-AB, SK, MB
- Copablepharon viridisparsa Dod, 1916-AB, SK, MB
- Euagrotis exuberans (Smith, 1898)-BC, AB, SK
- Euagrotis forbesi Franclemont, 1952-ON, QC, NB, NS
- Euagrotis illapsa (Walker, 1857)-ON, QC, NB
- Euagrotis tenuescens (Smith, 1890)-MB
- Euagrotis tepperi (Smith, 1888)-BC, AB, SK, MB
- Eucoptocnemis fimbriaris (Guenée, 1852)-ON
- Euxoa aberrans McDunnough, 1932-BC, AB, SK, MB
- Euxoa adumbrata (Eversmann, 1842)-ON, QC, BC, AB, SK, NT, YT, MB
- Euxoa aequalis (Harvey, 1876)-BC, AB, SK, YT
- Euxoa agema (Strecker, 1899)-BC
- Euxoa albipennis (Grote, 1876)-ON, QC, NS, BC, AB, SK, MB
- Euxoa altens McDunnough, 1946-BC
- Euxoa atomaris (Smith, 1890)-BC, AB
- Euxoa atristrigata (Smith, 1890)-BC, SK
- Euxoa auripennis Lafontaine, 1974-BC, AB, SK, MB
- Euxoa aurulenta (Smith, 1888)-ON, AB, SK, MB
- Euxoa auxiliaris (Grote, 1873)-BC, AB, SK, NU, NT, MB
- Euxoa basalis (Grote, 1879)-AB, SK, NT
- Euxoa bicollaris (Grote, 1878)-BC
- Euxoa biformata Smith, 1910-BC
- Euxoa bochus (Morrison, 1874)-BC, AB
- Euxoa bostoniensis (Grote, 1874)-ON
- Euxoa brevipennis (Smith, 1888)-BC, AB, SK
- Euxoa brunneigera (Grote, 1876)-BC
- Euxoa campestris (Grote, 1875)-ON, QC, NB, NF, BC, AB, SK, YT, MB
- Euxoa castanea Lafontaine, 1981-BC, AB, SK, NT, MB
- Euxoa catenula (Grote, 1879)-BC, AB, SK
- Euxoa chimoensis Hardwick, 1966-QC
- Euxoa choris (Harvey, 1876)-BC, AB, SK, YT
- Euxoa churchillensis (McDunnough, 1932)-ON, NU, NT, MB
- Euxoa cicatricosa (Grote & Robinson, 1865)-BC, AB, SK
- Euxoa cinereopallidus (Smith, 1903)-BC, AB, SK
- Euxoa citricolor (Grote, 1880)-AB
- Euxoa clausa McDunnough, 1923-AB, SK
- Euxoa comosa (Morrison, 1876)-ON, QC, NB, NS, PE, NF, BC, AB, SK, NT, YT, MB
- Euxoa costata (Grote, 1876)-BC
- Euxoa cursoria (Hufnagel, 1766)-AB, NT, YT
- Euxoa dargo (Strecker, 1898)-BC, AB, SK, MB
- Euxoa declarata (Walker, 1865)-ON, QC, NB, NS, PE, BC, AB, SK, YT, MB
- Euxoa detersa (Walker, 1856)-ON, QC, NB, NS, PE, NF, AB, SK, NT, MB
- Euxoa difformis (Smith, 1900)-BC, AB, SK
- Euxoa dissona (Möschler, 1860)-QC, NF, NT, MB
- Euxoa divergens (Walker, [1857])-ON, QC, NB, NS, PE, NF, BC, AB, SK, NT, YT, MB
- Euxoa dodi McDunnough, 1923-AB, SK
- Euxoa edictalis (Smith, 1893)-BC, AB
- Euxoa excogita (Smith, 1900)-BC
- Euxoa extranea (Smith, 1888)-BC
- Euxoa flavicollis (Smith, 1888)-BC, AB, SK, NT, YT, MB
- Euxoa fumalis (Grote, 1873)-ON, QC, NB, NS, PE
- Euxoa furtivus (Smith, 1890)-BC, AB, SK
- Euxoa hollemani (Grote, 1874)-BC
- Euxoa hyperborea Lafontaine, 1987-YT
- Euxoa idahoensis (Grote, 1878)-BC, AB, YT
- Euxoa infausta (Walker, 1865)-BC, AB, SK, NT
- Euxoa infracta (Morrison, 1875)-BC, MB
- Euxoa intermontana Lafontaine, 1975-BC
- Euxoa intrita (Morrison, 1874)-ON, BC, AB, SK, MB
- Euxoa laetificans (Smith, 1894)-BC, AB, SK
- Euxoa lewisi (Grote, 1873)-BC, AB
- Euxoa lillooet McDunnough, 1927-BC
- Euxoa macleani McDunnough, 1927-QC, NF, BC
- Euxoa macrodentata Hardwick, 1965-BC, YT
- Euxoa maimes (Smith, 1903)-BC, AB, SK, NT, YT, MB
- Euxoa manitobana McDunnough, 1925-ON, AB, SK, NT, MB
- Euxoa medialis (Smith, 1888)-AB, SK, MB
- Euxoa messoria (Harris, 1841)-ON, QC, NB, NS, PE, NF, BC, AB, SK, NT, MB
- Euxoa mimallonis (Grote, 1873)-ON, QC, NB, NS, NF, BC, AB, SK, MB
- Euxoa misturata (Smith, 1890)-SK
- Euxoa mitis (Smith, 1894)-BC, AB, SK
- Euxoa moerens (Grote, 1883)-AB, SK
- Euxoa munis (Grote, 1879)-BC, AB, SK, NT, MB
- Euxoa murdocki (Smith, 1890)-BC, AB
- Euxoa nevada (Smith, 1900)-BC, AB, SK
- Euxoa niveilinea (Grote, 1882)-AB, SK
- Euxoa nomas (Erschoff, 1874)-BC, AB, NT, YT
- Euxoa nostra (Smith, 1890)-BC, AB, NT
- Euxoa obeliscoides (Guenée, 1852)-ON, QC, BC, AB, SK, MB
- Euxoa oberfoelli Hardwick, 1973-SK
- Euxoa oblongistigma (Smith, 1888)-BC, AB, SK
- Euxoa ochrogaster (Guenée, 1852)-ON, QC, NB, NS, PE, NF, BC, AB, SK, NT, YT, MB
- Euxoa olivalis (Grote, 1879)-BC, AB, SK, YT
- Euxoa olivia (Morrison, 1876)-BC, AB, SK, MB
- Euxoa pallidimacula Lafontaine, 1987-BC
- Euxoa pallipennis (Smith, 1888)-BC, AB, SK
- Euxoa perexcellens (Grote, 1875)-BC
- Euxoa perolivalis (Smith, 1905)-BC, AB, SK, NT, YT, MB
- Euxoa perpolita (Morrison, 1876)-ON, QC, NB, NS, PE, NF, BC, AB, SK, MB
- Euxoa pestula Smith, 1904-BC, AB, SK, NT, MB
- Euxoa plagigera (Morrison, 1874)-BC, AB, SK, YT
- Euxoa pleuritica (Grote, 1876)-ON, QC, NF, BC, AB, SK, MB
- Euxoa pluralis (Grote, 1878)-BC
- Euxoa punctigera (Walker, 1865)-BC
- Euxoa quadridentata (Grote & Robinson, 1865)-BC, AB, SK, MB
- Euxoa quebecensis (Smith, 1900)-ON, QC, NB, NF, BC, AB, YT
- Euxoa redimicula (Morrison, 1874)-ON, QC, NS, PE, SK, MB
- Euxoa ridingsiana (Grote, 1875)-ON, BC, AB, SK, NT, YT, MB
- Euxoa rockburnei Hardwick, 1973-BC
- Euxoa rufula (Smith, 1888)-BC, AB, YT
- Euxoa satiens (Smith, 1890)-BC
- Euxoa satis (Harvey, 1876)-BC, AB
- Euxoa scandens (Riley, 1869)-ON, QC, NB, NS, PE, NF, AB, SK, NT, MB
- Euxoa scholastica McDunnough, 1920-ON, QC, NS
- Euxoa scotogrammoides McDunnough, 1932-BC
- Euxoa septentrionalis (Walker, 1865)-BC, AB
- Euxoa servitus (Smith, 1895)-ON, QC, NB, NS, PE, BC, AB, SK, YT, MB
- Euxoa setonia McDunnough, 1927-BC, AB
- Euxoa shasta Lafontaine, 1975-QC, BC
- Euxoa siccata (Smith, 1893)-AB
- Euxoa silens (Grote, 1875)-BC, AB
- Euxoa simona McDunnough, 1932-BC, AB
- Euxoa simulata McDunnough, 1946-BC
- Euxoa sinelinea Hardwick, 1965-ON, QC, NF, AB, MB
- Euxoa spumata McDunnough, 1940-AB, SK
- Euxoa subandera Lafontaine, 1987-BC
- Euxoa taura Smith, 1905-AB, SK
- Euxoa teleboa (Smith, 1890)-AB, SK
- Euxoa terrenus (Smith, 1900)-BC, AB
- Euxoa tessellata (Harris, 1841)-ON, QC, NB, NS, PE, NF, BC, AB, SK, YT, MB
- Euxoa tristicula (Morrison, 1876)-QC, NB, NS, BC, AB, SK, MB
- Euxoa tronellus (Smith, 1903)-AB, SK
- Euxoa unica McDunnough, 1940-SK
- Euxoa vallus (Smith, 1900)-BC, AB
- Euxoa velleripennis (Grote, 1874)-ON, QC, NB, NS, PE, MB
- Euxoa vetusta (Walker, 1865)-BC
- Euxoa westermanni (Staudinger, 1857)-QC, NF, BC, AB, NT, YT, MB
- Euxoa wilsoni (Grote, 1873)-BC
- Feltia herilis (Grote, 1873)-ON, QC, NB, NS, PE, BC, AB, SK, MB
- Feltia jaculifera (Guenée, 1852)-ON, QC, NB, NS, PE, BC, AB, SK, NT, YT, MB
- Feltia subgothica (Haworth, 1809)-ON, QC, SK
- Feltia tricosa (Lintner, 1874)-ON, QC, MB
- Onychagrotis rileyana (Morrison, 1874)-AB, SK
- Peridroma saucia (Hübner, [1808])-ON, QC, NB, NS, PE, NF, BC, AB, SK, MB
- Protexarnis balanitis (Grote, 1873)-BC, AB, SK, NT, YT
- Protogygia alberta-SK
- Protogygia enalaga McDunnough, 1932-AB, SK
- Protogygia postera-SK
- Protogygia querula (Dod, 1915)-AB, SK
- Pseudorthosia variabilis Grote, 1874-BC, AB, SK
- Richia acclivis (Morrison, [1876])-ON
- Trichosilia beringiana Lafontaine & Kononenko, 1986-YT
- Trichosilia boreana Lafontaine, 1986-NU, NT, YT
- Trichosilia geniculata (Grote & Robinson, 1868)-ON, QC, NB, NS, PE, MB
- Trichosilia manifesta (Morrison, 1875)-ON
- Trichosilia mollis (Walker, [1857])-ON, QC, NB, NS, NF, BC, AB, SK, NU, NT, YT, MB
- Trichosilia nigrita (Graeser, 1892)-BC, AB, SK, YT, MB
- Trichosilia woodiana Lafontaine, 1986-NT, YT
- Abagrotis alternata (Grote, 1864)-ON, QC, NB, NS, PE, NF, AB, SK, MB
- Abagrotis anchocelioides (Guenée, 1852)-ON, QC, MB
- Abagrotis apposita (Grote, 1878)-BC
- Abagrotis baueri McDunnough, 1949-BC
- Abagrotis brunneipennis (Grote, 1875)-ON, QC, NB, NS, NF, BC, AB, SK, MB
- Abagrotis cupida (Grote, 1865)-ON, QC, NB, NS, PE, NF, BC, AB, SK, MB
- Abagrotis dickeli Lafontaine, 1998-BC
- Abagrotis discoidalis (Grote, 1876)-AB
- Abagrotis dodi McDunnough, 1927-BC, AB, YT
- Abagrotis duanca (Smith, 1908)-BC, AB, SK
- Abagrotis erratica (Smith, 1890)-BC, AB
- Abagrotis forbesi (Benjamin, 1921)-BC
- Abagrotis glenni Buckett, 1968-BC
- Abagrotis hermina Lafontaine, 1998-BC, AB, SK, MB
- Abagrotis mirabilis (Grote, 1879)-BC
- Abagrotis nanalis (Grote, 1881)-BC, AB, SK
- Abagrotis nefascia (Smith, 1908)-BC, AB
- Abagrotis orbis (Grote, 1876)-ON, BC, AB, SK, MB
- Abagrotis placida (Grote, 1876)-ON, QC, NB, NF, BC, AB, SK, NT, YT, MB
- Abagrotis pulchrata (Blackmore, 1925)-BC
- Abagrotis reedi Buckett, 1969-BC, AB, SK, MB
- Abagrotis scopeops (Dyar, 1904)-BC
- Abagrotis trigona (Smith, 1893)-BC, AB, SK, MB
- Abagrotis turbulenta McDunnough, 1927-BC
- Abagrotis variata (Grote, 1876)-BC, AB
- Abagrotis vittifrons (Grote, 1864)-BC, AB, SK
- Adelphagrotis indeterminata (Walker, 1865)-BC
- Adelphagrotis stellaris (Grote, 1880)-BC
- Agnorisma badinodis (Grote, 1874)-ON, QC
- Agnorisma bugrai (Kocak, 1983)-ON, QC, NB, NS, PE, BC, AB, SK, NT, MB
- Anaplectoides prasina ([Denis & Schiffermüller], 1775)-ON, QC, NB, NS, NF, BC, AB, SK, NT, MB
- Anaplectoides pressus (Grote, 1874)-ON, QC, NB, NS, NF, BC, AB, SK, NT, MB
- Aplectoides condita (Guenée, 1852)-ON, QC, NB, NS, NF, BC, AB, SK, MB
- Cerastis enigmatica Lafontaine & Crabo, 1997-BC
- Cerastis fishii (Grote, 1878)-ON, QC, NB, NS, NF
- Cerastis salicarum (Walker, 1857)-ON, QC, NB, NS, NF, BC, AB, SK, NT, MB
- Cerastis tenebrifera (Walker, 1865)-ON, QC, NB, NF
- Chersotis juncta (Grote, 1878)-ON, QC, NB, NF, BC, AB, SK, NT, YT, MB
- Choephora fungorum Grote & Robinson, 1868-ON
- Coenophila opacifrons (Grote, 1878)-ON, QC, NB, NS, PE, NF, BC, AB, SK, MB
- Cryptocala acadiensis (Bethune, 1870)-ON, QC, NB, NS, NF, BC, AB, SK, MB
- Diarsia calgary (Smith, 1898)-BC, AB, SK, YT
- Diarsia dislocata (Smith, 1904)-ON, QC, NB, NF, BC, AB, SK, NT, YT, MB
- Diarsia esurialis (Grote, 1881)-BC
- Diarsia jucunda (Walker, [1857])-ON, QC, NB, NS, NF
- Diarsia rosaria (Grote, 1878)-ON, QC, NB, NS, NF, BC, AB, SK, YT
- Diarsia rubifera (Grote, 1875)-ON, QC, NB, NS, NF, BC, AB, SK, MB
- Eueretagrotis attentus (Grote, 1874)-ON, QC, NB, NS, SK, MB
- Eueretagrotis perattentus (Grote, 1876)-ON, QC, NB, NS, NF, BC, AB, SK, MB
- Eueretagrotis sigmoides (Guenée, 1852)-ON, QC, SK, MB
- Eurois astricta Morrison, 1874-ON, QC, NB, NS, NF, BC, AB, SK, NT, YT, MB
- Eurois nigra (Smith, 1892)-BC, AB, YT
- Eurois occulta (Linnaeus, 1758)-ON, QC, NB, NS, PE, NF, BC, AB, SK, NT, YT, MB
- Graphiphora augur (Fabricius, 1775)-ON, QC, NB, NS, PE, NF, BC, AB, SK, NT, YT, MB
- Hemipachnobia monochromatea (Morrison, 1874)-ON, QC, NB, NS, PE, NF, AB, SK
- Lycophotia phyllophora (Grote, 1874)-ON, QC, NB, NS, PE, NF, BC, AB, SK
- Noctua comes (Hübner, [1813])-BC
- Noctua pronuba (Linnaeus, 1758)-ON, QC, NB, NS, PE, NF, BC, AB, SK NU, MB
- Ochropleura implecta Lafontaine, 1998-ON, QC, NB, NS, PE, NF, BC, AB, SK, MB
- Parabagrotis cupidissima (Grote, 1875)-BC
- Parabagrotis exsertistigma (Morrison, 1874)-BC, AB, SK, MB
- Parabagrotis formalis (Grote, 1874)-BC
- Parabagrotis insularis (Grote, 1876)-BC
- Parabagrotis sulinaris Lafontaine, 1998-BC
- Parabarrovia keelei Gibson, 1920-NT, YT
- Parabarrovia ogilviensis Lafontaine, 1988-YT
- Paradiarsia littoralis (Packard, 1867)-ON, QC, NB, NS, NF, BC, AB, SK, YT, MB
- Prognorisma substrigata (Smith, 1895)-BC, AB, SK, NT
- Pronoctua craboi Lafontaine, 1998-BC, AB
- Pronoctua peabodyae (Dyar, 1903)-BC, AB
- Pronoctua typica Smith, 1894-BC
- Protolampra brunneicollis (Grote, 1865)-ON, QC, NB, AB, SK
- Protolampra rufipectus (Morrison, 1875)-ON, QC, NB, NS, NF, BC, AB, SK, NT, YT, MB
- Pseudohermonassa bicarnea (Guenée, 1852)-ON, QC, NB, NS, PE, NF, SK, MB
- Pseudohermonassa flavotincta (Smith, 1892)-BC
- Pseudohermonassa tenuicula (Morrison, 1874)-ON, QC, NB, NS, NF, BC, AB, SK, NT, MB
- Rhyacia clemens (Smith, 1890)-BC, AB, SK, YT
- Rhyacia quadrangula (Zetterstedt, 1839)-QC, NS, NF, NT, MB
- Setagrotis pallidicollis (Grote, 1880)-BC, AB
- Setagrotis radiola (Hampson, 1903)-AB
- Spaelotis bicava Lafontaine, 1998-BC, AB, SK
- Spaelotis clandestina (Harris, 1841)-ON, QC, NB, NS, PE, NF, BC, AB, SK, NT, YT, MB
- Tesagrotis atrifrons (Grote, 1873)-BC
- Tesagrotis corrodera (Smith, 1907)-BC
- Tesagrotis piscipellis (Grote, 1878)-BC
- Xestia aequaeva (Benjamin, 1934)-YT
- Xestia alaskae (Grote, 1876)-YT
- Xestia albuncula (Eversmann, 1851)-NT, YT
- Xestia atrata (Morrison, 1874)-ON, QC, BC, AB, YT, MB
- Xestia badicollis (Grote, 1873)-ON, QC, NB, NS
- Xestia bryanti (Benjamin, 1933)-BC, NT, YT
- Xestia c-nigrum (Linnaeus, 1758)-ON, QC, NB, NS, NF, BC, AB, SK, NT, YT, MB
- Xestia dolosa Franclemont, 1980-ON, QC, NB, PE, MB
- Xestia fabulosa (Ferguson, 1965)-ON, QC, NB, NF, BC, AB, SK, YT, MB
- Xestia fergusoni Lafontaine, 1983-YT
- Xestia finatimis Lafontaine, 1998-BC, AB
- Xestia homogena (McDunnough, 1921)-QC, NF, BC, AB, SK, NT, YT, MB
- Xestia imperita (Hübner, [1831])-QC, NB, NS, NF, BC, AB, SK, NU, NT, YT, MB
- Xestia infimatis (Grote, 1880)-BC
- Xestia intermedia (Kononenko, 1981)-YT
- Xestia inuitica Lafontaine & Hensel, 1998-NU, NT, YT
- Xestia kolymae (Herz, 1903)-YT
- Xestia laxa Lafontaine & Mikkola, 1998-YT
- Xestia liquidaria (Eversmann, 1848)-YT
- Xestia lorezi (Staudinger, 1891)-YT
- Xestia lupa Lafontaine & Mikkola, 1998-QC, NF, BC, AB, NT, YT, MB
- Xestia lyngei (Rebel, 1923)-YT
- Xestia maculata (Smith, 1893)-BC, AB, YT
- Xestia mixta (Walker, 1856)-ON, QC, NB, NF, BC, AB, SK, NT, MB
- Xestia mustelina (Smith, 1900)-BC
- Xestia normanianus (Grote, 1874)-ON, QC, NB, NS, AB, SK, MB
- Xestia oblata (Morrison, 1875)-ON, QC, NB, NS, NF, BC, AB, SK, YT, MB
- Xestia okakensis (Packard, 1867)-QC, NF, BC, AB, NU, NT, YT, MB
- Xestia perquiritata (Morrison, 1874)-ON, QC, NB, NS, NF, BC, AB, SK, NT, YT, MB
- Xestia plebeia (Smith, 1898)-BC, AB
- Xestia praevia Lafontaine, 1998-QC, NB, BC, AB, SK, MB
- Xestia quieta (Hübner, [1813])-NU, NT, YT, MB
- Xestia scropulana (Morrison, 1874)-QC, NF, MB
- Xestia smithii (Snellen, 1896)-ON, QC, NB, NS, PE, NF, BC, AB, SK, NT, YT, MB
- Xestia speciosa (Hübner, [1813])-BC, AB, NU, NT, YT, MB
- Xestia staudingeri (Möschler, 1862)-QC, NF
- Xestia tecta (Hübner, [1808])-QC, NF, NU, NT, YT, MB
- Xestia thula Lafontaine & Kononenko, 1983-NU, NT, YT
- Xestia ursae (McDunnough, 1940)-BC, NU, NT, YT, MB
- Xestia vernilis (Grote, 1879)-AB
- Xestia verniloides Lafontaine, 1998-BC
- Xestia wockei (Möschler, 1862)-QC, NF, NT, YT
- Xestia woodi Lafontaine & Kononenko, 1983-NT, YT
- Xestia xanthographa ([Denis & Schiffermüller], 1775)-QC, BC
- Xestia youngii (Smith, 1902)-ON, QC, NB, NS, NF

== Subfamily Plusiinae ==
- Abrostola ovalis Guenée, 1852-ON, QC
- Abrostola urentis Guenée, 1852-ON, QC, NB, NS, BC, AB, SK, MB
- Argyrogramma verruca (Fabricius, 1794)-ON
- Ctenoplusia oxygramma (Geyer, 1832)-ON, QC, NB
- Pseudoplusia includens (Walker, [1858])-ON, QC, NB, NS
- Trichoplusia ni (Hübner, [1803])-ON, QC, NB, NS, NF, BC, AB, SK, MB
- Allagrapha aerea (Hübner, [1803])-ON, QC, NB, SK
- Anagrapha falcifera (Kirby, 1837)-ON, QC, NB, NS, PE, NF, BC, AB, SK, MB
- Autographa ampla (Walker, [1858])-ON, QC, NB, NS, PE, NF, BC, AB, SK, MB
- Autographa bimaculata (Stephens, 1830)-ON, QC, NB, NS, NF, BC, AB, SK, NT, MB
- Autographa buraetica (Staudinger, 1892)-BC, NT, YT
- Autographa californica (Speyer, 1875)-BC, AB, SK, MB
- Autographa corusca (Strecker, 1885)-QC, BC
- Autographa flagellum (Walker, [1858])-ON, QC, NB, NS, NF, BC, AB, SK, MB
- Autographa mappa (Grote & Robinson, 1868)-ON, QC, NB, NS, NF, BC, AB, SK, MB
- Autographa metallica (Grote, 1875)-BC, AB
- Autographa precationis (Guenée, 1852)-ON, QC, NB, NS, PE, SK, MB
- Autographa pseudogamma (Grote, 1875)-ON, QC, NB, NF, BC, AB, SK, YT, MB
- Autographa rubidus Ottolengui, 1902-ON, QC, NB, NS, BC, AB, SK, MB
- Autographa sansoni Dod, 1910-QC, BC, AB, YT
- Autographa speciosa Ottolengui, 1902-BC
- Autographa v-alba Ottolengui, 1902-BC, AB
- Chrysanympha formosa (Grote, 1865)-ON, QC, NB, NS, NF, AB, SK, MB
- Diachrysia aereoides (Grote, 1864)-ON, QC, NB, NS, NF, BC, AB, SK, MB
- Diachrysia balluca Geyer, 1832-ON, QC, NB, NS, AB, SK, MB
- Eosphoropteryx thyatyroides (Guenée, 1852)-ON, QC, NB, NS, BC, AB, SK, MB
- Euchalcia borealis Lafontaine & Poole, 1991-BC
- Exyra fax (Grote, 1873)-ON, QC, NB, NS, MB
- Megalographa biloba (Stephens, 1830)-ON, QC, NB, NS, BC, SK, MB
- Plusia contexta Grote, 1873-ON, QC, NS, SK, MB
- Plusia nichollae (Hampson, 1913)-BC
- Plusia putnami Grote, 1873-ON, QC, NB, NS, PE, NF, BC, AB, SK, NT, YT, MB
- Plusia venusta Walker, 1865-ON, QC, NB, NS, PE, NF, BC, AB, SK, NT, MB
- Polychrysia esmeralda (Oberthür, 1880)-BC, AB, SK, NT, YT, MB
- Pseudeva palligera (Grote, 1881)-BC
- Pseudeva purpurigera (Walker, 1858)-ON, QC, NB, NS, NF, AB, SK, MB
- Rachiplusia ou (Guenée, 1852)-ON, QC, NS, MB
- Syngrapha abstrusa Eichlin & Cunningham, 1978-ON, QC, NB, NS, NF, BC, AB, MB
- Syngrapha alias (Ottolengui, 1902)-ON, QC, NB, NF, BC, AB, SK, NT, YT, MB
- Syngrapha altera (Ottolengui, 1902)-ON, QC, NB, NS, NF
- Syngrapha alticola (Walker, [1858])-QC, BC, AB, NU, NT, YT, MB
- Syngrapha angulidens (Smith, 1891)-BC, AB
- Syngrapha borea (Aurivillius, 1890)-BC, AB, NT, YT
- Syngrapha celsa (Edwards, 1881)-BC
- Syngrapha cryptica Eichlin & Cunningham, 1978-ON, QC, NB, NS, PE
- Syngrapha diasema (Boisduval, 1828)-QC, NF, BC, AB, SK, NU, NT, YT, MB
- Syngrapha epigaea (Grote, 1875)-ON, QC, NB, NS, NF, BC, AB, SK, YT, MB
- Syngrapha ignea (Grote, 1863)-QC, NF, BC, AB, SK, NT, YT
- Syngrapha interrogationis (Linnaeus, 1758)-QC, NF, BC, AB, SK, NU, NT, YT, MB
- Syngrapha microgamma (Hübner, 1823)-ON, QC, NB, NS, NF, BC, AB, SK, NT, YT, MB
- Syngrapha montana (Packard, 1869)-ON, QC, NB, NS, NF, SK
- Syngrapha octoscripta (Grote, 1874)-ON, QC, NB, NS, PE, NF, BC, AB, SK, NT, YT, MB
- Syngrapha orophila Hampson, 1908-BC, AB
- Syngrapha parilis (Hübner, [1809])-ON, QC, NF, BC, AB, NU, NT, YT, MB
- Syngrapha rectangula (Kirby, 1837)-ON, QC, NB, NS, NF, BC, AB, SK, MB
- Syngrapha selecta (Walker, [1858])-ON, QC, NB, NS, NF, AB, NT, MB
- Syngrapha surena (Grote, 1882)-ON, QC, NB, NS, NF, AB, SK
- Syngrapha u-aureum (Guenée, 1852)-QC, NF, MB
- Syngrapha viridisigma (Grote, 1874)-ON, QC, NB, NS, PE, NF, BC, AB, SK, NT, YT, MB

== Subfamily Psaphidinae ==
- Feralia comstocki (Grote, 1874)-ON, QC, NB, NS, NF, BC, AB, SK, MB
- Feralia deceptiva McDunnough, 1920-BC
- Feralia jocosa (Guenée, 1852)-ON, QC, NB, NS, PE, NF, BC, AB, SK, MB
- Feralia major Smith, 1890-ON, QC, NB, NS, AB, MB
- Brachionycha borealis (Smith, 1899)-ON, QC, NB, NF, AB, SK, MB
- Copivaleria grotei (Morrison, 1874)-ON, QC, NB, NS, SK, MB
- Psaphida electilis (Morrison, 1875)-ON, QC
- Psaphida grandis Smith, 1898-ON
- Psaphida resumens Walker, 1865-ON
- Psaphida rolandi Grote, 1874-ON, QC
- Psaphida styracis (Guenée, 1852)-ON, QC
- Psaphida thaxterianus (Grote, 1874)-ON

== Subfamily Stiriinae ==
- Azenia obtusa (Herrich-Schäffer, 1854)-ON
- Cirrhophanus triangulifer Grote, 1872-ON
- Plagiomimicus expallidus Grote, 1883-AB, SK, MB
- Plagiomimicus heitzmani Poole, 1995-MB
- Plagiomimicus pityochromus Grote, 1873-ON
- Plagiomimicus spumosum (Grote, 1874)-ON, AB
- Stiria rugifrons Grote, 1874-AB, SK, MB

== Subfamily Ufeinae ==
- Ufeus plicatus Grote, 1873-ON, BC, AB, SK
- Ufeus satyricus Grote, 1873-ON, QC, NB, NS, BC, AB, SK, MB
- Ufeus unicolor Grote, 1878-BC
