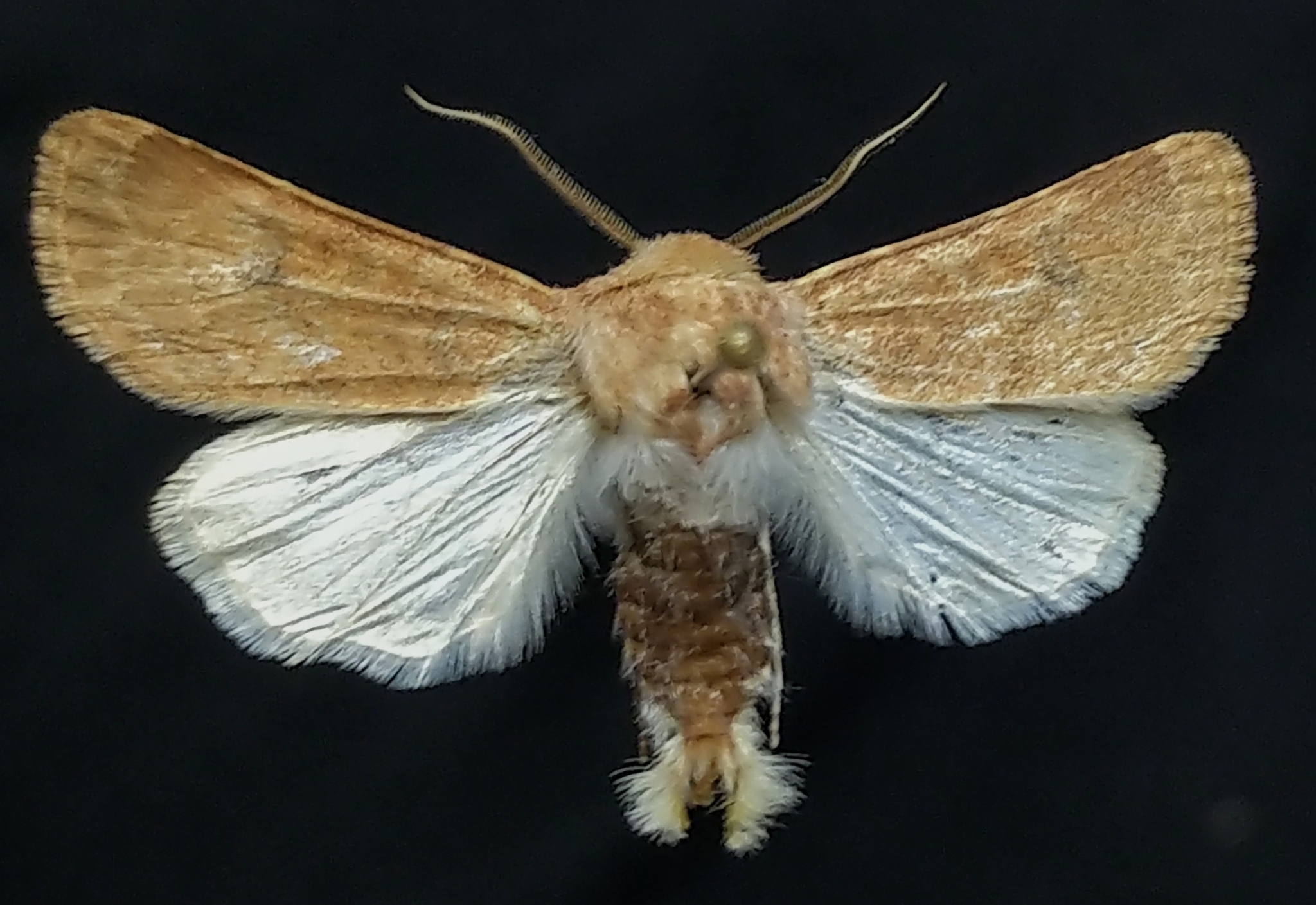

Scientific classification
- Domain: Eukaryota
- Kingdom: Animalia
- Phylum: Arthropoda
- Class: Insecta
- Order: Lepidoptera
- Superfamily: Noctuoidea
- Family: Noctuidae
- Genus: Euxoa
- Species: E. siccata

Binomial name
- Euxoa siccata (Smith, 1893)

Synonyms
- Carneades siccata; Euxoa placida; Porosagrotis siccata Smith, 1893

= Euxoa siccata =

Species of moth

Euxoa siccata is a species of moth in the family Noctuidae that was first described by Smith in 1893. It is found in North America, including Alberta and Colorado.

The wingspan is about 30 mm.
