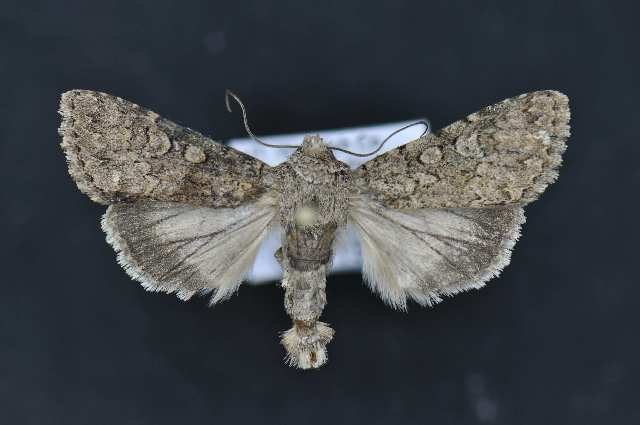

Scientific classification
- Domain: Eukaryota
- Kingdom: Animalia
- Phylum: Arthropoda
- Class: Insecta
- Order: Lepidoptera
- Superfamily: Noctuoidea
- Family: Noctuidae
- Genus: Sympistis
- Species: S. glennyi

Binomial name
- Sympistis glennyi Grote, 1873

Synonyms
- Oncocnemis glennyi; Oncocnemis phairi McDunnough, 1927

= Sympistis glennyi =

Species of moth

Sympistis glennyi is a moth of the family Noctuidae first described by Augustus Radcliffe Grote in 1873. It is found in western North America from the mountains of southern Alberta west to British Columbia and south at least to Colorado and California.

The wingspan is about 35 mm.
