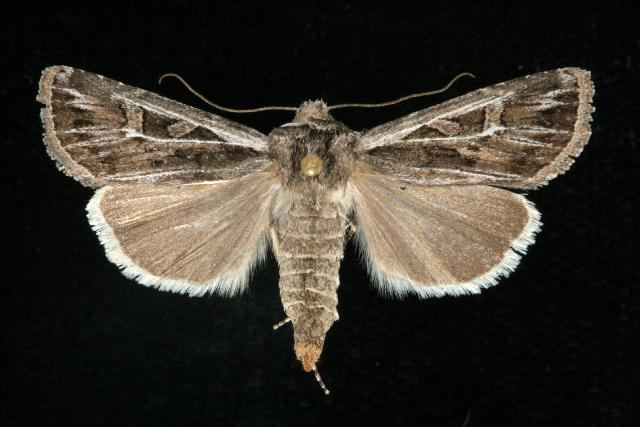

Scientific classification
- Kingdom: Animalia
- Phylum: Arthropoda
- Class: Insecta
- Order: Lepidoptera
- Superfamily: Noctuoidea
- Family: Noctuidae
- Tribe: Noctuini
- Subtribe: Agrotina
- Genus: Euxoa
- Species: E. quadridentata

Binomial name
- Euxoa quadridentata (Grote & Robinson, 1865)

= Euxoa quadridentata =

Species of moth

Euxoa quadridentata is a species of cutworm or dart moth in the family Noctuidae. It is found in North America.

The MONA or Hodges number for Euxoa quadridentata is 10830.
