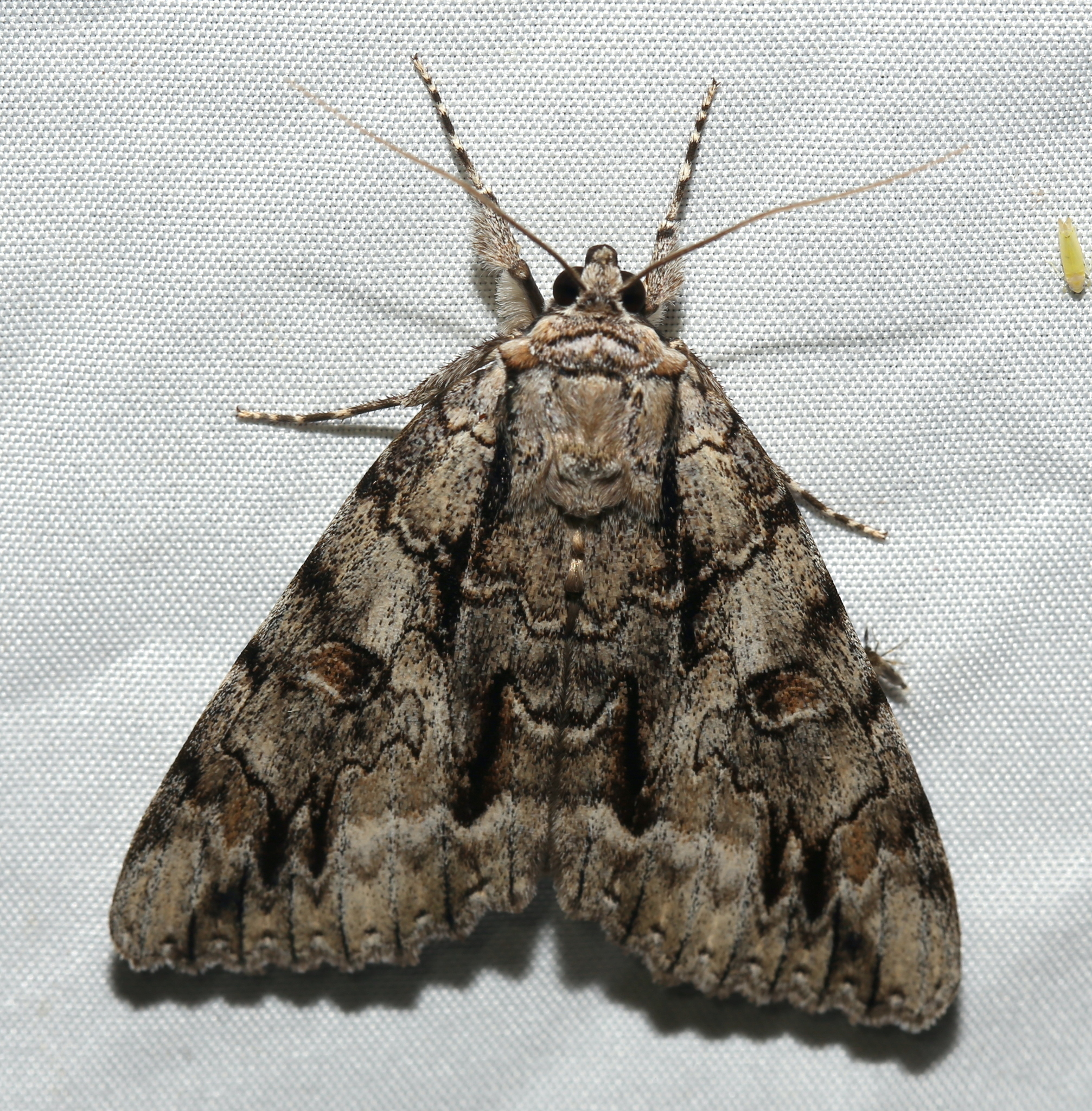

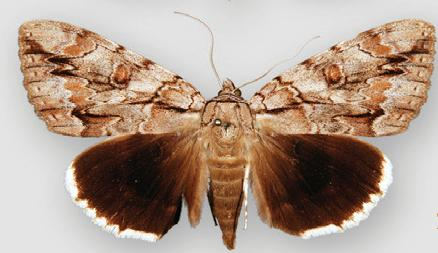
- Lectotype of Catabapta luctuosa, now mostly considered a synonym of Catocala retecta

Scientific classification
- Kingdom: Animalia
- Phylum: Arthropoda
- Clade: Pancrustacea
- Class: Insecta
- Order: Lepidoptera
- Superfamily: Noctuoidea
- Family: Erebidae
- Genus: Catocala
- Species: C. retecta

Binomial name
- Catocala retecta Grote, 1872

Synonyms
- Catabapta retecta; Catocala luctuosa Hulst, 1884

= Catocala retecta =

Yellow-gray underwing

Species of moth

Catocala retecta, the yellow-gray underwing, is a moth of the family Erebidae. The species was first described by Augustus Radcliffe Grote in 1872. It can be found in North America from southern Ontario and Quebec south through Maine and New Jersey, south through Tennessee to Georgia and west to Arkansas and Kansas and north to Wisconsin. There is one recognised subspecies, Catocala retecta luctuosa, which is sometimes treated as a valid species with the common name yellow-fringed underwing.

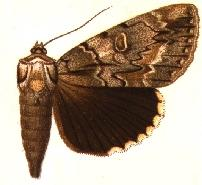

The wingspan is 60–75 mm. The moths flies from July to October depending on the location.

The larvae feed on Juglans and Carya species.

== Subspecies ==
- Catocala retecta retecta
- Catocala retecta luctuosa Hulst, 1884 – yellow-fringed underwing
