= Euxoa costata =

Scientific classification
- Kingdom: Animalia
- Phylum: Arthropoda
- Class: Insecta
- Order: Lepidoptera
- Superfamily: Noctuoidea
- Family: Noctuidae
- Genus: Euxoa
- Species: E. costata

Binomial name
- Euxoa costata (Grote, 1876)

Synonyms
- Agrotis costata Grote, 1876

Species of moth

Euxoa costata is a moth of the family Noctuidae. It is found in British Columbia, south into the north-western United States where it is abundant in the ponderosa pine forests east of the Cascade Mountains.

The wingspan is about 34 mm.
