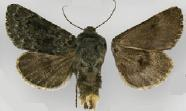

Scientific classification
- Kingdom: Animalia
- Phylum: Arthropoda
- Clade: Pancrustacea
- Class: Insecta
- Order: Lepidoptera
- Superfamily: Noctuoidea
- Family: Noctuidae
- Genus: Lasionycta
- Species: L. phoca

Binomial name
- Lasionycta phoca (Möschler, 1864)

Synonyms
- Dianthoecia phoca Möschler, 1864; Scotogramma phoca Smith, 1893a; Lasiestra phoca Hampson, 1905; Lasionycta phoca Lafontaine et al., 1986; Scotogramma albinuda Smith, 1903; Lasionycta albinuda McDunnough, 1938

= Lasionycta phoca =

Species of moth

Lasionycta phoca is a species of moth in the family Noctuidae. It occurs in eastern and central Canada with records from Labrador to the west coast of Hudson Bay.

Adults fly over tundra, are diurnal and nocturnal, and come to light. Adults are on wing in June and July.
