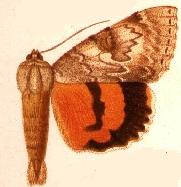

Scientific classification
- Kingdom: Animalia
- Phylum: Arthropoda
- Class: Insecta
- Order: Lepidoptera
- Superfamily: Noctuoidea
- Family: Erebidae
- Genus: Catocala
- Species: C. meskei

Binomial name
- Catocala meskei Grote, 1873

Synonyms
- Catocala beaniana Grote, 1878; Catocala rosalinda H. Edwards, 1880; Catocala mescei Hampson, 1913; Catocala meski; Catocala krombeini Franclemont, 1938; Catocala orion McDunnough, 1922; Catocala concolorata McDunnough, 1922

= Catocala meskei =

Meske's underwing

Species of moth

Catocala meskei, or Meske's underwing, is a moth of the family Erebidae. The species was first described by Augustus Radcliffe Grote in 1873. It is found in North America from Maine and Quebec west to southern Alberta and Montana, south to South Carolina in the east and at least Montana in the west.

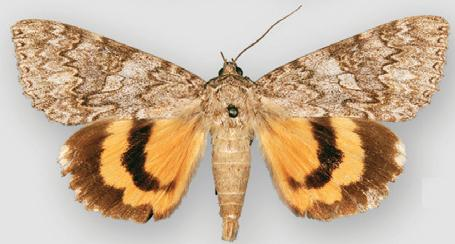
Lectotype of Catocala rosalinda, now considered a synonym of Catocala meskei

The wingspan is 65–75 mm. Adults are on wing from July to September depending on the location.

The larvae feed on Populus and Salix species.

== Subspecies ==
Catocala meskei orion, described from Alberta, is now considered a synonym.
