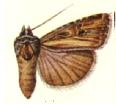

Scientific classification
- Domain: Eukaryota
- Kingdom: Animalia
- Phylum: Arthropoda
- Class: Insecta
- Order: Lepidoptera
- Superfamily: Noctuoidea
- Family: Noctuidae
- Genus: Euxoa
- Species: E. pluralis

Binomial name
- Euxoa pluralis Grote, 1878

Synonyms
- Agrotis pluralis; Porosagrotis pluralis

= Euxoa pluralis =

Species of moth

Euxoa pluralis is a species of moth of the family Noctuidae. It is found from British Columbia, south to Nevada and California.

The wingspan is about 34 mm.
