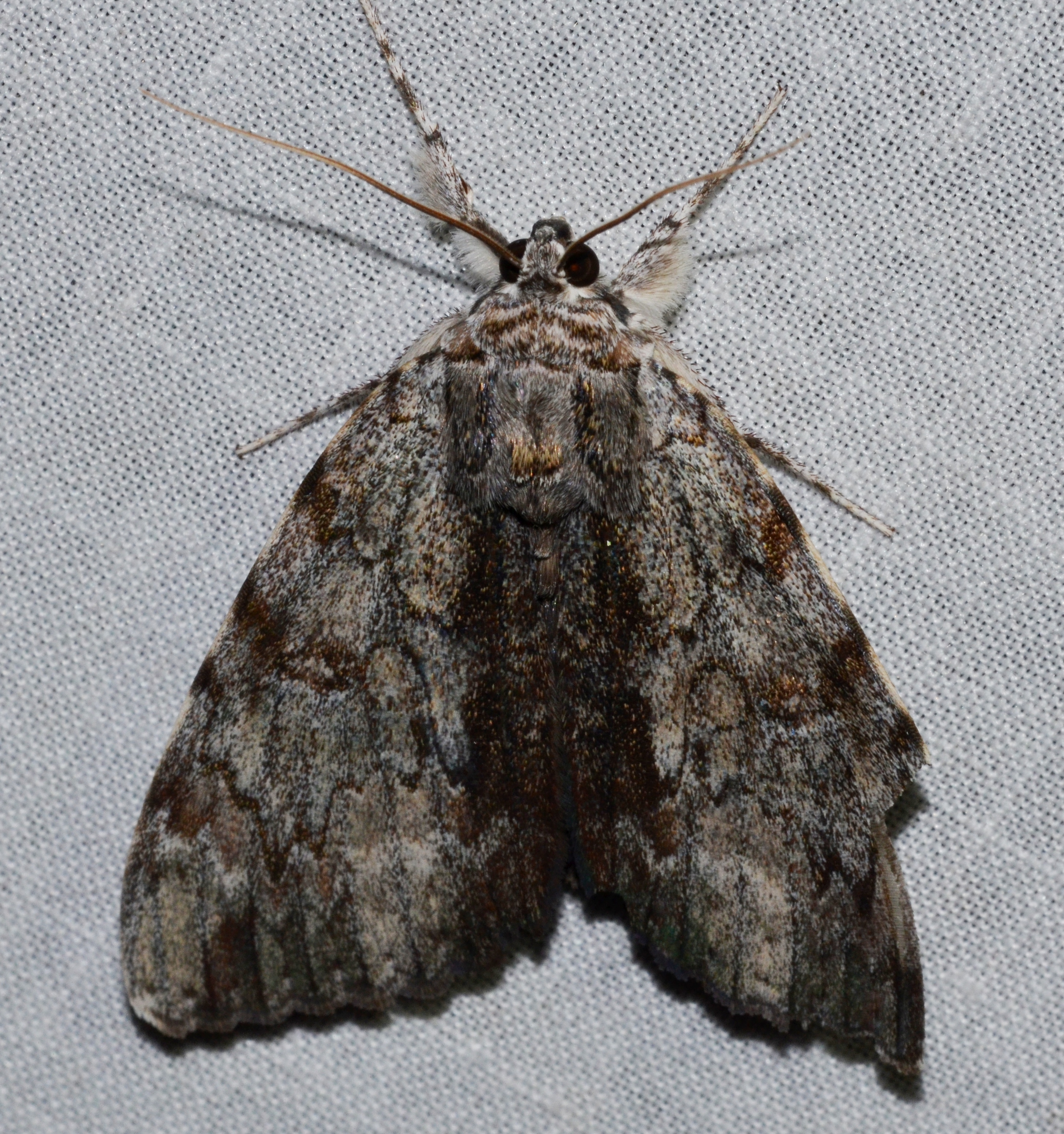

Scientific classification
- Kingdom: Animalia
- Phylum: Arthropoda
- Class: Insecta
- Order: Lepidoptera
- Superfamily: Noctuoidea
- Family: Erebidae
- Genus: Catocala
- Species: C. insolabilis

Binomial name
- Catocala insolabilis Guenée, 1852

Synonyms
- Catabapta insolabilis

= Catocala insolabilis =

Species of moth

Catocala insolabilis, the inconsolable underwing, is a moth of the family Erebidae. The species was first described by Achille Guenée in 1852. It is found in North America from Ontario through Maine and Connecticut south to Florida, west through Arkansas to Texas and Oklahoma and north to South Dakota.

The wingspan is 65–75 mm. Adults are on wing from June to August depending on the location. There is one generation per year.

The larvae feed on Carya species.

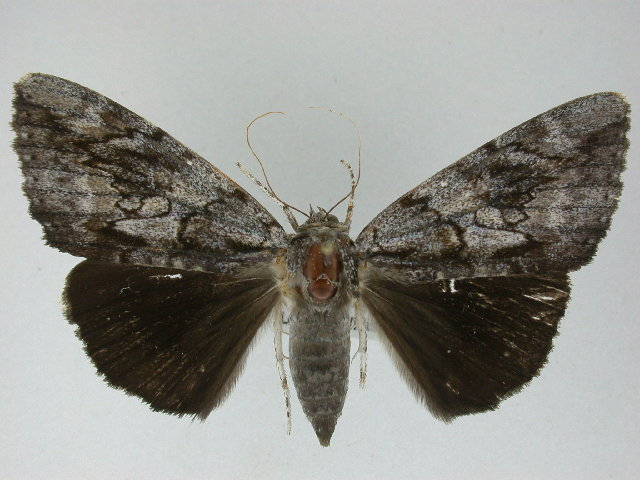
Mounted specimen
