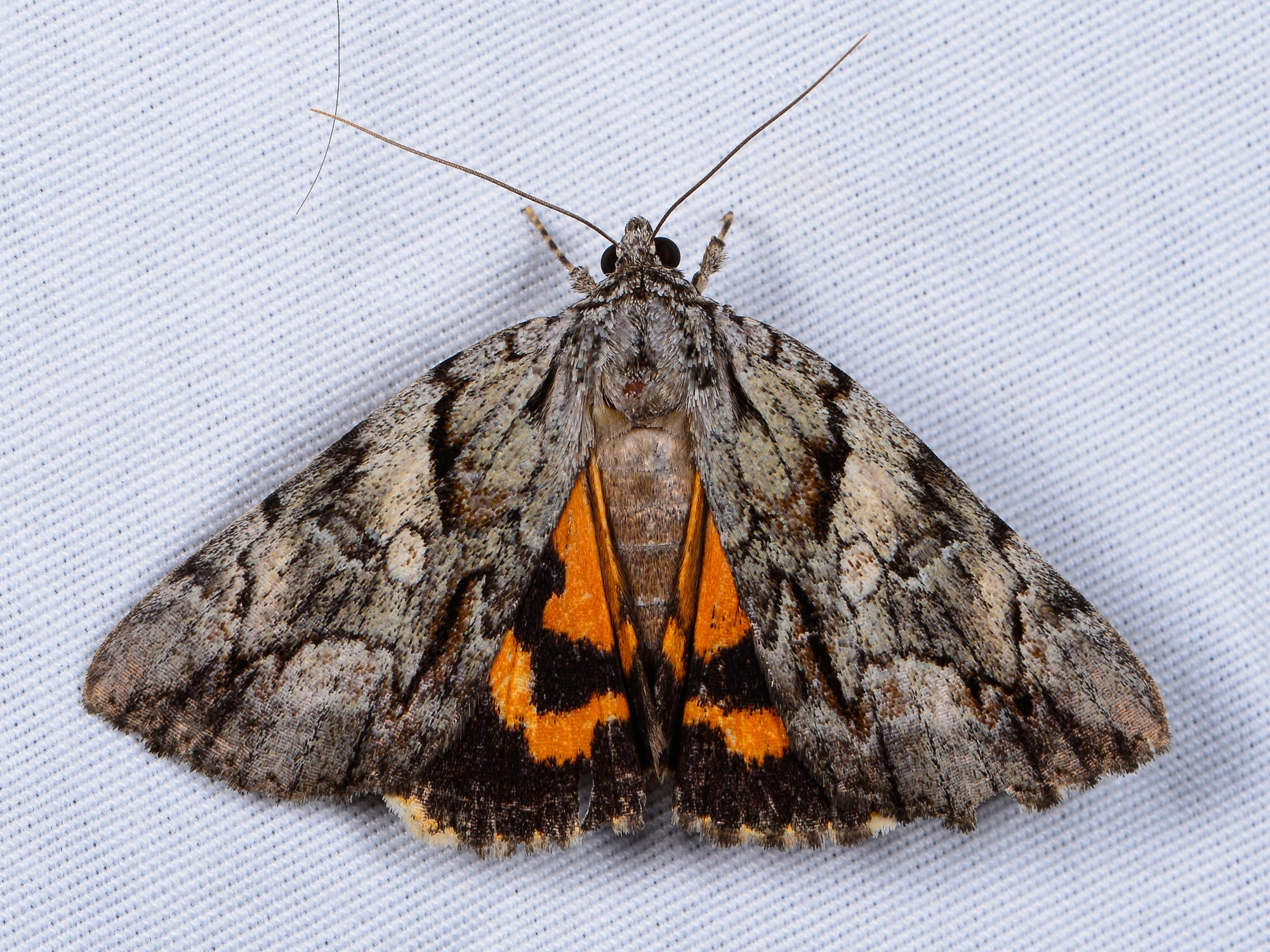

Scientific classification
- Kingdom: Animalia
- Phylum: Arthropoda
- Class: Insecta
- Order: Lepidoptera
- Superfamily: Noctuoidea
- Family: Erebidae
- Genus: Catocala
- Species: C. mira

Binomial name
- Catocala mira Grote, 1876

Synonyms
- Catocala nira; Catocala polygama mira; Catocala dana Cassino, 1918

= Catocala mira =

Wonderful underwing

Species of moth

Catocala mira, the wonderful underwing, is a species of moth in the family Erebidae. The species was first described by Augustus Radcliffe Grote in 1876. It is found in North America from Manitoba through southern Ontario and Quebec through New Hampshire and Connecticut to Florida, west to Texas and north through Iowa and Illinois.

Its wingspan is 40–50 mm. Adults are on wing from July to August. There is probably only one generation per year.

The larvae feed on Crataegus.

== Etymology ==
The species name mira means "wonderful" and is derived from Latin.

== Description ==
C. mira has grey forewings with a lighter gray diagonal band extending horizontally across each wing. The orange hindwings have two black bands with a highly irregular edge and a checkered fringe about the outermost margins.
