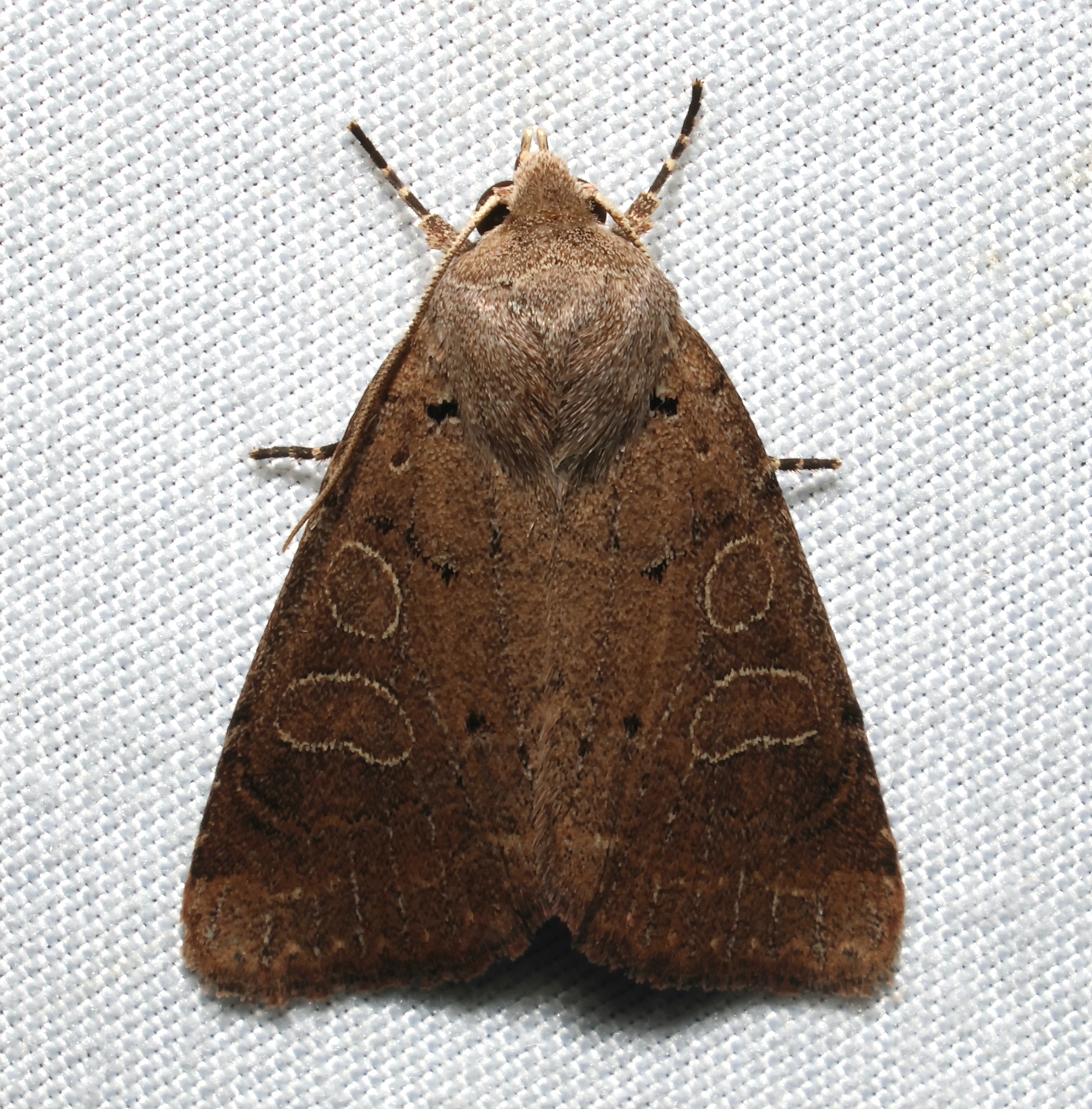

Scientific classification
- Kingdom: Animalia
- Phylum: Arthropoda
- Class: Insecta
- Order: Lepidoptera
- Superfamily: Noctuoidea
- Family: Noctuidae
- Genus: Kocakina; Ozdikmen & Sevem, 2006
- Species: K. fidelis

Binomial name
- Kocakina fidelis (Grote, 1874)

Synonyms
- Taeniocampa intractata Morrison, 1875; Himella intractata; Himella fidelis; Orthimella fidelis Schmidt, Lafontaine & Troubridge, 2018

= Kocakina =

Genus of moths

Kocakina is a genus of moths of the family Noctuidae. It contains only one species, Kocakina fidelis, the intractable quaker moth, which is found in North America, where it has been recorded from Quebec and Maine to Florida, west to Texas and Kansas. The habitat consists of dry woodlands. The former genus name, Himella, is a junior homonym, and was replaced by Kocakina in 2006.
