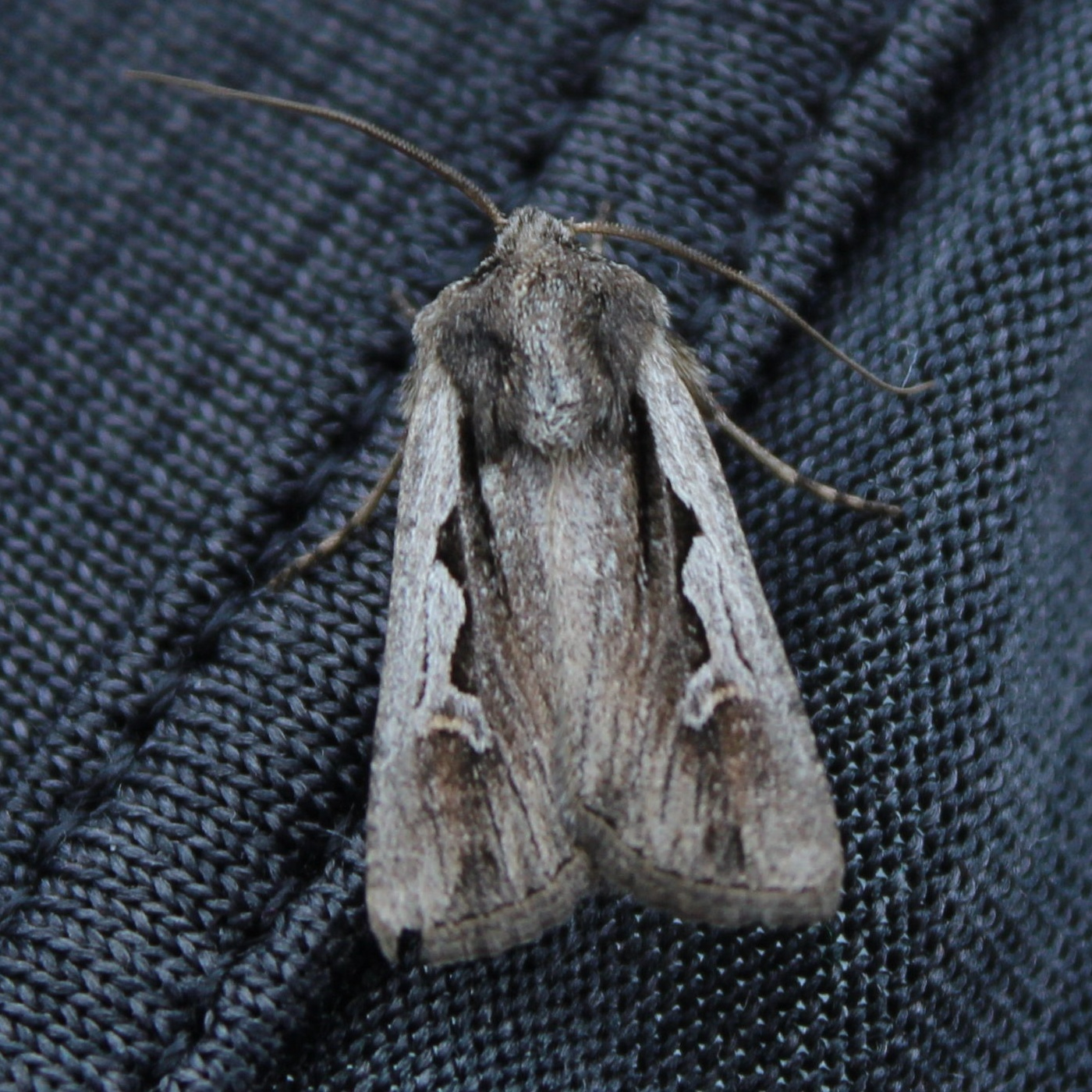

Scientific classification
- Kingdom: Animalia
- Phylum: Arthropoda
- Class: Insecta
- Order: Lepidoptera
- Superfamily: Noctuoidea
- Family: Noctuidae
- Genus: Euxoa
- Species: E. hollemani

Binomial name
- Euxoa hollemani (Grote, 1874)

Synonyms
- Euxoa andera Smith, 1910

= Euxoa hollemani =

Species of moth

Euxoa hollemani is a species of cutworm or dart moth in the family Noctuidae. It is found in North America.

The MONA or Hodges number for Euxoa hollemani is 10820.
