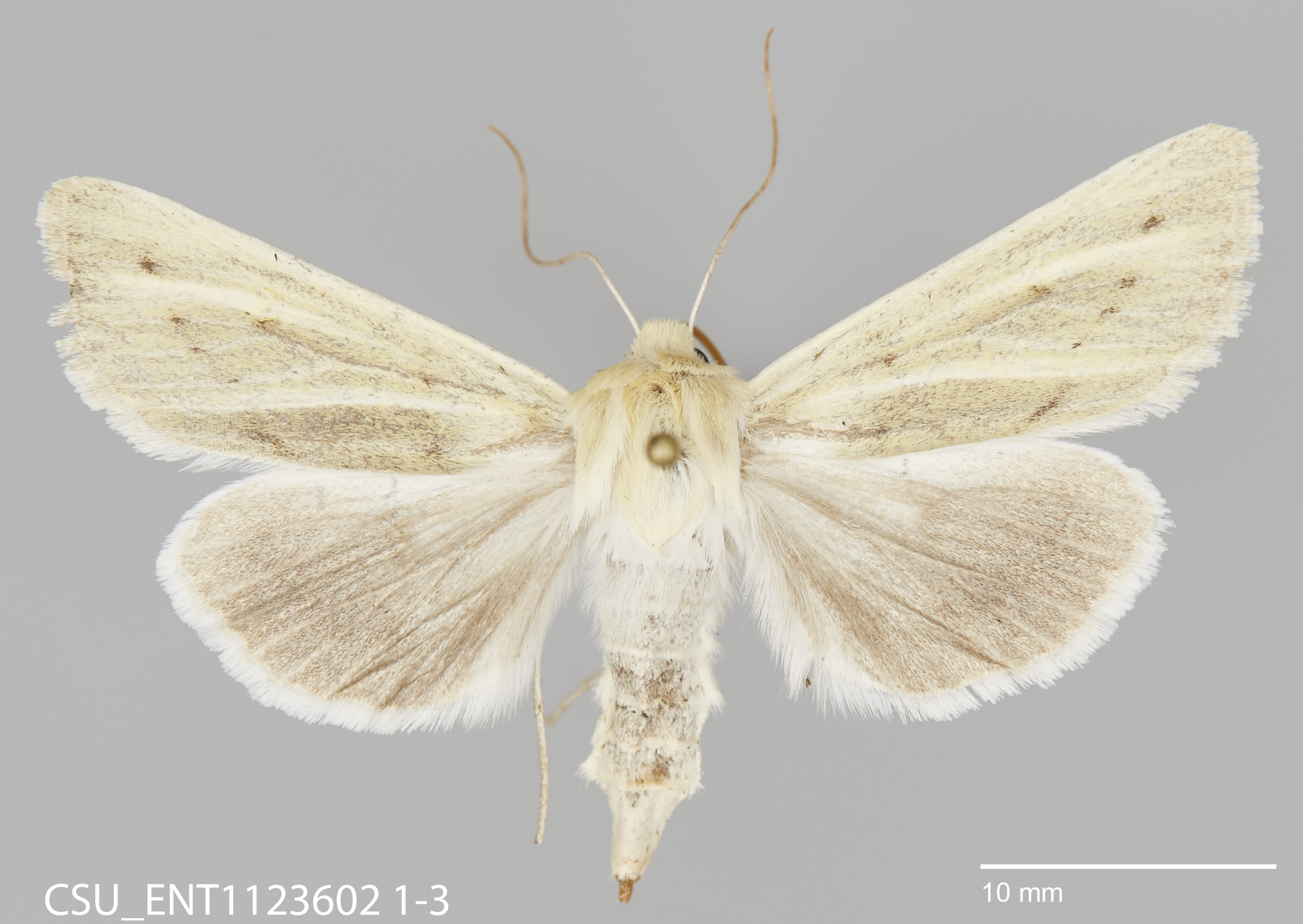
- Copablepharon viridisparsa gilvum

Scientific classification
- Domain: Eukaryota
- Kingdom: Animalia
- Phylum: Arthropoda
- Class: Insecta
- Order: Lepidoptera
- Superfamily: Noctuoidea
- Family: Noctuidae
- Genus: Copablepharon
- Species: C. viridisparsa

Binomial name
- Copablepharon viridisparsa Dod, 1916

Synonyms
- Copablepharon viridisparsum; Copablepharon hopfingeri Franclemont, 1954

= Copablepharon viridisparsa =

Species of moth

Copablepharon viridisparsa is a moth of the family Noctuidae first described by F. H. Wolley Dod in 1916. It is found from southern California and southern Utah north to southern British Columbia, central Saskatchewan and south-western Manitoba.

The wingspan is 38–42 mm. Adults are on wing from June to August depending on the location.

== Subspecies ==
- Copablepharon viridisparsa viridisparsa Dod, 1916
- Copablepharon viridisparsa hopfingeri (Franclemont, 1954)
- Copablepharon viridisparsa gilvum Crabo & Lafontaine, 2004
- Copablepharon viridisparsa ravum Crabo & Lafontaine, 2004
