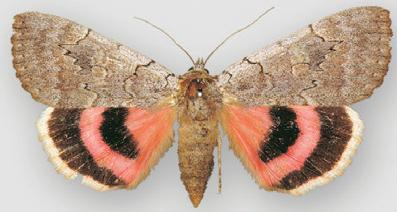

Scientific classification
- Kingdom: Animalia
- Phylum: Arthropoda
- Class: Insecta
- Order: Lepidoptera
- Superfamily: Noctuoidea
- Family: Erebidae
- Genus: Catocala
- Species: C. concumbens

Binomial name
- Catocala concumbens Walker, [1858]

Synonyms
- Catocala diana Edwards, 1880

= Catocala concumbens =

Pink underwing

Species of moth

Catocala concumbens, the sleepy underwing or pink underwing, is a moth of the family Erebidae. The species was first described by Francis Walker in 1858. It is found in eastern North America, west across the southern half of the Prairie Provinces to eastern Alberta.

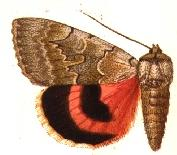
Illustration

The wingspan is 60–75 mm. Adults are on wing in August in one generation depending on the location.

The larvae feed on Populus and Salix species.
