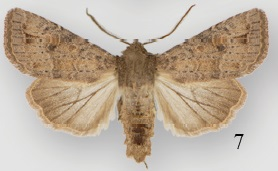
- Male
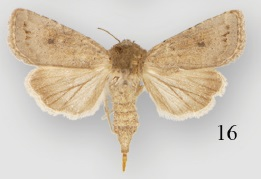
- Female

Scientific classification
- Kingdom: Animalia
- Phylum: Arthropoda
- Class: Insecta
- Order: Lepidoptera
- Superfamily: Noctuoidea
- Family: Noctuidae
- Genus: Protorthodes
- Species: P. incincta

Binomial name
- Protorthodes incincta (Morrison, 1874)

Synonyms
- Mamestra incincta Morrison, 1874; Taeniocampa utahensis Smith, [1888]; Orthodes akalus Strecker, 1899; Agrotis saturnus Strecker, 1900; Graphiphora communis r. smithii Dyar, 1904; Taeniocampa indra Smith, 1906; Eriopyga melanopis var. coloradensis Strand, [1917]; Eriopyga daviesi Barnes & Benjamin, 1927

= Protorthodes incincta =

Species of moth

Protorthodes incincta, the banded Quaker moth, is a moth in the family Noctuidae. It is found in North America, where it has been recorded in the western Great Plains and dry open forests of the Rocky Mountain region, with range extensions into the Great Basin, the American Southwest, and eastward in relict prairie areas into the Great Lakes region.

The length of the forewings is 11–14 mm. Adults are highly variable in appearance. The ground colour varies from pale whitish grey, through various shades of brown, orange and grey to blackish grey. It can be distinguished from similar species by the more irregular pale subterminal line, concentration of dark sagittate marks proximal to the subterminal line to the area distal to the reniform spot, and other characters of maculation, antenna, and male genitalia. The palest forms occur in xeric areas of Nevada, Arizona and New Mexico and were previously known as P. indra. The most contrastingly marked forms are found in southern Wyoming, Colorado and northern New Mexico and were previously known as P. daviesi. Adults are on wing from early June to early October.

The larvae feed on various herbaceous plants, including Fabaceae species.
