= Euxoa auripennis =

Scientific classification
- Domain: Eukaryota
- Kingdom: Animalia
- Phylum: Arthropoda
- Class: Insecta
- Order: Lepidoptera
- Superfamily: Noctuoidea
- Family: Noctuidae
- Genus: Euxoa
- Species: E. auripennis

Binomial name
- Euxoa auripennis Lafontaine, 1974

Synonyms
- Euxoa arizonensis Lafontaine, 1974

Species of moth

Euxoa auripennis is a moth of the family Noctuidae first described by J. Donald Lafontaine in 1974. It is found in western North America from eastern North Dakota and south-western Manitoba west to central British Columbia, south to southern California and Colorado.

The wingspan is 30–34 mm. Adults are on wing in August to September. There is one generation per year.

The larvae feed on various herbs at the soil surface.
