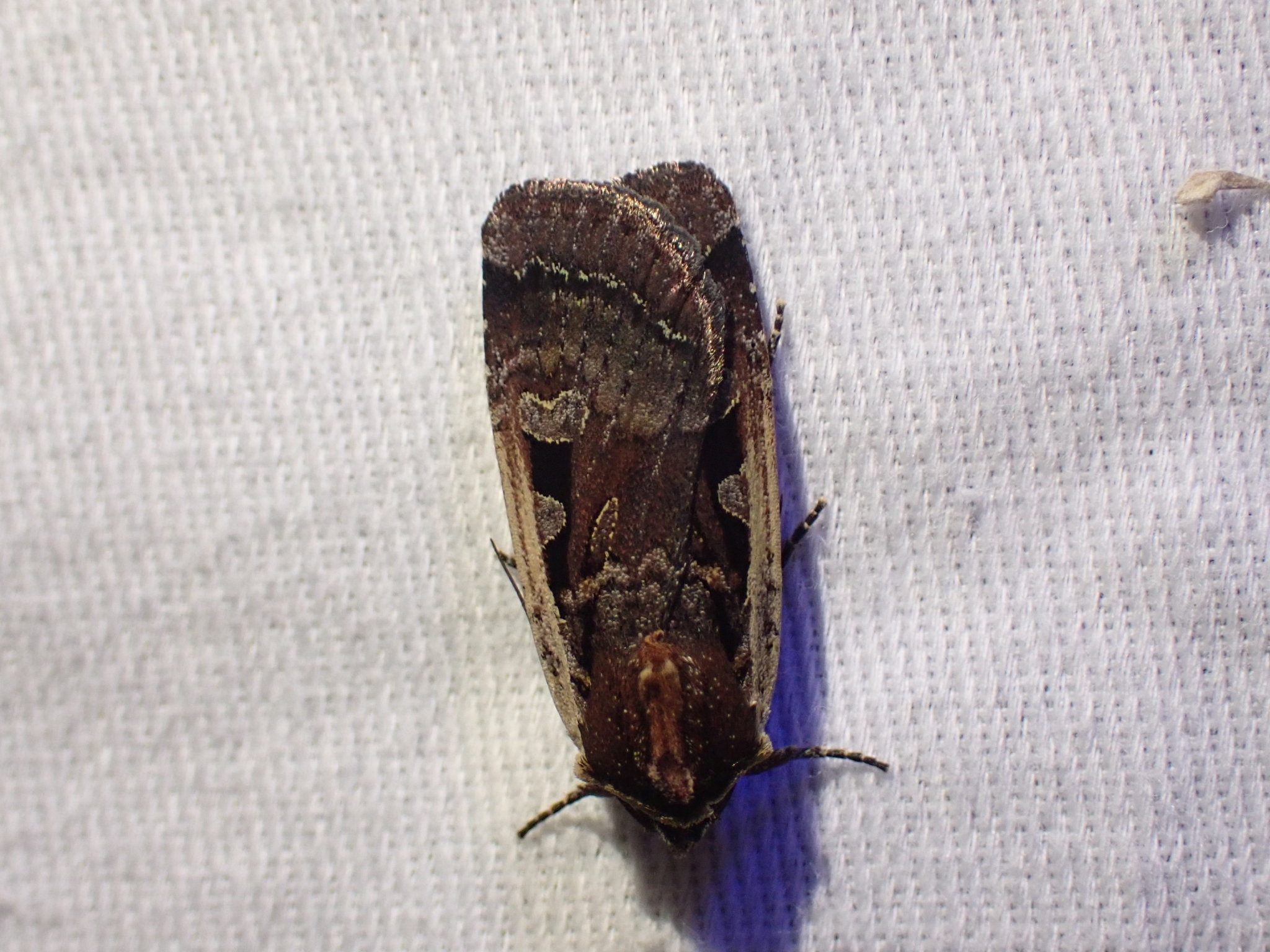

Scientific classification
- Domain: Eukaryota
- Kingdom: Animalia
- Phylum: Arthropoda
- Class: Insecta
- Order: Lepidoptera
- Superfamily: Noctuoidea
- Family: Noctuidae
- Tribe: Noctuini
- Subtribe: Noctuina
- Genus: Parabagrotis
- Species: P. exsertistigma

Binomial name
- Parabagrotis exsertistigma (Morrison, 1874)

= Parabagrotis exsertistigma =

Species of moth

Parabagrotis exsertistigma is a species of cutworm or dart moth in the family Noctuidae.

The MONA or Hodges number for Parabagrotis exsertistigma is 11047.
