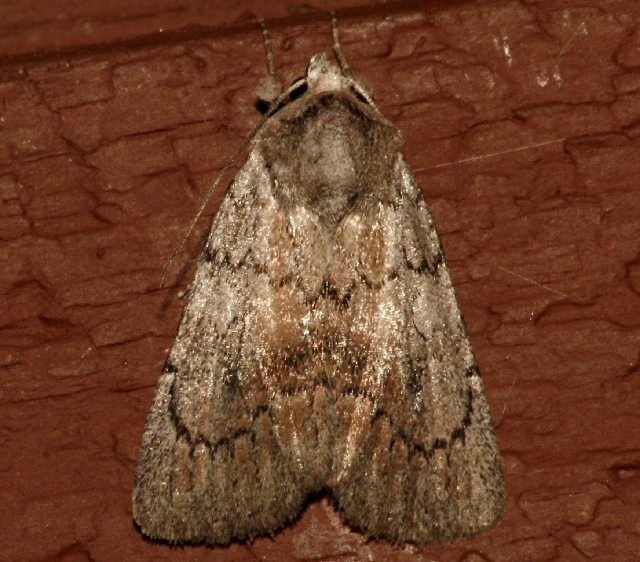
- Setagrotis pallidicollis

Scientific classification
- Domain: Eukaryota
- Kingdom: Animalia
- Phylum: Arthropoda
- Class: Insecta
- Order: Lepidoptera
- Superfamily: Noctuoidea
- Family: Noctuidae
- Subtribe: Noctuina
- Genus: Setagrotis; Smith, 1890

= Setagrotis =

Genus of moths

Setagrotis is a genus of moths of the family Noctuidae.

== Species ==
- Setagrotis pallidicollis (Grote, 1880) (syn: Setagrotis planiforns (Smith, 1890))
- Setagrotis vocalis (Grote, 1879) (syn (homonym): Setagrotis cinereicollis (Grote, 1876))

== Former species ==
- Setagrotis atrifrons is now Tesagrotis atrifrons (Grote, 1873)
