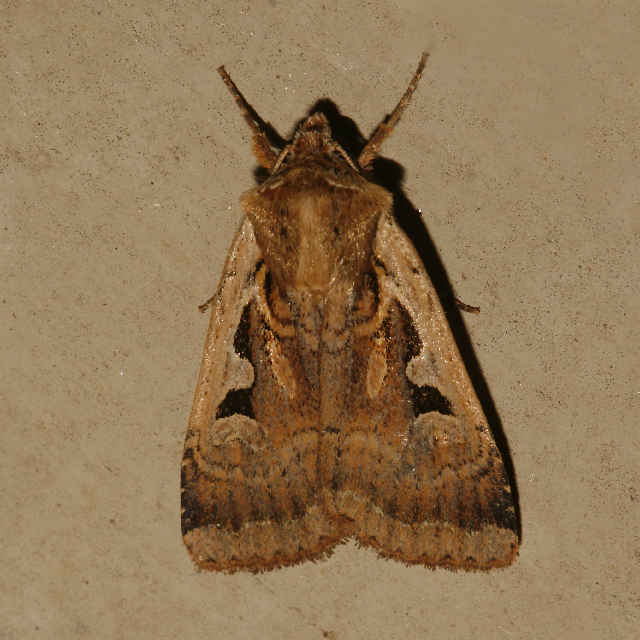

Scientific classification
- Domain: Eukaryota
- Kingdom: Animalia
- Phylum: Arthropoda
- Class: Insecta
- Order: Lepidoptera
- Superfamily: Noctuoidea
- Family: Noctuidae
- Tribe: Noctuini
- Subtribe: Noctuina
- Genus: Parabagrotis
- Species: P. sulinaris

Binomial name
- Parabagrotis sulinaris Lafontaine, 1998

= Parabagrotis sulinaris =

Species of moth

Parabagrotis sulinaris is a species of cutworm or dart moth in the family Noctuidae. It is found in North America.

The MONA or Hodges number for Parabagrotis sulinaris is 11048.
