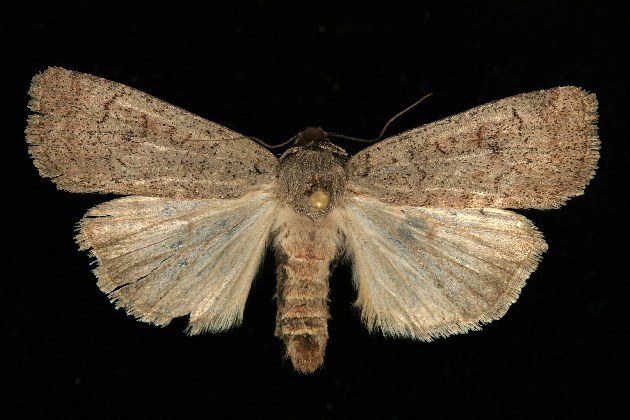

Scientific classification
- Domain: Eukaryota
- Kingdom: Animalia
- Phylum: Arthropoda
- Class: Insecta
- Order: Lepidoptera
- Superfamily: Noctuoidea
- Family: Noctuidae
- Tribe: Noctuini
- Subtribe: Noctuina
- Genus: Protolampra
- Species: P. rufipectus

Binomial name
- Protolampra rufipectus (Morrison, 1875)

= Protolampra rufipectus =

Species of moth

Protolampra rufipectus, the red-breasted dart moth, is a species of cutworm or dart moth in the family Noctuidae. It is found in North America.

The MONA or Hodges number for Protolampra rufipectus is 11004.
