= Fungorum =

Fungorum may refer to:

== Species ==
- Choephora fungorum, species of moth
- Mycetophila fungorum, species of fungus gnat
- Paraburkholderia fungorum, species of bacteria

== Other uses ==
- Index Fungorum, project to index all scientific names in the fungus kingdom
