= Abagrotis hennei =

Scientific classification
- Kingdom: Animalia
- Phylum: Arthropoda
- Clade: Pancrustacea
- Class: Insecta
- Order: Lepidoptera
- Superfamily: Noctuoidea
- Family: Noctuidae
- Tribe: Noctuini
- Subtribe: Noctuina
- Genus: Abagrotis
- Species: A. hennei

Binomial name
- Abagrotis hennei Buckett, 1968

Species of moth

Abagrotis hennei is a species of cutworm or dart moth in the family Noctuidae. It is found in North America.

The MONA or Hodges number for Abagrotis hennei is 11023.
