= Pseudohermonassa tenuicula =

Scientific classification
- Domain: Eukaryota
- Kingdom: Animalia
- Phylum: Arthropoda
- Class: Insecta
- Order: Lepidoptera
- Superfamily: Noctuoidea
- Family: Noctuidae
- Tribe: Noctuini
- Subtribe: Noctuina
- Genus: Pseudohermonassa
- Species: P. tenuicula

Binomial name
- Pseudohermonassa tenuicula (Morrison, 1874)

Species of moth

Pseudohermonassa tenuicula, known generally as the Morrison's sooty dart or hair-pin dart, is a species of cutworm or dart moth in the family Noctuidae. It is found in North America.

The MONA or Hodges number for Pseudohermonassa tenuicula is 10951.
