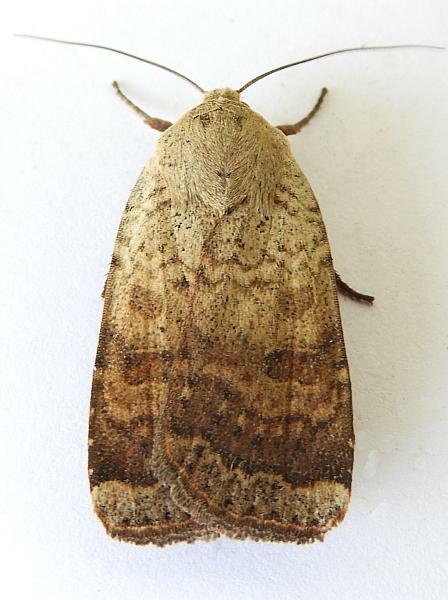
- In Arizona

Scientific classification
- Kingdom: Animalia
- Phylum: Arthropoda
- Clade: Pancrustacea
- Class: Insecta
- Order: Lepidoptera
- Superfamily: Noctuoidea
- Family: Noctuidae
- Tribe: Noctuini
- Subtribe: Noctuina
- Genus: Abagrotis
- Species: A. mexicana

Binomial name
- Abagrotis mexicana Lafontaine, 1998

= Abagrotis mexicana =

Species of moth

Abagrotis mexicana is a species of cutworm or dart moth in the family Noctuidae. It is found in Central America and North America.
