= Hemipachnobia monochromatea =

Scientific classification
- Domain: Eukaryota
- Kingdom: Animalia
- Phylum: Arthropoda
- Class: Insecta
- Order: Lepidoptera
- Superfamily: Noctuoidea
- Family: Noctuidae
- Tribe: Noctuini
- Subtribe: Noctuina
- Genus: Hemipachnobia
- Species: H. monochromatea

Binomial name
- Hemipachnobia monochromatea (Morrison, 1874)

Species of moth

Hemipachnobia monochromatea, known generally as the sundew dart or sundew cutworm moth, is a species of cutworm or dart moth in the family Noctuidae.

The MONA or Hodges number for Hemipachnobia monochromatea is 10993.1.
