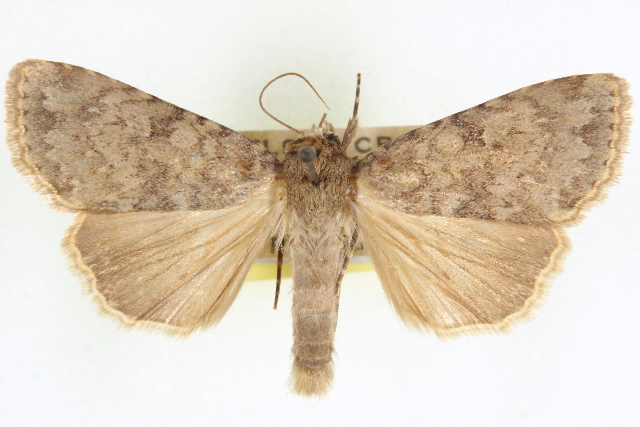

Scientific classification
- Domain: Eukaryota
- Kingdom: Animalia
- Phylum: Arthropoda
- Class: Insecta
- Order: Lepidoptera
- Superfamily: Noctuoidea
- Family: Noctuidae
- Tribe: Noctuini
- Subtribe: Noctuina
- Genus: Pronoctua
- Species: P. pyrophiloides

Binomial name
- Pronoctua pyrophiloides (Harvey, 1876)

= Pronoctua pyrophiloides =

Species of moth

Pronoctua pyrophiloides, the bronze dart, is a species of cutworm or dart moth in the family Noctuidae. It is found in North America.
