= Parabagrotis formalis =

Scientific classification
- Kingdom: Animalia
- Phylum: Arthropoda
- Class: Insecta
- Order: Lepidoptera
- Superfamily: Noctuoidea
- Family: Noctuidae
- Genus: Parabagrotis
- Species: P. formalis

Binomial name
- Parabagrotis formalis (Grote, 1874)

Synonyms
- Agrotis formalis Grote, 1874; Agrotis binominalis Smith, 1888; Triphaena faculoides Strand, 1916; Agrotis morrisonistigma Grote, 1876; Agrotis observabilis Grote, 1875

Species of moth

Parabagrotis formalis is a species of cutworm or dart moth in the family Noctuidae. It is found in North America.

The MONA or Hodges number for Parabagrotis formalis is 11047.1.
