= Parabarrovia =

Scientific classification
- Domain: Eukaryota
- Kingdom: Animalia
- Phylum: Arthropoda
- Class: Insecta
- Order: Lepidoptera
- Superfamily: Noctuoidea
- Family: Noctuidae
- Subtribe: Noctuina
- Genus: Parabarrovia; Gibson, 1920

Genus of moths

Parabarrovia is a genus of moths of the family Noctuidae.

== Species ==
- Parabarrovia keelei Gibson, 1920
- Parabarrovia omilaki Lafontaine, 1998
- Parabarrovia ogilviensis Lafontaine, 1988
