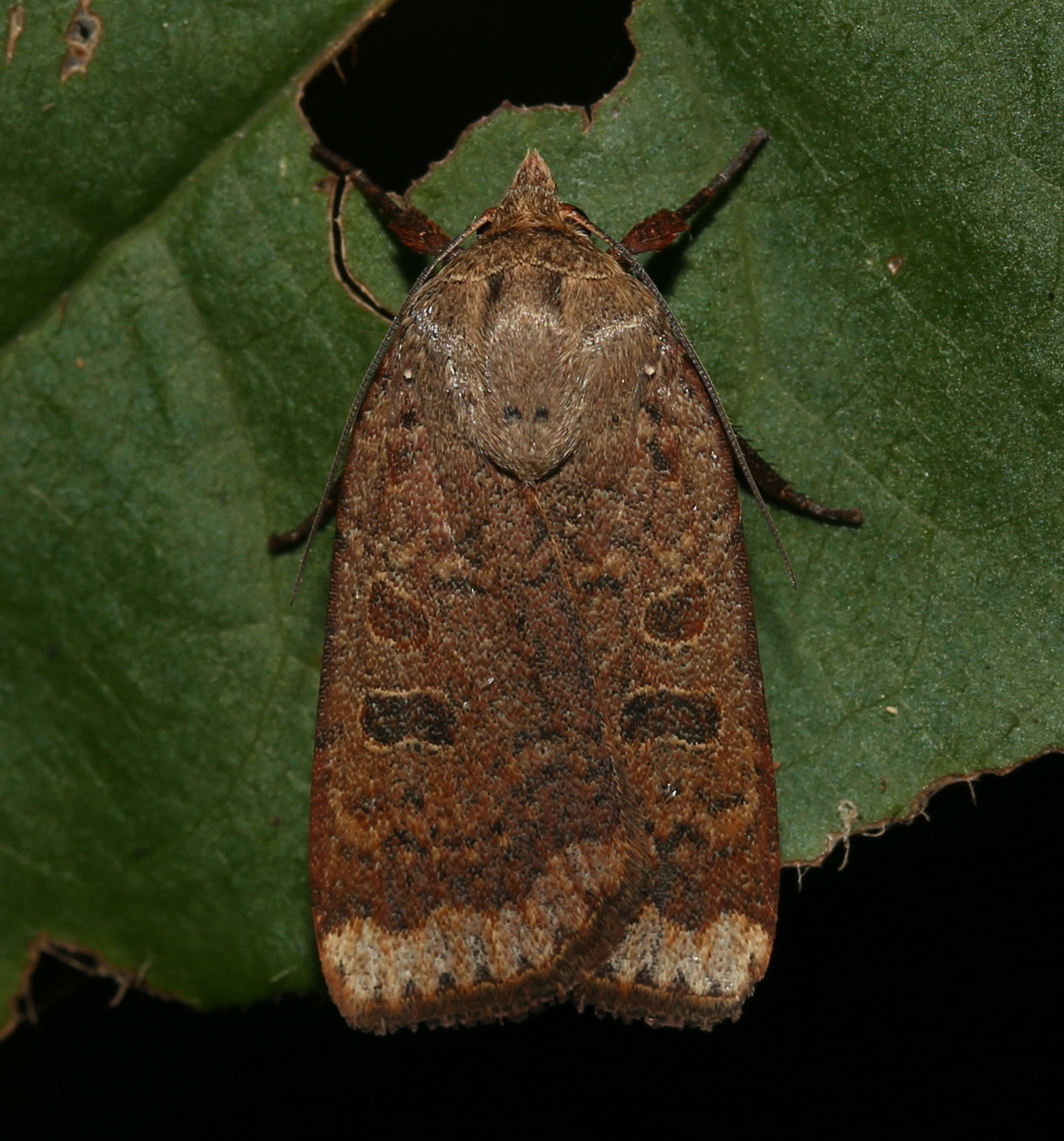

Conservation status
- Secure (NatureServe)

Scientific classification
- Kingdom: Animalia
- Phylum: Arthropoda
- Clade: Pancrustacea
- Class: Insecta
- Order: Lepidoptera
- Superfamily: Noctuoidea
- Family: Noctuidae
- Genus: Abagrotis
- Species: A. alternata

Binomial name
- Abagrotis alternata Grote, 1865

Synonyms
- Abagrotis alternatella; Abagrotis uniformis

= Abagrotis alternata =

Species of moth

Abagrotis alternata, the greater red dart or mottled gray cutworm, is a moth of the family Noctuidae. The species was first described by Augustus Radcliffe Grote in 1865. It is found in eastern North America, from New Brunswick west across southern Canada to western Alberta, south to Arizona, New Mexico and the Gulf of Mexico.

The wingspan is 38–43 mm. Adults are on wing in August in Alberta. There is one generation per year.
