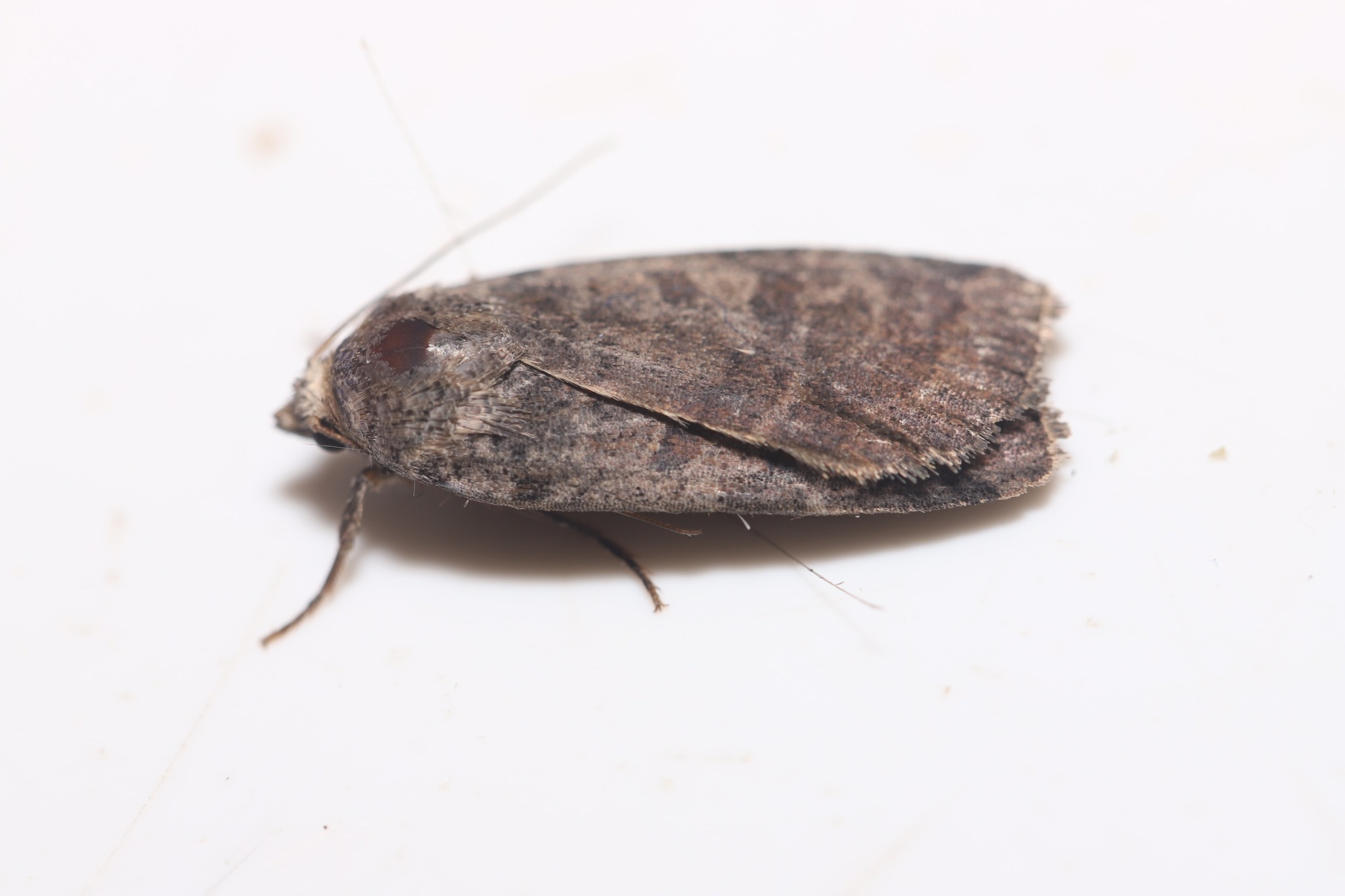
- Abagrotis placida, Alaska

Scientific classification
- Kingdom: Animalia
- Phylum: Arthropoda
- Clade: Pancrustacea
- Class: Insecta
- Order: Lepidoptera
- Superfamily: Noctuoidea
- Family: Noctuidae
- Genus: Abagrotis
- Species: A. placida

Binomial name
- Abagrotis placida (Grote, 1876)

= Abagrotis placida =

Species of moth

Abagrotis placida, the red cutworm, is a species of cutworm or dart moth in the family Noctuidae. It is found in North America.

The MONA or Hodges number for Abagrotis placida is 11041.
