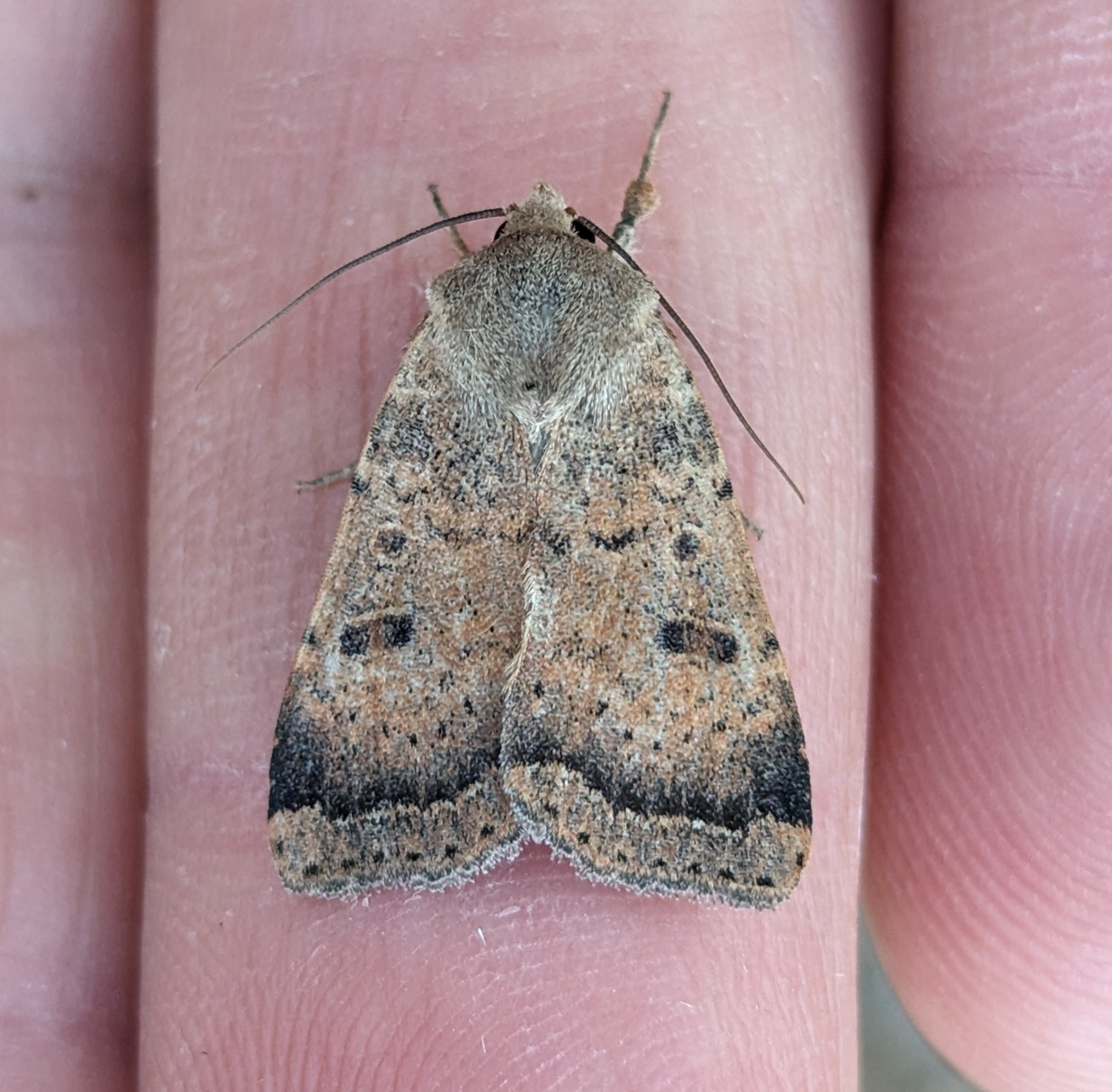
- Abagrotis trigona, Canada

Scientific classification
- Domain: Eukaryota
- Kingdom: Animalia
- Phylum: Arthropoda
- Class: Insecta
- Order: Lepidoptera
- Superfamily: Noctuoidea
- Family: Noctuidae
- Genus: Abagrotis
- Species: A. trigona

Binomial name
- Abagrotis trigona Smith, 1893

Synonyms
- Abagrotis sambo

= Abagrotis trigona =

Luteous dart

Species of moth

Abagrotis trigona, the luteous dart, is a moth of the family Noctuidae. The species was first described by Smith in 1893. It is found in North America from western South Dakota and south-western Manitoba west across southern Saskatchewan and Alberta to Vancouver Island, south to the Mexican border. There is also a disjunct population in Ohio.

The wingspan is 28–30 mm. Adults are on wing in August.
