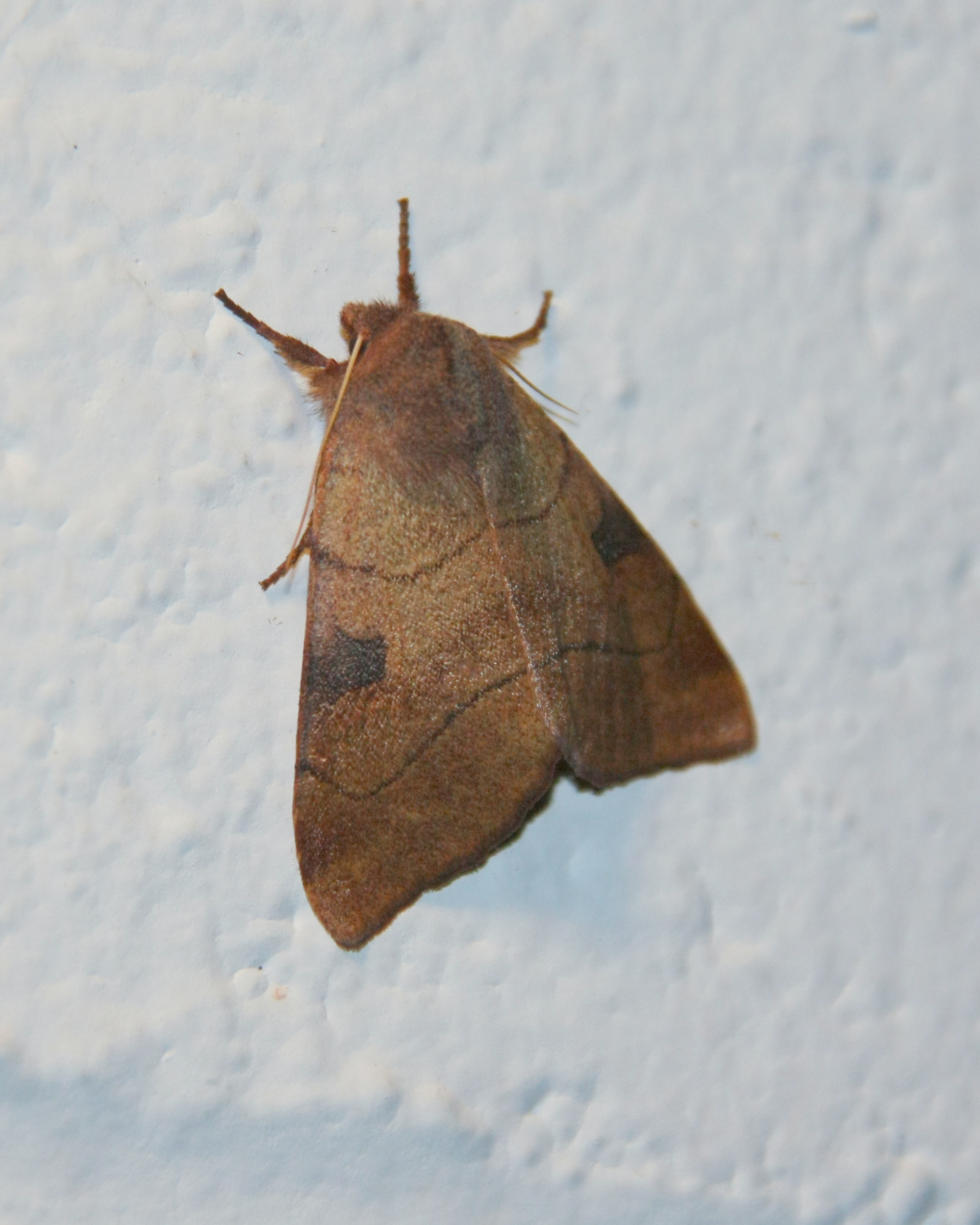
- Bent-line dart (Choephora fungorum)

Scientific classification
- Kingdom: Animalia
- Phylum: Arthropoda
- Class: Insecta
- Order: Lepidoptera
- Superfamily: Noctuoidea
- Family: Noctuidae
- Subtribe: Noctuina
- Genus: Choephora; Grote & Robinson, 1868

= Choephora =

Genus of moths

Choephora is a genus of moths of the family Noctuidae.

== Species ==
- Choephora fungorum Grote & Robinson, 1868
