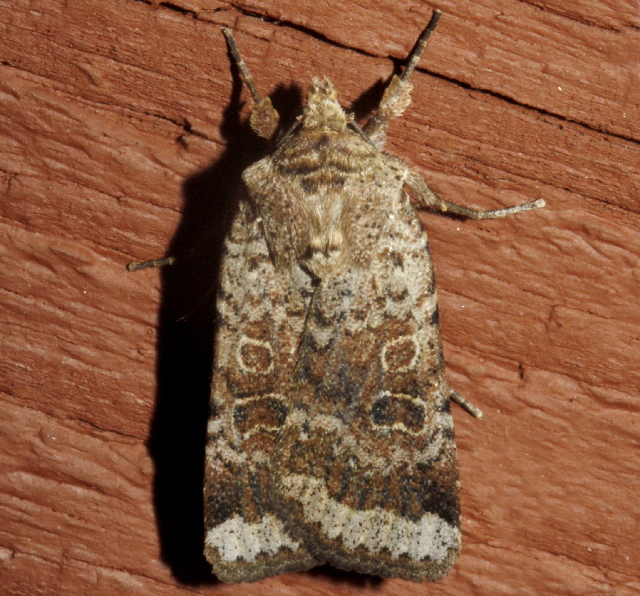

Scientific classification
- Kingdom: Animalia
- Phylum: Arthropoda
- Class: Insecta
- Order: Lepidoptera
- Superfamily: Noctuoidea
- Family: Noctuidae
- Genus: Abagrotis
- Species: A. scopeops

Binomial name
- Abagrotis scopeops Dyar, 1904

Synonyms
- Abagrotis tecatensis Buckett, 1968

= Abagrotis scopeops =

Species of moth

Abagrotis scopeops is a moth of the family Noctuidae first described by Harrison Gray Dyar Jr. in 1904. It is found in North America from southern British Columbia, south through western Montana, Idaho, Utah and Nevada down to southern California.

The wingspan is about 36 mm. Adults are on wing in early fall.
