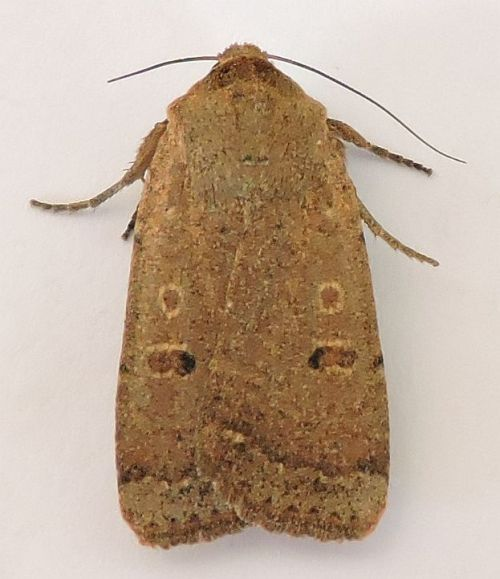
- Abagrotis orbis, Arizona

Scientific classification
- Kingdom: Animalia
- Phylum: Arthropoda
- Clade: Pancrustacea
- Class: Insecta
- Order: Lepidoptera
- Superfamily: Noctuoidea
- Family: Noctuidae
- Genus: Abagrotis
- Species: A. orbis

Binomial name
- Abagrotis orbis (Grote, 1876)

Synonyms
- Agrotis orbis Grote 1876; Lampra barnesi Benjamin, 1921; Abagrotis barnesi (Benjamin, 1921)

= Abagrotis orbis =

Species of moth

Abagrotis orbis, the well-marked cutworm or Barnes' climbing cutworm, is a moth of the family Noctuidae. The species was first described by Augustus Radcliffe Grote in 1876. It is in southwestern North America, extending eastward across the plains and with a large disjunct population in dune habitats in the southern Great Lakes area. It extends into western Canada only in the southern interior of British Columbia and southern Alberta and Saskatchewan.

The wingspan is 35–40 mm. Adults are on wing from August to September in one generation in Alberta.

The larvae feed on the flowers of fruit trees and are considered a pest in orchards. Recorded food plants include Malus sylvestris, Prunus persica, Prunus serotina, Acer negundo and Vitis sp.
