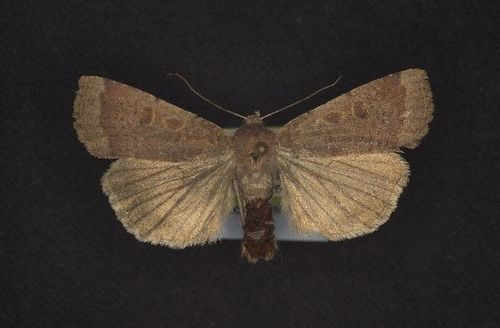

Scientific classification
- Kingdom: Animalia
- Phylum: Arthropoda
- Class: Insecta
- Order: Lepidoptera
- Superfamily: Noctuoidea
- Family: Noctuidae
- Genus: Abagrotis
- Species: A. hermina

Binomial name
- Abagrotis hermina Lafontaine, 1998

= Abagrotis hermina =

Species of moth

Abagrotis hermina is a moth of the family Noctuidae first described by J. Donald Lafontaine in 1998. It is found in Canada (Manitoba, Saskatchewan, Alberta and British Columbia) and the United States, including Utah and California.

The wingspan is about 31 mm.
