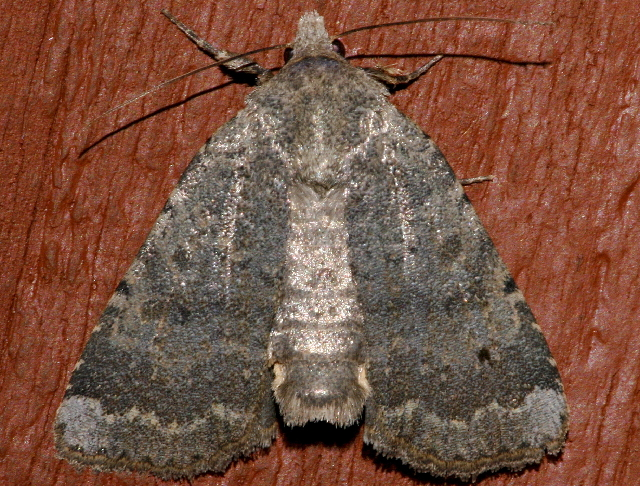

Scientific classification
- Kingdom: Animalia
- Phylum: Arthropoda
- Class: Insecta
- Order: Lepidoptera
- Superfamily: Noctuoidea
- Family: Noctuidae
- Genus: Abagrotis
- Species: A. variata

Binomial name
- Abagrotis variata Grote, 1876

Synonyms
- Abagrotis varix

= Abagrotis variata =

Species of moth

Abagrotis variata is a species of moth in the family Noctuidae that was first described by Augustus Radcliffe Grote in 1876. It is found in North America from British Columbia to California, east to New Mexico and Alberta.

The wingspan is about 36–42 mm. Adults are on wing from August to September, but may be as early as June depending on the location.

The larvae feed on flowering trees and shrubs, preferably willow.
