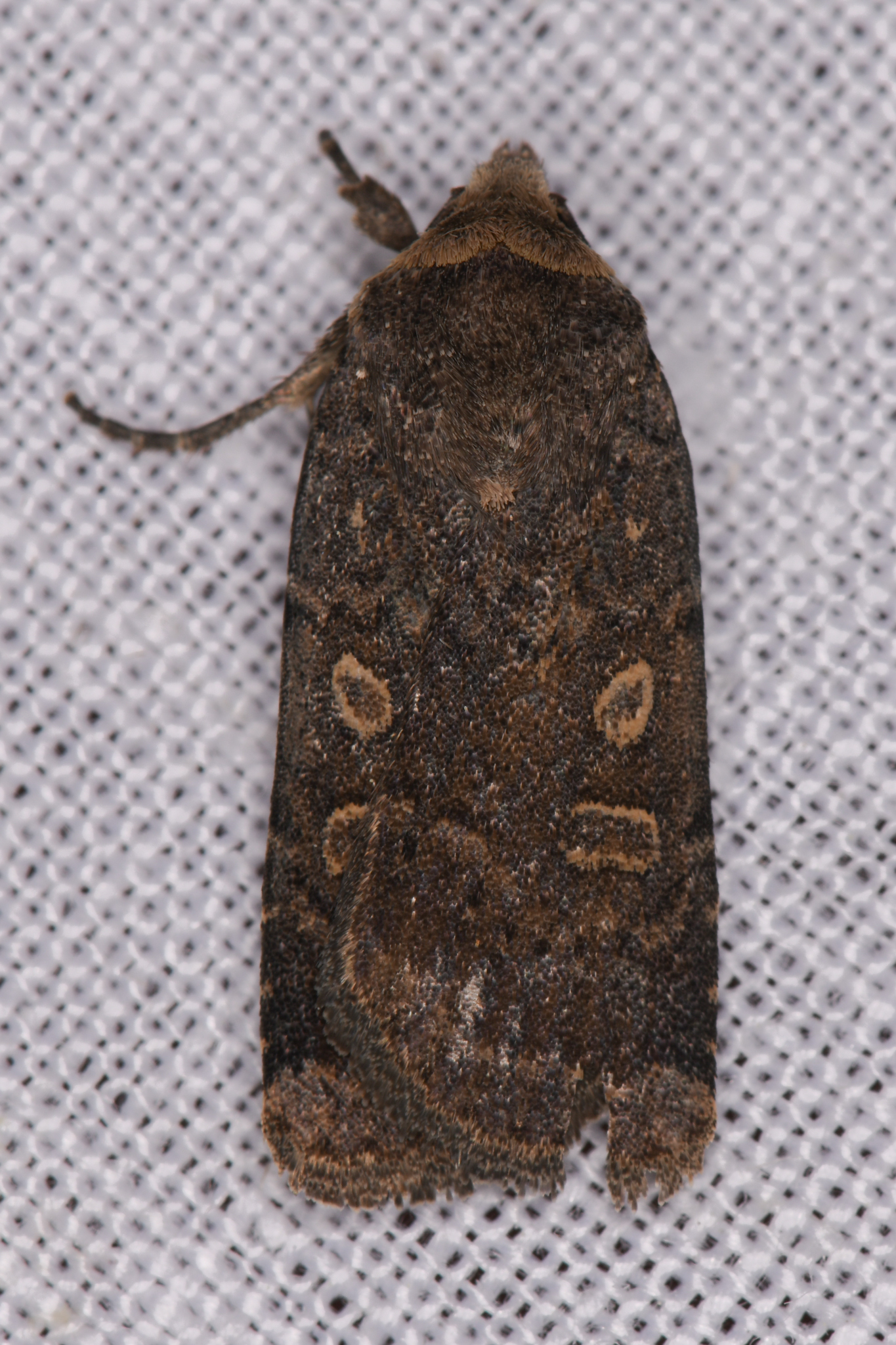
- Abagrotis duanca, California

Conservation status
- Apparently Secure (NatureServe)

Scientific classification
- Kingdom: Animalia
- Phylum: Arthropoda
- Clade: Pancrustacea
- Class: Insecta
- Order: Lepidoptera
- Superfamily: Noctuoidea
- Family: Noctuidae
- Genus: Abagrotis
- Species: A. duanca

Binomial name
- Abagrotis duanca Smith, 1908

= Abagrotis duanca =

Species of moth

Abagrotis duanca is a moth of the family Noctuidae first described by Smith in 1908. It is found in the Pacific Northwest of North America. In Alberta it has been collected only in the extreme southeastern corner.

The wingspan is about 28 mm. Adults are on wing from June to July in one generation in Alberta.

Reported food plants include Artemisia tridentata.
