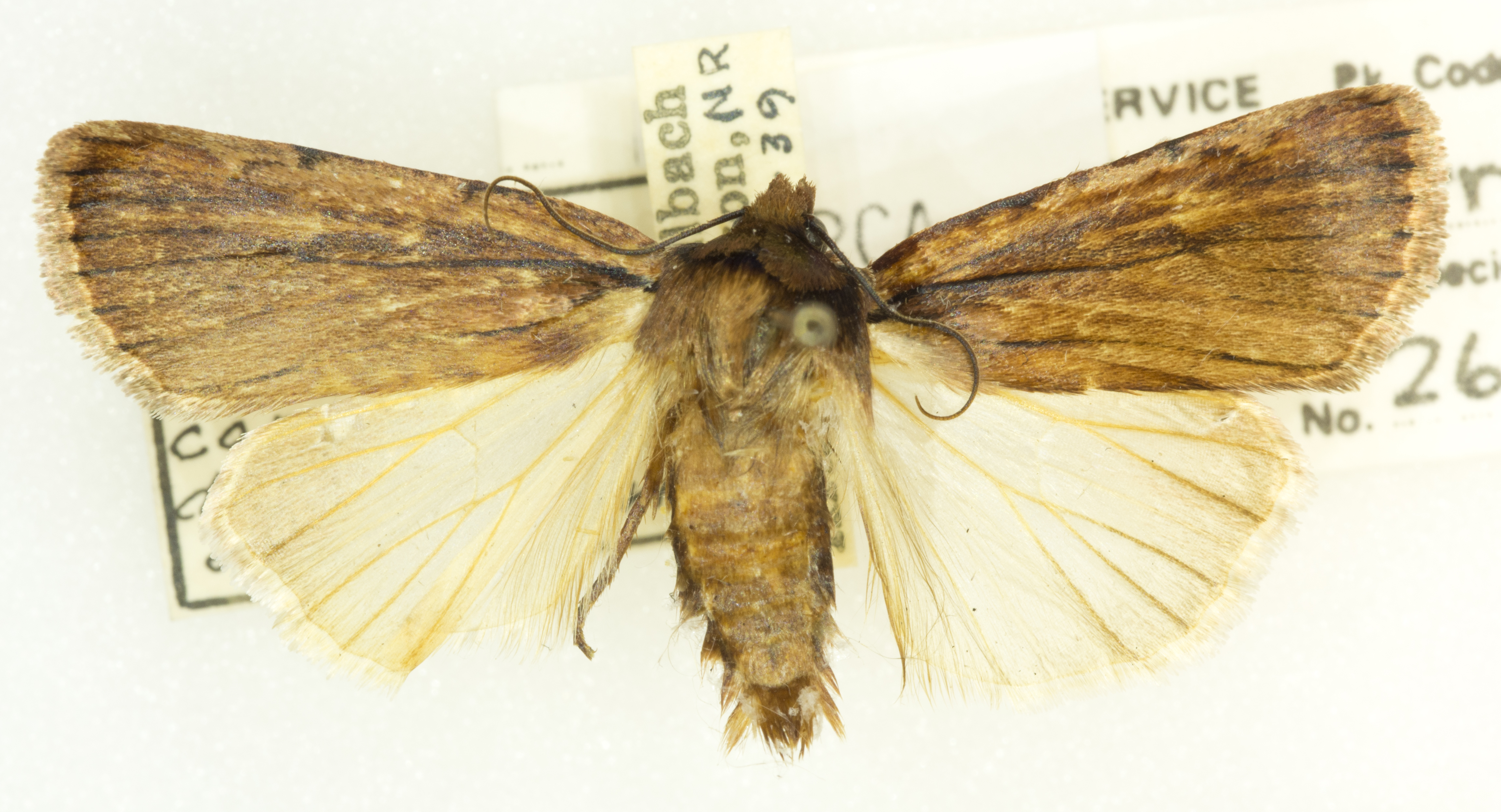

Scientific classification
- Kingdom: Animalia
- Phylum: Arthropoda
- Clade: Pancrustacea
- Class: Insecta
- Order: Lepidoptera
- Superfamily: Noctuoidea
- Family: Noctuidae
- Genus: Tesagrotis
- Species: T. corrodera

Binomial name
- Tesagrotis corrodera (Smith, 1907)

= Tesagrotis corrodera =

Species of moth

Tesagrotis corrodera is a species of cutworm or dart moth in the family Noctuidae. It was described by Smith in 1907 and is found in North America.

The MONA or Hodges number for Tesagrotis corrodera is 10978.1.
