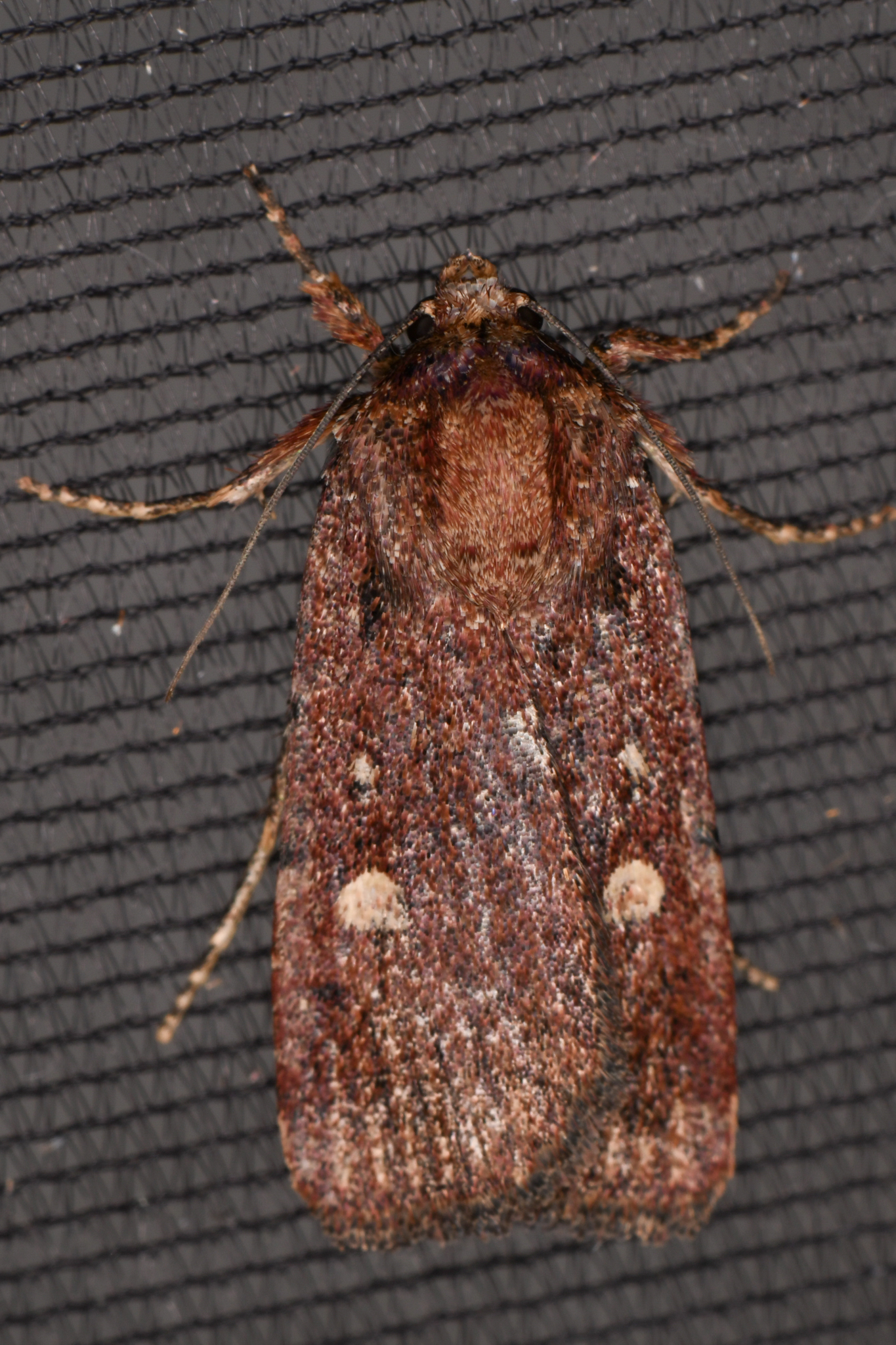
- Abagrotis rubricundis, California

Scientific classification
- Domain: Eukaryota
- Kingdom: Animalia
- Phylum: Arthropoda
- Class: Insecta
- Order: Lepidoptera
- Superfamily: Noctuoidea
- Family: Noctuidae
- Genus: Abagrotis
- Species: A. rubricundis

Binomial name
- Abagrotis rubricundis Buckett, 1968

= Abagrotis rubricundis =

Species of moth

Abagrotis rubricundis is a moth of the family Noctuidae. It is found in the mountains of California and south-western Oregon.

The wingspan is about 38 mm.
