= Abagrotis vittifrons =

Scientific classification
- Kingdom: Animalia
- Phylum: Arthropoda
- Class: Insecta
- Order: Lepidoptera
- Superfamily: Noctuoidea
- Family: Noctuidae
- Genus: Abagrotis
- Species: A. vittifrons

Binomial name
- Abagrotis vittifrons Grote, 1864

Species of moth

Abagrotis vittifrons is a moth of the family Noctuidae first described by Augustus Radcliffe Grote in 1864. It is found in North America from eastern North Dakota and south-western Saskatchewan west to the southern interior of British Columbia, south to southern California, Arizona and New Mexico.

The wingspan is about 34–35 mm. Adults are on wing from August to September in one generation depending on the location.
