= Parabagrotis cupidissima =

Scientific classification
- Kingdom: Animalia
- Phylum: Arthropoda
- Clade: Pancrustacea
- Class: Insecta
- Order: Lepidoptera
- Superfamily: Noctuoidea
- Family: Noctuidae
- Genus: Parabagrotis
- Species: P. cupidissima

Binomial name
- Parabagrotis cupidissima (Grote, 1875)

Synonyms
- Agrotis cupidissima Grote, 1875; Agrotis laetula Grote, 1876; Rhynchagrotis distracta Smith, 1890

Species of moth

Parabagrotis cupidissima is a species of moth in the family Noctuidae (owlet moths). It was described by Augustus Radcliffe Grote in 1875 and is found in North America, where it ranges from southern Vancouver Island, along the Pacific Coast states, to southern California. The habitat consists of grasslands and oak woodlands.

The length of the forewings is 15–18 mm.

The larvae probably feed on Poaceae species.

The MONA or Hodges number for Parabagrotis cupidissima is 11047.3.
