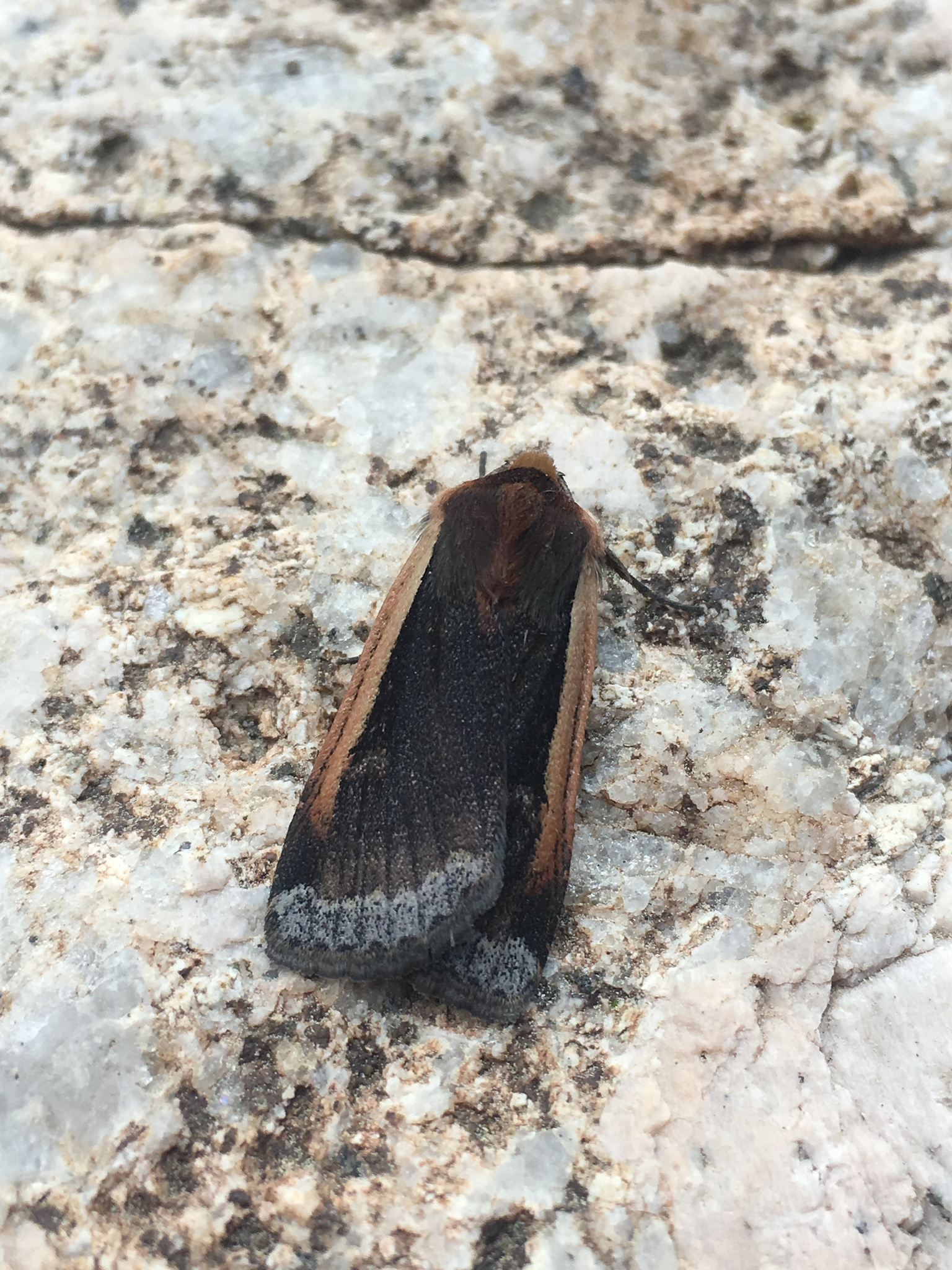

Scientific classification
- Kingdom: Animalia
- Phylum: Arthropoda
- Clade: Pancrustacea
- Class: Insecta
- Order: Lepidoptera
- Superfamily: Noctuoidea
- Family: Noctuidae
- Genus: Abagrotis
- Species: A. bimarginalis

Binomial name
- Abagrotis bimarginalis (Grote, 1883)

= Abagrotis bimarginalis =

Species of moth

Abagrotis bimarginalis is a species of cutworm or dart moth in the family Noctuidae. It is found in Central America and North America.

The MONA or Hodges number for Abagrotis bimarginalis is 11017.
