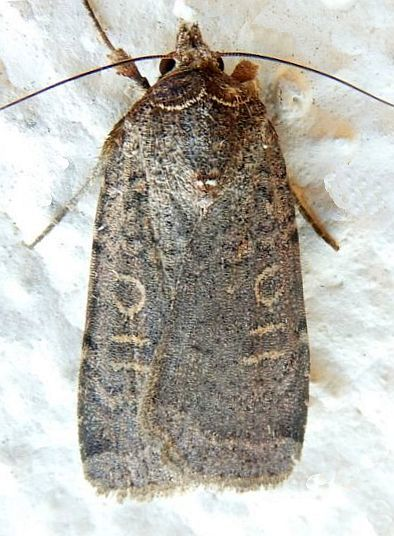
- Abagrotis alampeta, Arizona

Scientific classification
- Kingdom: Animalia
- Phylum: Arthropoda
- Class: Insecta
- Order: Lepidoptera
- Superfamily: Noctuoidea
- Family: Noctuidae
- Genus: Abagrotis
- Species: A. alampeta

Binomial name
- Abagrotis alampeta Franclemont, 1967

= Abagrotis alampeta =

Species of moth

Abagrotis alampeta is a moth of the family Noctuidae. It is found in North America, including Arizona, New Mexico, California and Mexico.

The wingspan is about 33 mm.
