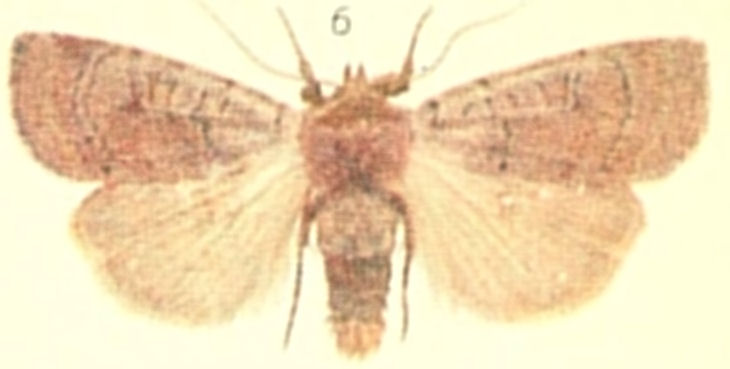

Scientific classification
- Domain: Eukaryota
- Kingdom: Animalia
- Phylum: Arthropoda
- Class: Insecta
- Order: Lepidoptera
- Superfamily: Noctuoidea
- Family: Noctuidae
- Subtribe: Noctuina
- Genus: Protolampra; McDunnough, 1929

= Protolampra =

Genus of moths

Protolampra is a genus of moths of the family Noctuidae.

== Species ==
- Protolampra brunneicollis (Grote, 1864)
- Protolampra hero (Morrison, 1876)
- Protolampra rufipectus (Morrison, 1875)
- Protolampra sobrina (Duponchel, 1843)
