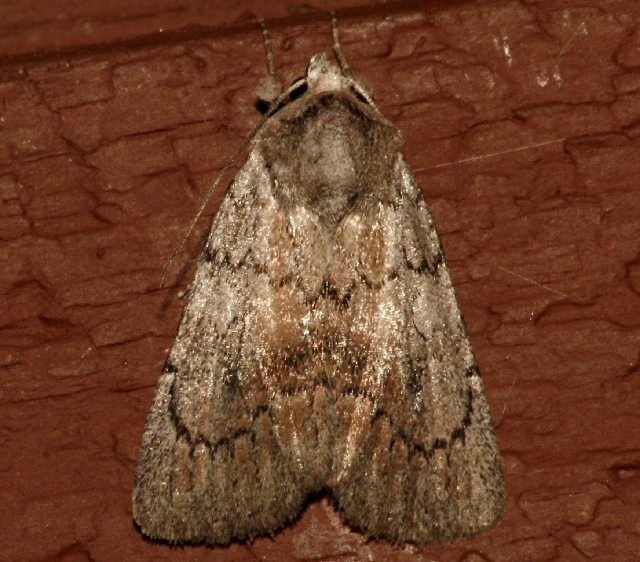

Scientific classification
- Kingdom: Animalia
- Phylum: Arthropoda
- Clade: Pancrustacea
- Class: Insecta
- Order: Lepidoptera
- Superfamily: Noctuoidea
- Family: Noctuidae
- Genus: Setagrotis
- Species: S. pallidicollis

Binomial name
- Setagrotis pallidicollis (Grote, 1880)

Synonyms
- Setagrotis planifrons (Smith, 1890)

= Setagrotis pallidicollis =

Species of moth

Setagrotis pallidicollis is a species of cutworm or dart moth in the family Noctuidae. It is found in North America.
