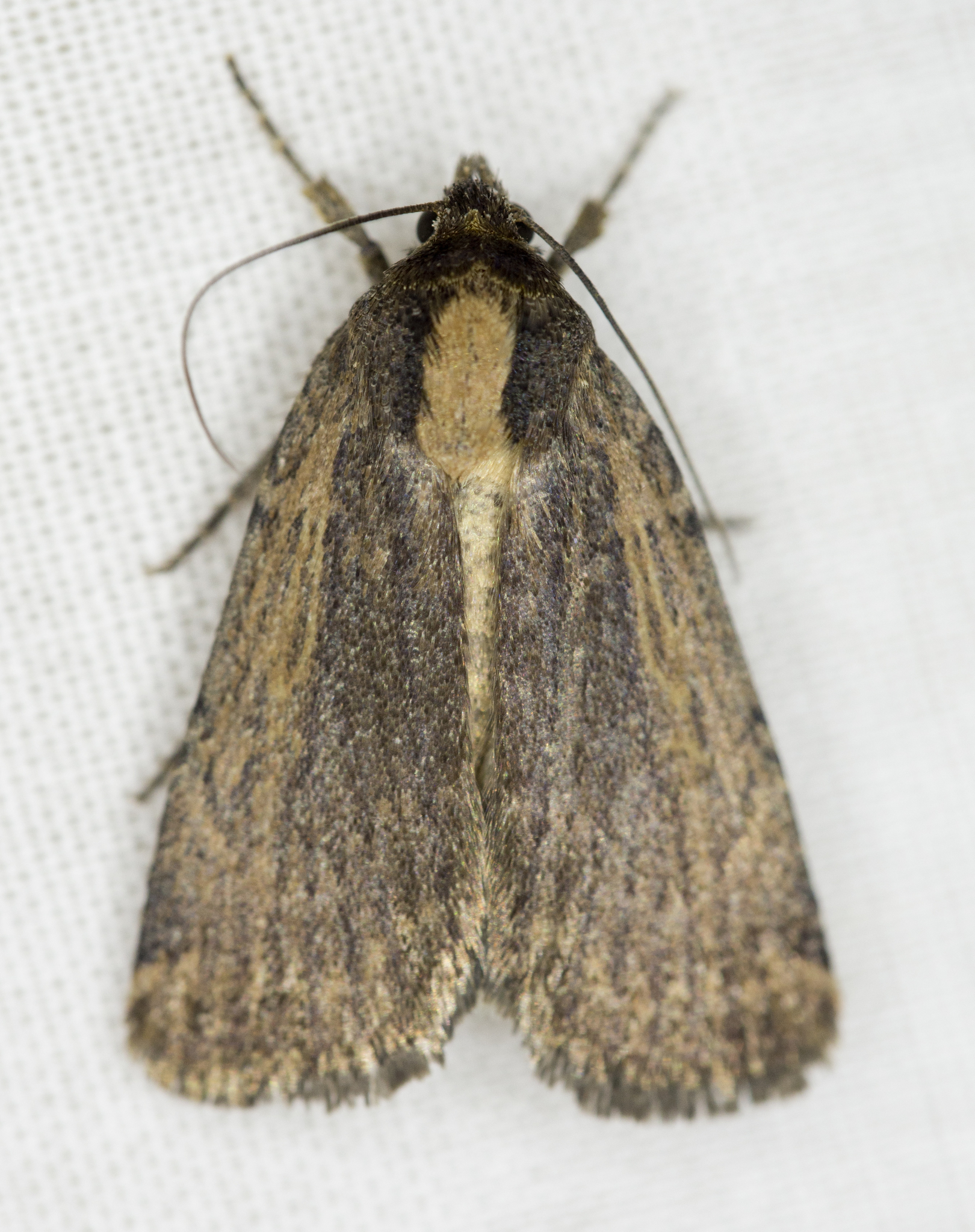
- In Utah

Scientific classification
- Kingdom: Animalia
- Phylum: Arthropoda
- Clade: Pancrustacea
- Class: Insecta
- Order: Lepidoptera
- Superfamily: Noctuoidea
- Family: Noctuidae
- Genus: Abagrotis
- Species: A. nanalis

Binomial name
- Abagrotis nanalis Grote, 1881

Synonyms
- Abagrotis mantalini

= Abagrotis nanalis =

Species of moth

Abagrotis nanalis is a species of moth in the family Noctuidae that was first described by Augustus Radcliffe Grote in 1881. It is found in North America from southern British Columbia east to southwest Saskatchewan and western North Dakota, south to northern New Mexico and California.

The wingspan is about 25 mm. Adults are on wing from August to September in one generation in Alberta.
