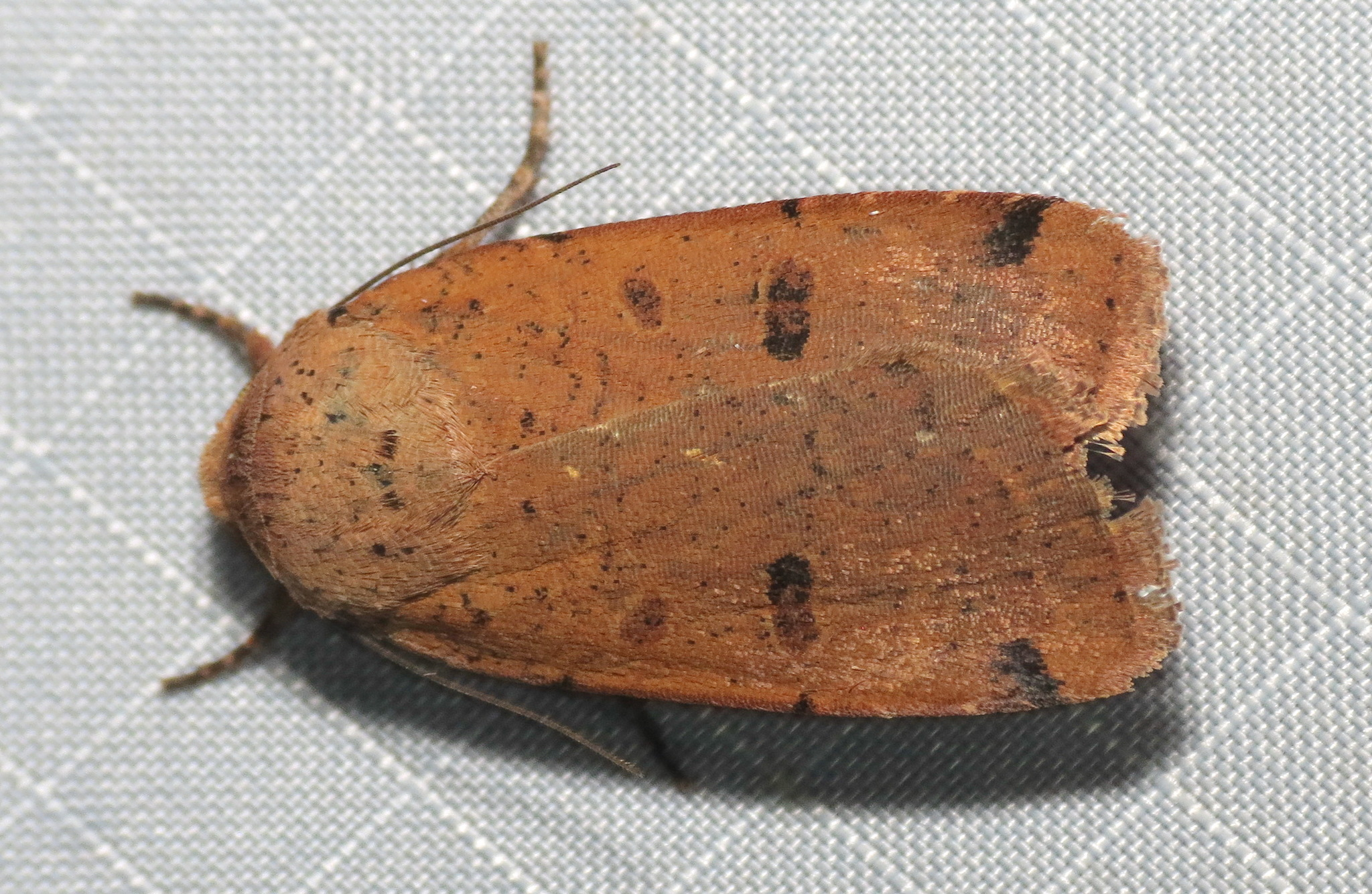

Conservation status
- Apparently Secure (NatureServe)

Scientific classification
- Kingdom: Animalia
- Phylum: Arthropoda
- Clade: Pancrustacea
- Class: Insecta
- Order: Lepidoptera
- Superfamily: Noctuoidea
- Family: Noctuidae
- Genus: Abagrotis
- Species: A. cupida

Binomial name
- Abagrotis cupida Grote, 1865

Synonyms
- Rynchagrotis cupida

= Abagrotis cupida =

Cupid dart

Species of moth

Abagrotis cupida, the Cupid dart or brown climbing cutworm, is a moth of the family Noctuidae. The species was first described by Augustus Radcliffe Grote in 1865. It is found in southern Canada and in the United States east of the Rocky Mountains (except the Deep South).

The wingspan is 33–35 mm. Adults are on wing in late summer in one generation. In Alberta, the flight period ranges from August to September.

Reported food plants include willow, cultivated apple, grape and peach trees.
