= Abagrotis erratica =

Scientific classification
- Domain: Eukaryota
- Kingdom: Animalia
- Phylum: Arthropoda
- Class: Insecta
- Order: Lepidoptera
- Superfamily: Noctuoidea
- Family: Noctuidae
- Genus: Abagrotis
- Species: A. erratica

Binomial name
- Abagrotis erratica Smith, 1890

Synonyms
- Agrotis erratica

Species of moth

Abagrotis erratica is a species of moth in the family Noctuidae. It was first described by Smith in 1890. It is found in North America from southern British Columbia including Vancouver Island south to central Utah and central California. It is also found in extreme southern Alberta.

The wingspan is 35–38 mm. Adults are on wing in August in Alberta. There is one generation per year.
