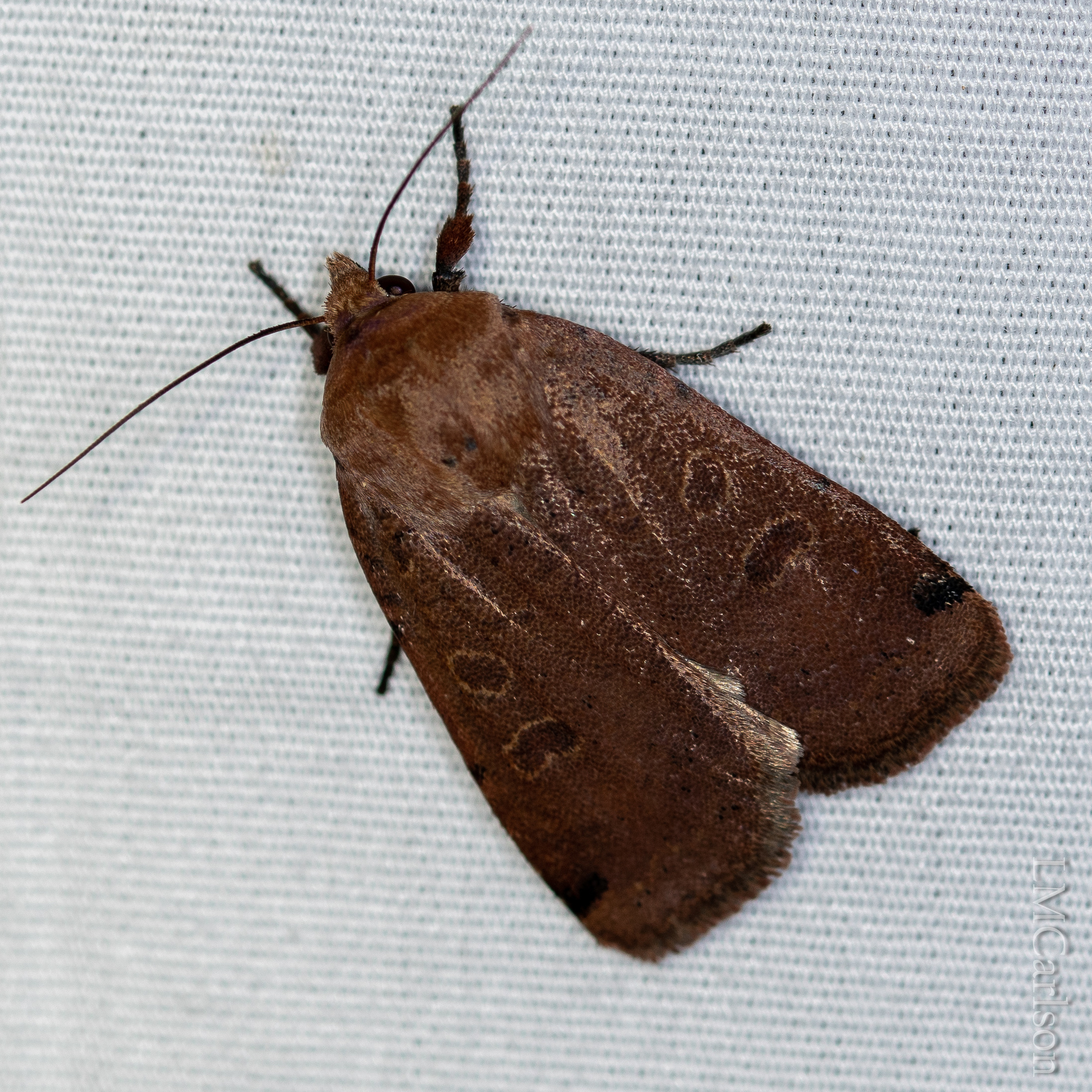
- Abagrotis magnicupida, North Carolina

Scientific classification
- Kingdom: Animalia
- Phylum: Arthropoda
- Clade: Pancrustacea
- Class: Insecta
- Order: Lepidoptera
- Superfamily: Noctuoidea
- Family: Noctuidae
- Genus: Abagrotis
- Species: A. magnicupida

Binomial name
- Abagrotis magnicupida Lafontaine, 1998

= Abagrotis magnicupida =

Species of moth

Abagrotis magnicupida, the one-dotted dart, is a moth of the family Noctuidae. The species was first described by J. Donald Lafontaine in 1998. It is found from southern Massachusetts west to Illinois, eastern Missouri and central Nebraska, south to North Carolina, Tennessee, northern Mississippi and eastern Texas.

The wingspan is about 40 mm. Adults are on wing in September. There is one generation per year.

The larvae are general feeders on both herbaceous and (in spring) woody plants. Larvae have been reared on Prunus virginiana.
