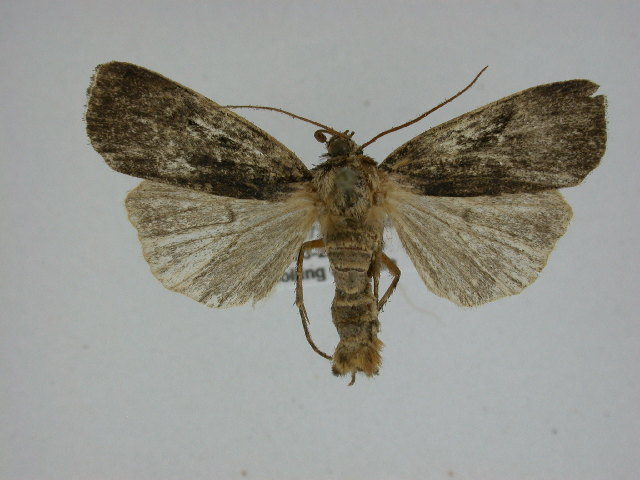

Scientific classification
- Kingdom: Animalia
- Phylum: Arthropoda
- Class: Insecta
- Order: Lepidoptera
- Superfamily: Noctuoidea
- Family: Noctuidae
- Genus: Pseudohermonassa
- Species: P. bicarnea

Binomial name
- Pseudohermonassa bicarnea (Guenée, 1852)

Synonyms
- Noctua bicarnea Guenée, 1852; Xestia bicarnea (Guenée, 1852)

= Pseudohermonassa bicarnea =

Species of moth

Pseudohermonassa bicarnea, the pink-spotted dart, is a moth of the family Noctuidae. The species was first described by Achille Guenée in 1852. It is found in eastern North America, and as far west as south-central Saskatchewan and central North Dakota, south to western North Carolina. It has recently been recorded from Tennessee.

The wingspan is 32–43 mm. Adults are on wing from July to October. There is one generation per year.

The larvae probably feed on Glyceria maxima and Glyceria canadensis. Older records list Vaccinium, Betula populifolia, Taraxacum officinale, Acer and meadowsweet as food plants.
