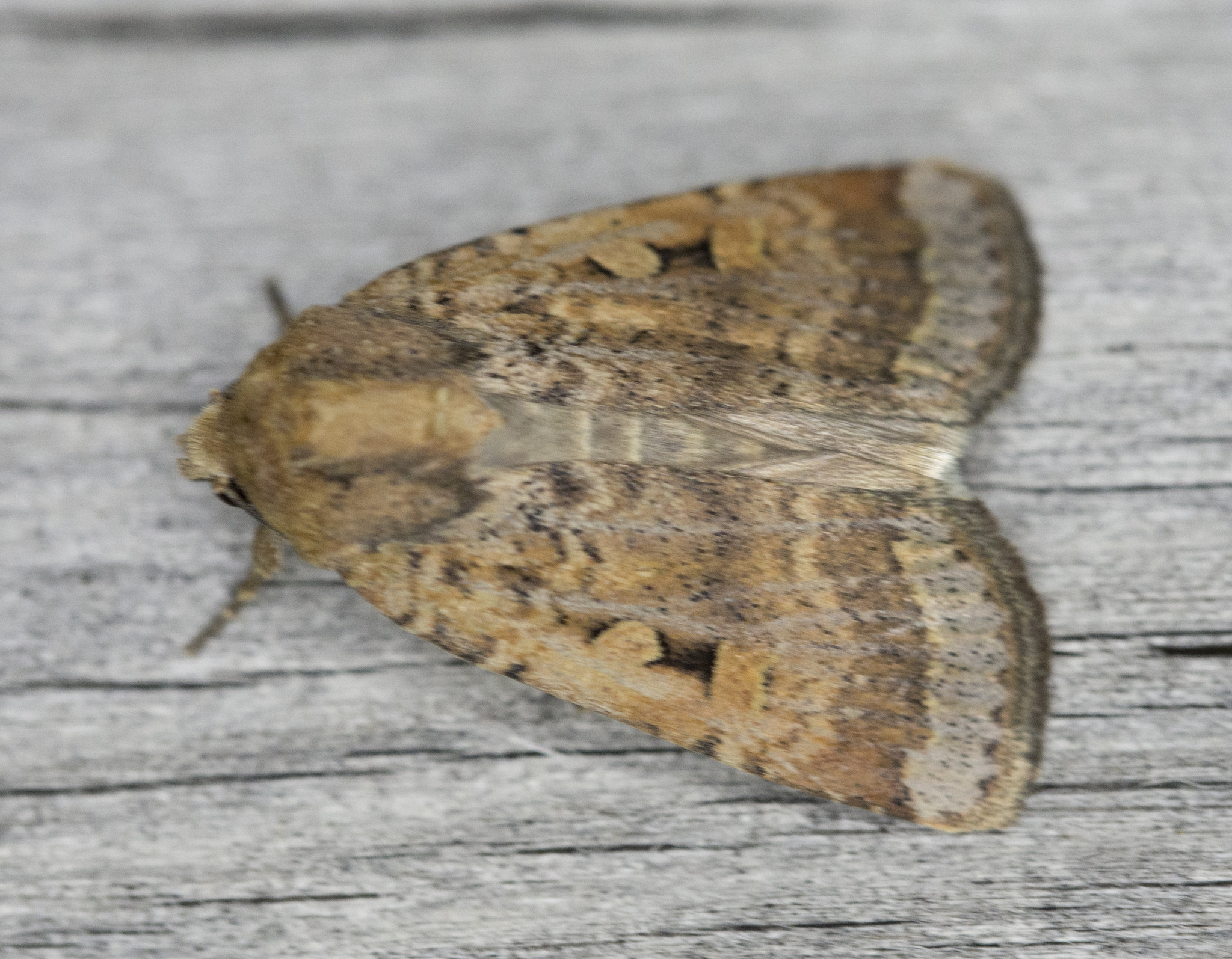
- Abagrotis discoidalis, Utah

Scientific classification
- Kingdom: Animalia
- Phylum: Arthropoda
- Class: Insecta
- Order: Lepidoptera
- Superfamily: Noctuoidea
- Family: Noctuidae
- Genus: Abagrotis
- Species: A. discoidalis

Binomial name
- Abagrotis discoidalis Grote, 1876

= Abagrotis discoidalis =

Species of moth

Abagrotis discoidalis is a moth of the family Noctuidae first described by Augustus Radcliffe Grote in 1876. It is found North America in Washington, Oregon and California, west to northern Arizona and New Mexico, Colorado and north into southern Alberta.

The wingspan is about 31 mm. Adults are on wing from June to August in Alberta. There is one generation per year.
