= Hemipachnobia =

Scientific classification
- Kingdom: Animalia
- Phylum: Arthropoda
- Clade: Pancrustacea
- Class: Insecta
- Order: Lepidoptera
- Superfamily: Noctuoidea
- Family: Noctuidae
- Subtribe: Noctuina
- Genus: Hemipachnobia; McDunnough, 1929

Genus of moths

Hemipachnobia is a genus of moths of the family Noctuidae.

== Species ==
- Hemipachnobia monochromatea (Morrison, 1874)
- Hemipachnobia subporphyrea (Walker, 1858)
