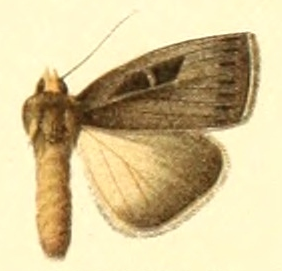

Scientific classification
- Kingdom: Animalia
- Phylum: Arthropoda
- Class: Insecta
- Order: Lepidoptera
- Superfamily: Noctuoidea
- Family: Noctuidae
- Genus: Pseudohermonassa
- Species: P. ononensis

Binomial name
- Pseudohermonassa ononensis (Bremer, 1861)

Synonyms
- Pseudohermonassa scaramangoides; Xestia scaramangoides (Barnes & Benjamin, 1926); Euxoa ononensis

= Pseudohermonassa ononensis =

Species of moth

Pseudohermonassa ononensis is a moth of the family Noctuidae. It is found in the Southern Siberian Mountains, Kyrgyzstan and Alaska.

The length of the fore wings is about 16 mm.

== Subspecies ==
- Pseudohermonassa ononensis ononensis (Bremer, 1861) (southern Siberian Mountains)
- Pseudohermonassa ononensis scaramangae (Alpheraky, 1882) (Kyrghyzstan)
