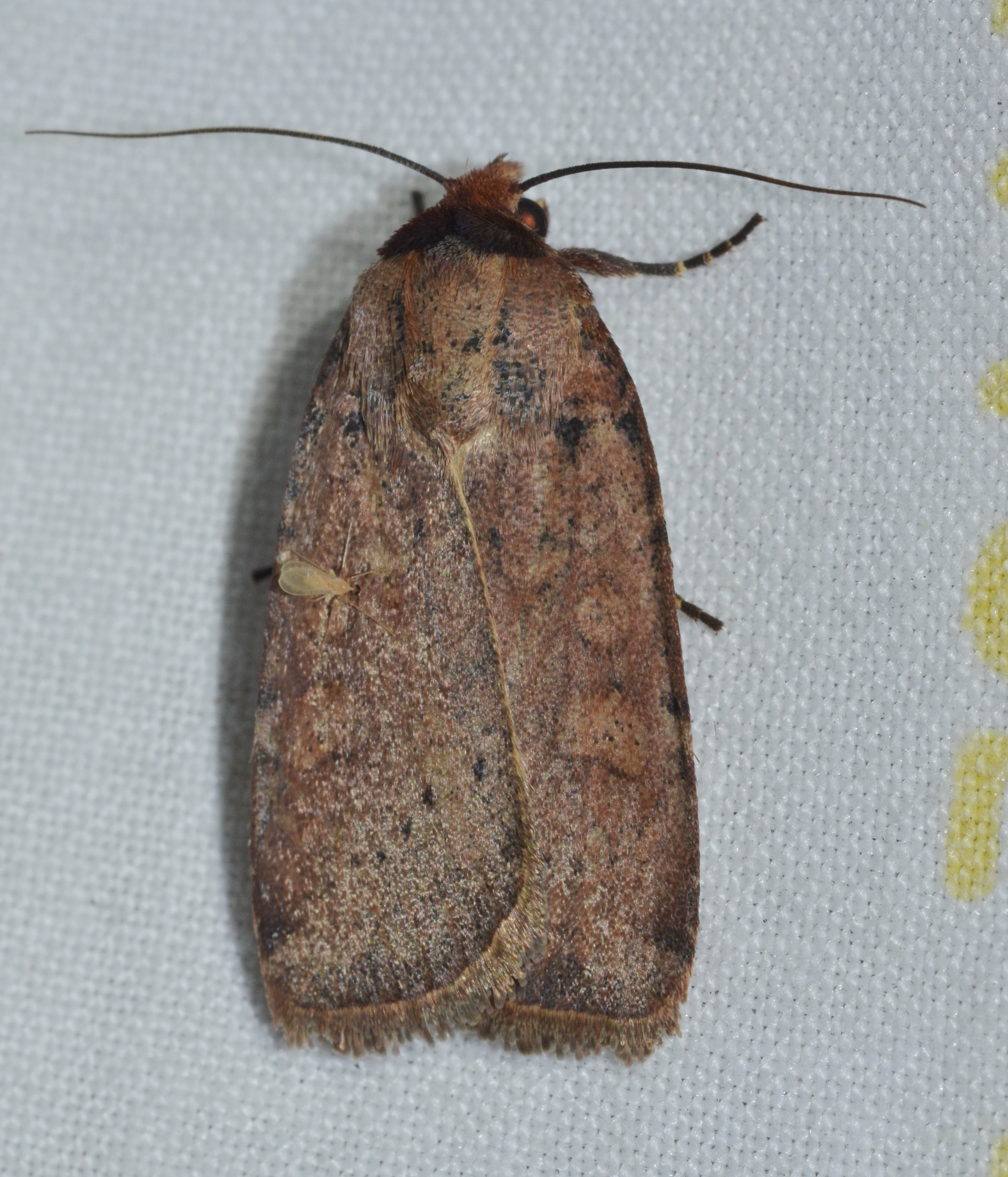

Scientific classification
- Kingdom: Animalia
- Phylum: Arthropoda
- Class: Insecta
- Order: Lepidoptera
- Superfamily: Noctuoidea
- Family: Noctuidae
- Genus: Protolampra
- Species: P. brunneicollis

Binomial name
- Protolampra brunneicollis (Grote, 1864)

Synonyms
- Noctua brunneicollis Grote, 1864

= Protolampra brunneicollis =

Species of moth

Protolampra brunneicollis, the brown-collared dart, is a moth of the family Noctuidae. The species was first described by Augustus Radcliffe Grote in 1864. It is found in eastern North America from New Brunswick to Alberta in southern Canada, and in the United States from Maine to North Carolina and Tennessee west to Mississippi, north to Minnesota, with scattered records in the west from North Dakota, South Dakota and Montana.

The wingspan is about 35 mm. Adults are on wing from June to September. There are possibly two generations per year or one with adults aestivating.

The larvae feed on a wide range of herbaceous and woody, low-growing plants including blueberry, clover, dandelion, sweet-fern, and tobacco. Larvae have been reared on Vaccinium, Taraxacum officinale and Comptonia peregrina.
