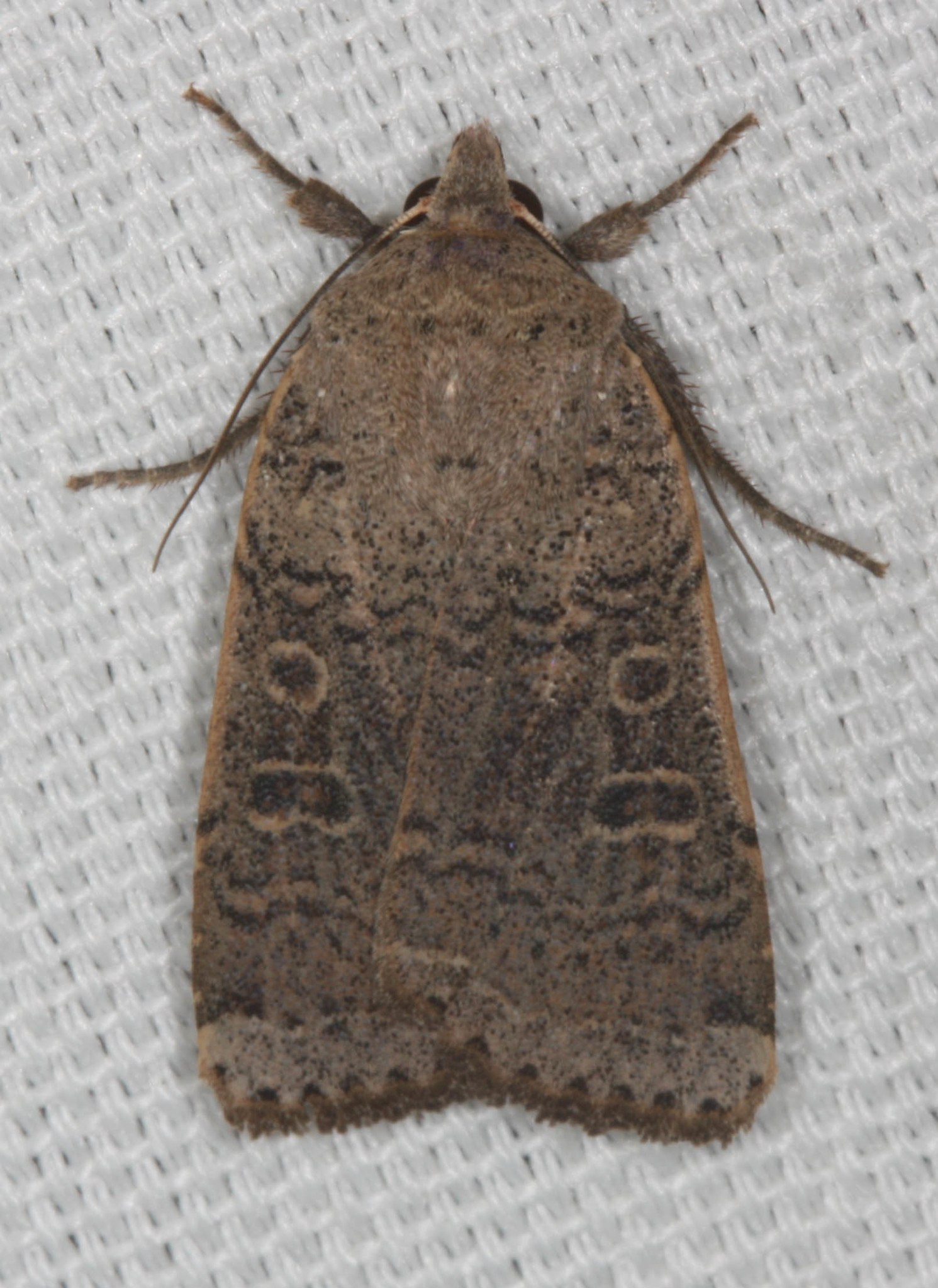
- Abagrotis denticulata, California

Scientific classification
- Kingdom: Animalia
- Phylum: Arthropoda
- Clade: Pancrustacea
- Class: Insecta
- Order: Lepidoptera
- Superfamily: Noctuoidea
- Family: Noctuidae
- Genus: Abagrotis
- Species: A. denticulata

Binomial name
- Abagrotis denticulata McDunnough, 1946

= Abagrotis denticulata =

Species of moth

Abagrotis denticulata is a species of cutworm or dart moth in the family Noctuidae. It is found in North America.

The MONA or Hodges number for Abagrotis denticulata is 11026.
