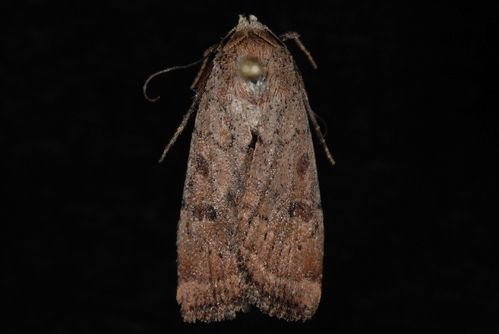

Scientific classification
- Kingdom: Animalia
- Phylum: Arthropoda
- Class: Insecta
- Order: Lepidoptera
- Superfamily: Noctuoidea
- Family: Noctuidae
- Genus: Abagrotis
- Species: A. dodi

Binomial name
- Abagrotis dodi McDunnough, 1927

= Abagrotis dodi =

Species of moth

Abagrotis dodi is a moth of the family Noctuidae first described by James Halliday McDunnough in 1927. It is found in North America southwest of Calgary, southern Yukon south to southern Utah and Colorado and west to central Nevada and Washington.

The wingspan is 24–25 mm. Adults are on wing in late summer in one generation per year.
