= Setagrotis vocalis =

Scientific classification
- Kingdom: Animalia
- Phylum: Arthropoda
- Class: Insecta
- Order: Lepidoptera
- Superfamily: Noctuoidea
- Family: Noctuidae
- Genus: Setagrotis
- Species: S. vocalis

Binomial name
- Setagrotis vocalis (Grote, 1879)

Species of moth

Setagrotis vocalis is a species of cutworm or dart moth in the family Noctuidae. It is found in North America.

The MONA or Hodges number for Setagrotis vocalis is 10975.1.
