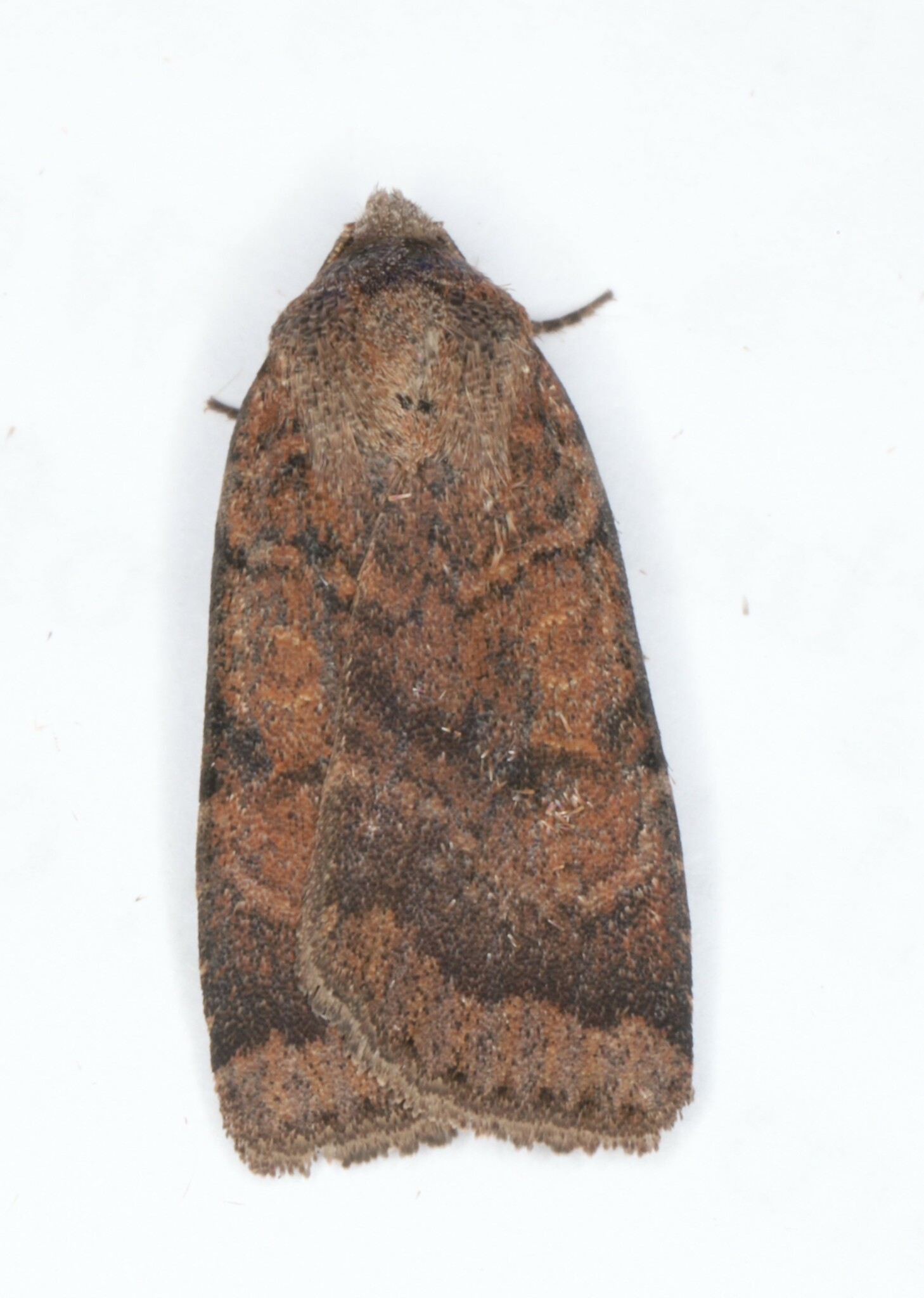
- Abagrotis brunneipennis, Canada

Conservation status
- Apparently Secure (NatureServe)

Scientific classification
- Kingdom: Animalia
- Phylum: Arthropoda
- Clade: Pancrustacea
- Class: Insecta
- Order: Lepidoptera
- Superfamily: Noctuoidea
- Family: Noctuidae
- Genus: Abagrotis
- Species: A. brunneipennis

Binomial name
- Abagrotis brunneipennis Grote, 1875

= Abagrotis brunneipennis =

Species of moth

Abagrotis brunneipennis, the Yankee dart, is a moth of the family Noctuidae. The species was first described by Augustus Radcliffe Grote in 1875. It is found in North America from Newfoundland west to Vancouver Island, south to west central Oregon, Utah, Colorado and North Carolina.

The wingspan is 33–37 mm (1.3–1.5 in). Adults are on wing in August to September in one generation.

The larvae feed on various woody plants, including Vaccinium. They also feed on fallen leaves during the winter.
