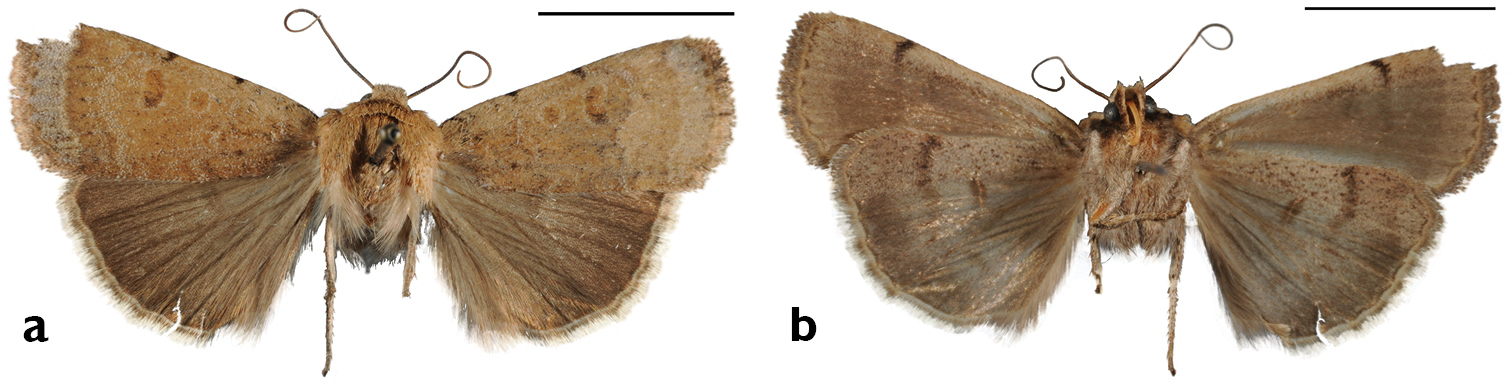

Scientific classification
- Domain: Eukaryota
- Kingdom: Animalia
- Phylum: Arthropoda
- Class: Insecta
- Order: Lepidoptera
- Superfamily: Noctuoidea
- Family: Noctuidae
- Genus: Abagrotis
- Species: A. nefascia

Binomial name
- Abagrotis nefascia Smith, 1908

Synonyms
- Abagrotis negascia; Abagrotis forbesi; Rhynchagrotis nefascia; Abagrotis crumbi Franclemont, 1955

= Abagrotis nefascia =

Species of moth

Abagrotis nefascia is a moth of the family Noctuidae first described by Smith in 1908. It is found in North America from Alberta and British Columbia down through Massachusetts to California. The species is listed as threatened in the US state of Connecticut.

== Host plants ==
In the western U.S., larvae have been found on Amelanchier and Ribes.
