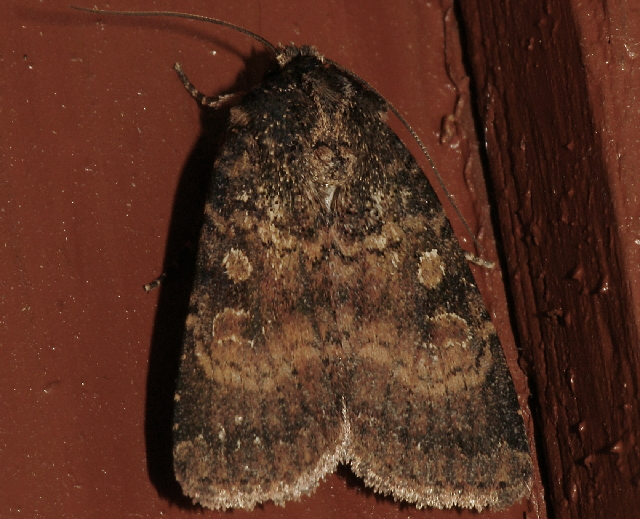

Scientific classification
- Kingdom: Animalia
- Phylum: Arthropoda
- Clade: Pancrustacea
- Class: Insecta
- Order: Lepidoptera
- Superfamily: Noctuoidea
- Family: Noctuidae
- Genus: Abagrotis
- Species: A. apposita

Binomial name
- Abagrotis apposita (Grote, 1878)

= Abagrotis apposita =

Species of moth

Abagrotis apposita is a species of cutworm or dart moth in the family Noctuidae. It is found in North America.

The MONA or Hodges number for Abagrotis apposita is 11037.
