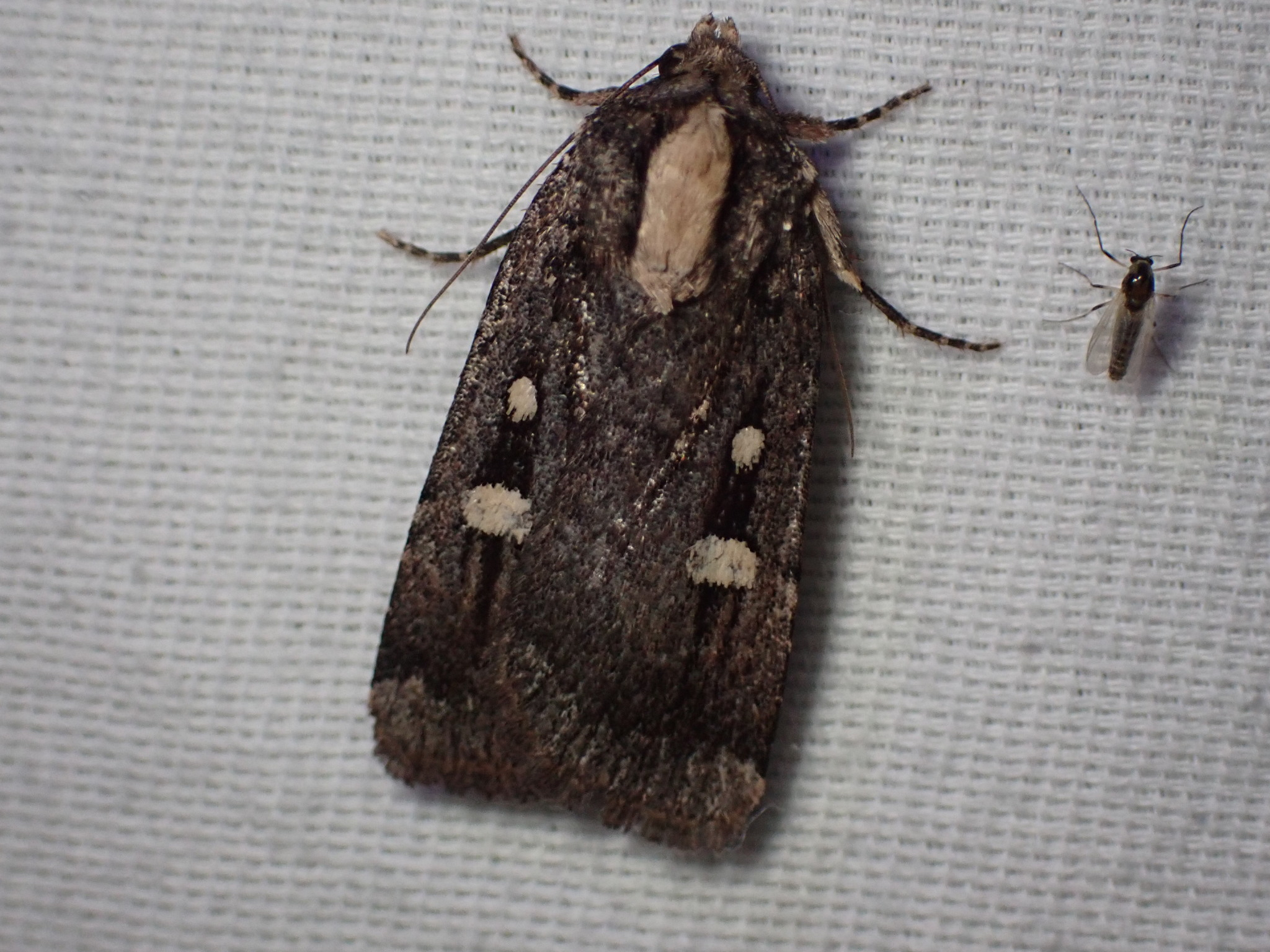

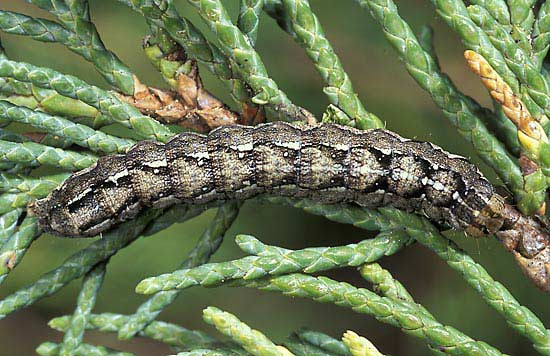
- Adult (top) and larva (bottom)

Scientific classification
- Domain: Eukaryota
- Kingdom: Animalia
- Phylum: Arthropoda
- Class: Insecta
- Order: Lepidoptera
- Superfamily: Noctuoidea
- Family: Noctuidae
- Genus: Abagrotis
- Species: A. glenni

Binomial name
- Abagrotis glenni Buckett, 1968

= Abagrotis glenni =

Species of moth

Abagrotis glenni is a species of moth in the family Noctuidae. It is found in western North America from British Columbia to California and Utah.

The wingspan is about 33 mm. Adults are on wing from April to May.

The larvae feed on Juniperus scopulorum and Thuja plicata.
