= Tesagrotis =

Scientific classification
- Domain: Eukaryota
- Kingdom: Animalia
- Phylum: Arthropoda
- Class: Insecta
- Order: Lepidoptera
- Superfamily: Noctuoidea
- Family: Noctuidae
- Subtribe: Noctuina
- Genus: Tesagrotis; Lafontaine, 1998

Genus of moths

Tesagrotis is a genus of moths of the family Noctuidae.

== Species ==
- Tesagrotis atrifrons (Grote, 1873)
- Tesagrotis piscipellis (Grote, 1878)
- Tesagrotis corrodera (Smith, 1907)
- Tesagrotis amia (Dyar, 1903) (syn: Tesagrotis fortiter (Barnes & McDunnough, 1918)
