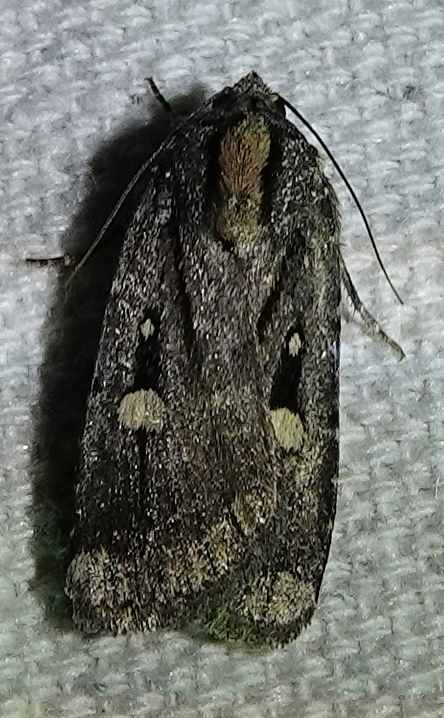

Scientific classification
- Kingdom: Animalia
- Phylum: Arthropoda
- Class: Insecta
- Order: Lepidoptera
- Superfamily: Noctuoidea
- Family: Noctuidae
- Genus: Abagrotis
- Species: A. mirabilis

Binomial name
- Abagrotis mirabilis Grote, 1879

= Abagrotis mirabilis =

Species of moth

Abagrotis mirabilis is a moth of the family Noctuidae first described by Augustus Radcliffe Grote in 1879. It is found in western North America, from British Columbia south to California.

The wingspan is about 35 mm.

The larvae feed on Juniperus and Cedrus species.
