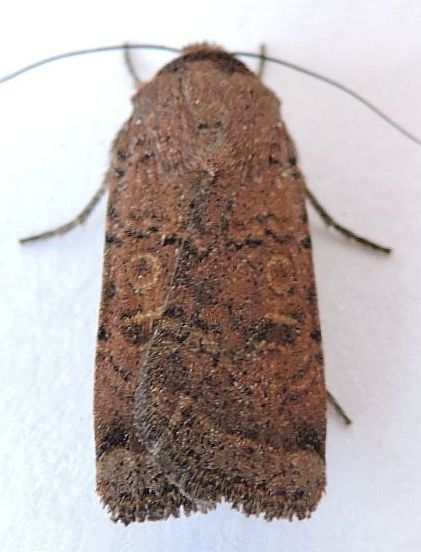
- Abagrotis reedi, Arizona

Scientific classification
- Domain: Eukaryota
- Kingdom: Animalia
- Phylum: Arthropoda
- Class: Insecta
- Order: Lepidoptera
- Superfamily: Noctuoidea
- Family: Noctuidae
- Genus: Abagrotis
- Species: A. reedi

Binomial name
- Abagrotis reedi Buckett, 1969

= Abagrotis reedi =

Species of moth

Abagrotis reedi is a moth of the family Noctuidae first described by John S. Buckett in 1969. It is found in North America, from California, east to Arizona, Colorado and Iowa into Canada where it is found in Manitoba, Saskatchewan, Alberta and British Columbia.

The wingspan is 33–36 mm.
