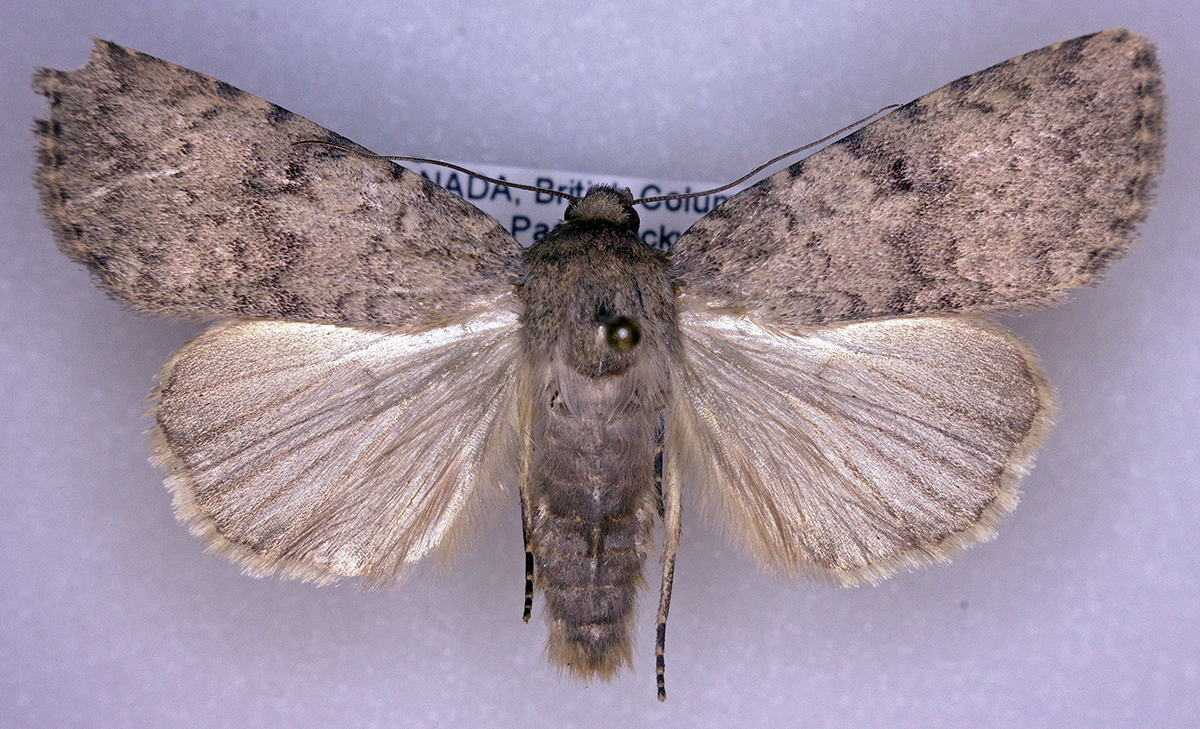
- Pronoctua typica

Scientific classification
- Domain: Eukaryota
- Kingdom: Animalia
- Phylum: Arthropoda
- Class: Insecta
- Order: Lepidoptera
- Superfamily: Noctuoidea
- Family: Noctuidae
- Subtribe: Noctuina
- Genus: Pronoctua; Smith, 1894

= Pronoctua =

Genus of moths

Pronoctua is a genus of moths of the family Noctuidae.

== Species ==
- Pronoctua craboi Lafontaine, 1998
- Pronoctua peabodyae (Dyar, 1903)
- Pronoctua pyrophiloides (Harvey, 1876)
- Pronoctua typica Smith, 1894
