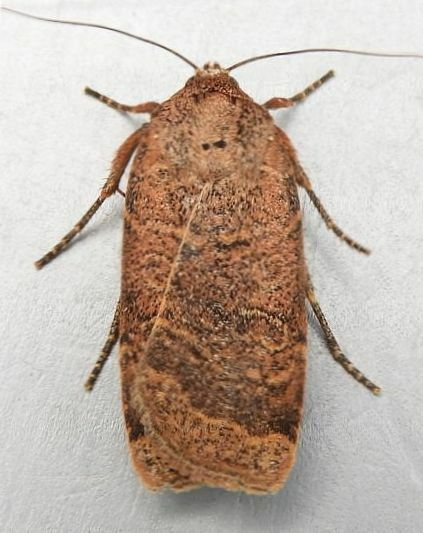
- In Pennsylvania

Conservation status
- Apparently Secure (NatureServe)

Scientific classification
- Kingdom: Animalia
- Phylum: Arthropoda
- Clade: Pancrustacea
- Class: Insecta
- Order: Lepidoptera
- Superfamily: Noctuoidea
- Family: Noctuidae
- Genus: Abagrotis
- Species: A. anchocelioides

Binomial name
- Abagrotis anchocelioides (Guenée, 1852)

Synonyms
- Rhynchagrotis anchocelioides Guenée, 1852

= Abagrotis anchocelioides =

Blueberry budworm moth

Species of moth

Abagrotis anchocelioides, commonly known as the blueberry budworm moth, is a species of moth in the family Noctuidae. It is found in North America from southern Quebec to North Carolina, west to southern Manitoba, North Dakota and Missouri.

The wingspan is 32–38 mm. Adults are on wing from June to September.

The larvae are thought to feed on fruit buds of blueberry, although other sources list the food plants as unknown.
