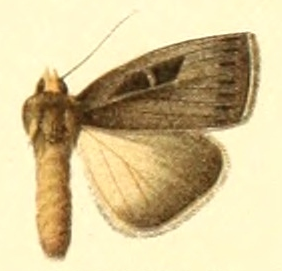

Scientific classification
- Domain: Eukaryota
- Kingdom: Animalia
- Phylum: Arthropoda
- Class: Insecta
- Order: Lepidoptera
- Superfamily: Noctuoidea
- Family: Noctuidae
- Subtribe: Noctuina
- Genus: Pseudohermonassa; Varga, 1990

= Pseudohermonassa =

Genus of moths

Pseudohermonassa is a genus of moths of the family Noctuidae. Some species were formerly placed in Xestia.

== Species ==
- Pseudohermonassa bicarnea (Guenée, 1852)
- Pseudohermonassa flavotincta (J.B. Smith, 1892)
- Pseudohermonassa melancholica (Lederer, 1853)
- Pseudohermonassa ononensis (Bremer, 1861)
- Pseudohermonassa tenuicula (Morrison, 1874)
- Pseudohermonassa velata (Staudinger, 1888)
