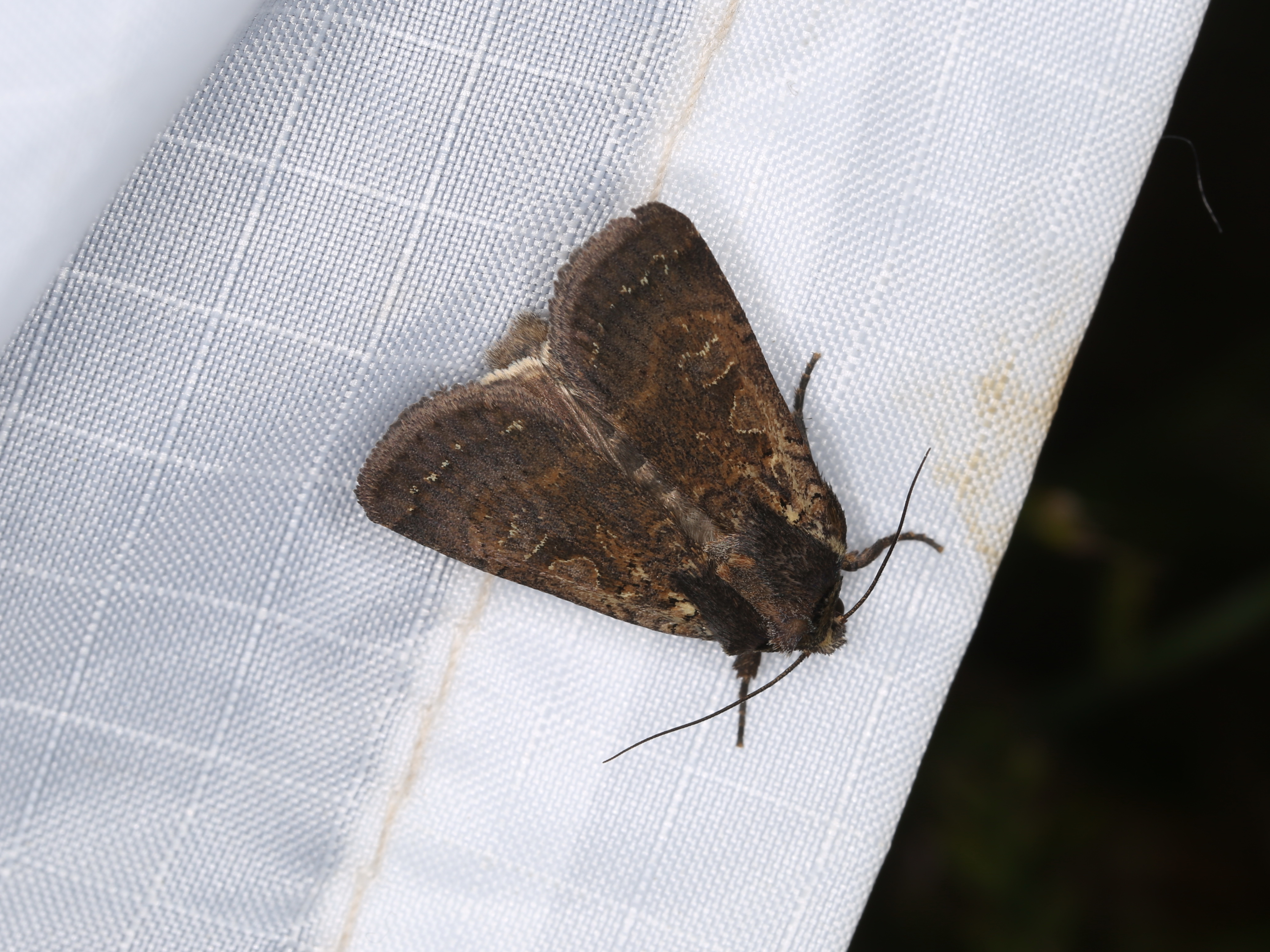
- Parabagrotis insularis in Ring Mountain Reserve, San Francisco, CA, USA (2018)

Scientific classification
- Kingdom: Animalia
- Phylum: Arthropoda
- Clade: Pancrustacea
- Class: Insecta
- Order: Lepidoptera
- Superfamily: Noctuoidea
- Family: Noctuidae
- Genus: Parabagrotis
- Species: P. insularis

Binomial name
- Parabagrotis insularis (Grote, 1876)

Synonyms
- Agrotis insularis Grote, 1876; Agrotis emarginata Grote, 1876; Agrotis facula Grote, 1876; Agrotis inelegans Smith, 1890; Rhynchagrotis meta Smith, 1903; Rhynchagrotis niger Smith, 1903; Triphaena formalis ab. faculana Strand, 1916

= Parabagrotis insularis =

Species of moth

Parabagrotis insularis is a species of moth in the family Noctuidae (owlet moths). It is found in North America, where it has been recorded from southern Vancouver Island, along the Pacific Coast through California to near the border with Mexico. The species was described by Augustus Radcliffe Grote in 1876.

The length of the forewings is 13–16 mm. Adults are on wing from April to October.

The MONA or Hodges number for Parabagrotis insularis is 11047.2.
