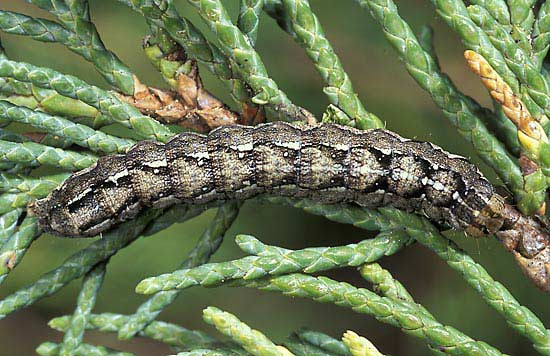
- A. glenni

Scientific classification
- Domain: Eukaryota
- Kingdom: Animalia
- Phylum: Arthropoda
- Class: Insecta
- Order: Lepidoptera
- Superfamily: Noctuoidea
- Family: Noctuidae
- Subtribe: Noctuina
- Genus: Abagrotis; Smith, 1890

Type species
- Agrotis erratica (now Abagrotis erratica)

Synonyms
- Rynchagrotis

= Abagrotis =

Genus of moths

Abagrotis is a genus of moths of the family Noctuidae.

== Species ==
- Abagrotis alampeta Franclemont, 1967
- Abagrotis alcandola (Smith, 1908)
- Abagrotis alternata (Grote, 1865) – greater red dart moth
- Abagrotis anchocelioides (Guenée, 1852) – blueberry budworm moth
- Abagrotis apposita (Grote, 1878)
- Abagrotis barnesi Benjamin, 1921 (syn. for Abagrotis orbis)
- Abagrotis baueri McDunnough, 1949
- Abagrotis belfragei (Smith, 1890)
- Abagrotis bimarginalis (Grote, 1883)
- Abagrotis brunneipennis Grote, 1875
- Abagrotis cryptica Lafontaine, 1998
- Abagrotis cupida Grote, 1865 – Cupid dart moth
- Abagrotis denticulata McDunnough, 1946
- Abagrotis dickeli Lafontaine, 1998
- Abagrotis discoidalis (Grote, 1876)
- Abagrotis dodi McDunnough, 1927
- Abagrotis duanca (Smith, 1908)
- Abagrotis erratica (Smith, 1890)
- Abagrotis forbesi (Benjamin, 1921)
- Abagrotis glenni Buckett, 1968
- Abagrotis hennei Buckett, 1968
- Abagrotis hermina Lafontaine, 1998
- Abagrotis kirkwoodi Buckett, 1968
- Abagrotis magnicupida Lafontaine, 1998
- Abagrotis mexicana Lafontaine, 1998
- Abagrotis mirabilis (Grote, 1879)
- Abagrotis nanalis (Grote, 1881)
- Abagrotis nefascia (Smith, 1908) (syn: Abagrotis crumbi Franclemont, 1955)
- Abagrotis orbis Grote, 1876
- Abagrotis petalama Lafontaine, 1998
- Abagrotis placida (Grote, 1876)
- Abagrotis pulchrata (Blackmore, 1925)
- Abagrotis reedi Buckett, 1969
- Abagrotis rubricundis Buckett, 1968
- Abagrotis scopeops (Dyar, 1904) (syn: Abagrotis tecatensis Buckett, 1968)
- Abagrotis striata Buckett, 1968
- Abagrotis trigona (Smith, 1893)
- Abagrotis turbulenta McDunnough, 1927
- Abagrotis variata (Grote, 1876)
- Abagrotis vittifrons (Grote, 1864)
