= Tesagrotis atrifrons =

Scientific classification
- Domain: Eukaryota
- Kingdom: Animalia
- Phylum: Arthropoda
- Class: Insecta
- Order: Lepidoptera
- Superfamily: Noctuoidea
- Family: Noctuidae
- Genus: Tesagrotis
- Species: T. atrifrons

Binomial name
- Tesagrotis atrifrons (Grote, 1873)

Species of moth

Tesagrotis atrifrons is a species of cutworm or dart moth in the family Noctuidae. It is found in North America.

The MONA or Hodges number for Tesagrotis atrifrons is 10977.
