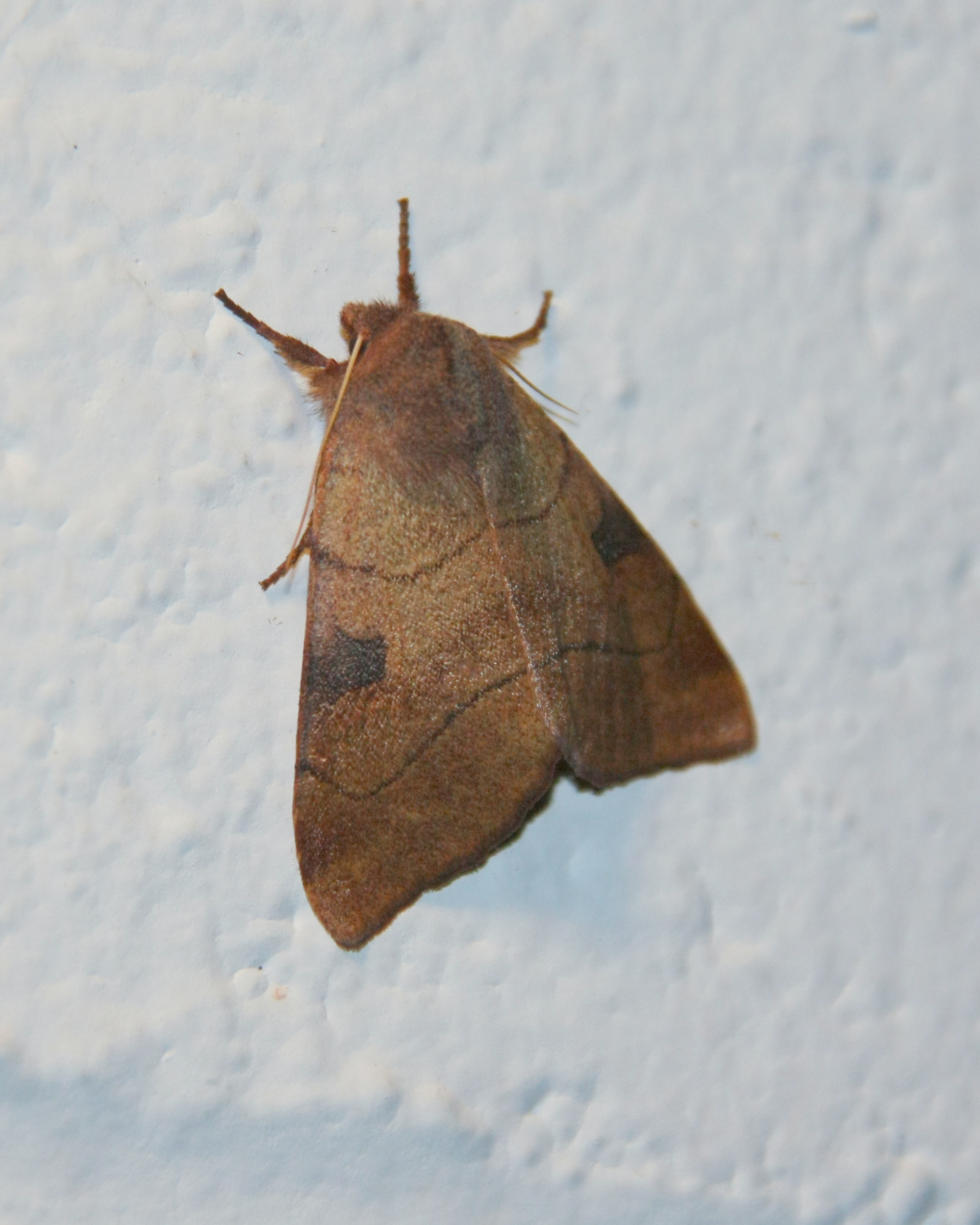

Scientific classification
- Kingdom: Animalia
- Phylum: Arthropoda
- Class: Insecta
- Order: Lepidoptera
- Superfamily: Noctuoidea
- Family: Noctuidae
- Genus: Choephora
- Species: C. fungorum

Binomial name
- Choephora fungorum Grote & Robinson, 1868

= Choephora fungorum =

Species of moth

Choephora fungorum, the bent-line dart, is a moth of the family Noctuidae. It is found in eastern North America, from southern Ontario, Pennsylvania, and southern Michigan, south to the Gulf coast of northern Florida and west to central Kansas and eastern Texas.

The wingspan is 33–47 mm. The moth flies from September to November depending on the location.

The larvae feed on Trifolium, Nicotiana and various herbaceous weeds. Larvae have been reared on Taraxacum species.
