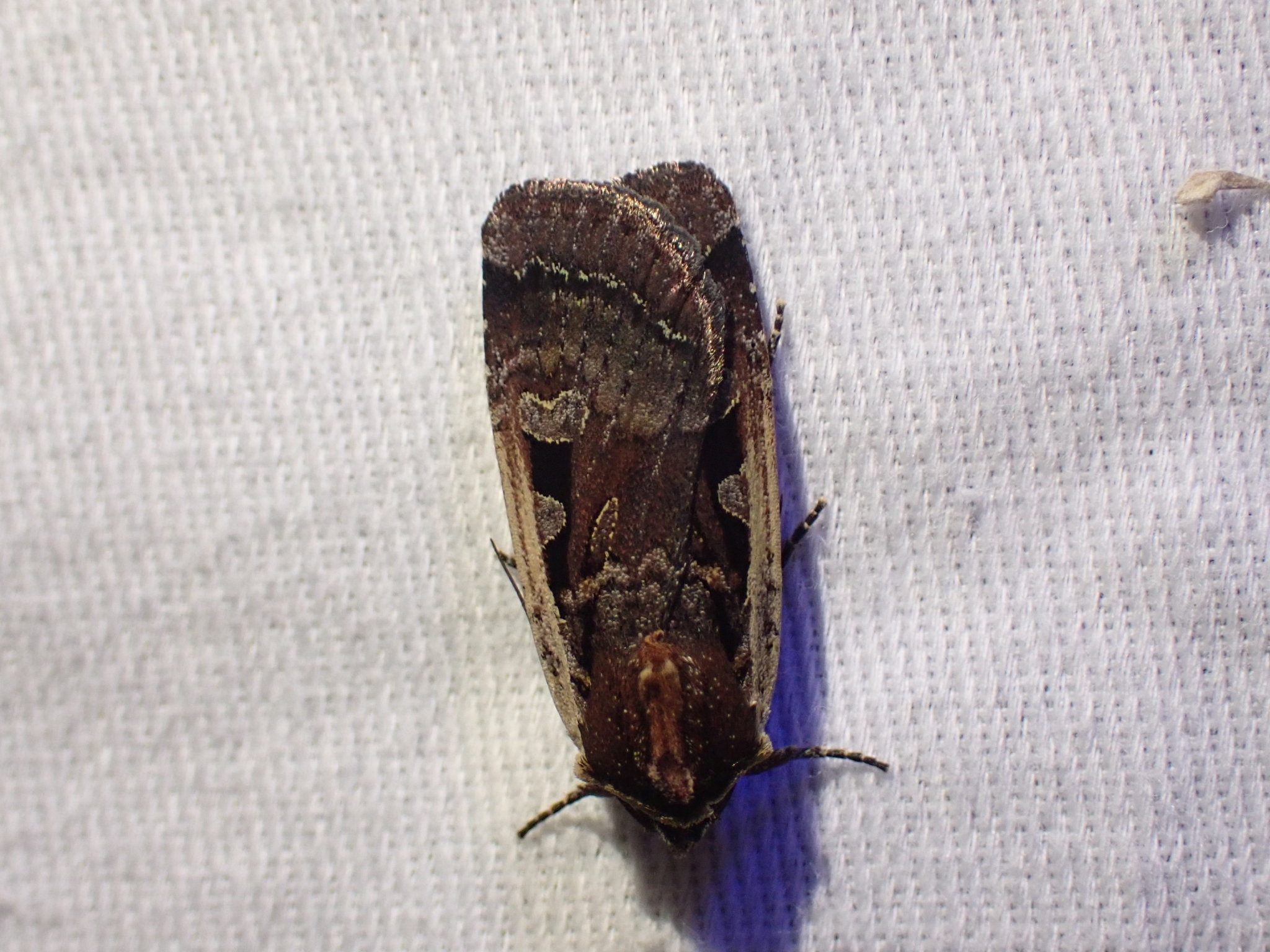
- Parabagrotis exsertistigma

Scientific classification
- Domain: Eukaryota
- Kingdom: Animalia
- Phylum: Arthropoda
- Class: Insecta
- Order: Lepidoptera
- Superfamily: Noctuoidea
- Family: Noctuidae
- Subtribe: Noctuina
- Genus: Parabagrotis; Lafontaine (1998

= Parabagrotis =

Genus of moths

Parabagrotis is a genus of moths in the family Noctuidae.

== Species ==
- Parabagrotis cupidissima (Grote, 1875)
- Parabagrotis exertistigma (Morrison, 1874)
- Parabagrotis formalis (Grote, 1874)
- Parabagrotis insularis (Grote, 1876)
- Parabagrotis sulinaris Lafontaine, 1998
