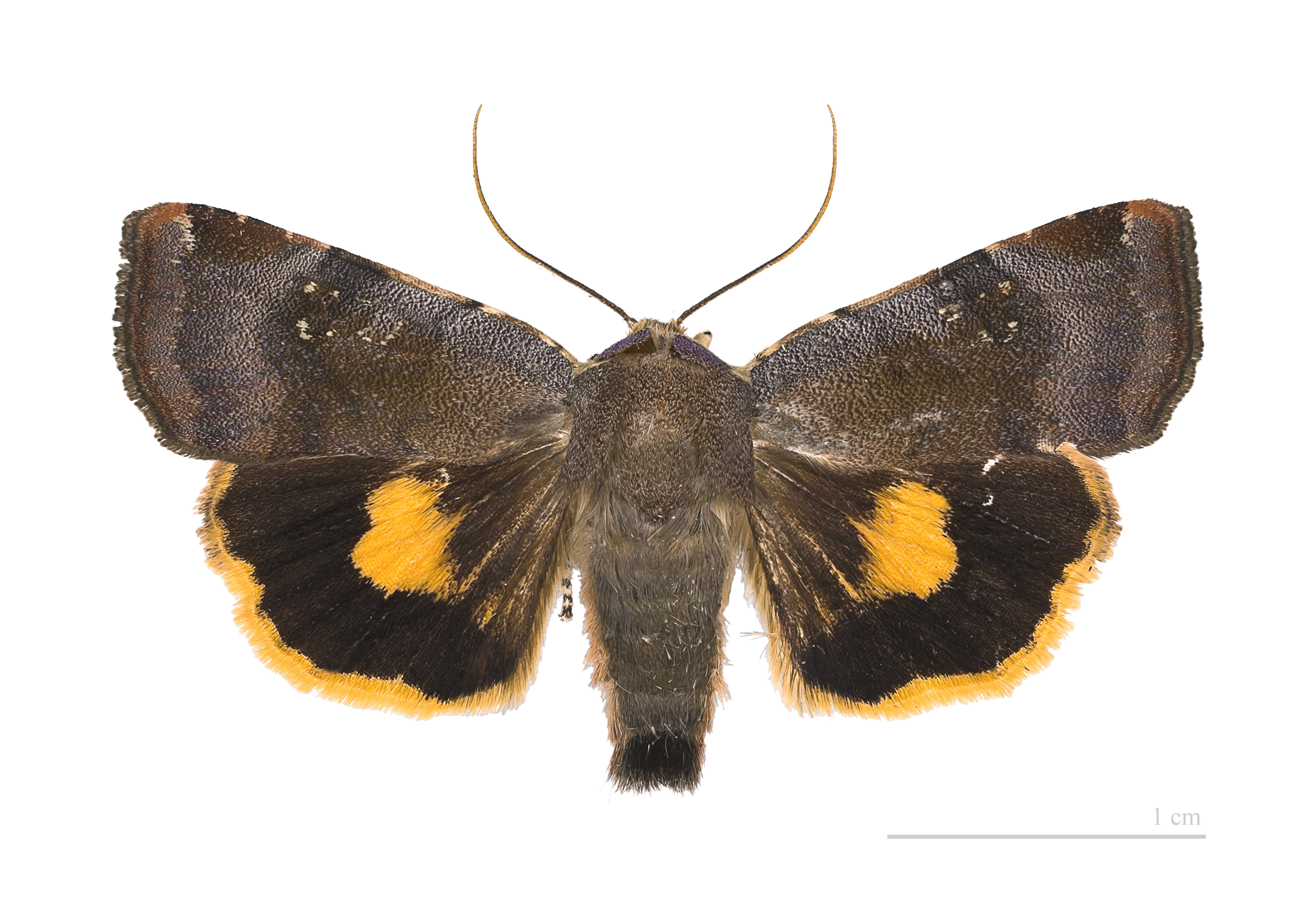
- Noctua jantina

Scientific classification
- Kingdom: Animalia
- Phylum: Arthropoda
- Clade: Pancrustacea
- Class: Insecta
- Order: Lepidoptera
- Superfamily: Noctuoidea
- Family: Noctuidae
- Tribe: Noctuini
- Subtribe: Noctuina

= Noctuina =

Subtribe of moths

Noctuina is a subtribe of cutworm or dart moths in the family Noctuidae. There are at least 170 described species in Noctuina.

== Genera ==
- Abagrotis Smith, 1890
- Adelphagrotis Smith, 1890
- Agnorisma Lafontaine, 1998
- Anaplectoides McDunnough, 1929
- Aplectoides Butler, 1878
- Cerastis Ochsenheimer, 1816
- Chersotis Boisduval, 1840
- Choephora Grote & Robinson, 1868
- Coenophila Stephens, 1850
- Cryptocala Benjamin, 1921
- Diarsia Hübner, 1821
- Eueretagrotis Smith, 1890
- Eurois Hübner, 1821
- Graphiphora Ochsenheimer, 1816
- Hemipachnobia McDunnough, 1929
- Isochlora Staudinger, 1882
- Lycophotia Hübner, 1821
- Noctua Linnaeus, 1758 (yellow underwings)
- Ochropleura Hübner, 1821
- Parabagrotis Lafontaine, 1998
- Parabarrovia Gibson, 1920
- Paradiarsia McDunnough, 1929
- Prognorisma Lafontaine, 1998
- Pronoctua Smith, 1894
- Protolampra McDunnough, 1929
- Pseudohermonassa Varga in Varga, Ronkay & Yela, 1990
- Rhyacia Hübner, 1821
- Setagrotis Smith, 1890
- Spaelotis Boisduval, 1840
- Tesagrotis Lafontaine, 1998
- Xestia Hübner, 1818
