= Harti (disambiguation) =

Harti is a sub-clan of the Somali Darod clan.

Harti may also refer to:

- Abgaal, themselves, a sub-clan of the Somali Hawiye clan have a sub-clan named Harti
- Harti (Gadag district), a town in the Gadag district, Karnataka, India
- Härti, a quarter in district 6, Winterthur in the canton of Zurich, Switzerland
- Harti Weirather, an Austrian former alpine skier
- Stade El Harti, a multi-use stadium in Marrakech, Morocco
- Rhagada harti, a species of gastropod in the family Camaenidae
- Cambarus harti, a species of crayfish in the family Cambaridae
- Macrochilo orciferalis, a moth of the family Noctuidae, sometimes known as Macrochilo harti
- Antheraea pernyi, a moth in the family Saturniidae, sometimes known as Antheraea hartii
