= Oberfeld =

Oberfeld may refer to:

- Oberfeld (Winterthur), a quarter in Winterthur, Switzerland

== People with the surname ==
- Casimir Oberfeld (1903–1945), Polish-born French composer
- Harvey Oberfeld (born 1945), Canadian journalist
