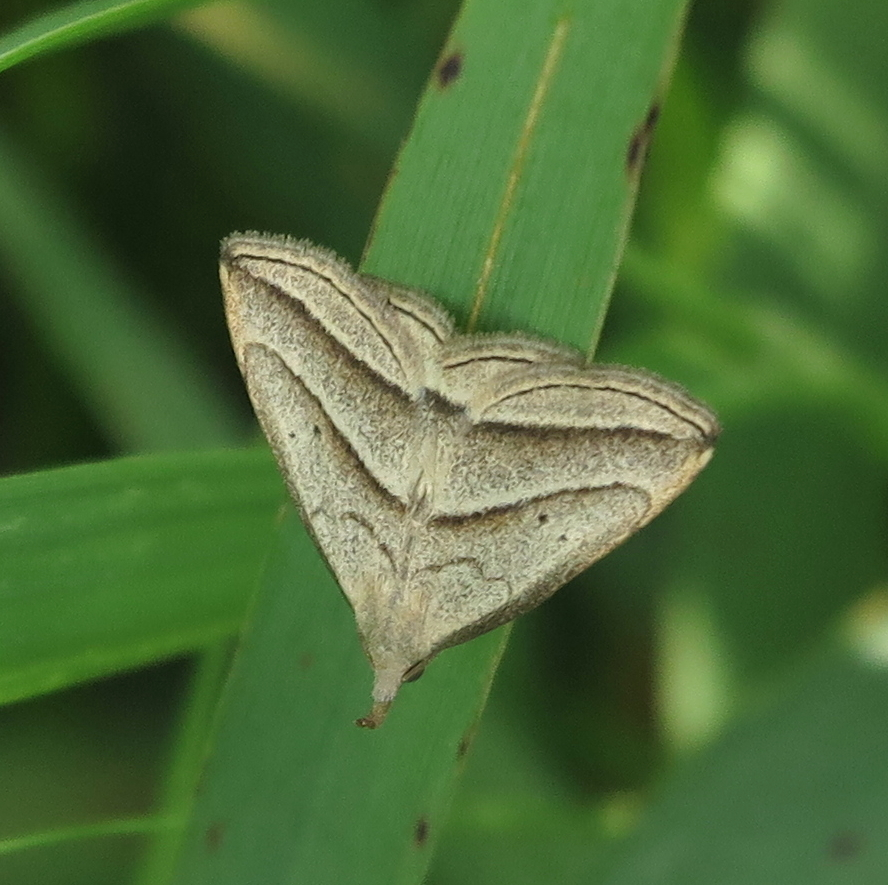

Scientific classification
- Kingdom: Animalia
- Phylum: Arthropoda
- Class: Insecta
- Order: Lepidoptera
- Superfamily: Noctuoidea
- Family: Erebidae
- Genus: Macrochilo
- Species: M. absorptalis

Binomial name
- Macrochilo absorptalis (Walker, 1859)

Synonyms
- Hormisa absorptalis Walker, 1859; Litognatha nubilifascia Grote, 1873

= Macrochilo absorptalis =

Species of moth

Macrochilo absorptalis, the slant-lined owlet moth or slant-lined fan-foot, is a species of litter moth of the family Erebidae. It is found from Manitoba to Nova Scotia, south to Georgia and Texas.

The wingspan is about 22 mm. Adults are on wing from May to September. There is one generation per year in the north. There are two or more generations southward.
