= Hardau (Winterthur) =

Coordinates: 47°30′50″N 8°40′49″E

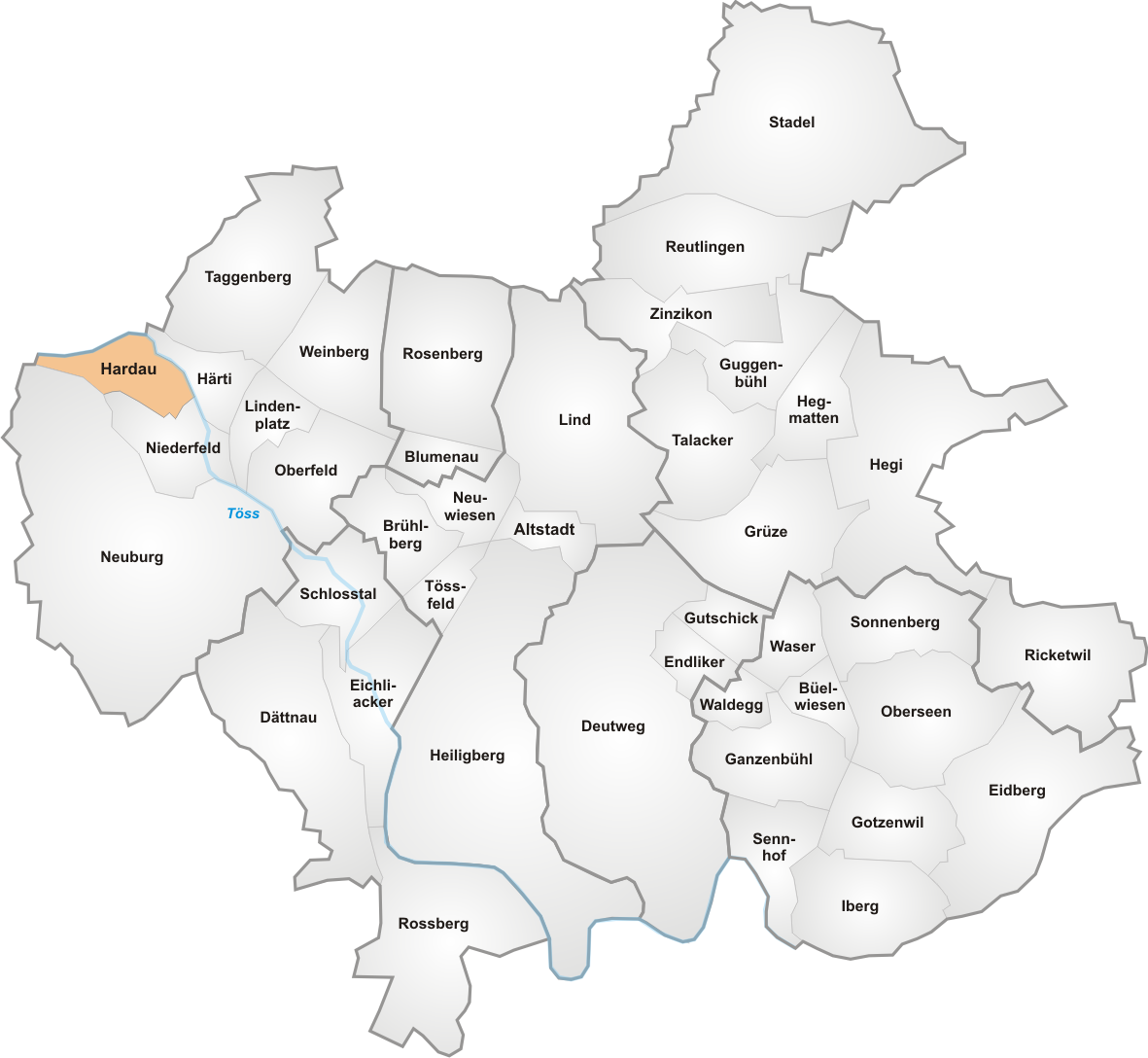
The quarter of Hardau in Winterthur.

Hardau is a quarter in the district 6 (Wülflingen) of Winterthur.

It was formerly a part of Wülflingen municipality, which was incorporated into Winterthur in 1922.
