= Lindenplatz =

Quarter in Winterthur, Switzerland

Coordinates: 47°30′40″N 8°41′38″E

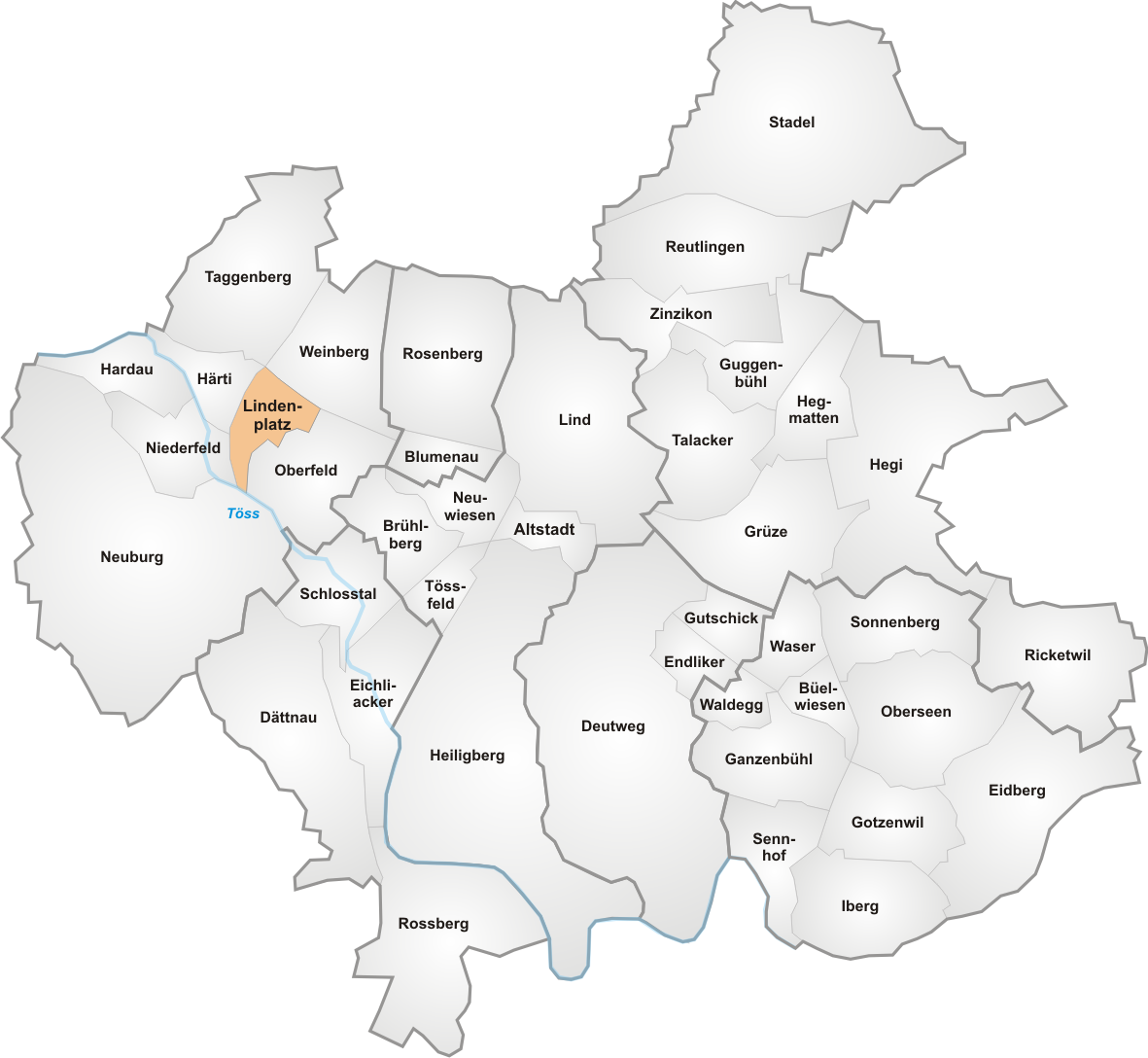
The quarter of Lindenplatz in Winterthur.

Lindenplatz is a quarter in the district 6 (Wülflingen) of Winterthur.

It was formerly a part of Wülflingen municipality, which was incorporated into Winterthur in 1922.
