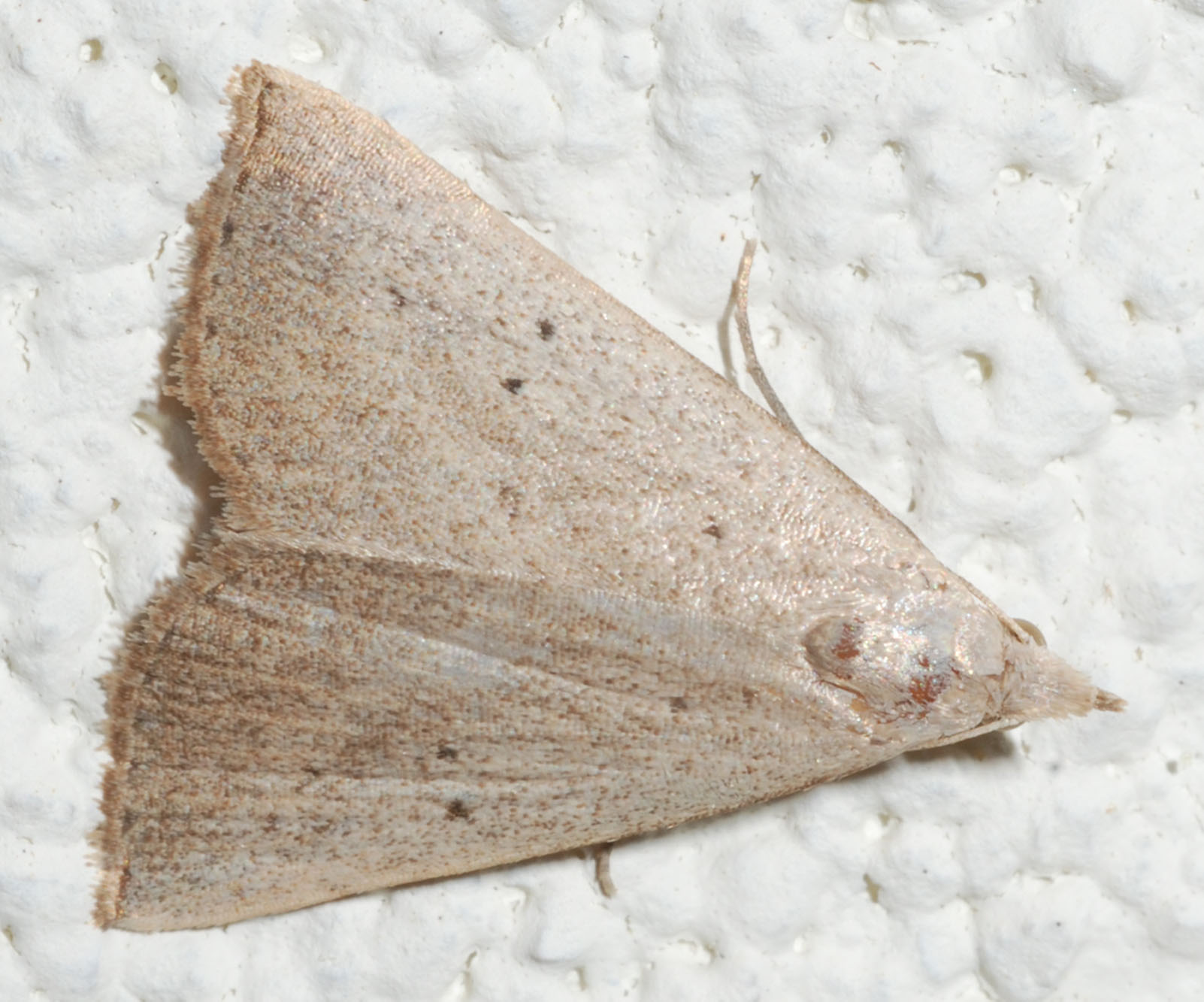

Scientific classification
- Kingdom: Animalia
- Phylum: Arthropoda
- Clade: Pancrustacea
- Class: Insecta
- Order: Lepidoptera
- Superfamily: Noctuoidea
- Family: Erebidae
- Genus: Macrochilo
- Species: M. louisiana

Binomial name
- Macrochilo louisiana (Forbes, 1922)

Synonyms
- Hormisa louisiana (Forbes, 1922); Xylormisa louisiana Forbes, 1922

= Macrochilo louisiana =

Species of moth

Macrochilo louisiana, the Louisiana macrochilo or Louisiana snout-moth, is a litter moth of the family Erebidae. The species was first described by William Trowbridge Merrifield Forbes in 1922. It is found in North America from Quebec and Maine to Florida, west to Texas, north to Alberta.

The wingspan is 20–27 mm. Adults are on wing from June to September in the north and from February in the south.
