= Macrochilo bivittata =

Scientific classification
- Kingdom: Animalia
- Phylum: Arthropoda
- Class: Insecta
- Order: Lepidoptera
- Superfamily: Noctuoidea
- Family: Erebidae
- Genus: Macrochilo
- Species: M. bivittata

Binomial name
- Macrochilo bivittata Grote, 1877

Synonyms
- Hormisa bivittata (Grote, 1877)

Species of moth

Macrochilo bivittata, the two-striped snout-moth, is a litter moth of the family Erebidae. The species was first described by Augustus Radcliffe Grote in 1877. It is found from the Atlantic coast west across the parklands and southern boreal forest of North America to central Alberta, south to Massachusetts and Ohio.

The wingspan is 27–28 mm. Adults are on wing in July in Alberta.
