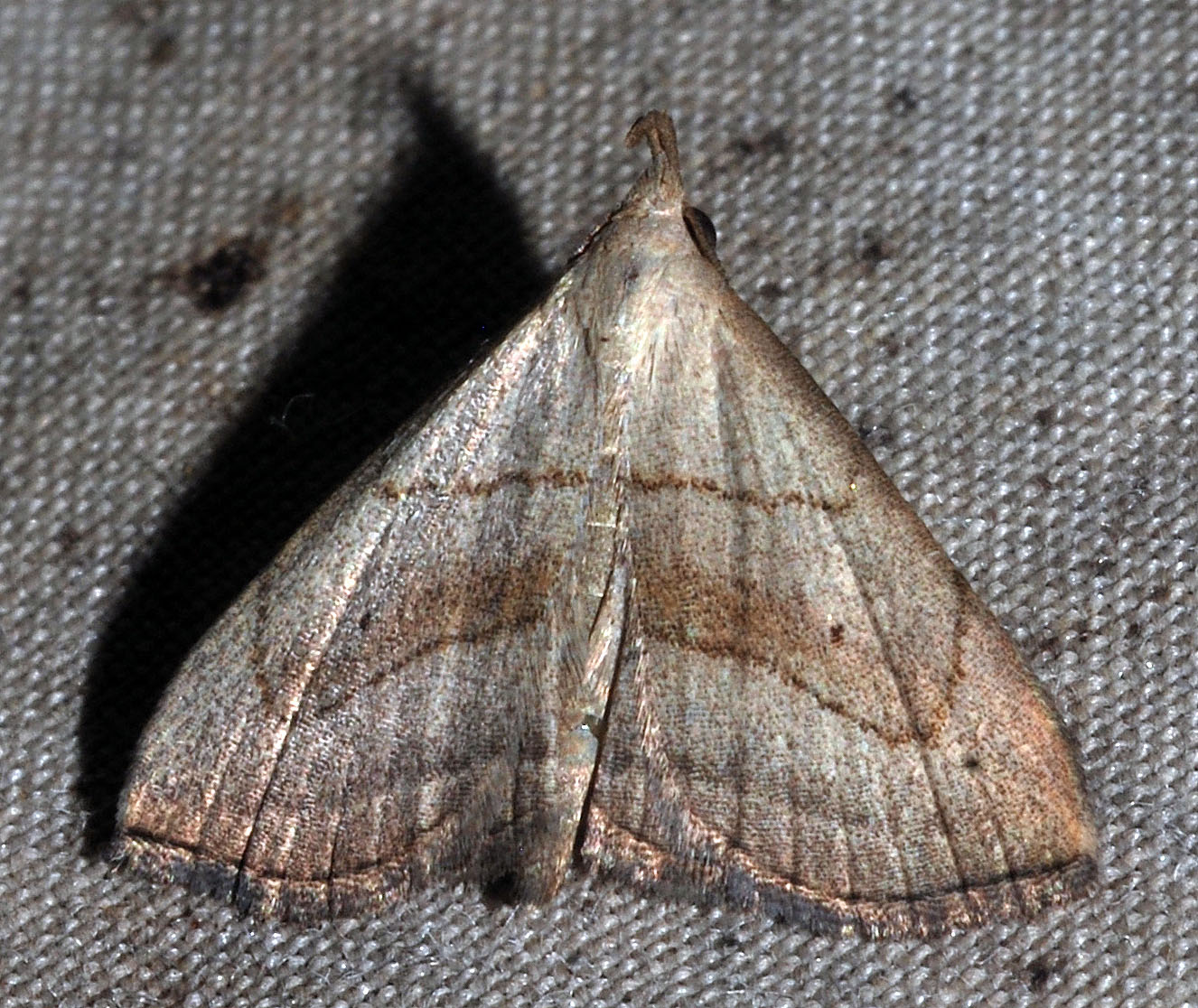

Scientific classification
- Kingdom: Animalia
- Phylum: Arthropoda
- Class: Insecta
- Order: Lepidoptera
- Superfamily: Noctuoidea
- Family: Erebidae
- Genus: Macrochilo
- Species: M. litophora

Binomial name
- Macrochilo litophora Grote, 1873

Synonyms
- Hormisa litophora (Grote, 1873)

= Macrochilo litophora =

Species of moth

Macrochilo litophora, the angulate fan-foot or brown-lined owlet moth, is a litter moth of the family Erebidae. The species was first described by Augustus Radcliffe Grote in 1873. It is found in the United States from Wisconsin, east to Massachusetts, south to North Carolina, South Carolina, Mississippi and Texas.

The wingspan is about 20 mm. There is one generation per year in the north. There are two generations in southern Ohio and Missouri.

The larvae feed on dead grasses, clover and probably other organic matter.
