= Neuburg (Winterthur) =

Coordinates: 47°29′48″N 8°40′35″E

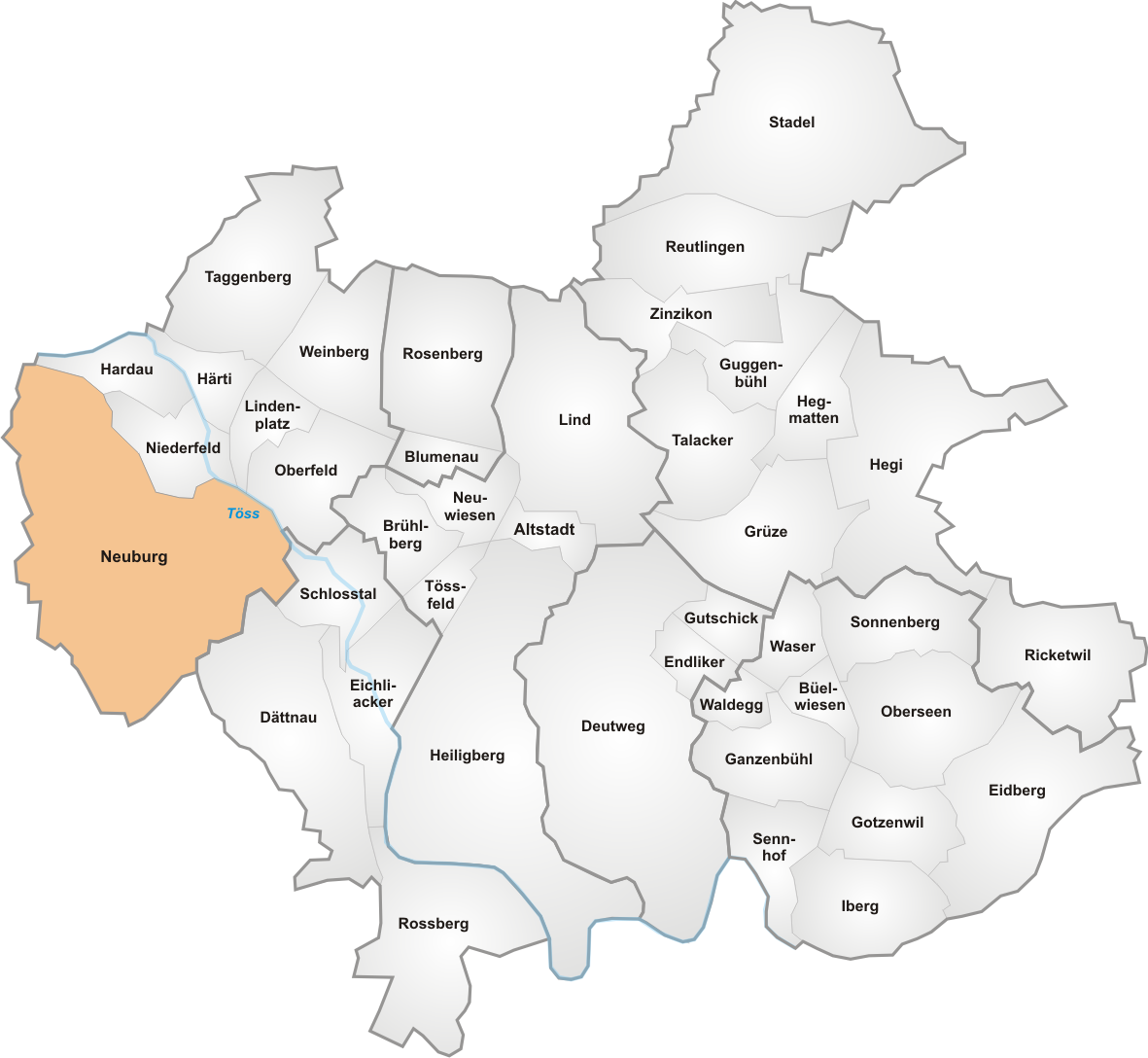
The quarter of Neuburg in Winterthur.

Neuburg (Swiss Standard German pronunciation: [ˈnɔʏbʊrɡ]) is a quarter in the district 6 (Wülflingen) of Winterthur, Switzerland.

It was formerly a part of Wülflingen municipality, which was incorporated into Winterthur in 1922.

The name of the quarter comes from a former castle called "Neuburg" (engl. "newcastle") on a hill above the little village. Since the 16th century the name "Neuburg" isn't in use anymore for the place where the castle was, it is called nowadays "Hoh-Wülflingen". From the former castle you only see the moats and a little part of the wall left.
