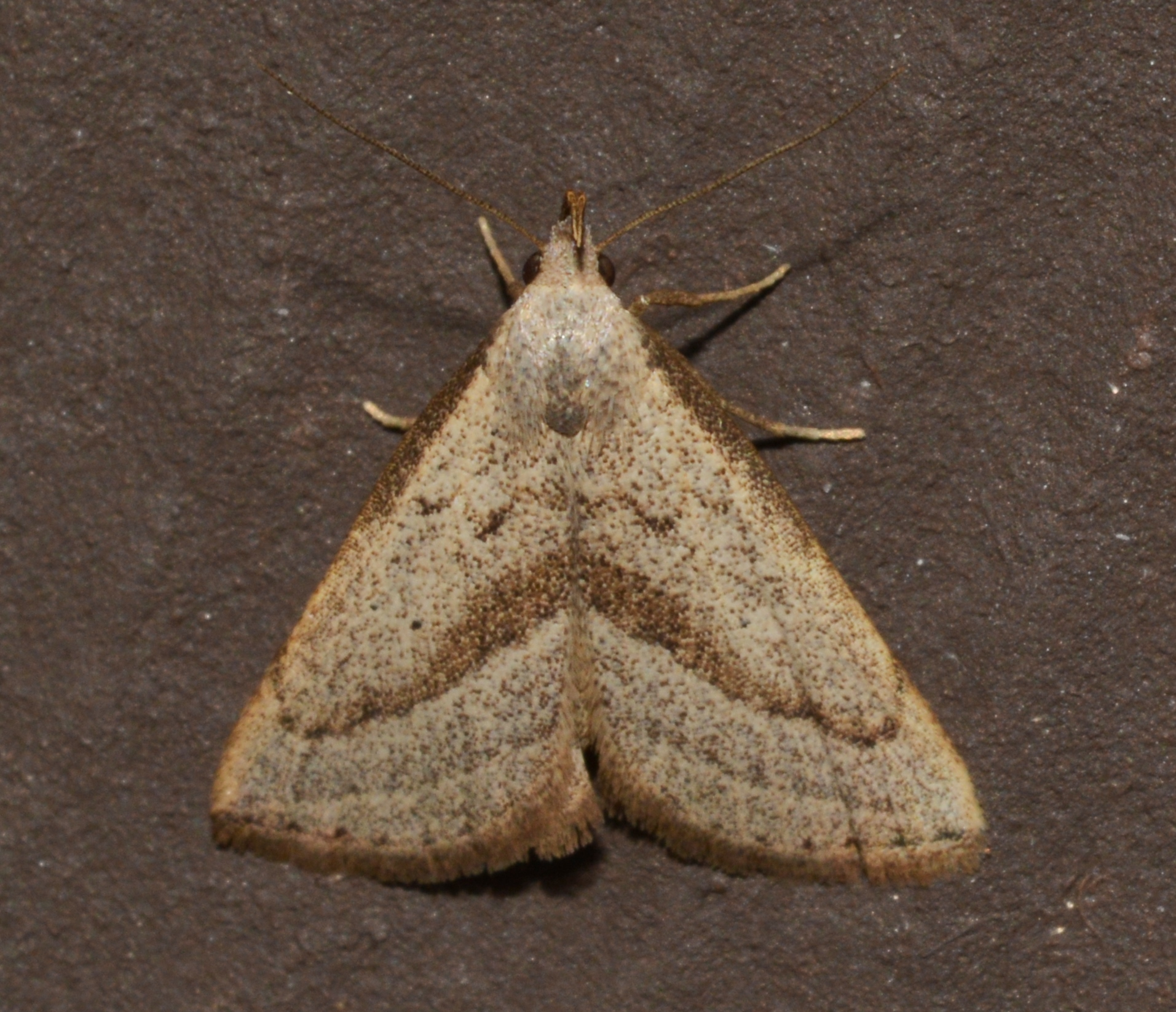

Scientific classification
- Kingdom: Animalia
- Phylum: Arthropoda
- Clade: Pancrustacea
- Class: Insecta
- Order: Lepidoptera
- Superfamily: Noctuoidea
- Family: Erebidae
- Subfamily: Herminiinae
- Genus: Macrochilo
- Species: M. hypocritalis

Binomial name
- Macrochilo hypocritalis Ferguson, 1982

= Macrochilo hypocritalis =

Species of moth

Macrochilo hypocritalis, the twin-dotted macrochilo, is a species of moth in the family Erebidae. The species was first described by Douglas C. Ferguson in 1982. It is found in North America, where it has been recorded from the eastern United States. The habitat consists of open, herb-dominated wetlands.

The wingspan is about 18 mm.

The MONA or Hodges number for Macrochilo hypocritalis is 8357.1.
