= Wülflingen =

Coordinates: 47.510°N 8.683°E

Wülflingen District of the city of Winterthur
- District
- Flag Seal

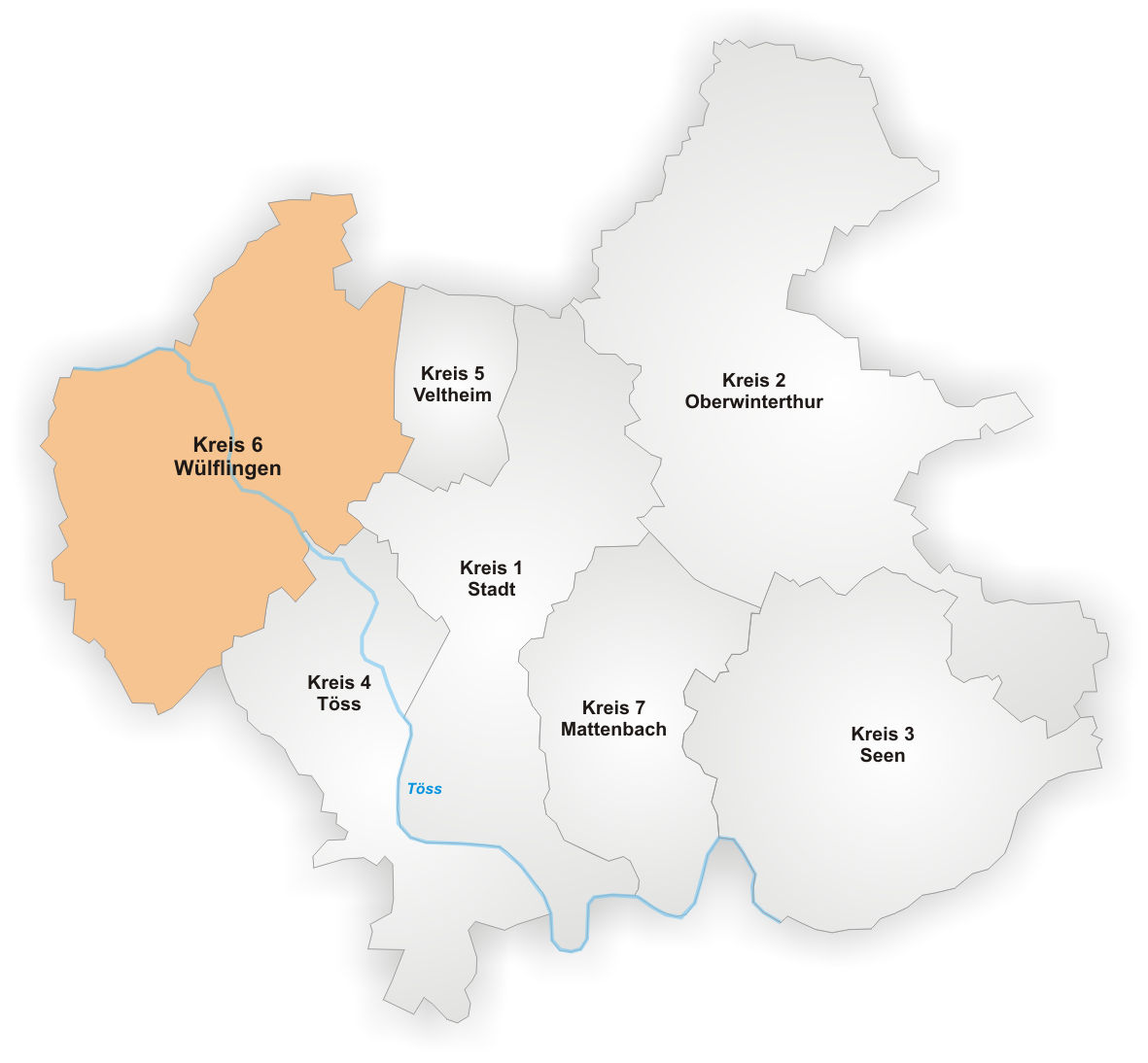
- Country: Switzerland
- Canton: Zürich
- City: Winterthur

Area
  - Total: 13.24 km^{2} (5.11 sq mi)

Population (31. Dec. 2012)
  - Total: 15,096
- District number: 6
- Quarters: Weinberg; Oberfeld; Lindenplatz; Niederfeld; Neuburg; Hardau; Härti; Taggenberg

Wülflingen (German pronunciation: [ˈvʏlflɪŋən]) is a district in the Swiss city of Winterthur, situated in the lower Töss Valley. It is district number six, and comprises the quarters Weinberg, Oberfeld, Lindenplatz, Niederfeld, Neuburg, Hardau, Härti and Taggenberg.

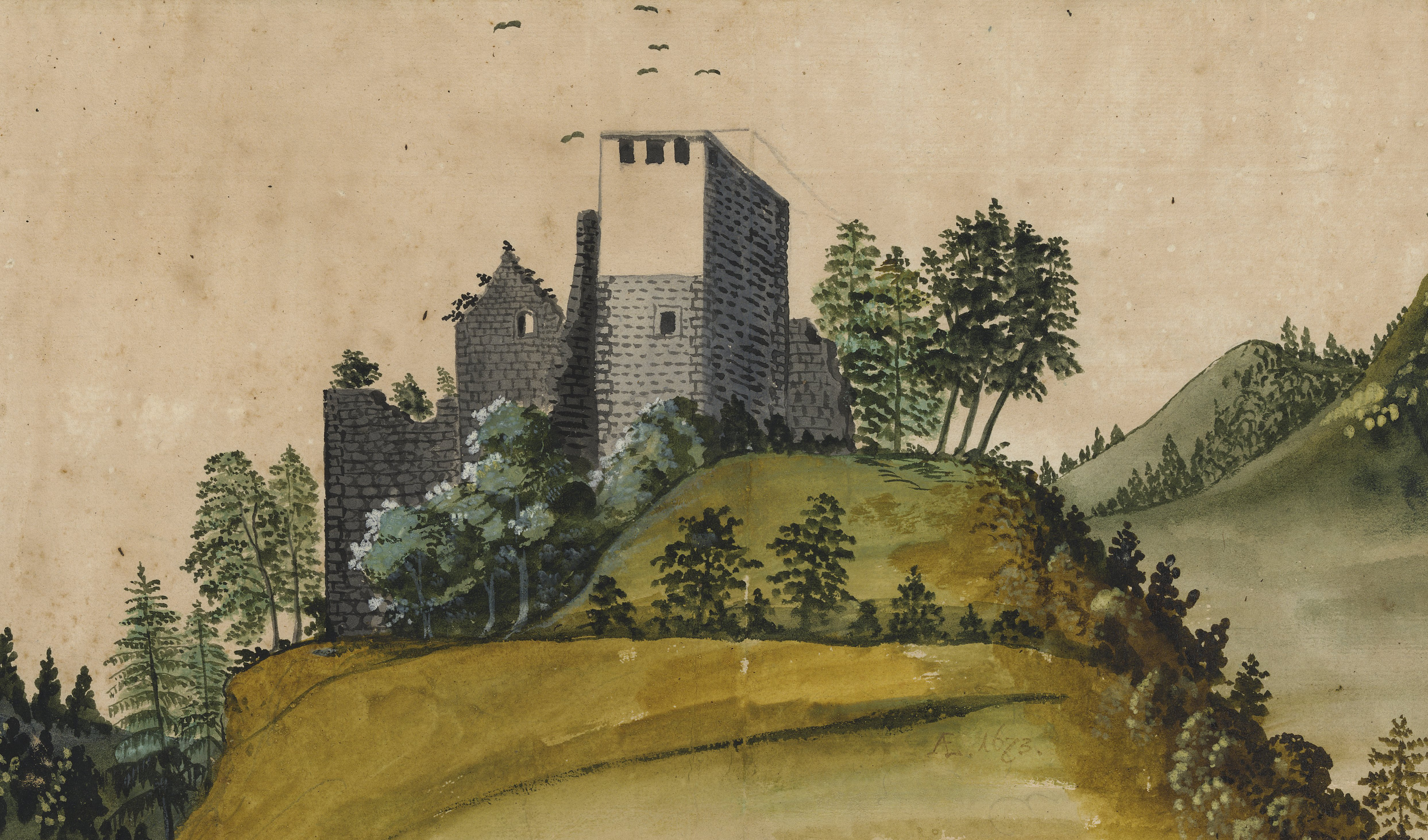
Upper Wülflingen in 1673.

Wülflingen was formerly a municipality of its own, but was incorporated into Winterthur in 1922.

Aerial view from 400 m by Walter Mittelholzer (1923)

== Transport ==
Winterthur Wülflingen railway station is a stop of the Zürich S-Bahn on line S41.
