= Taggenberg =

Coordinates: 47.51996°N 8.68391°E

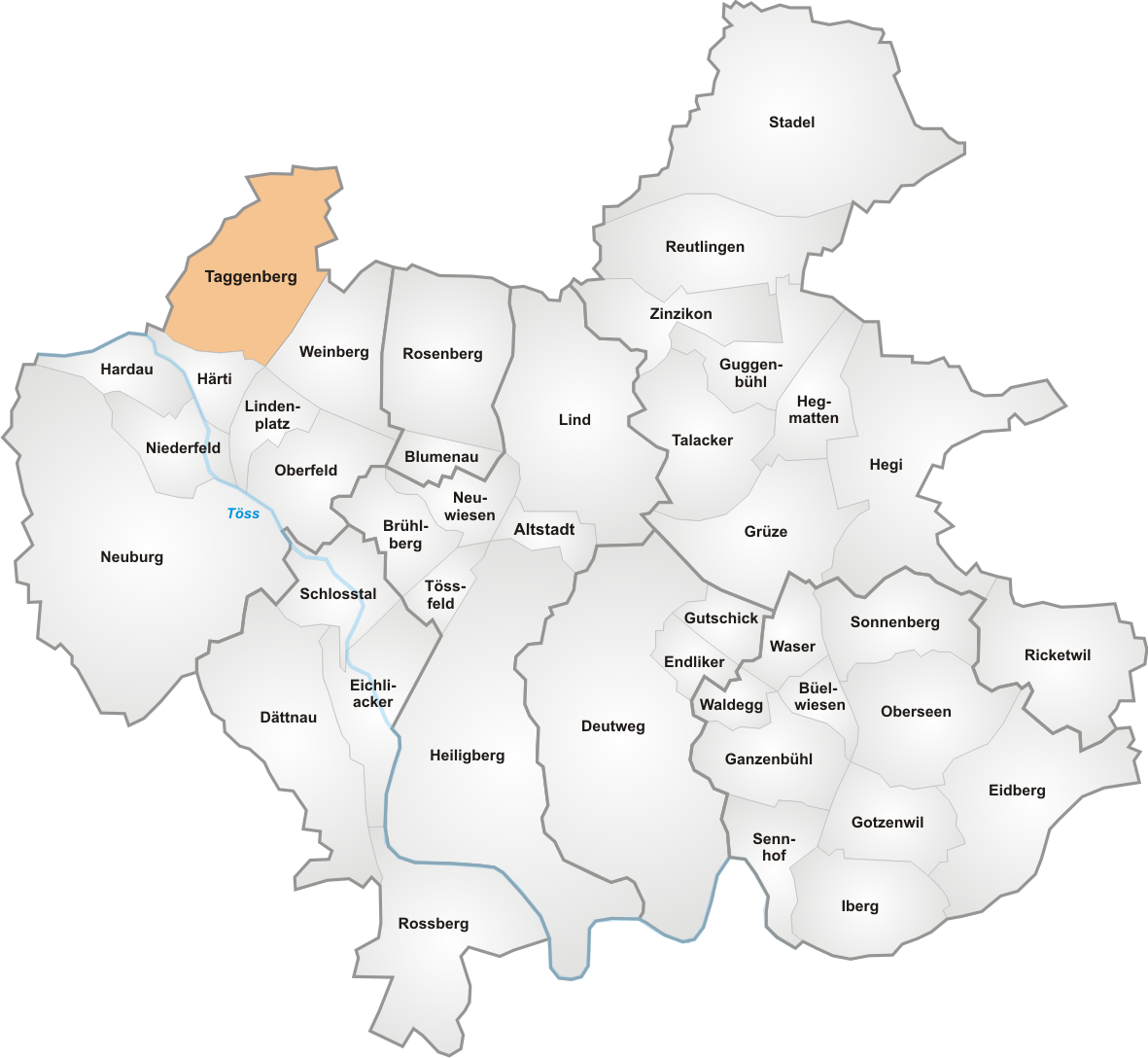
The quarter of Taggenberg in Winterthur.

Taggenberg is a quarter in the district 6 (Wülflingen) of Winterthur, Switzerland.

It was formerly a part of Wülflingen municipality, which was incorporated into Winterthur in 1922.
