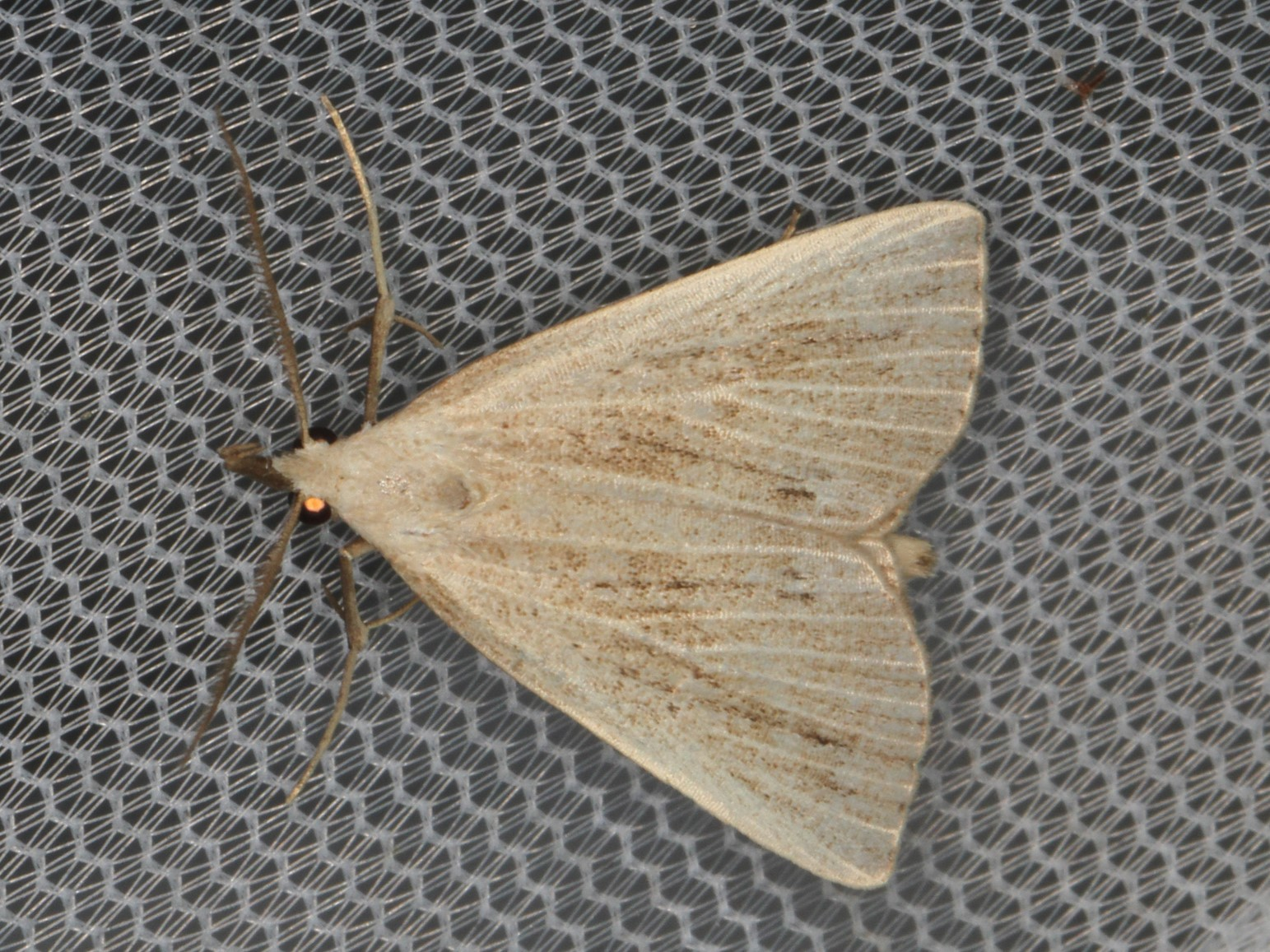

Scientific classification
- Kingdom: Animalia
- Phylum: Arthropoda
- Clade: Pancrustacea
- Class: Insecta
- Order: Lepidoptera
- Superfamily: Noctuoidea
- Family: Erebidae
- Genus: Macrochilo
- Species: M. santerivalis

Binomial name
- Macrochilo santerivalis Ferguson, 1982

= Macrochilo santerivalis =

Species of moth

Macrochilo santerivalis, commonly known as floating water plantain moth or macrochilo moth, is a species of litter moth in the family Erebidae. It is found in North America.
