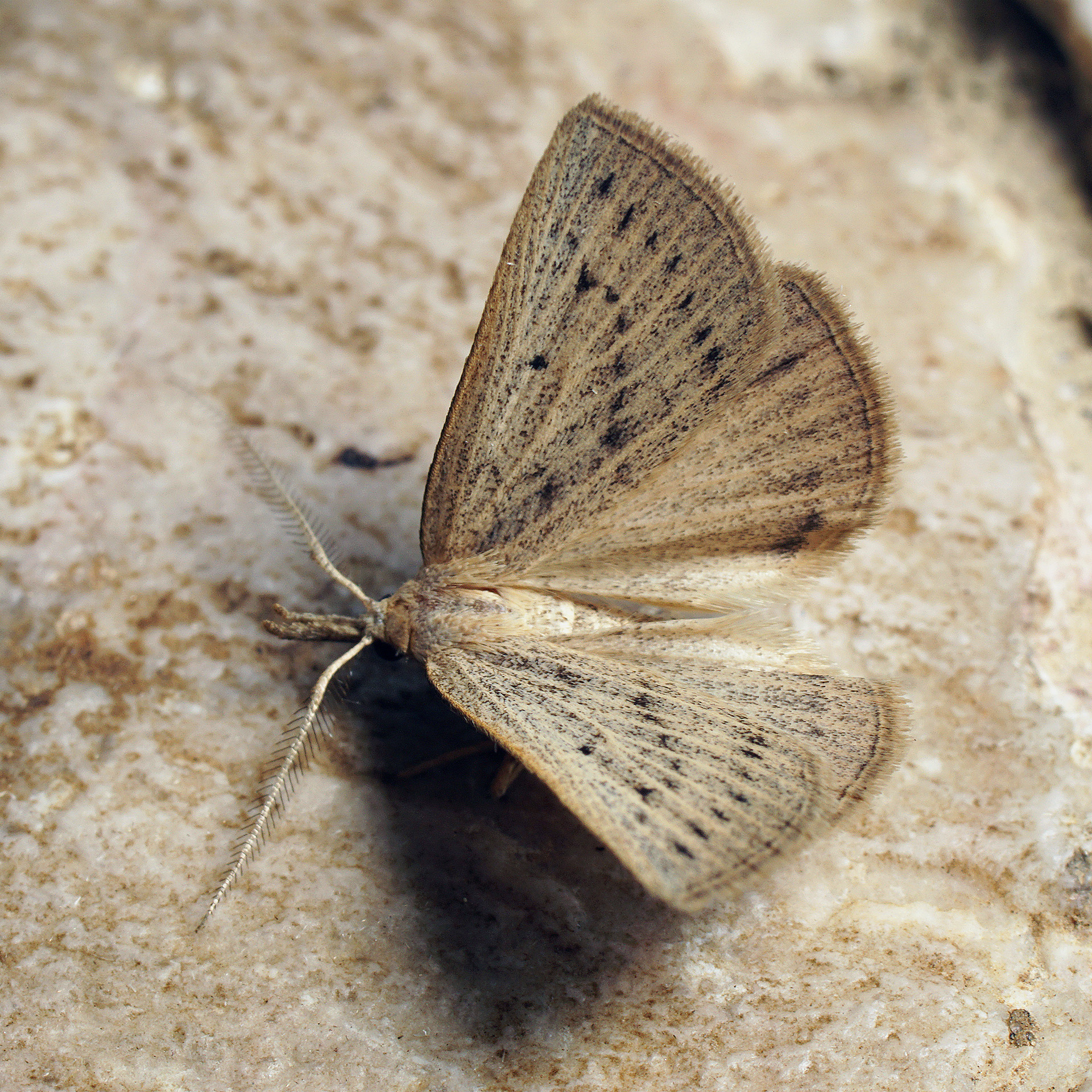

Scientific classification
- Domain: Eukaryota
- Kingdom: Animalia
- Phylum: Arthropoda
- Class: Insecta
- Order: Lepidoptera
- Superfamily: Noctuoidea
- Family: Erebidae
- Genus: Macrochilo
- Species: M. cribrumalis

Binomial name
- Macrochilo cribrumalis (Hübner, 1793)

= Macrochilo cribrumalis =

Species of moth

Macrochilo cribrumalis, the dotted fan-foot, is a litter moth of the family Erebidae. The species was first described by Jacob Hübner in 1793. It is found in Europe.

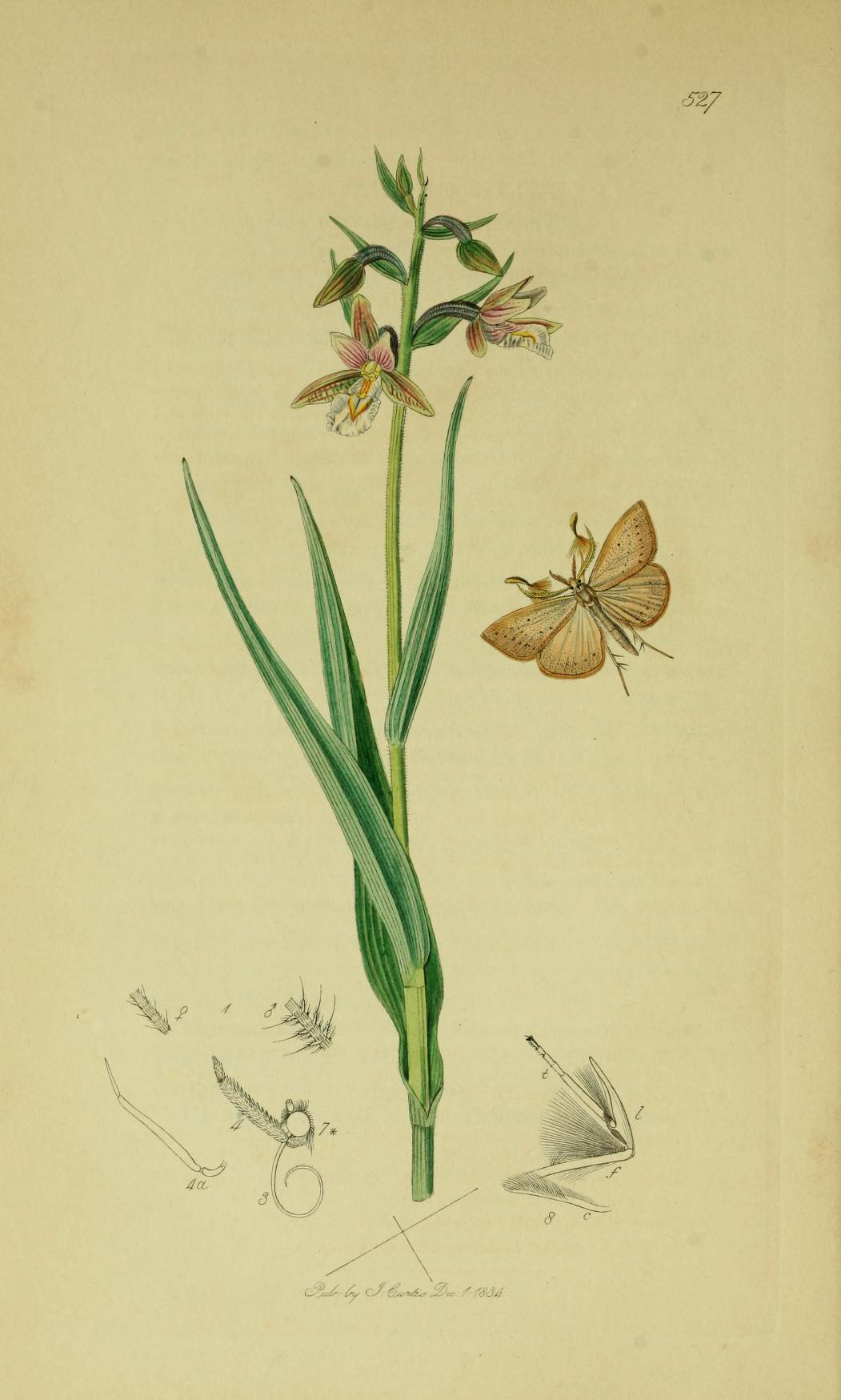
Illustration from John Curtis's British Entomology Volume 6

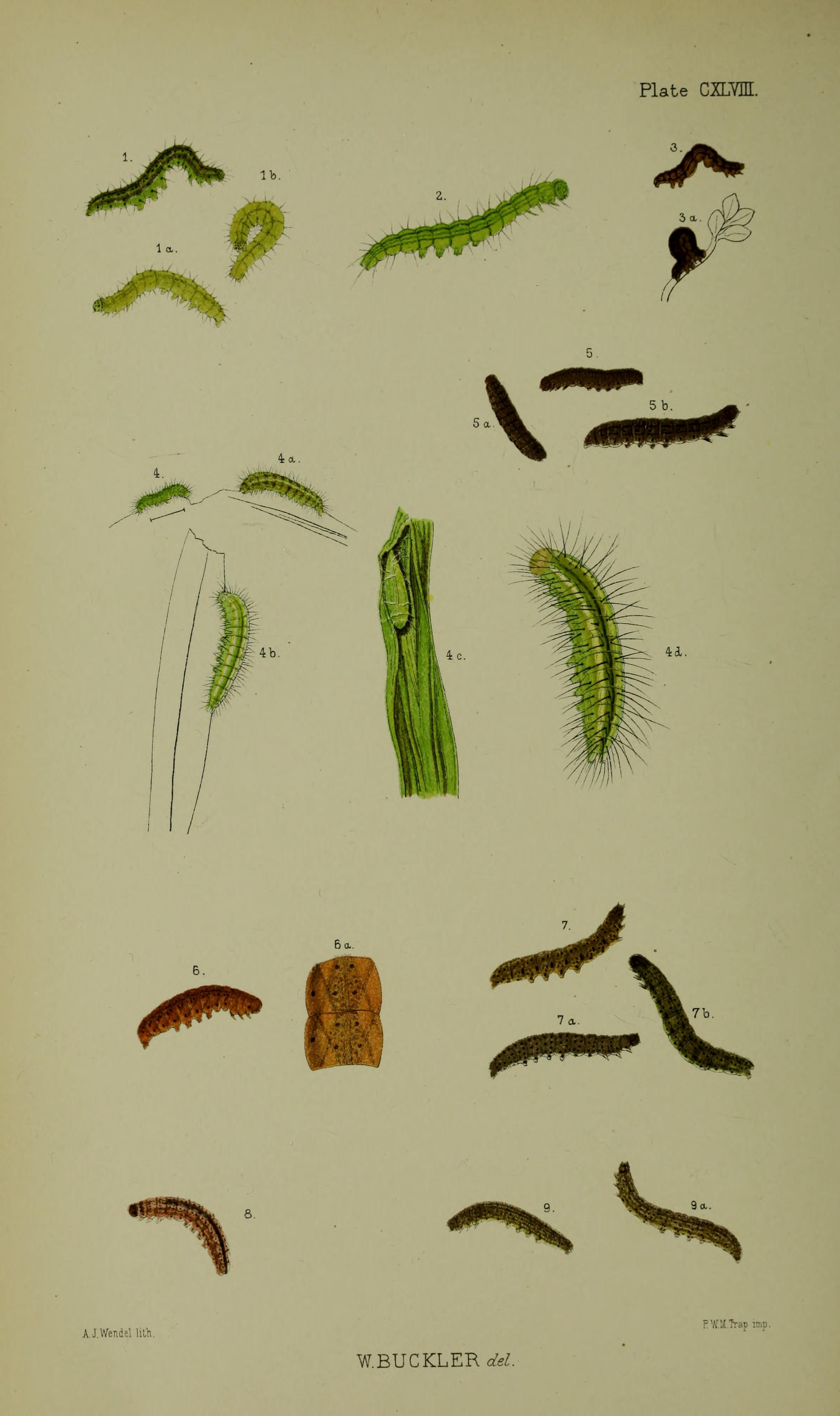
Illustration from William Buckler The Larvae of the British Butterflies and Moths Figs. 9, 9a larva in various stages of growth

The ground colour is whitish fawn and the forewing has two dotted crosslines. The wingspan is 27–30 mm. The length of the forewings is 13–14 mm. The moth flies in one generation from late May to August.

The larvae feed on various species of Cyperaceae such as Carex sylvatica but also grasses and Luzula campestris.

== Notes ==
1. The flight season refers to Belgium and the Netherlands. This may vary in other parts of the range.
