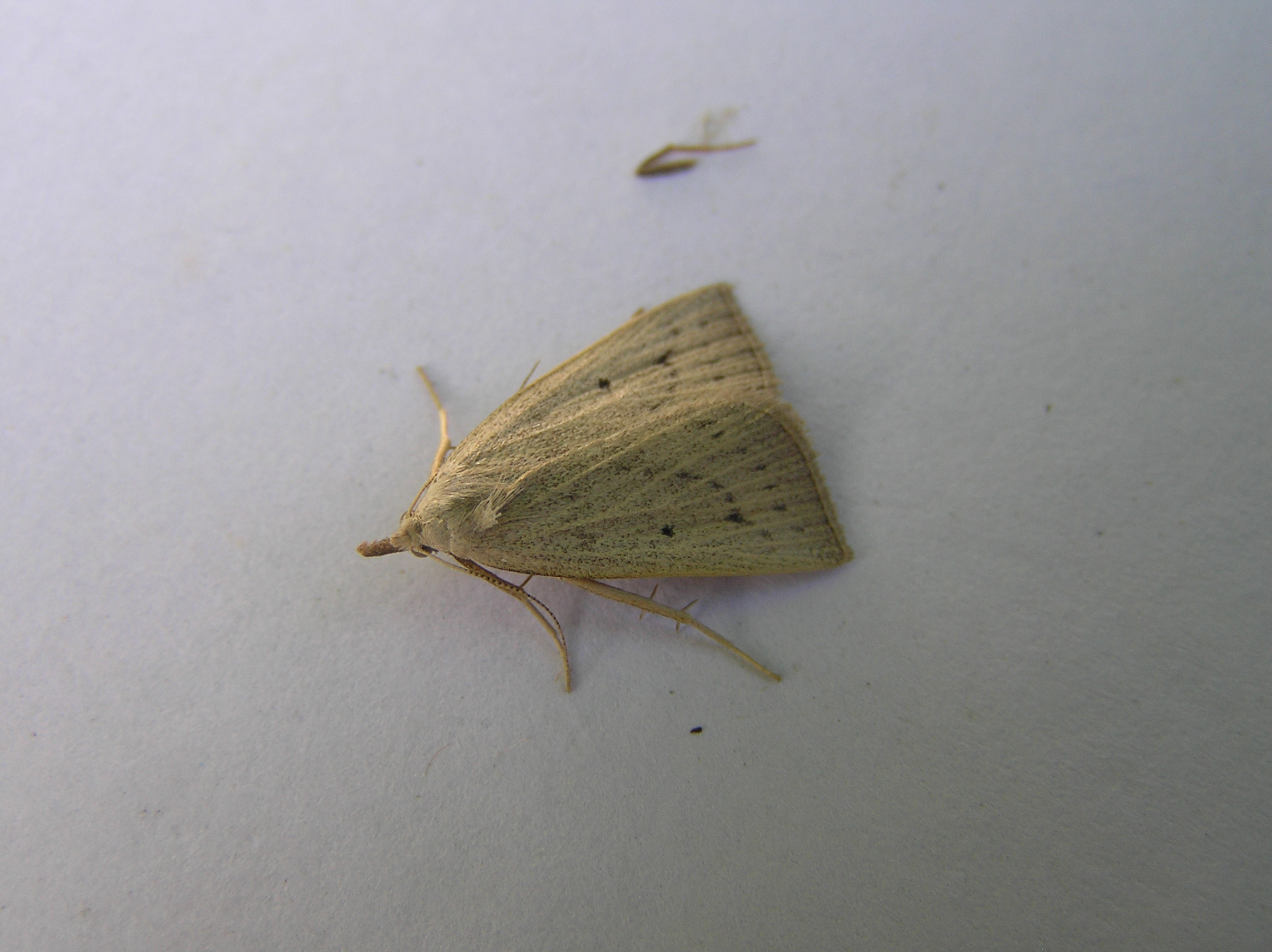
- Macrochilo cribrumalis

Scientific classification
- Kingdom: Animalia
- Phylum: Arthropoda
- Clade: Pancrustacea
- Class: Insecta
- Order: Lepidoptera
- Superfamily: Noctuoidea
- Family: Erebidae
- Subfamily: Herminiinae
- Genus: Macrochilo; Hübner, [1825]

Synonyms
- Hormisa Walker, [1859]; Litognatha Grote, 1873; Sisyrhypena Grote, 1873; Pallachira Grote, 1877; Xylormisa Forbes, 1922

= Macrochilo =

Genus of moths

Macrochilo is a genus of litter moths of the family Erebidae. They are found in North America, Europe, and Madagascar. The genus was erected by Jacob Hübner in 1825.

== Species ==
These 13 species belong to the genus Macrochilo:

- Macrochilo absorptalis Walker, 1859 (slant-lined owlet) (North America)
- Macrochilo bivittata Grote, 1877 (two-striped cord grass moth) (North America)
- Macrochilo cribrumalis (Hübner, 1793) (dotted fan-foot) (Europe)
- Macrochilo fulicalis Smith, 1907
- Macrochilo hypocritalis Ferguson, 1982 (twin-dotted owlet) (North America)
- Macrochilo iteinalis Viette, 1956 (Madagascar)
- Macrochilo litophora Grote, 1873 (brown-lined owlet) (North America)
- Macrochilo louisiana Forbes, 1922 (louisiana macrochilo) (North America)
- Macrochilo morbidalis Guenée, 1854 (North America)
- Macrochilo orciferalis Walker, 1859 (bronzy owlet) (North America)
- Macrochilo oxymoralis Viette, 1956 (Madagascar)
- Macrochilo petrealis Grote, 1880
- Macrochilo santerivalis Ferguson, 1982 (North America)
