= Weinberg (Winterthur) =

Coordinates: 47°30′48″N 8°41′59″E

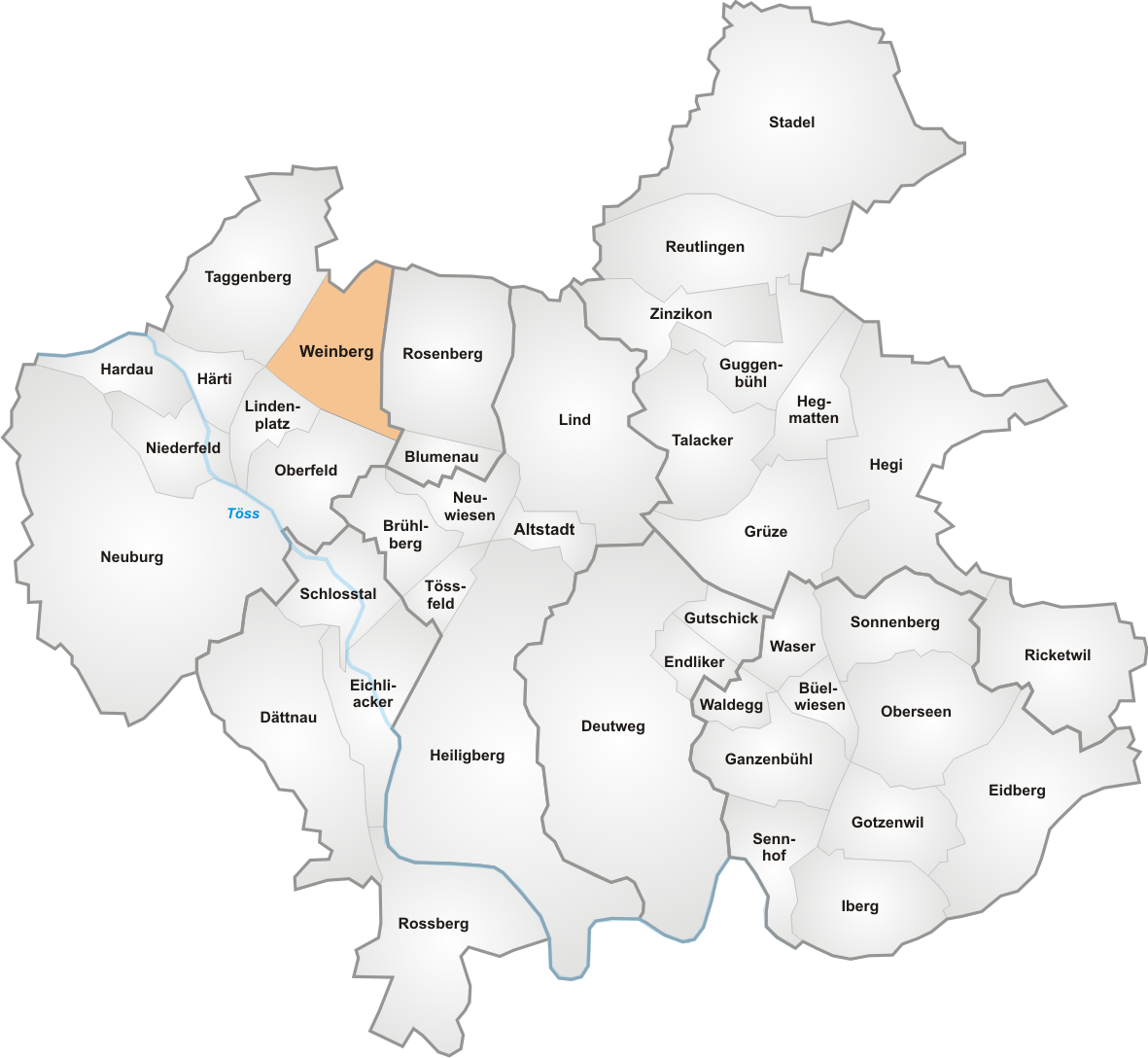
The quarter of Weinberg in Winterthur.

Weinberg is a quarter in the district 6 (Wülflingen) of Winterthur, Switzerland.

It was part of Wülflingen municipality that was amalgamated into Winterthur in 1922.

== Overview ==
Location: Weinberg is a quarter in District 6 (Wülflingen) of Winterthur, Switzerland.

Intefration: Originally part of the Wülflingen municipality, it was incorporated into Winterthur in 1922.

== Geography ==
Position: Situated in the northeastern part of Wülflingen, at the foot of the Wolfensberg.

Borders: Adjacent to the quarters of Oberfeld and Lindenplatz to the south, Taggenberg to the west, and the district of Veltheim to the east.

Natural Features: Includes parts of the Wolfensberg forest and vineyards on its slopes.

== Demographics ==
Population: As of December 31, 2022, the population was 1,180 residents.

Area: Covers an area of 1.43 square kilometers.

== Education ==
Primary Education: Children attend kindergarten and primary school at the Talhof school complex.

Secondary Education: Students attend secondary schools in nearby quarters, such as Oberfeld.

Vocational Training: Home to the Winterthur branch of the Agricultural School Strickof.

== Transportation ==
Public Transit: Served by trolleybus lines 2 and 2E, connecting to Winterthur’s main station.

Night Service: Night bus line N67 operates on weekends.

Road Access: Main access via Wülflingerstrasse, leading to the Winterthur-Wülflingen motorway junction.
