= Oberfeld (Winterthur) =

Location within Zürich, Switzerland

Coordinates: 47.508°N 8.702°E

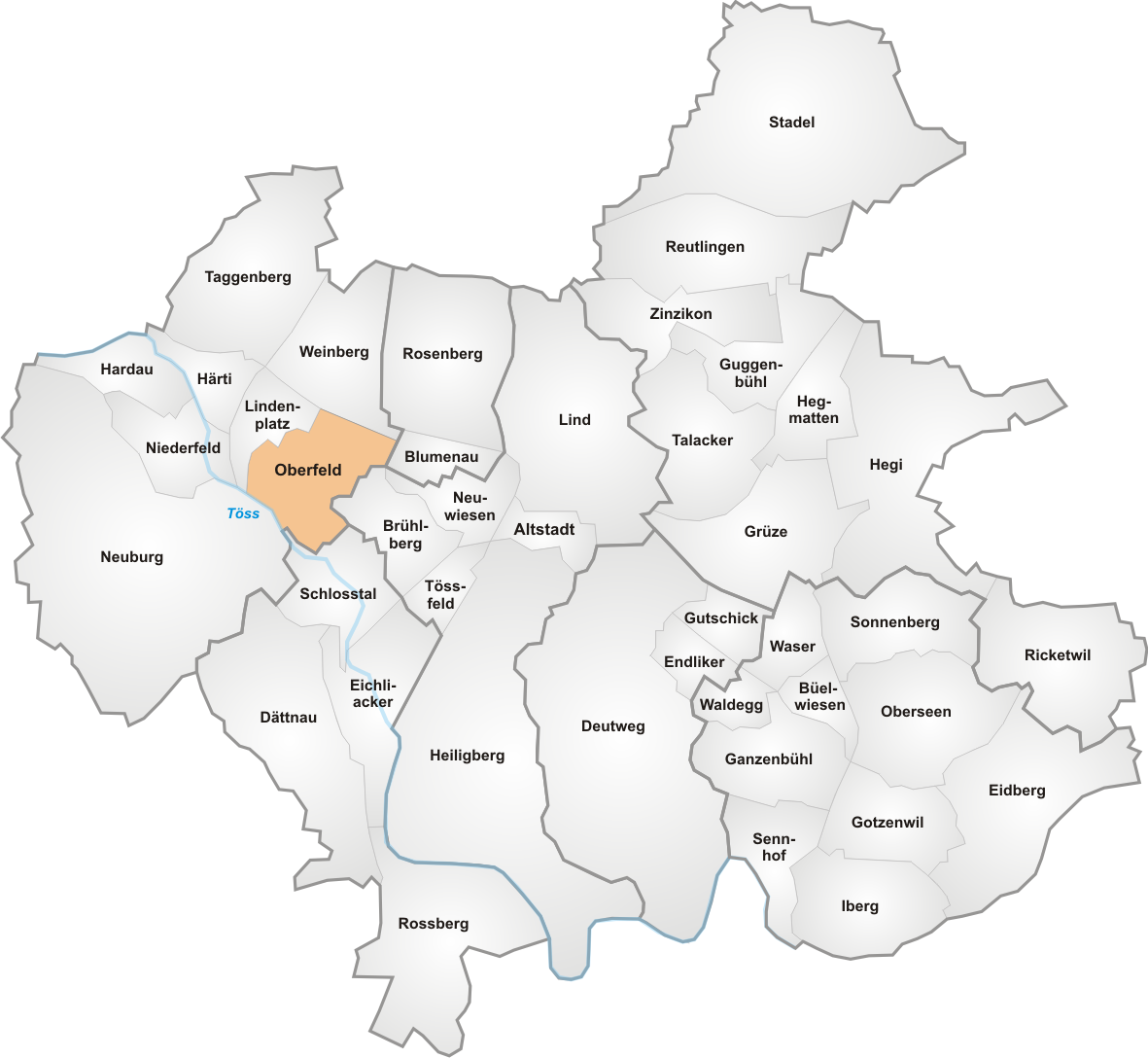
The quarter of Oberfeld in Winterthur.

Oberfeld is a quarter in the district 6 (Wülflingen) of Winterthur, Switzerland.

It was formerly a part of Wülflingen municipality, which was incorporated into Winterthur in 1922.
