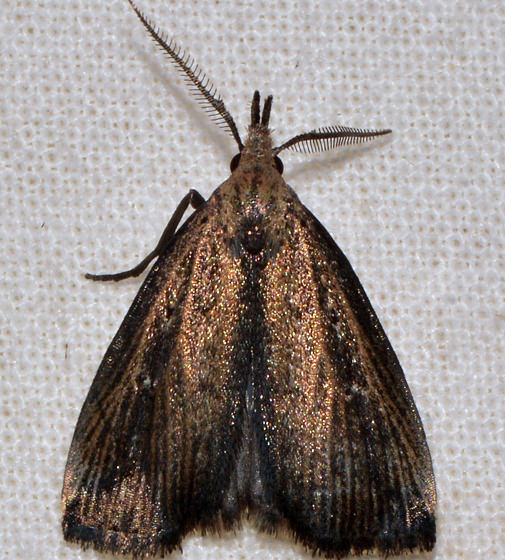

Scientific classification
- Kingdom: Animalia
- Phylum: Arthropoda
- Class: Insecta
- Order: Lepidoptera
- Superfamily: Noctuoidea
- Family: Erebidae
- Genus: Macrochilo
- Species: M. orciferalis

Binomial name
- Macrochilo orciferalis (Walker, 1859)

Synonyms
- Hormisa orciferalis Walker, 1859; Macrochilo harti French, 1894; Hormisa orciferalis pupillaris Grote, 1873

= Macrochilo orciferalis =

Species of moth

Macrochilo orciferalis, the chocolate fan-foot or bronzy macrochilo, is a litter moth of the family Erebidae. The species was first described by Francis Walker in 1859. It is found in North America from Wisconsin to Nova Scotia, south to Florida and Texas.

The wingspan is about 24 mm. Adults are on wing from June to August. There are at least two generations per year in the northeast.

Larvae have been reared on blueberry and dead grass.
