= Härti =

Coordinates: 47°30′53″N 8°41′6″E

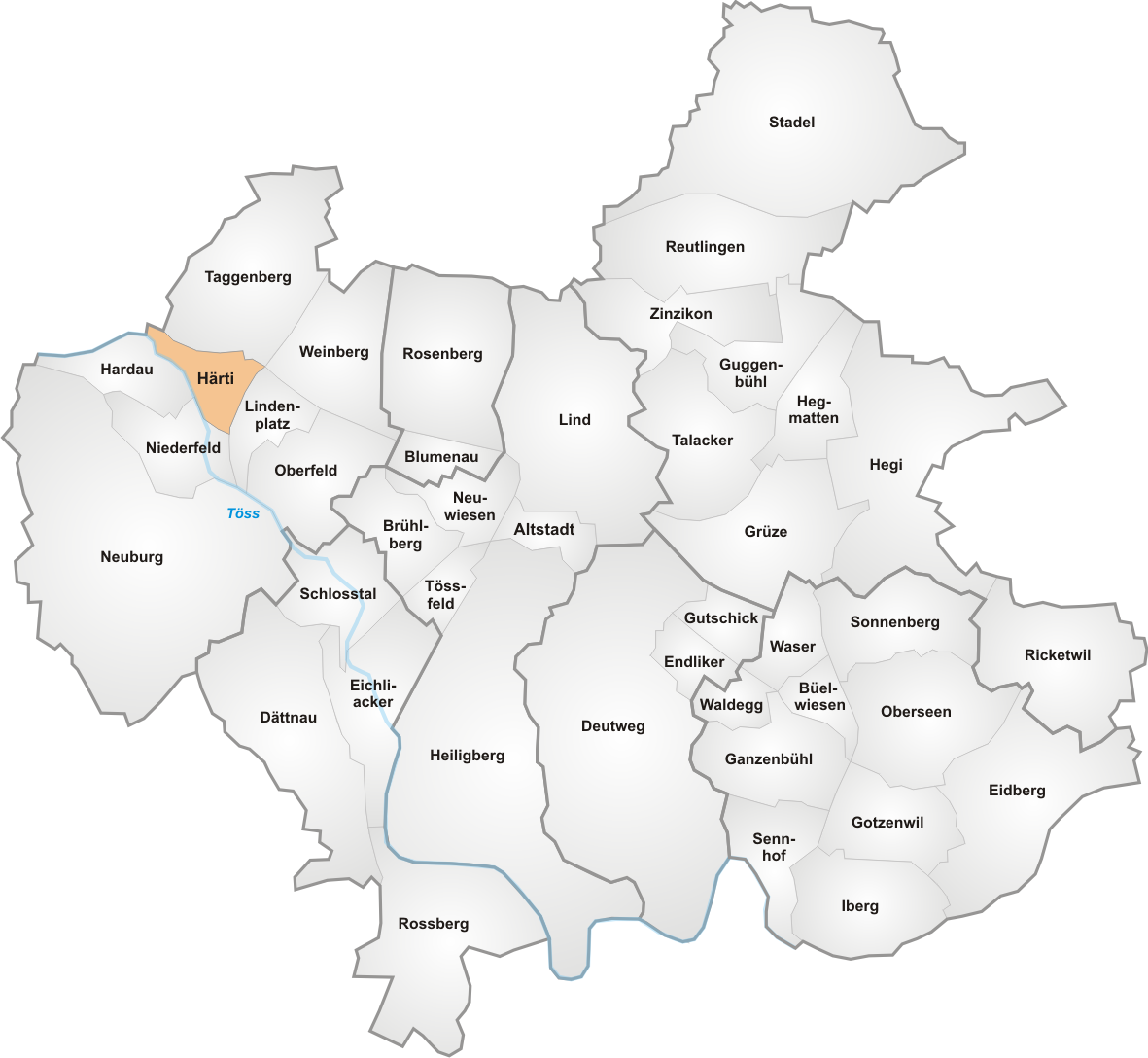
The quarter of Härti in Winterthur.

Härti is a quarter in the district 6 (Wülflingen) of Winterthur, in the canton of Zurich in northern Switzerland.

It was formerly a part of Wülflingen municipality, which was incorporated into Winterthur in 1922.
