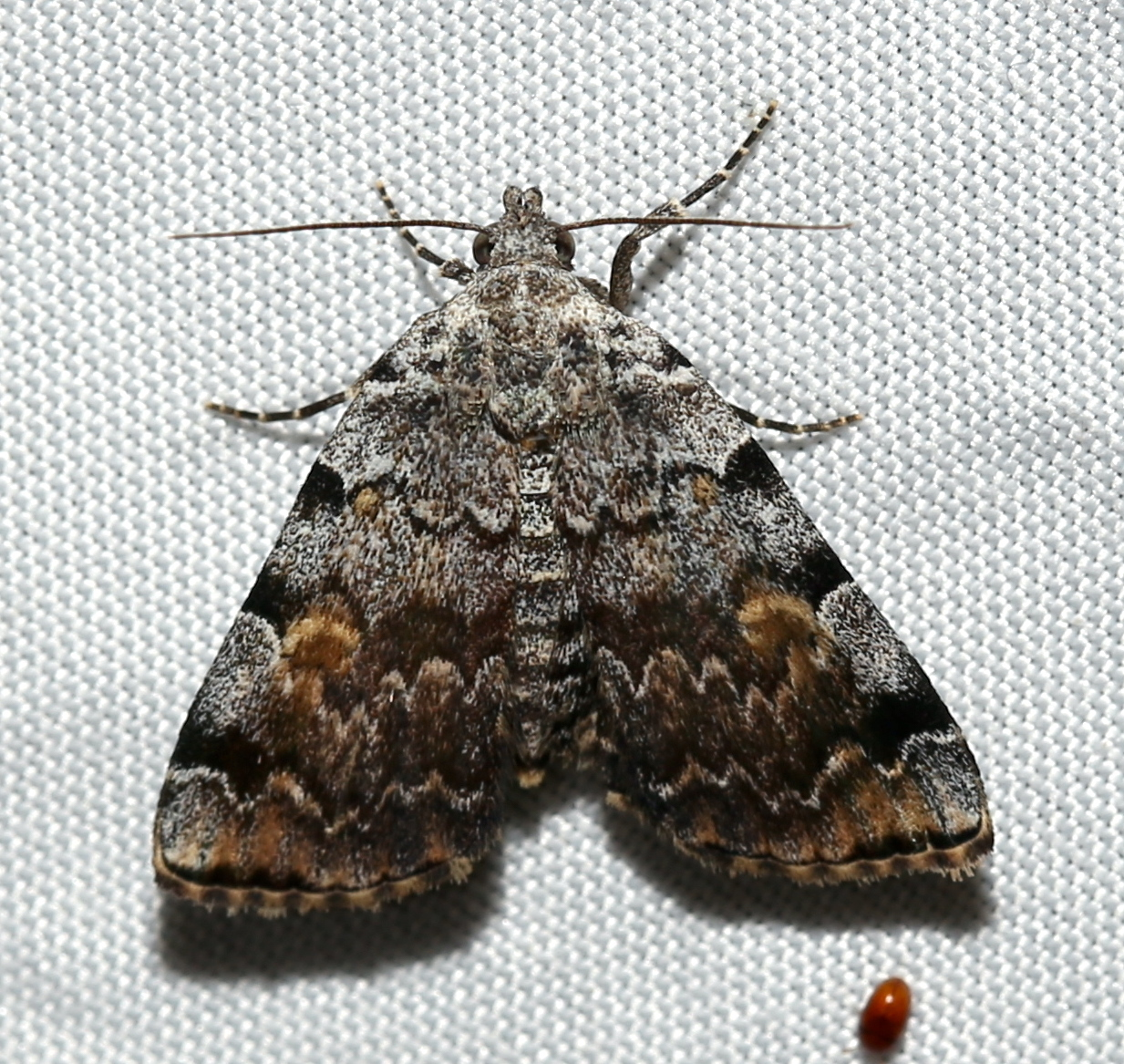

Scientific classification
- Kingdom: Animalia
- Phylum: Arthropoda
- Clade: Pancrustacea
- Class: Insecta
- Order: Lepidoptera
- Superfamily: Noctuoidea
- Family: Erebidae
- Genus: Idia
- Species: I. americalis

Binomial name
- Idia americalis (Guenée, 1854)

Synonyms
- Idia pulverosa (J. B. Smith, 1893); Idia scriptipennis (Walker, 1858)

= Idia americalis =

Species of moth

Idia americalis, the American idia or American snout, is a litter moth of the family Erebidae. The species was first described by Achille Guenée in 1854. It is commonly found in moist forests in North America, ranging from southern Canada to Florida and Texas. It is nocturnal and can be lured by sugar baits and light traps.

The American idia has forewings that range in color from grey to beige or light brown, darker toward the outer margin of the wing, with darker scalloped lines crossing the wings laterally. A dark terminal line is located at the base of the wing's fringe. All have a small bronze or brown spot located near the edge of the forewing. The hindwing is a lighter grey than the forewing and also has darker scalloped lines. Darker specimen can be dark grey or brown. The thorax and abdomen are smoothly scaled and the tibia is hairless. Female antenna are simple while male antenna are biciliate; otherwise, the sexes look similar. The caterpillar is brown with dark brown spots, a black head, and has small white hairs along its sides.

The wingspan ranges from 20 to 30 mm. Adults are on wing from May to October. They can produce two or more broods per year.

It can be differentiated from similar species, such as the common idia, by a row of dark marks located on the anterior forewing.

The larvae feed on lichen and detritus, including dead leaves. They may also function as detritivores in ant nests. Adults often feed on lichens attached to tree trunks.

== Known host plants ==
- Leguminosae - legume, pea, and bean family
- Lichens
- Angelica
- Pseudotsuga menziesii - Douglas fir
- Picea - spruce

See Robinson, G.S. et al.
