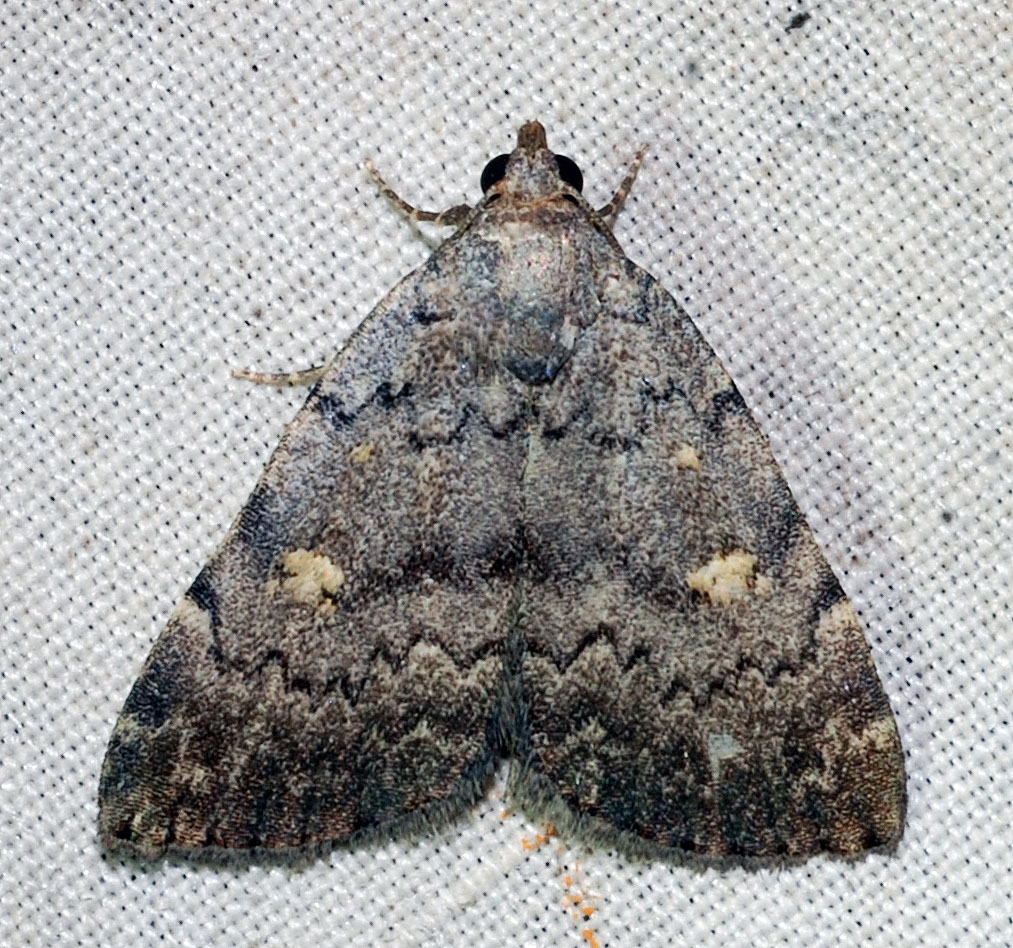

Scientific classification
- Kingdom: Animalia
- Phylum: Arthropoda
- Clade: Pancrustacea
- Class: Insecta
- Order: Lepidoptera
- Superfamily: Noctuoidea
- Family: Erebidae
- Genus: Idia
- Species: I. concisa

Binomial name
- Idia concisa Forbes, 1954

= Idia concisa =

Species of moth

Idia concisa, the pale-winged idia (also known as Idia sp. nr. aemula since it has not been formally described) is a litter moth of the family Erebidae. The species was first described by William Trowbridge Merrifield Forbes in 1954. It is widespread across much of eastern North America.

The wingspan is about 20 mm. Adults are on wing from May to October. There is one generation in the north-east.

Larvae have been reared on the dead leaves of cherry.
