= Laurentine =

Laurentine may refer to:

- A person from Laurentum, a Roman town of ancient Latium
- Laurentine Hamilton (1826–1882), Presbyterian minister
- Laurentine idia or Idia laurentii, a moth in the family Erebidae

== See also ==
- Laurentia
