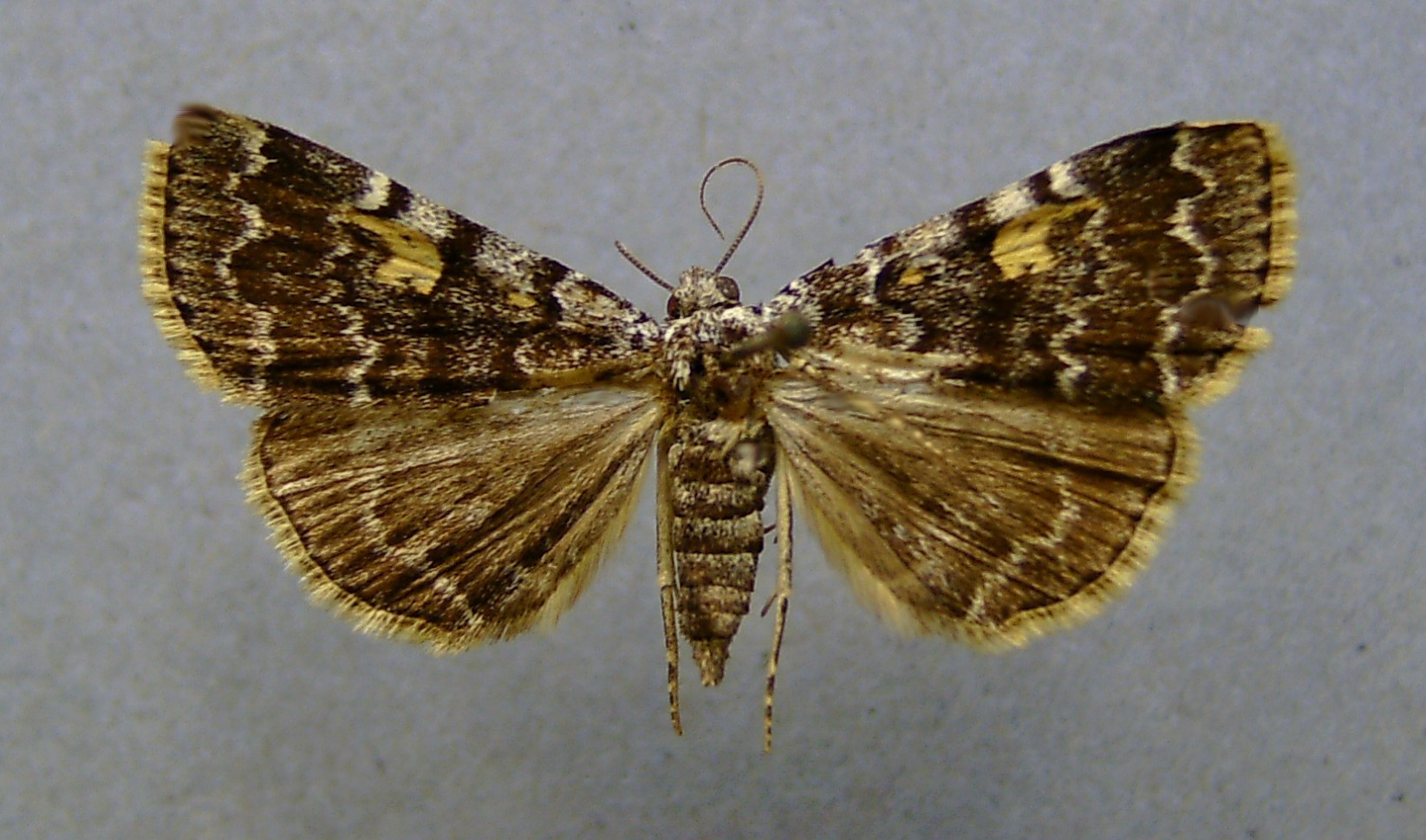

Scientific classification
- Domain: Eukaryota
- Kingdom: Animalia
- Phylum: Arthropoda
- Class: Insecta
- Order: Lepidoptera
- Superfamily: Noctuoidea
- Family: Erebidae
- Genus: Idia
- Species: I. calvaria

Binomial name
- Idia calvaria (Denis & Schiffermüller, 1775)

Synonyms
- Epizeuxis calvaria; Helia calvaria; Noctua calvaria; Epizeuxis calvarialis

= Idia calvaria =

Species of moth

Idia calvaria is a species of litter moth of the family Erebidae. It is found in Central France and northern and central Central Europe, but mostly in the surroundings of the Mediterranean Sea. It is also present in Turkey, the Caucasus and Anatolia.

The wingspan is 24–34 mm. Adults are on wing from June to September. There are two generations in the south.

The larvae feed on Populus, Salix and Rumex species.
