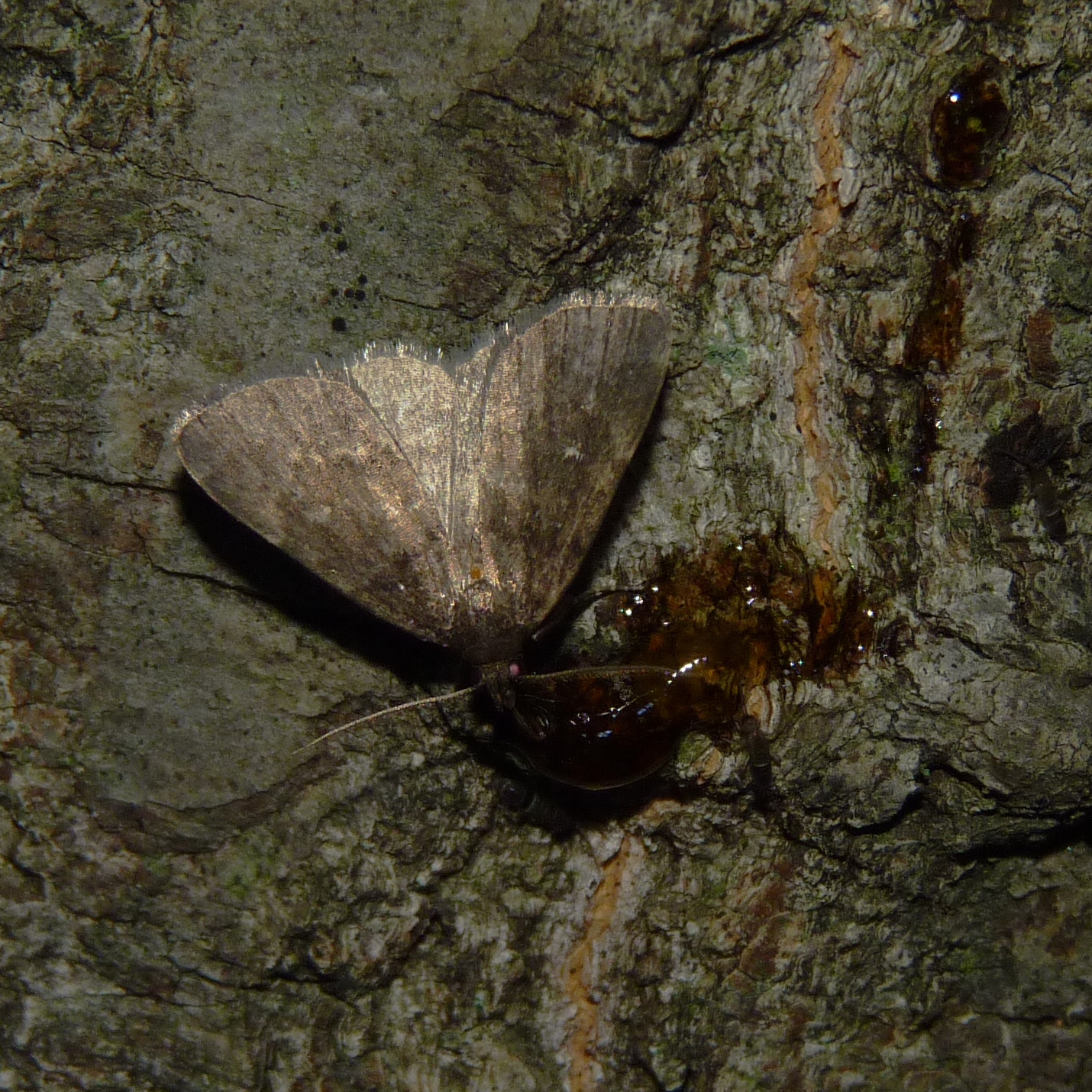

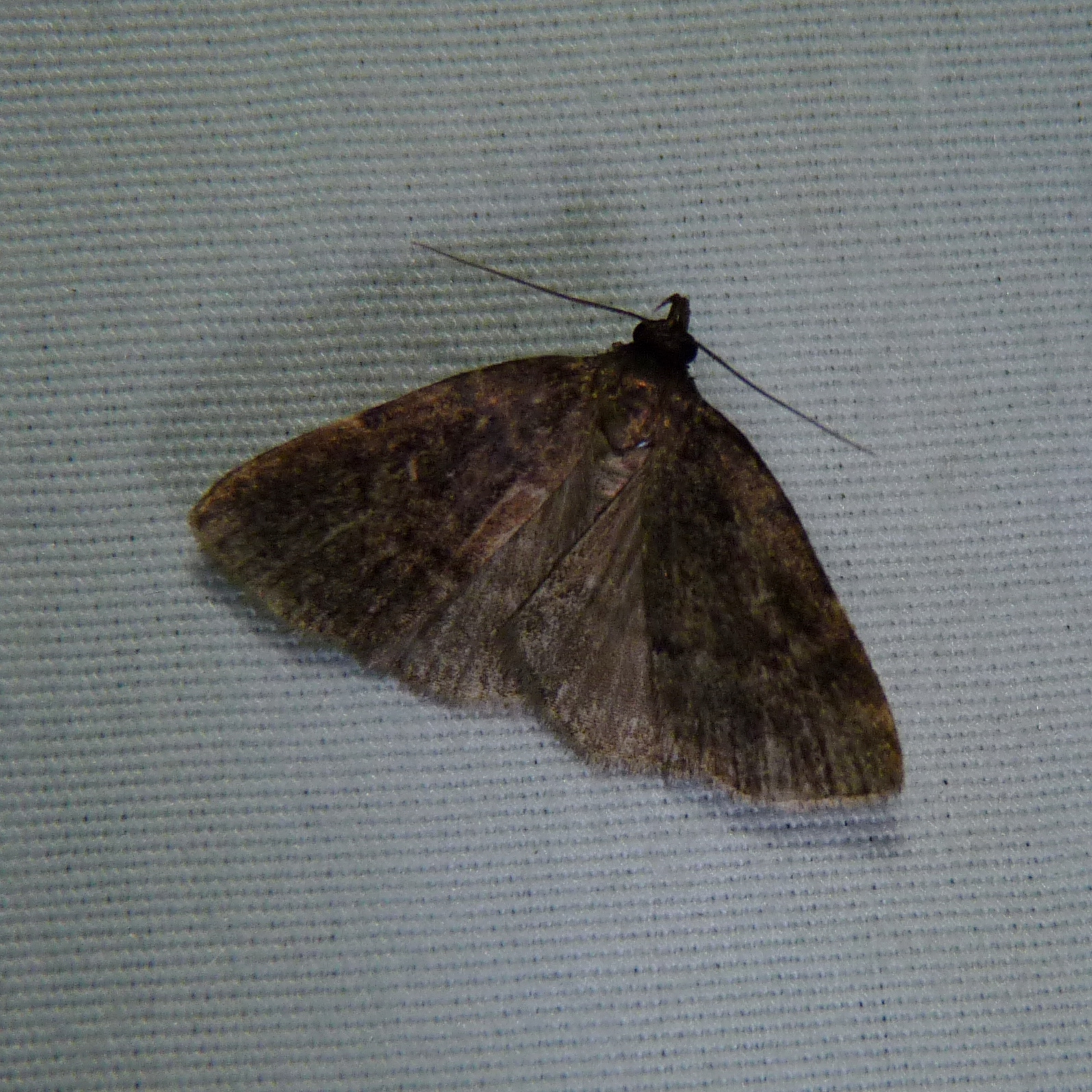

Scientific classification
- Kingdom: Animalia
- Phylum: Arthropoda
- Class: Insecta
- Order: Lepidoptera
- Superfamily: Noctuoidea
- Family: Erebidae
- Genus: Idia
- Species: I. rotundalis

Binomial name
- Idia rotundalis (Walker, 1866)

Synonyms
- Idia borealis (J. B. Smith, 1884)

= Idia rotundalis =

Species of moth

Idia rotundalis, the chocolate idia or rotund idia moth, is a litter moth of the family Erebidae. The species was first described by Francis Walker in 1866. It is found from southern Canada to Florida and Texas.

The wingspan is about 20 mm. There is one generation in the north and two or more generations in the south.

Larvae feed on detritus, including dead leaves.
