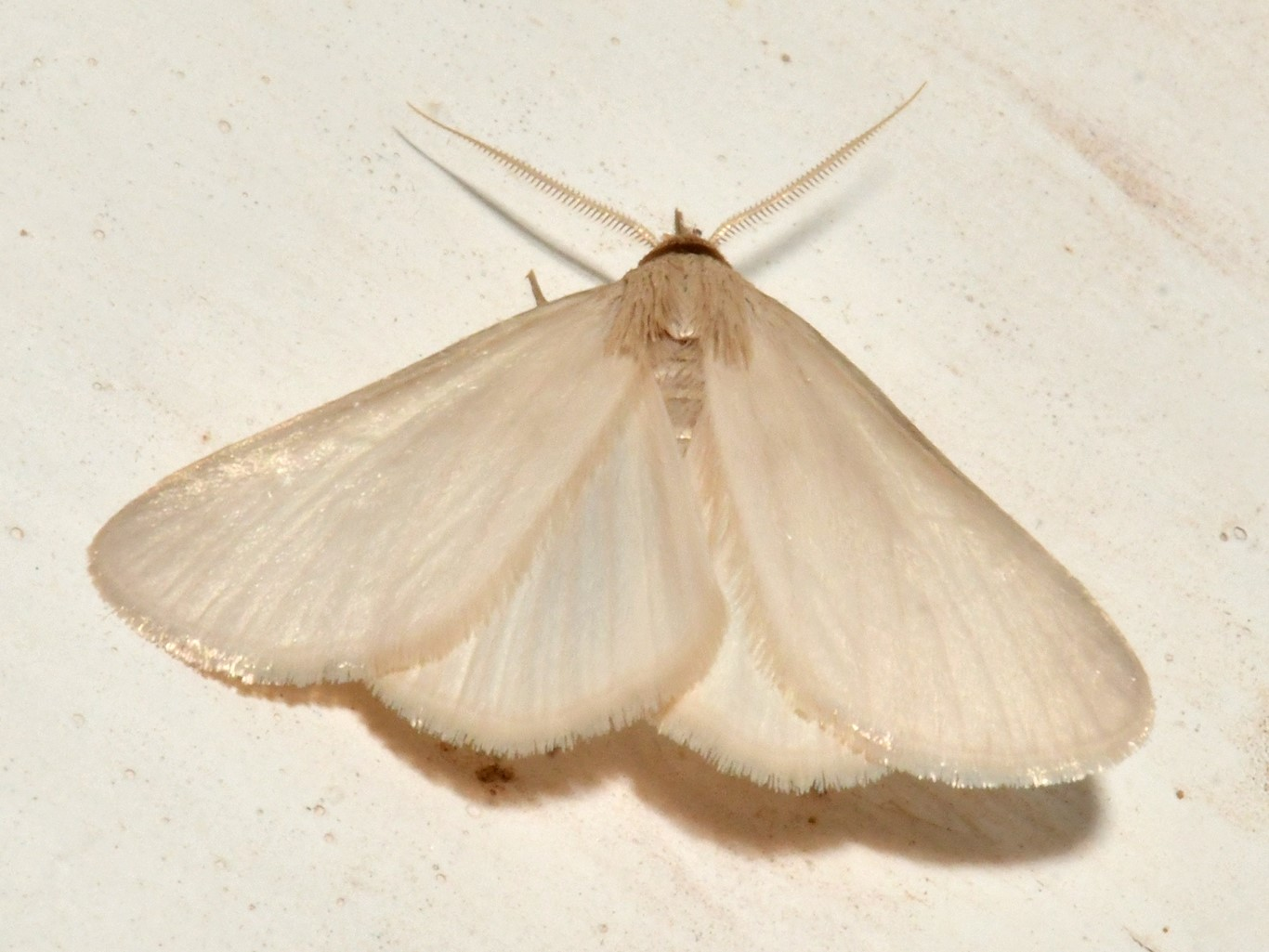

Scientific classification
- Kingdom: Animalia
- Phylum: Arthropoda
- Class: Insecta
- Order: Lepidoptera
- Superfamily: Noctuoidea
- Family: Erebidae
- Genus: Idia
- Species: I. immaculalis

Binomial name
- Idia immaculalis (Hulst, 1886)

Synonyms
- Reabotis immaculalis Hulst, 1886

= Idia immaculalis =

Species of moth

Idia immaculalis, commonly known as immaculate idia, is a species of litter moth in the family Erebidae. The species was first described by George Duryea Hulst in 1886. It is found in North America from at least California, north and east across Montana to southern Alberta and Saskatchewan.

The wingspan is 35–39 mm. Adults are on wing from June to August.
