= Idia parvulalis =

Scientific classification
- Domain: Eukaryota
- Kingdom: Animalia
- Phylum: Arthropoda
- Class: Insecta
- Order: Lepidoptera
- Superfamily: Noctuoidea
- Family: Erebidae
- Genus: Idia
- Species: I. parvulalis

Binomial name
- Idia parvulalis (Barnes & McDunnough, 1911)

Species of moth

Idia parvulalis is a species of litter moth of the family Erebidae first described by William Barnes and James Halliday McDunnough in 1911. It is found in North America, including its type location, the Santa Catalina Mountains in south-eastern Arizona.
