= Idia suffusalis =

Scientific classification
- Domain: Eukaryota
- Kingdom: Animalia
- Phylum: Arthropoda
- Class: Insecta
- Order: Lepidoptera
- Superfamily: Noctuoidea
- Family: Erebidae
- Genus: Idia
- Species: I. suffusalis

Binomial name
- Idia suffusalis (J. B. Smith, 1899)

Species of moth

Idia suffusalis is a species of litter moth of the family Erebidae. It is found in North America, including its type location, the Santa Rita Mountains in southeastern Arizona.
