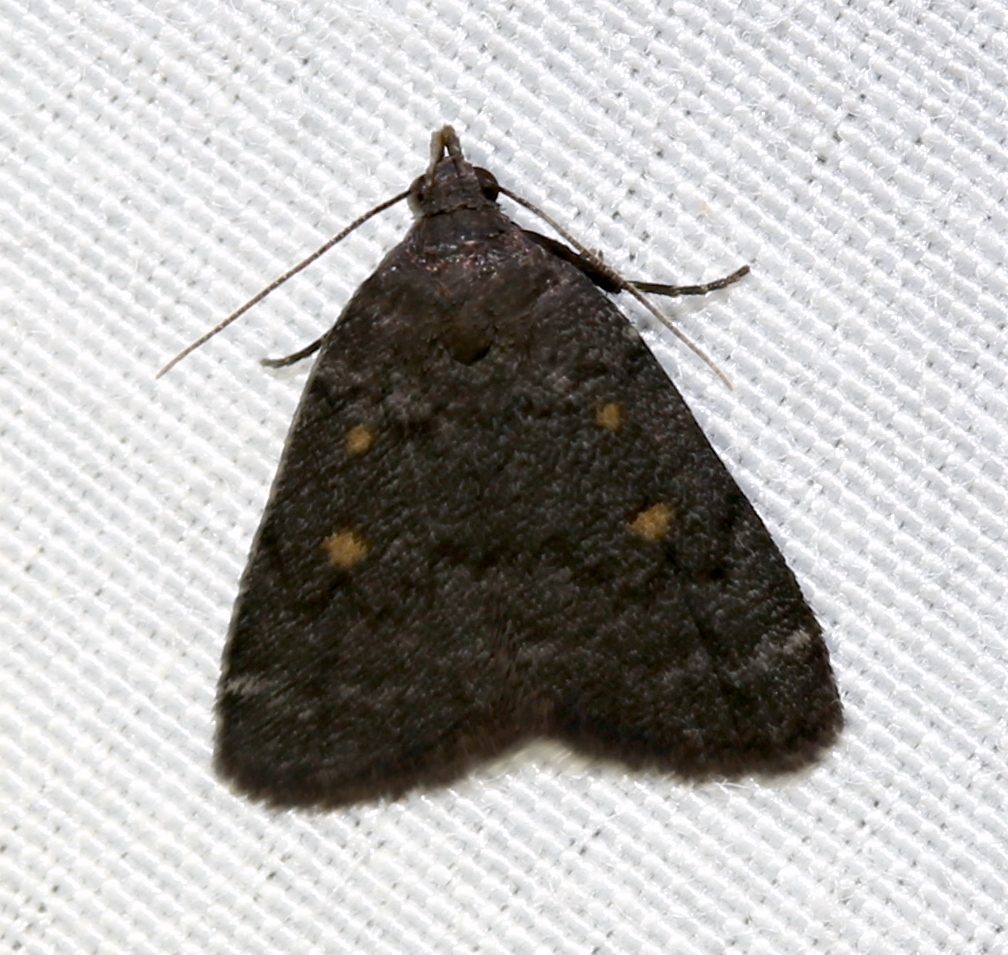

Scientific classification
- Kingdom: Animalia
- Phylum: Arthropoda
- Class: Insecta
- Order: Lepidoptera
- Superfamily: Noctuoidea
- Family: Erebidae
- Genus: Idia
- Species: I. diminuendis

Binomial name
- Idia diminuendis (Barnes & McDunnough, 1918)

= Idia diminuendis =

Species of moth

Idia diminuendis, the orange-spotted idia, is a litter moth of the family Erebidae. The species was first described by William Barnes and James Halliday McDunnough in 1918. It is found in North America from Wisconsin to Nova Scotia, south to Florida and Texas.

The wingspan is about 16 mm. There are two generations in most of the range.

Larvae feed on detritus, including dead leaves.
