= Idia majoralis =

Scientific classification
- Domain: Eukaryota
- Kingdom: Animalia
- Phylum: Arthropoda
- Class: Insecta
- Order: Lepidoptera
- Superfamily: Noctuoidea
- Family: Erebidae
- Genus: Idia
- Species: I. majoralis

Binomial name
- Idia majoralis (J. B. Smith, 1895)

Species of moth

Idia majoralis, the greater idia, is a litter moth of the family Erebidae. The species was first described by J. B. Smith in 1895. It is found in Canada from Ontario and Quebec, south into the United States, where it has been recorded from Illinois, Wisconsin and Missouri.
