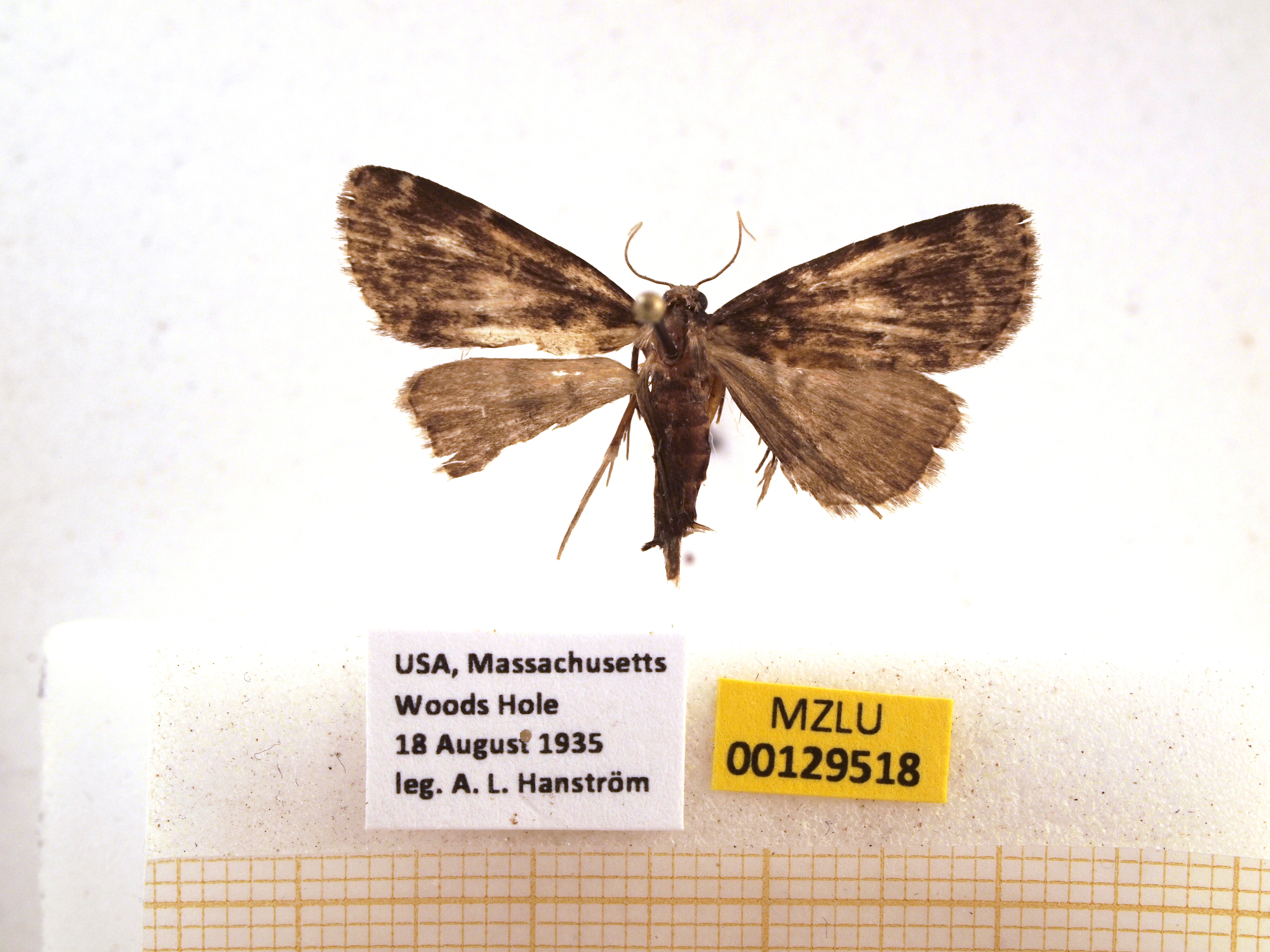

Scientific classification
- Domain: Eukaryota
- Kingdom: Animalia
- Phylum: Arthropoda
- Class: Insecta
- Order: Lepidoptera
- Superfamily: Noctuoidea
- Family: Erebidae
- Genus: Idia
- Species: I. denticulalis

Binomial name
- Idia denticulalis (Harvey, 1875)

Synonyms
- Pseudaglossa denticulalis Harvey, 1875

= Idia denticulalis =

Species of moth

Idia denticulalis, the toothed idia, is a litter moth of the family Erebidae. The species was first described by Leon F. Harvey in 1875. It is found in Quebec, Canada, and the US from Wisconsin to New England, south to Alabama and Texas.

The wingspan is about 25 mm. Adults are on wing from April to September in Maryland and from July to August in Quebec. There is one generation per year in the north, two or more generations on the south.

Larvae feed on lichen and detritus, including dead leaves.
