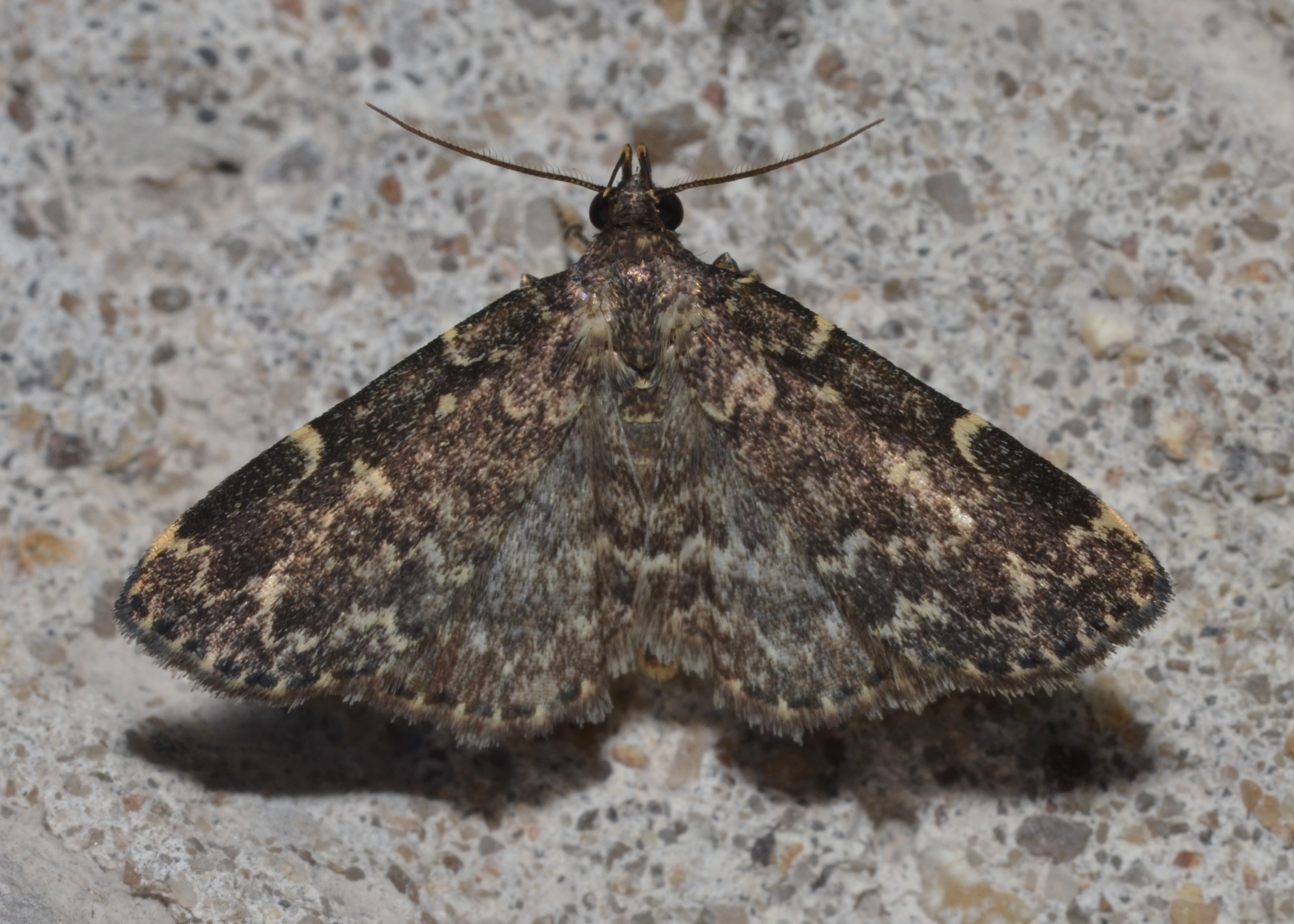

Scientific classification
- Kingdom: Animalia
- Phylum: Arthropoda
- Class: Insecta
- Order: Lepidoptera
- Superfamily: Noctuoidea
- Family: Erebidae
- Genus: Idia
- Species: I. scobialis

Binomial name
- Idia scobialis (Grote, 1880)

= Idia scobialis =

Species of moth

Idia scobialis, the smoky idia, is a species of litter moth in the family Erebidae. The species was first described by Augustus Radcliffe Grote in 1880. It is found in North America from Michigan, southern Quebec and Maine, south to Florida and at least Kentucky.

The wingspan is about 20 mm. There is one generation per year.

Larvae feed on detritus, including dead leaves.
