= Idia terrebralis =

Scientific classification
- Domain: Eukaryota
- Kingdom: Animalia
- Phylum: Arthropoda
- Class: Insecta
- Order: Lepidoptera
- Superfamily: Noctuoidea
- Family: Erebidae
- Genus: Idia
- Species: I. terrebralis

Binomial name
- Idia terrebralis Barnes & McDunnough, 1912

Species of moth

Idia terrebralis is a species of litter moth of the family Erebidae first described by William Barnes and James Halliday McDunnough in 1912. It is found in North America, including Illinois.
