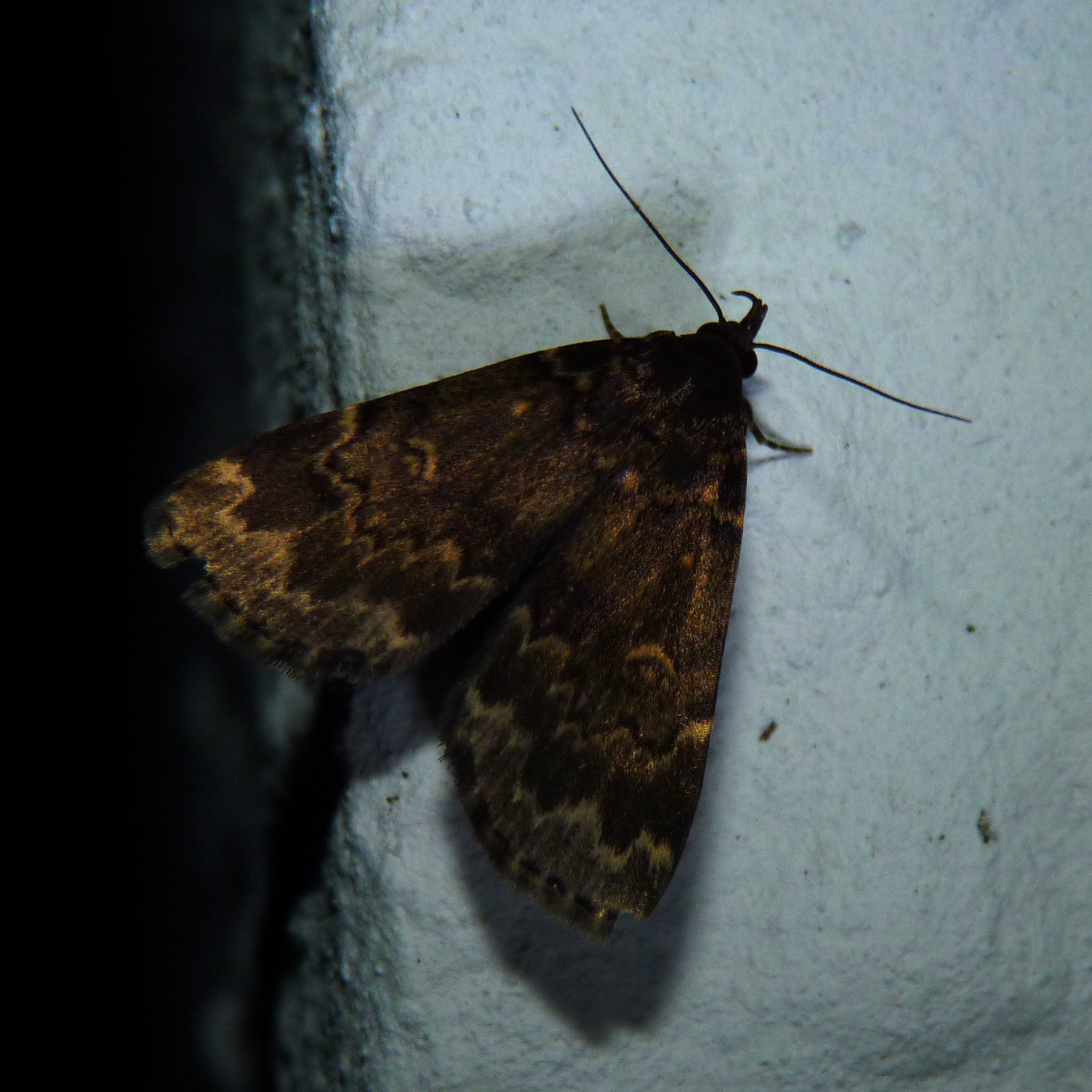

Scientific classification
- Kingdom: Animalia
- Phylum: Arthropoda
- Clade: Pancrustacea
- Class: Insecta
- Order: Lepidoptera
- Superfamily: Noctuoidea
- Family: Erebidae
- Genus: Idia
- Species: I. lubricalis

Binomial name
- Idia lubricalis (Geyer, 1832)

Synonyms
- Idia bistrigalis (Stephens, 1834); Idia phacalis (Guenée, 1854); Idia surrectalis (Walker, 1859)

= Idia lubricalis =

Species of moth

Idia lubricalis, the glossy black idia, is a litter moth of the family Erebidae. The species was first described by Carl Geyer in 1832. It is found from Canada south to Florida and Texas in deciduous forests.

Idia occidentalis was formerly considered a subspecies of Idia lubricalis.

The wingspan is 24–36 mm. Adults are on wing from May to September. There are multiple generations per year in the south.

The larvae feed on various fungi and lichens. They probably feed on other organic matter like rotting wood and grass on forest floor as well.

== Subspecies ==
- Idia lubricalis partitalis
- Idia lubricalis cobeta

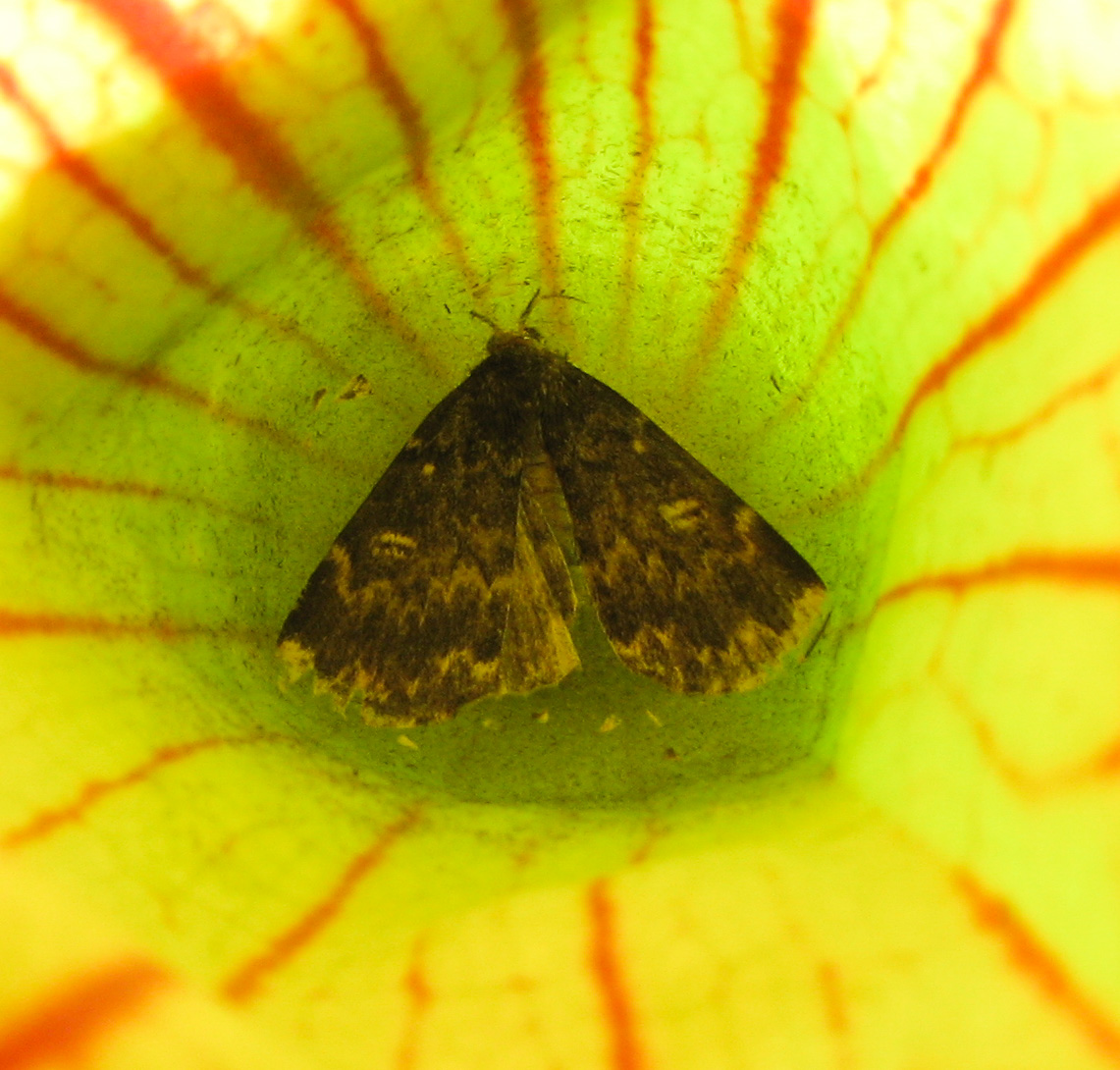
Trapped in Sarracenia purpurea
