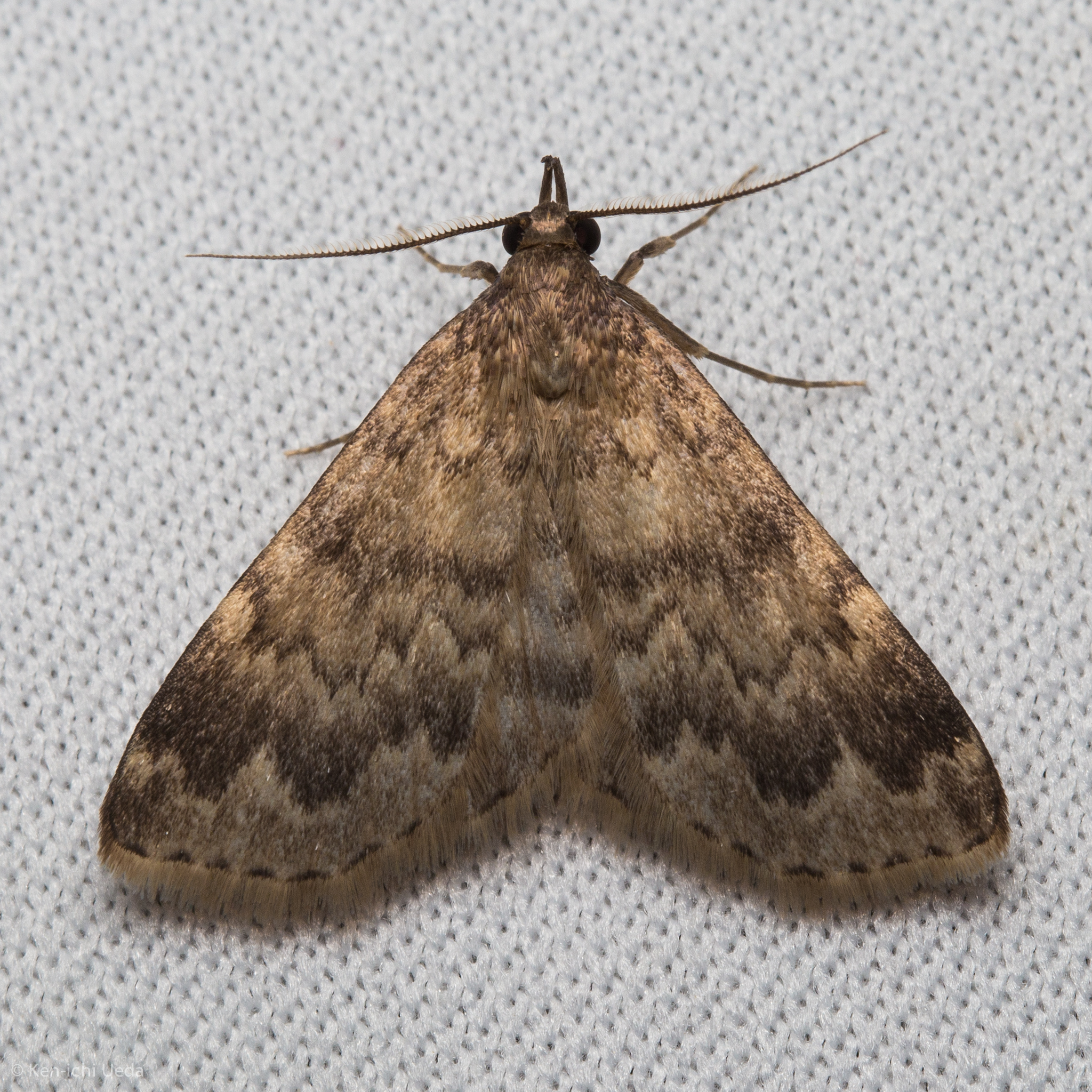

Scientific classification
- Domain: Eukaryota
- Kingdom: Animalia
- Phylum: Arthropoda
- Class: Insecta
- Order: Lepidoptera
- Superfamily: Noctuoidea
- Family: Erebidae
- Genus: Idia
- Species: I. occidentalis

Binomial name
- Idia occidentalis (Smith, 1884)

Synonyms
- Idia lubricalis occidentalis; Idia partitalis (Smith, 1908)

= Idia occidentalis =

Species of moth

Idia occidentalis is a species of litter moth of the family Erebidae first described by Smith in 1884. It is found in North America from southern Alberta and British Columbia, south to Colorado, Arizona and California.

It was formerly considered a subspecies of Idia lubricalis.

The wingspan is about 30 mm. Adults are on wing in August in the north.

The insect has a yellow-brown colour, and a "cloudy" pattern. It is said the insect's flight history is from May to October, and that it seems to occupy: dry open areas, arid native grasslands, and badlands.
