= Idia julia =

Scientific classification
- Domain: Eukaryota
- Kingdom: Animalia
- Phylum: Arthropoda
- Class: Insecta
- Order: Lepidoptera
- Superfamily: Noctuoidea
- Family: Erebidae
- Genus: Idia
- Species: I. julia

Binomial name
- Idia julia (Barnes & McDunnough, 1918)

Species of moth

Idia julia, or Julia's idia, is a litter moth of the family Erebidae. The species was first described by William Barnes and James Halliday McDunnough in 1918. It is found from southern Canada south to Georgia and Texas.

The wingspan is about 17 mm. There is one generation in the north and multiple generations in the south.

Larvae feed on detritus, including dead leaves.
