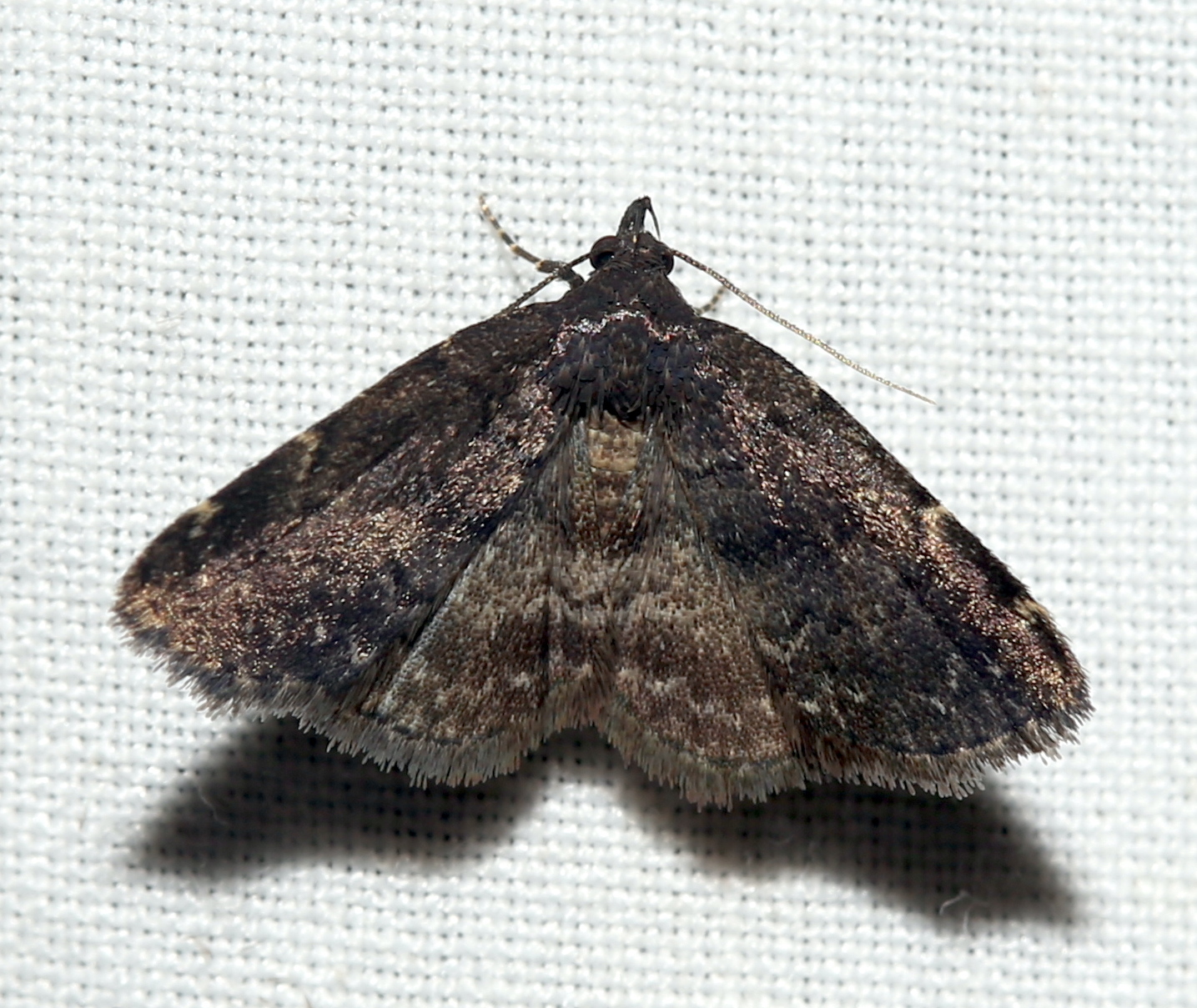

Scientific classification
- Kingdom: Animalia
- Phylum: Arthropoda
- Class: Insecta
- Order: Lepidoptera
- Superfamily: Noctuoidea
- Family: Erebidae
- Genus: Idia
- Species: I. forbesii

Binomial name
- Idia forbesii (French, 1894)

Synonyms
- Idia merricki (J. B. Smith, 1905)

= Idia forbesii =

Species of moth

Idia forbesii, or Forbes' idia moth, is a litter moth of the family Erebidae. The species was first described by George Hazen French in 1894. It is found in North America from Wisconsin to Quebec, south to Florida and Texas.

The wingspan is about 17 mm. There is one generation in the north and multiple generations in the south.

Larvae feed on detritus, including dead leaves.
