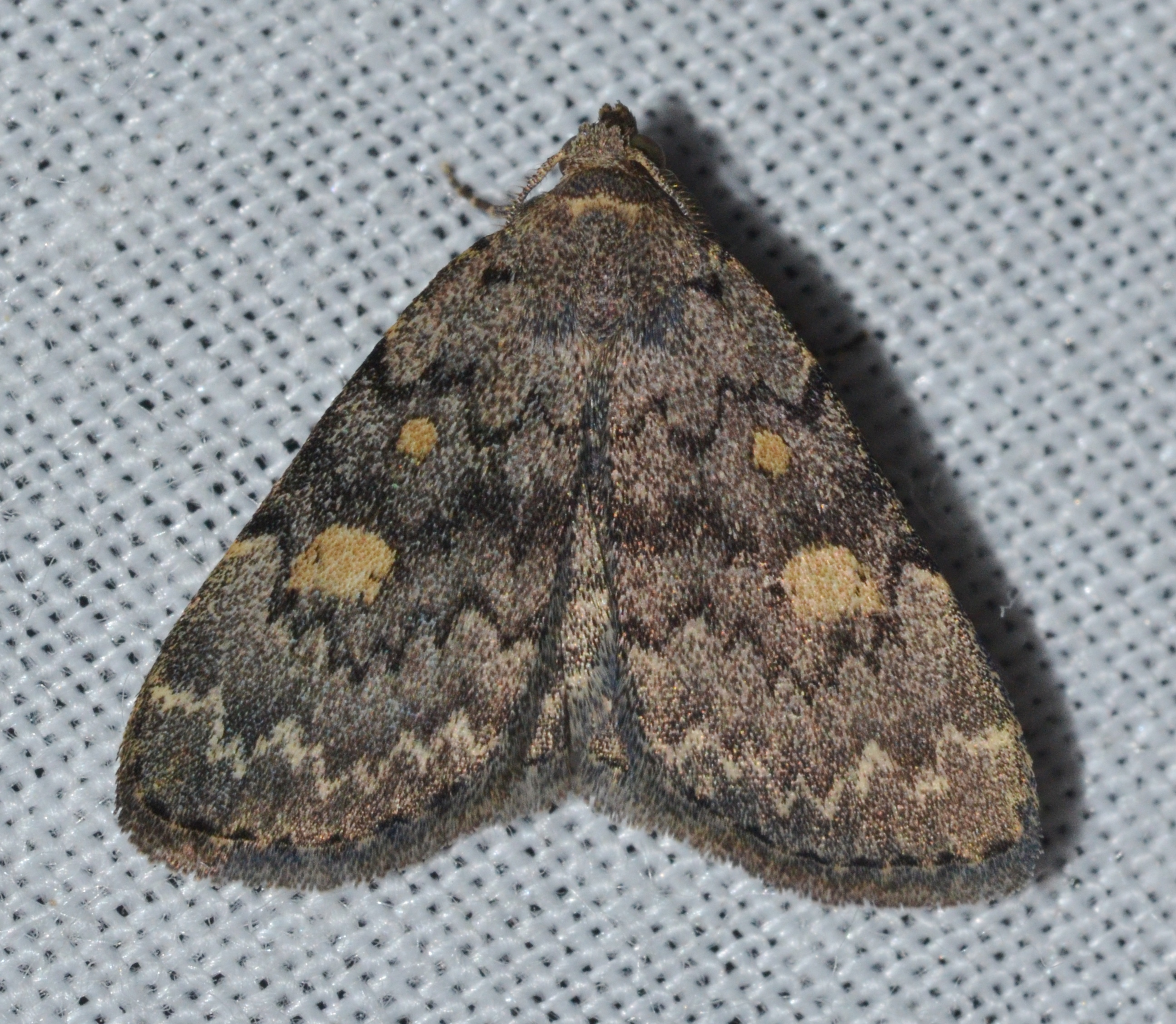
- Idia aemula

Scientific classification
- Domain: Eukaryota
- Kingdom: Animalia
- Phylum: Arthropoda
- Class: Insecta
- Order: Lepidoptera
- Superfamily: Noctuoidea
- Family: Erebidae
- Subfamily: Herminiinae
- Genus: Idia; Hübner, 1813

Synonyms
- Reabotis J. B. Smith, [1903]; Epizeuxis Hübner, 1818; Camptylochila Stephens, 1834; Helia Duponchel, 1845; Campylochila Agassiz, [1847]; Helia Guenée, 1854; Pseudaglossa Grote, 1874; Zenomia Dognin, 1914

= Idia (moth) =

Genus of moths

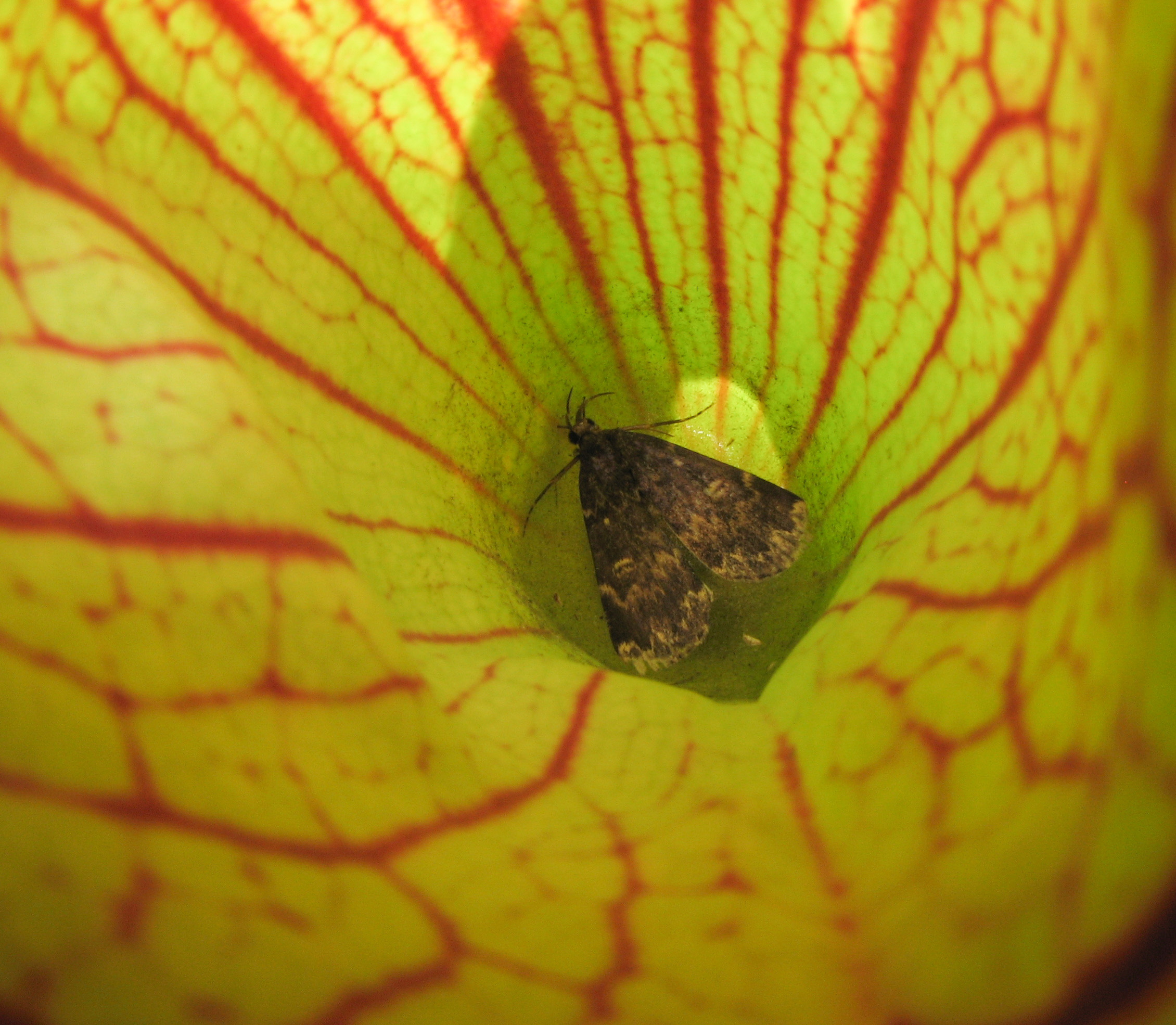
Idia lubricalis (glossy black idia) moth on Sarracenia purpurea

Idia is a genus of litter moths of the family Erebidae first described by Jacob Hübner in 1813.

== Description ==
Palpi sickle shaped and slender, where the second joint reaching above vertex of head. Thorax and abdomen smoothly scaled. Tibia hairless. Forewings with round apex. Hindwings with vein 5 from lower angle of cell.

== Species ==
Species include the following:

- Idia aemula Hübner, 1813 – common idia moth, powdered snout moth or waved tabby moth
- Idia americalis Guenée, 1854 – American idia moth or American snout moth
- Idia calvaria Denis & Schiffermüller, 1775
- Idia denticulalis (Harvey, 1875) – toothed idia moth
- Idia diminuendis Barnes & McDunnough, 1918 – orange-spotted idia moth
- Idia forbesii French, 1894 – Forbes' idia moth
- Idia gopheri J. B. Smith, 1899 – tortoise commensal noctuid moth
- Idia immaculalis (Hulst, 1886) – immaculate idia moth
- Idia julia Barnes & McDunnough, 1918 – Julia's idia moth
- Idia laurentii J. B. Smith, 1893 – Laurentine idia moth
- Idia lubricalis Geyer, 1832 – glossy black idia moth
- Idia majoralis J. B. Smith, 1895 – greater idia moth
- Idia occidentalis (Smith, 1884)
- Idia parvulalis Barnes & McDunnough, 1911
- Idia rotundalis Walker, 1866 – chocolate idia moth, rotund idia moth
- Idia scobialis Grote, 1880 – smoky idia moth
- Idia suffusalis J. B. Smith, 1899
- Idia terrebralis Barnes & McDunnough, 1912

== Unpublished species ==
- Idia concisa Forbes, 1954 or Idia sp. nr. aemula – pale-winged idia moth
