= Idia gopheri =

Scientific classification
- Kingdom: Animalia
- Phylum: Arthropoda
- Clade: Pancrustacea
- Class: Insecta
- Order: Lepidoptera
- Superfamily: Noctuoidea
- Family: Erebidae
- Genus: Idia
- Species: I. gopheri

Binomial name
- Idia gopheri (J. B. Smith, 1899)

Species of moth

Idia gopheri, the tortoise commensal noctuid moth, is a litter moth in the family Erebidae. The species was first described by J. B. Smith in 1899.

== Distribution ==
Idea gopher has only been recorded in Florida—from Lake Worth north to Escambia and Liberty counties, but it might also be present in southeastern Alabama and southern Georgia.

== Behavior ==
The moth's larvae live and feed in gopher tortoise burrows.
