= Idia laurentii =

Scientific classification
- Kingdom: Animalia
- Phylum: Arthropoda
- Clade: Pancrustacea
- Class: Insecta
- Order: Lepidoptera
- Superfamily: Noctuoidea
- Family: Erebidae
- Genus: Idia
- Species: I. laurentii

Binomial name
- Idia laurentii (J. B. Smith, 1893)

Species of moth

Idia laurentii, the laurentine idia, is a litter moth of the family Erebidae. The species was first described by J. B. Smith in 1893. It is found in the US from central New York, south to the mountains of North Carolina.

There is one generation per year.

Larvae have been reared on dead leaves of cherry.
