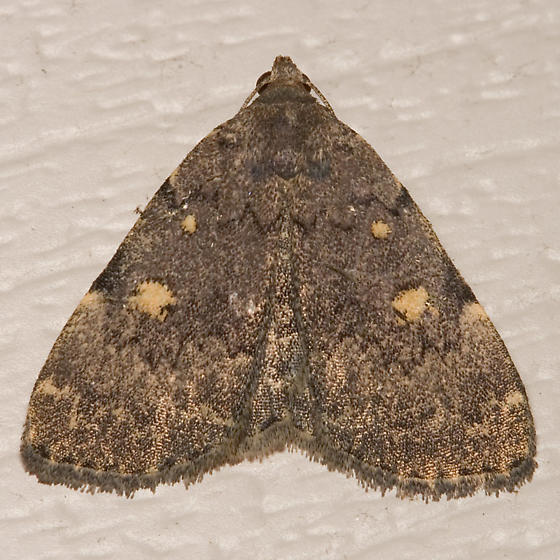

Scientific classification
- Kingdom: Animalia
- Phylum: Arthropoda
- Clade: Pancrustacea
- Class: Insecta
- Order: Lepidoptera
- Superfamily: Noctuoidea
- Family: Erebidae
- Genus: Idia
- Species: I. aemula

Binomial name
- Idia aemula Hübner, 1813

Synonyms
- Idia aemulalis Hübner, 1821; Idia undulalis (Stephens, 1834); Idia mollifera (Walker, 1858); Idia herminioides (Walker, 1860); Idia concisa (Walker, 1860)

= Idia aemula =

Species of moth

Idia aemula, the common idia, powdered snout or waved tabby, is a litter moth of the family Erebidae. The species was first described by Jacob Hübner in 1813. It is found from Canada south to Florida and Texas. It has been reported in the Palearctic.

The ground colour of both wings is medium grey. The basal, antemedial, postmedial lines are darker and thin. There is a more diffuse median line and sometimes a median shade. A pale subterminal line is preceded by a dark shade. The reniform spot is large and pale or warm ochre to orange brown. The hindwing has several wavy light and dark lines and a dark discal spot. The wingspan is 20–30 mm. In North America, adults are on wing from May to October in the north and from April to November in the south. There are two to three generations per year.

The larvae feed on dead leaves.
