= List of moths of Australia (Elachistidae) =

Partial list of Australian moths

This is a list of the Australian moth species of the family Elachistidae. It also acts as an index to the species articles and forms part of the full List of moths of Australia.

- Genus Elachista
  - Subgenus Atachia Wocke, 1876
    - erebophthalma group
      - Elachista erebophthalma Meyrick, 1897
      - Elachista evexa Kaila, 2011
      - Elachista rhomboidea Kaila, 2011
      - Elachista leucastra (Meyrick, 1906)
    - gerasmia group, catarata section
      - Elachista menura Kaila, 2011
      - Elachista flammula Kaila, 2011
      - Elachista crocospila Kaila, 2011
      - Elachista glomerella Kaila, 2011
      - Elachista sphaerella Kaila, 2011
      - Elachista aluta Kaila, 2011
      - Elachista sp. nr. sphaerella A (south-eastern Queensland)
      - Elachista sp. nr. sphaerella B (south-eastern Queensland)
      - Elachista sp. nr. sphaerella C (northern Queensland)
      - Elachista sp. nr. sphaerella D (northern Queensland)
      - Elachista sapphirella Kaila, 2011
      - Elachista patersoniae Kaila, 2011
      - Elachista catarata Meyrick, 1897
      - Elachista mutarata Kaila, 2011
      - Elachista laterina Kaila, 2011
      - Elachista ictera Kaila, 2011
      - Elachista asperae Kaila, 2011
      - Elachista ophthalma Kaila, 2011
      - Elachista coalita Kaila, 2011
      - Elachista corneola Kaila, 2011
    - gerasmia group, gerasmia section
      - Elachista magidina Kaila, 2011
      - Elachista floccella Kaila, 2011
      - Elachista velutina Kaila, 2011
      - Elachista carcharota Kaila, 2011
      - Elachista crenatella Kaila, 2011
      - Elachista bidens Kaila, 2011
      - Elachista alampeta Kaila, 2011
      - Elachista cursa Kaila, 2011
      - Elachista eriodes Kaila, 2011
      - Elachista illota Kaila, 2011
      - Elachista ceratiola Kaila, 2011
      - Elachista bilobella Kaila, 2011
      - Elachista filiphila Kaila, 2011
      - Elachista merista Kaila, 2011
      - Elachista lopadina Kaila, 2011
      - Elachista patania Kaila, 2011
      - Elachista indigens Kaila, 2011
      - Elachista sp. nr. indigens (Barren Grounds, New South Wales)
      - Elachista averta Kaila, 2011
      - Elachista anolba Kaila, 2011
      - Elachista flavicilia Kaila, 2011
      - Elachista tetraquetri Kaila, 2011
      - Elachista effusi Kaila, 2011
      - Elachista deusta Kaila, 2011
      - Elachista rubiginosae Kaila, 2011
      - Elachista ophelma Kaila, 2011
      - Elachista catagma Kaila, 2011
      - Elachista ruscella Kaila, 2011
      - Elachista sarota Kaila, 2011
      - Elachista syntomella Kaila, 2011
      - Elachista scopulina Kaila, 2011
      - Elachista nodosae Kaila, 2011
      - Elachista discina Kaila, 2011
      - Elachista melanthes (Meyrick, 1887)
      - Elachista platysma Kaila, 2011
      - Elachista stictifica Kaila, 2011
      - Elachista lachnella Kaila, 2011
      - Elachista sp. A in melanthes complex
    - gerasmia group, gerasmia section, Elachista gerasmia complex
      - Elachista gerasmia Meyrick, 1889 (Syn: Elachista egena Turner, 1923)
      - Elachista physalodes Kaila, 2011
      - Elachista peridiola Kaila, 2011
      - Elachista phascola Kaila, 2011
    - gerasmia group, gerasmia section, Elachista paragauda complex
      - Elachista paragauda Kaila, 2011
      - Elachista toralis Kaila, 2011
      - Elachista paryphoea Kaila, 2011
      - Elachista spathacea Kaila, 2011
      - Elachista cylistica Kaila, 2011
      - Elachista faberella Kaila, 2011
      - Elachista etorella Kaila, 2011
      - Elachista gladiograpta Kaila, 2011
      - Elachista gladiatrix Kaila, 2011
      - Elachista spongicola Kaila, 2011
    - gerasmia group, gerasmia section, Elachista cynopa complex
      - Elachista ligula Kaila, 2011
      - Elachista toryna Kaila, 2011
      - Elachista ascidiella Kaila, 2011
      - Elachista repanda Kaila, 2011
      - Elachista prolatella Kaila, 2011
      - Elachista protensa Kaila, 2011
      - Elachista campsella Kaila, 2011
      - Elachista spinodora Kaila, 2011
      - Elachista glossina Kaila, 2011
      - Elachista opima Kaila, 2011
      - Elachista pharetra Kaila, 2011
      - Elachista rudicula Kaila, 2011
      - Elachista corbicula Kaila, 2011
      - Elachista mystropa Kaila, 2011
      - Elachista trulla Kaila, 2011
      - Elachista euthema Kaila, 2011
      - Elachista cynopa Meyrick, 1897
      - Elachista epartica Kaila, 2011
      - Elachista zeta Kaila, 2011
      - Elachista chilotera Kaila, 2011
      - Elachista mundula Kaila, 2011
      - Elachista listrionea Kaila, 2011
      - Elachista crumilla Kaila, 2011
      - Elachista aposematica Kaila, 2011
      - Elachista chloropepla Meyrick, 1897
  - Subgenus Elachista
    - Elachista tetragonella group
      - Elachista ensifera Kaila, 2011
    - Elachista bifascialla group s.l.
      - Elachista platina Kaila, 2011
      - Elachista sp. nr. platina (Corrigin, Western Australia)
      - Elachista sp. bifascialla group (Mount Barrow, Tasmania)
      - Elachista micalis Kaila, 2011
      - Elachista habrella Kaila, 2011
      - Elachista scitula Kaila, 2011
    - Elachista orba group
      - Elachista cyanea Kaila, 2011
      - Elachista polliae Kaila, 2011
      - Elachista commoncommelinae Sugisima & Kaira, 2011
      - Elachista nielsencommelinae Sugisima & Kaira, 2011
    - Elachista praelineata group
      - Elachista aurita Kaila, 2011
    - Elachista solena group
      - Elachista ignicolor Kaila, 2011
    - Elachista freyerella group s.l.
      - Elachista synethes complex
        - Elachista fucosa Meyrick, 1922
        - Elachista seductilis Kaila, 2011
        - Elachista synethes Meyrick, 1897 (Syn: Elachista aphanta Turner, 1923, Elachista scrythrodes (Turner, 1947))
        - Elachista strenua Kaila, 2011
        - Elachista sandaraca Kaila, 2011
        - Elachista helvola Kaila, 2011
        - Elachista delira Kaila, 2011
        - Elachista sp. in synethes complex
      - Elachista freyerella complex
        - Elachista propera Kaila, 2011
        - Elachista dieropa Kaila, 2011
        - Elachista elaphria Kaila, 2011
        - Elachista cycotis Meyrick, 1897
        - Elachista vitellina Kaila, 2011
        - Elachista citrina Kaila, 2011
        - Elachista cerebrosella Kaila, 2011
        - Elachista melina Kaila, 2011
        - Elachista gemadella Kaila, 2011
        - Elachista ravella Kaila, 2011
        - Elachista cerina Kaila, 2011
        - Elachista diligens Kaila, 2011
        - Elachista aepsera Kaila, 2011
        - Elachista zophosema (Turner, 1947)
        - Elachista litharga Kaila, 2011
        - Elachista levipes Kaila, 2011
        - Elachista cerrita Kaila, 2011
        - Elachista velox Kaila, 2011
        - Elachista impiger Kaila, 2011
        - Elachista alacera Kaila, 2011
        - Elachista essymena Kaila, 2011
        - Elachista festina Kaila, 2011
- Genus Urodeta
  - Urodeta inusta Kaila, 2011
- Genus Perittia
  - Perittia daleris Kaila, 2011
  - Perittia antauges Kaila, 2011
  - Perittia deroga Kaila, 2011
