= Elachista cicadella =

Scientific classification
- Kingdom: Animalia
- Phylum: Arthropoda
- Clade: Pancrustacea
- Class: Insecta
- Order: Lepidoptera
- Family: Elachistidae
- Genus: Elachista
- Species: E. cicadella

Binomial name
- Elachista cicadella Kaila, 1999

Species of moth

Elachista cicadella is a moth of the family Elachistidae. It is found in Canada, where it has been recorded from Yukon.
