= Elachista jubarella =

Scientific classification
- Kingdom: Animalia
- Phylum: Arthropoda
- Class: Insecta
- Order: Lepidoptera
- Family: Elachistidae
- Genus: Elachista
- Species: E. jubarella

Binomial name
- Elachista jubarella Kaila, 2011

Species of moth

Elachista jubarella is a moth species in the family Elachistidae. It was described by Lauri Kaila in 2011. It is found in Russia, where it has been recorded from the western Caucasus. The habitat consists of alpine meadows.

The wingspan is about 12 mm.
