= Elachista granosa =

Scientific classification
- Domain: Eukaryota
- Kingdom: Animalia
- Phylum: Arthropoda
- Class: Insecta
- Order: Lepidoptera
- Family: Elachistidae
- Genus: Elachista
- Species: E. granosa

Binomial name
- Elachista granosa Kaila, 1997

Species of moth

Elachista granosa is a moth of the family Elachistidae that is found in Utah.

The length of the forewings is 4.9–5.9 millimetres (0.19–0.23 in).
