= Elachista elksourensis =

Scientific classification
- Kingdom: Animalia
- Phylum: Arthropoda
- Clade: Pancrustacea
- Class: Insecta
- Order: Lepidoptera
- Family: Elachistidae
- Genus: Elachista
- Species: E. elksourensis

Binomial name
- Elachista elksourensis Kaila, 2005

Species of moth

Elachista elksourensis is a moth of the family Elachistidae. It is found in the Atlas Mountains in Tunisia.

The length of the forewings is about 5 mm (0.20 in).
