= Elachista ischnella =

Scientific classification
- Domain: Eukaryota
- Kingdom: Animalia
- Phylum: Arthropoda
- Class: Insecta
- Order: Lepidoptera
- Family: Elachistidae
- Genus: Elachista
- Species: E. ischnella

Binomial name
- Elachista ischnella Kaila, 1997

Species of moth

Elachista ischnella is a moth of the family Elachistidae first described from Texas and also known from Arizona, Colorado, and New Mexico.

The length of the forewings is 3.7–4.2 millimetres (0.15–0.17 in).
