= Elachista enochra =

Scientific classification
- Kingdom: Animalia
- Phylum: Arthropoda
- Class: Insecta
- Order: Lepidoptera
- Family: Elachistidae
- Genus: Elachista
- Species: E. enochra

Binomial name
- Elachista enochra Kaila, 2011

Species of moth

Elachista enochra is a moth species in the family Elachistidae. It was described by Lauri Kaila in 2011. It is found in Turkmenistan.

The wingspan is 12.5–13 mm.
