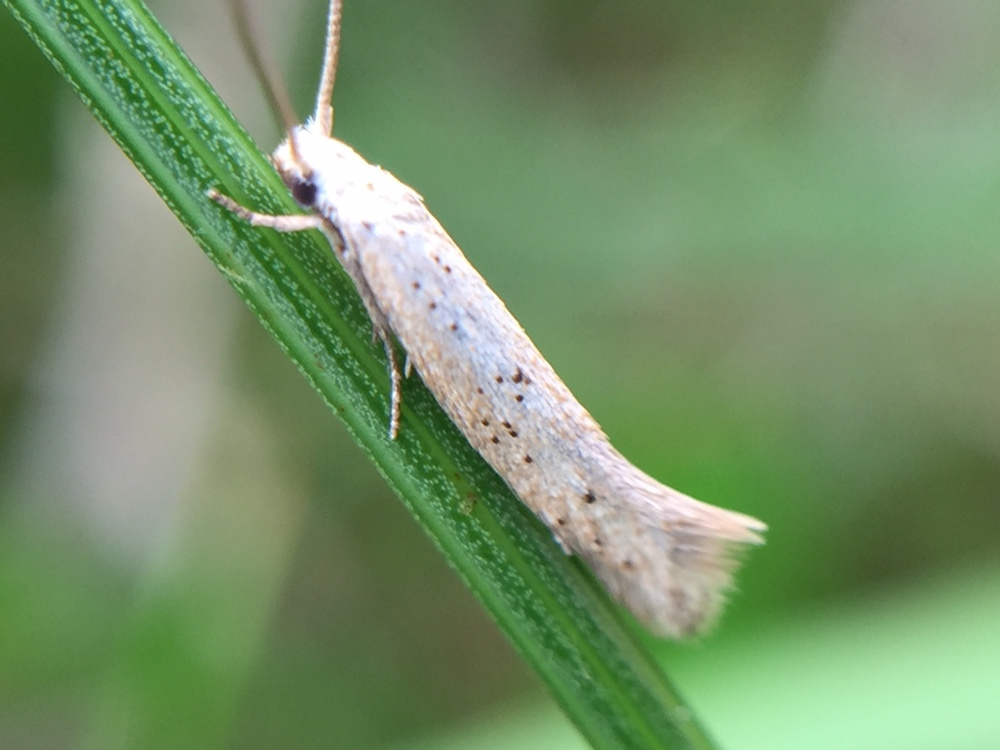

Scientific classification
- Domain: Eukaryota
- Kingdom: Animalia
- Phylum: Arthropoda
- Class: Insecta
- Order: Lepidoptera
- Family: Elachistidae
- Genus: Elachista
- Species: E. gerasmia

Binomial name
- Elachista gerasmia Meyrick, 1889

Synonyms
- Elachista egena Turner, 1923

= Elachista gerasmia =

Species of moth

Elachista gerasmia is a species of moth of the family Elachistidae that is found in New Zealand and south eastern Australia.

== Taxonomy ==
This species was first described by Edward Meyrick in 1889 from specimens collected in Hamilton, Makatoku in Hawkes Bay and in Invercargill. The male lectotype, collected in Hamilton, is held at the Natural History Museum, London.

== Description ==
The wingspan is 9–14 mm. The forewings are light grey or sometimes grey-whitish. There is a black dot on the fold in the middle, and an elongate black dot in the disc at two-thirds. The hindwings are grey.

== Distribution ==
This species is found in both the North and South Islands of New Zealand as well as in Queensland, New South Wales, South Australia and Tasmania.

== Hosts and habitat ==
Elachista gerasmia inhabits damp swampy habitat. The larvae of this species are leaf miners. Larval hosts include plant species in the genus Juncus including Juncus australis, Juncus pallidus and Juncus usitatus.
