= Elachista perniva =

Scientific classification
- Domain: Eukaryota
- Kingdom: Animalia
- Phylum: Arthropoda
- Class: Insecta
- Order: Lepidoptera
- Family: Elachistidae
- Genus: Elachista
- Species: E. perniva

Binomial name
- Elachista perniva Kaila, 1997

Species of moth

Elachista perniva is a moth of the family Elachistidae. It was first described from Wyoming and is also known from Saskatchewan and Colorado (Canada and the United States).

The length of the forewings is 4.8–5.5 millimetres (0.19–0.22 in).

== Etymology ==
The species name is derived from Latin per- and niveus (meaning very snowy).
