= Elachista beriga =

Scientific classification
- Kingdom: Animalia
- Phylum: Arthropoda
- Class: Insecta
- Order: Lepidoptera
- Family: Elachistidae
- Genus: Elachista
- Species: E. beriga

Binomial name
- Elachista beriga Kaila, 2000

Species of moth

Elachista beriga is a moth in the family Elachistidae. It was described by Lauri Kaila in 2000.
