= Elachista arena =

Scientific classification
- Domain: Eukaryota
- Kingdom: Animalia
- Phylum: Arthropoda
- Class: Insecta
- Order: Lepidoptera
- Family: Elachistidae
- Genus: Elachista
- Species: E. arena

Binomial name
- Elachista arena Kaila, 1997

Species of moth

Elachista arena is a moth of the family Elachistidae that is endemic to Nevada.

The length of the forewings is 5.6 millimetres (0.22 in).

== Etymology ==
The species name is derived from Latin arena (meaning sand).
