= Elachista beothucella =

Scientific classification
- Kingdom: Animalia
- Phylum: Arthropoda
- Class: Insecta
- Order: Lepidoptera
- Family: Elachistidae
- Genus: Elachista
- Species: E. beothucella

Binomial name
- Elachista beothucella Kaila, 1996

Species of moth

Elachista beothucella is a moth of the family Elachistidae. It is found in Canada, where it has been recorded from Nova Scotia.
