= Elachista nubila =

Scientific classification
- Domain: Eukaryota
- Kingdom: Animalia
- Phylum: Arthropoda
- Class: Insecta
- Order: Lepidoptera
- Family: Elachistidae
- Genus: Elachista
- Species: E. nubila

Binomial name
- Elachista nubila Kaila, 1997

Species of moth

Elachista nubila is a moth of the family Elachistidae that is endemic to Arizona.

The length of the forewings is 4–4.9 millimetres (0.16–0.19 in).
