= Elachista seductilis =

Scientific classification
- Domain: Eukaryota
- Kingdom: Animalia
- Phylum: Arthropoda
- Class: Insecta
- Order: Lepidoptera
- Family: Elachistidae
- Genus: Elachista
- Species: E. seductilis

Binomial name
- Elachista seductilis Kaila, 2011

Species of moth

Elachista seductilis is a moth of the family Elachistidae that is endemic to New South Wales.

The wingspan is 7.5–8.1 millimetres (0.30–0.32 in) for males and 8–9.5 millimetres (0.31–0.37 in) for females.

The larvae feed on Carex appressa and Cyperus exaltatus. They mine the leaves of their host plant.
