= Elachista crocospila =

Scientific classification
- Domain: Eukaryota
- Kingdom: Animalia
- Phylum: Arthropoda
- Class: Insecta
- Order: Lepidoptera
- Family: Elachistidae
- Genus: Elachista
- Species: E. crocospila

Binomial name
- Elachista crocospila Kaila, 2011

Species of moth

Elachista crocospila is a moth of the family Elachistidae. It is found in Australia in south-eastern New South Wales.

The wingspan is 6.6–6.9 mm for males and 7.1–7.8 mm for females.

The larvae feed on Carex brunnea. They mine the leaves of their host plant.
