= Elachista apina =

Scientific classification
- Kingdom: Animalia
- Phylum: Arthropoda
- Class: Insecta
- Order: Lepidoptera
- Family: Elachistidae
- Genus: Elachista
- Species: E. apina

Binomial name
- Elachista apina Kaila, 1997

Species of moth

Elachista apina is a moth of the family Elachistidae. It is found in North America in British Columbia, Oregon and Washington.

The length of the forewings is 4.8–5.7 millimetres (0.19–0.22 in).

== Etymology ==
The species name is derived from Greek apines ('clean').
