= Elachista flammula =

Scientific classification
- Kingdom: Animalia
- Phylum: Arthropoda
- Clade: Pancrustacea
- Class: Insecta
- Order: Lepidoptera
- Family: Elachistidae
- Genus: Elachista
- Species: E. flammula

Binomial name
- Elachista flammula Kaila, 2011

Species of moth

Elachista flammula is a moth of the family Elachistidae that is endemic to the Australian Capital Territory.

The wingspan is 9–10.3 millimetres (0.35–0.41 in) for males and 6.9–9.3 millimetres (0.27–0.37 in) for females.

The larvae feed on Carex polyantha. They mine the leaves of their host plant.
