= Elachista mutarata =

Scientific classification
- Kingdom: Animalia
- Phylum: Arthropoda
- Clade: Pancrustacea
- Class: Insecta
- Order: Lepidoptera
- Family: Elachistidae
- Genus: Elachista
- Species: E. mutarata

Binomial name
- Elachista mutarata Kaila, 2011

Species of moth

Elachista mutarata is a moth of the family Elachistidae. It is found in the Australian Capital Territory.

The wingspan is 7.6–9.8 millimetres (0.30–0.39 in) for males and 8.2–8.8 millimetres (0.32–0.35 in) for females.

The larvae feed on Carex appressa. They mine the leaves of their host plant.
