= Elachista dissona =

Scientific classification
- Domain: Eukaryota
- Kingdom: Animalia
- Phylum: Arthropoda
- Class: Insecta
- Order: Lepidoptera
- Family: Elachistidae
- Genus: Elachista
- Species: E. dissona

Binomial name
- Elachista dissona Kaila, 1997

Species of moth

Elachista dissona is a moth of the family Elachistidae that is found in Colorado.

The length of the forewings is 5.3–6.9 millimetres (0.21–0.27 in).

== Etymology ==
The species name is derived from Latin dissonus (meaning discordant or different).
