= Elachista cycotis =

Scientific classification
- Kingdom: Animalia
- Phylum: Arthropoda
- Class: Insecta
- Order: Lepidoptera
- Family: Elachistidae
- Genus: Elachista
- Species: E. cycotis

Binomial name
- Elachista cycotis Kaila, 2011

Species of moth

Elachista cycotis is a moth of the family Elachistidae. It is found in Australia.
