= Elachista epartica =

Scientific classification
- Kingdom: Animalia
- Phylum: Arthropoda
- Class: Insecta
- Order: Lepidoptera
- Family: Elachistidae
- Genus: Elachista
- Species: E. epartica

Binomial name
- Elachista epartica Kaila, 2011

Species of moth

Elachista epartica is a moth of the family Elachistidae. It is found in Australia.

The wingspan is 10.6-10.8 mm for females. The forewings are pale bluish grey.
