= Elachista essymena =

Scientific classification
- Kingdom: Animalia
- Phylum: Arthropoda
- Class: Insecta
- Order: Lepidoptera
- Family: Elachistidae
- Genus: Elachista
- Species: E. essymena

Binomial name
- Elachista essymena Kaila, 2011

Species of moth

Elachista essymena is a moth of the family Elachistidae. It is found in Australia, where it has been recorded from Tasmania.
