= Elachista euthema =

Scientific classification
- Kingdom: Animalia
- Phylum: Arthropoda
- Clade: Pancrustacea
- Class: Insecta
- Order: Lepidoptera
- Family: Elachistidae
- Genus: Elachista
- Species: E. euthema

Binomial name
- Elachista euthema Kaila, 2011

Species of moth

Elachista euthema is a moth of the family Elachistidae that is endemic to Australia.
