= Elachista evexa =

Scientific classification
- Domain: Eukaryota
- Kingdom: Animalia
- Phylum: Arthropoda
- Class: Insecta
- Order: Lepidoptera
- Family: Elachistidae
- Genus: Elachista
- Species: E. evexa

Binomial name
- Elachista evexa Kaila, 2011

Species of moth

Elachista evexa is a moth of the family Elachistidae. It is found in New South Wales, Australia.

The wingspan is about 12 mm for males and 11.4–12 mm for females.
