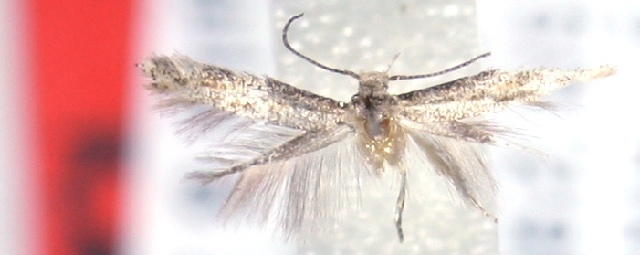

Scientific classification
- Kingdom: Animalia
- Phylum: Arthropoda
- Class: Insecta
- Order: Lepidoptera
- Family: Elachistidae
- Genus: Elachista
- Species: E. litharga

Binomial name
- Elachista litharga Kaila, 2011

= Elachista litharga =

Species of moth

Elachista litharga is a moth of the family Elachistidae. It is found in Australia, where it has been recorded from lowland areas in Tasmania.
