= Elachista aurita =

Scientific classification
- Domain: Eukaryota
- Kingdom: Animalia
- Phylum: Arthropoda
- Class: Insecta
- Order: Lepidoptera
- Family: Elachistidae
- Genus: Elachista
- Species: E. aurita

Binomial name
- Elachista aurita Kaila, 2011

Species of moth

Elachista aurita is a moth of the family Elachistidae. It is found in the southern parts of the eastern coast of Queensland.

The wingspan is 6–6.2 millimetres (0.24–0.24 in) for males and 5.8–6.4 millimetres (0.23–0.25 in) for females.

The larvae feed on Oplismenus species. They mine the leaves of their host plant. Pupation takes place outside of the mine on a leaf of the host plant.
