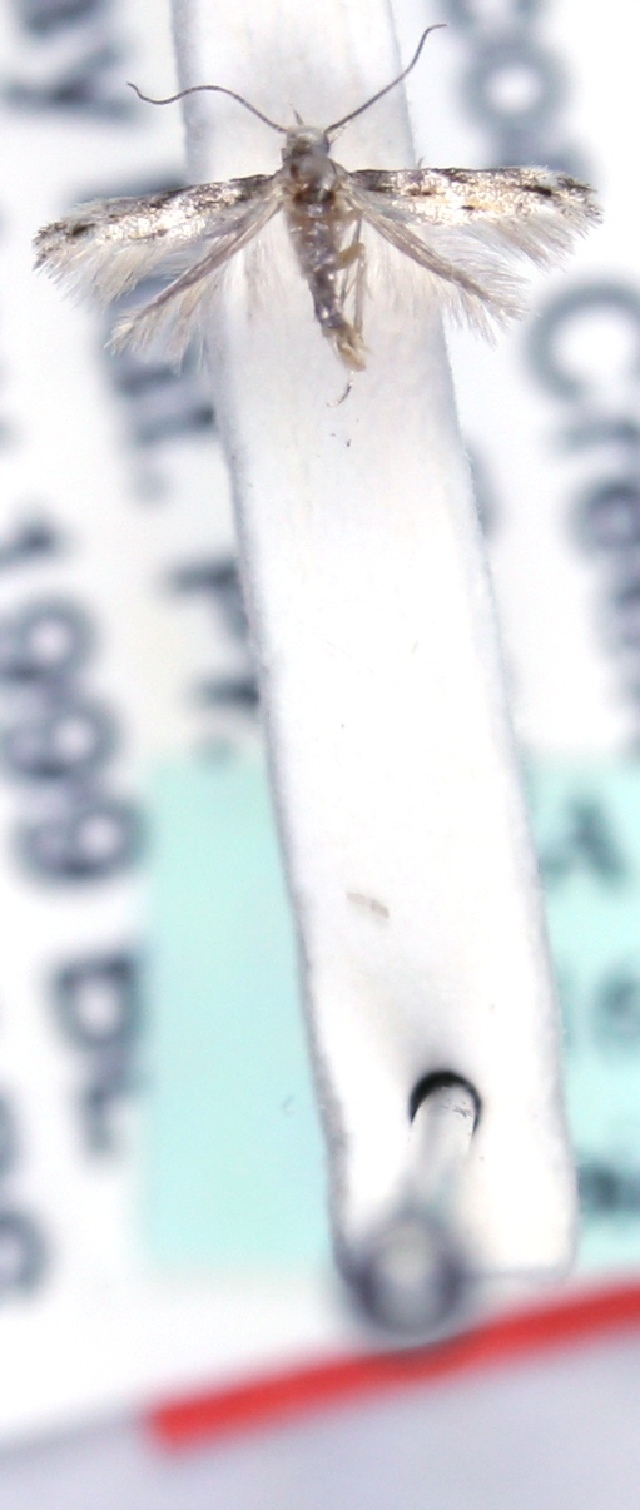

Scientific classification
- Kingdom: Animalia
- Phylum: Arthropoda
- Class: Insecta
- Order: Lepidoptera
- Family: Elachistidae
- Genus: Elachista
- Species: E. aepsera

Binomial name
- Elachista aepsera Kaila, 2011

= Elachista aepsera =

Species of moth

Elachista aepsera is a moth of the family Elachistidae. It is found in Australia, where it has been recorded from Queensland.

The wingspan is 5.6–6 mm for males and about 6 mm for females. The ground colour of the forewings is grey basally, with dark grey-tipped scales. The hindwings are grey.
