= Elachista laterina =

Scientific classification
- Kingdom: Animalia
- Phylum: Arthropoda
- Clade: Pancrustacea
- Class: Insecta
- Order: Lepidoptera
- Family: Elachistidae
- Genus: Elachista
- Species: E. laterina

Binomial name
- Elachista laterina Kaila, 2011

Species of moth

Elachista laterina is a moth of the family Elachistidae. It is found in north-eastern Queensland.

The wingspan is 7.5–8.7 millimetres (0.30–0.34 in) for males. The forewings are brown while it hindwings are grey.
