= Elachista platysma =

Scientific classification
- Kingdom: Animalia
- Phylum: Arthropoda
- Class: Insecta
- Order: Lepidoptera
- Family: Elachistidae
- Genus: Elachista
- Species: E. platysma

Binomial name
- Elachista platysma Kaila, 2011

Species of moth

Elachista platysma is a moth of the family Elachistidae. It is found in Australia.

The wingspan is 7.3–9 mm for males and 7.9–8.7 mm for females. The forewings are bluish grey and the hindwings are grey.
