= Elachista velutina =

Scientific classification
- Kingdom: Animalia
- Phylum: Arthropoda
- Clade: Pancrustacea
- Class: Insecta
- Order: Lepidoptera
- Family: Elachistidae
- Genus: Elachista
- Species: E. velutina

Binomial name
- Elachista velutina Kaila, 2011

Species of moth

Elachista velutina is a moth of the family Elachistidae that is found on the Fleurieu Peninsula in South Australia.

The wingspan is 10.4–14 millimetres (0.41–0.55 in) for males and 11.2–13 millimetres (0.44–0.51 in) for females. The forewings are pale grey while the hindwings are grey.

The larvae feed on Lepidosperma longitudinale and possibly Lepidosperma limicola. They mine the leaves of their host plant.
