= Elachista patersoniae =

Scientific classification
- Kingdom: Animalia
- Phylum: Arthropoda
- Class: Insecta
- Order: Lepidoptera
- Family: Elachistidae
- Genus: Elachista
- Species: E. patersoniae

Binomial name
- Elachista patersoniae Kaila, 2011

Species of moth

Elachista patersoniae is a moth of the family Elachistidae. It is found in south-eastern New South Wales, Australia.

The wingspan is 6.7–7.5 mm (0.26–0.30 in) for males and 6.8–8.2 mm (0.27–0.32 in)for females.

The larvae feed on Patersonia sericea and Patersonia longifolia. They mine the leaves of their host plant.
