= Elachista cyanea =

Scientific classification
- Domain: Eukaryota
- Kingdom: Animalia
- Phylum: Arthropoda
- Class: Insecta
- Order: Lepidoptera
- Family: Elachistidae
- Genus: Elachista
- Species: E. cyanea

Binomial name
- Elachista cyanea Kaila, 2011

Species of moth

Elachista cyanea is a moth of the family Elachistidae. It is found in Australia along the eastern coast form southern Queensland to Burrewarra Point in New South Wales.

The wingspan is 5.2–5.8 mm for males and 5.2–6.4 mm for females.

The larvae feed on Commelina cyanea. They mine the leaves of their host plant.
