= Elachista commoncommelinae =

Scientific classification
- Domain: Eukaryota
- Kingdom: Animalia
- Phylum: Arthropoda
- Class: Insecta
- Order: Lepidoptera
- Family: Elachistidae
- Genus: Elachista
- Species: E. commoncommelinae

Binomial name
- Elachista commoncommelinae Sugisima & Kaila, 2011

Species of moth

Elachista commoncommelinae is a moth of the family Elachistidae. It is found along the coast of tropical Queensland.

The wingspan is 6–6.4 millimetres (0.24–0.25 in) for males and 6.2–6.8 millimetres (0.24–0.27 in) for females. The forewings are black with a bronzy sheen. The hindwings are dark grey.

The larvae feed on Commelina species. They mine the leaves of their host plant.
