= Elachista eriodes =

Scientific classification
- Domain: Eukaryota
- Kingdom: Animalia
- Phylum: Arthropoda
- Class: Insecta
- Order: Lepidoptera
- Family: Elachistidae
- Genus: Elachista
- Species: E. eriodes

Binomial name
- Elachista eriodes Kaila, 2011

Species of moth

Elachista eriodes is a moth of the family Elachistidae. It is found in the Australia state of New South Wales and on the Fleurieu Peninsula in South Australia.

The wingspan is about 12.4 mm for males and 12.2 mm for females.
