= Elachista ophthalma =

Scientific classification
- Kingdom: Animalia
- Phylum: Arthropoda
- Clade: Pancrustacea
- Class: Insecta
- Order: Lepidoptera
- Family: Elachistidae
- Genus: Elachista
- Species: E. ophthalma

Binomial name
- Elachista ophthalma Kaila, 2011

Species of moth

Elachista ophthalma is a moth of the family Elachistidae. It is found along the coast of south-eastern New South Wales.

The wingspan is 8.4–9.7 millimetres (0.33–0.38 in) for males and 7.8–9.8 millimetres (0.31–0.39 in) for females.
