= Elachista magidina =

Scientific classification
- Kingdom: Animalia
- Phylum: Arthropoda
- Clade: Pancrustacea
- Class: Insecta
- Order: Lepidoptera
- Family: Elachistidae
- Genus: Elachista
- Species: E. magidina

Binomial name
- Elachista magidina Kaila, 2011

Species of moth

Elachista magidina is a moth of the family Elachistidae that is found in the coastal forests of New South Wales and the Lamington National Park in southern Queensland.

The wingspan is 9.6–11.5 millimetres (0.38–0.45 in) for males and 9.2–11.4 millimetres (0.36–0.45 in) for females.
