= Elachista nielsencommelinae =

Scientific classification
- Kingdom: Animalia
- Phylum: Arthropoda
- Clade: Pancrustacea
- Class: Insecta
- Order: Lepidoptera
- Family: Elachistidae
- Genus: Elachista
- Species: E. nielsencommelinae

Binomial name
- Elachista nielsencommelinae Sugisima & Kaila, 2011

Species of moth

Elachista nielsencommelinae is a moth of the family Elachistidae. It is found along the northern coast and in the subcoastal areas of the Northern Territory.

The wingspan is 5–5.6 millimetres (0.20–0.22 in) for males and 5.2–6.2 millimetres (0.20–0.24 in) for females.

The larvae feed on Commelina species. They mine the leaves of their host plant.
