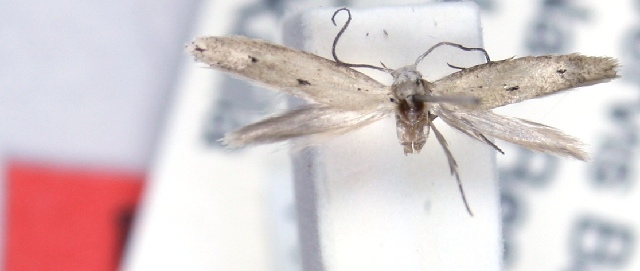

Scientific classification
- Kingdom: Animalia
- Phylum: Arthropoda
- Class: Insecta
- Order: Lepidoptera
- Family: Elachistidae
- Genus: Elachista
- Species: E. mystropa

Binomial name
- Elachista mystropa Kaila, 2011

= Elachista mystropa =

Species of moth

Elachista mystropa is a moth of the family Elachistidae. It is found in Australia.
