= Elachista citrina =

Scientific classification
- Kingdom: Animalia
- Phylum: Arthropoda
- Clade: Pancrustacea
- Class: Insecta
- Order: Lepidoptera
- Family: Elachistidae
- Genus: Elachista
- Species: E. citrina

Binomial name
- Elachista citrina Kaila, 2011

Species of moth

Elachista citrina is a moth of the family Elachistidae that is found in Australia.
