= Elachista lopadina =

Scientific classification
- Kingdom: Animalia
- Phylum: Arthropoda
- Class: Insecta
- Order: Lepidoptera
- Family: Elachistidae
- Genus: Elachista
- Species: E. lopadina

Binomial name
- Elachista lopadina Kaila, 2011

Species of moth

Elachista lopadina is a moth of the family Elachistidae. It is found in south-western Western Australia.

The wingspan is about 7 mm for males.
