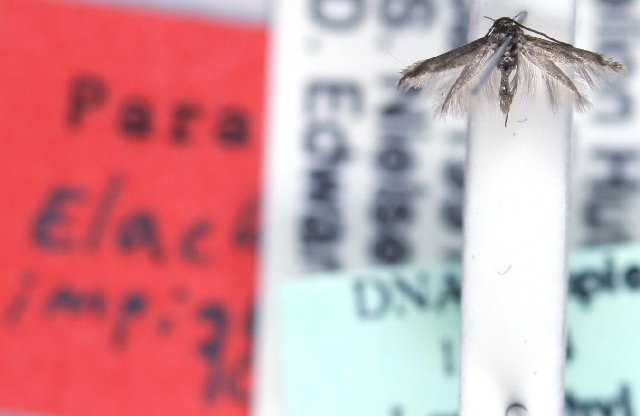

Scientific classification
- Kingdom: Animalia
- Phylum: Arthropoda
- Class: Insecta
- Order: Lepidoptera
- Family: Elachistidae
- Genus: Elachista
- Species: E. impiger

Binomial name
- Elachista impiger Kaila, 2011

= Elachista impiger =

Species of moth

Elachista impiger is a moth of the family Elachistidae. It is found in Australia.

The wingspan is 6–6.2 mm. The ground colour of the forewings is bluish grey, with dark grey-tipped scales. The hindwings are grey.
