= Elachista ascidiella =

Scientific classification
- Kingdom: Animalia
- Phylum: Arthropoda
- Class: Insecta
- Order: Lepidoptera
- Family: Elachistidae
- Genus: Elachista
- Species: E. ascidiella

Binomial name
- Elachista ascidiella Kaila, 2011

Species of moth

Elachista ascidiella is a moth of the family Elachistidae. It is found in Australia.
