= Elachista ictera =

Scientific classification
- Kingdom: Animalia
- Phylum: Arthropoda
- Class: Insecta
- Order: Lepidoptera
- Family: Elachistidae
- Genus: Elachista
- Species: E. ictera

Binomial name
- Elachista ictera Kaila, 2011

Species of moth

Elachista ictera is a moth of the family Elachistidae. It was described by Lauri Kaila in 2011. It is found in Australia in the Australian Capital Territory and south-eastern New South Wales.

The wingspan is 7.9–8.1 mm for males.
