= Elachista asperae =

Scientific classification
- Domain: Eukaryota
- Kingdom: Animalia
- Phylum: Arthropoda
- Class: Insecta
- Order: Lepidoptera
- Family: Elachistidae
- Genus: Elachista
- Species: E. asperae

Binomial name
- Elachista asperae Kaila, 2011

Species of moth

Elachista asperae is a moth of the family Elachistidae. It is found along the coast of New South Wales, Australia.

The wingspan is 8.8–9.2 mm for males and 10.3 mm for females.

The larvae feed on Gahnia aspera. They mine the leaves of their host plant.
