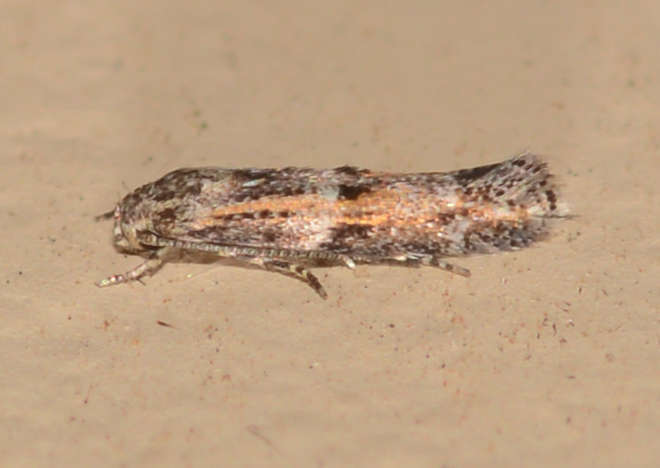

Scientific classification
- Kingdom: Animalia
- Phylum: Arthropoda
- Clade: Pancrustacea
- Class: Insecta
- Order: Lepidoptera
- Family: Elachistidae
- Genus: Elachista
- Species: E. delira

Binomial name
- Elachista delira Kaila, 2011

= Elachista delira =

Species of moth

Elachista delira is a species of moth in the family Elachistidae. It is found in Australia.
