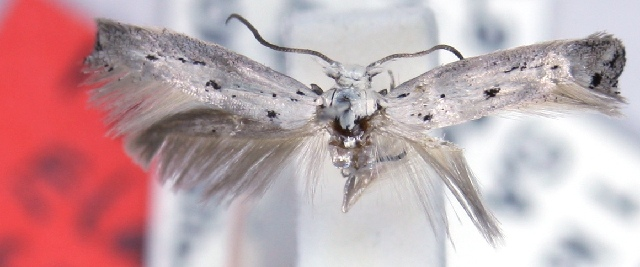

Scientific classification
- Kingdom: Animalia
- Phylum: Arthropoda
- Clade: Pancrustacea
- Class: Insecta
- Order: Lepidoptera
- Family: Elachistidae
- Genus: Elachista
- Species: E. carcharota

Binomial name
- Elachista carcharota Kaila, 2011

= Elachista carcharota =

Species of moth

Elachista carcharota is a moth of the family Elachistidae. It is found in Victoria, South Australia and Western Australia.

The wingspan is 11.6–12.9 millimetres (0.46–0.51 in) for males. The forewings are pale grey. The hindwings are grey.

The larvae feed on Lepidosperma concavum and possibly Lepidosperma congestum. They mine the leaves of their host plant. Pupation takes place outside of the mine on a leaf of the host plant.
