= Elachista bidens =

Scientific classification
- Kingdom: Animalia
- Phylum: Arthropoda
- Clade: Pancrustacea
- Class: Insecta
- Order: Lepidoptera
- Family: Elachistidae
- Genus: Elachista
- Species: E. bidens

Binomial name
- Elachista bidens Kaila, 2011

Species of moth

Elachista bidens is a moth of the family Elachistidae that is found in Western Australia.

The wingspan is about 10.6 millimetres (0.42 in) for males and 12.7 millimetres (0.50 in) for females.
