= Elachista micalis =

Scientific classification
- Domain: Eukaryota
- Kingdom: Animalia
- Phylum: Arthropoda
- Class: Insecta
- Order: Lepidoptera
- Family: Elachistidae
- Genus: Elachista
- Species: E. micalis

Binomial name
- Elachista micalis Kaila, 2011

Species of moth

Elachista micalis is a moth of the family Elachistidae. It is found from the Pelion Plains to the Pelion Gap area in Tasmania.

The wingspan is 5.8–6 millimetres (0.23–0.24 in) for males and 6.6 millimetres (0.26 in) for females.
