= Elachista sapphirella =

Scientific classification
- Domain: Eukaryota
- Kingdom: Animalia
- Phylum: Arthropoda
- Class: Insecta
- Order: Lepidoptera
- Family: Elachistidae
- Genus: Elachista
- Species: E. sapphirella

Binomial name
- Elachista sapphirella Kaila, 2011

Species of moth

Elachista sapphirella is a moth of the family Elachistidae. It is found in south-eastern New South Wales, the Australian Capital Territory and Victoria.

The wingspan is 4.7–6.2 millimetres (0.19–0.24 in) for males and 6.4 millimetres (0.25 in) for females.

Larvae have been reared from an unidentified Poaceae species.
