= Elachista ceratiola =

Scientific classification
- Domain: Eukaryota
- Kingdom: Animalia
- Phylum: Arthropoda
- Class: Insecta
- Order: Lepidoptera
- Family: Elachistidae
- Genus: Elachista
- Species: E. ceratiola

Binomial name
- Elachista ceratiola Kaila, 2011

Species of moth

Elachista ceratiola is a moth of the family Elachistidae. It is found on the Fleurieu Peninsula in South Australia.

The wingspan is 12.2 mm for males. The forewings are blue and the hindwings are grey.
