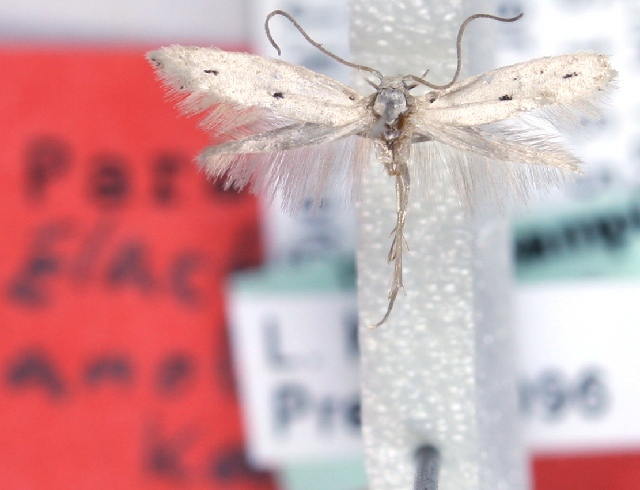

Scientific classification
- Domain: Eukaryota
- Kingdom: Animalia
- Phylum: Arthropoda
- Class: Insecta
- Order: Lepidoptera
- Family: Elachistidae
- Genus: Elachista
- Species: E. anolba

Binomial name
- Elachista anolba Kaila, 2011

= Elachista anolba =

Species of moth

Elachista anolba is a moth of the family Elachistidae. It is found in Australia in southern Tasmania.

The wingspan is 9.6–10.7 mm for males.
