= Elachista velox =

Scientific classification
- Kingdom: Animalia
- Phylum: Arthropoda
- Clade: Pancrustacea
- Class: Insecta
- Order: Lepidoptera
- Family: Elachistidae
- Genus: Elachista
- Species: E. velox

Binomial name
- Elachista velox Kaila, 2011

Species of moth

Elachista velox is a moth of the family Elachistidae that is found in Australia, where it has been recorded from New South Wales, the Australian Capital Territory and Tasmania. The habitat ranges from mallee to rainforests.
