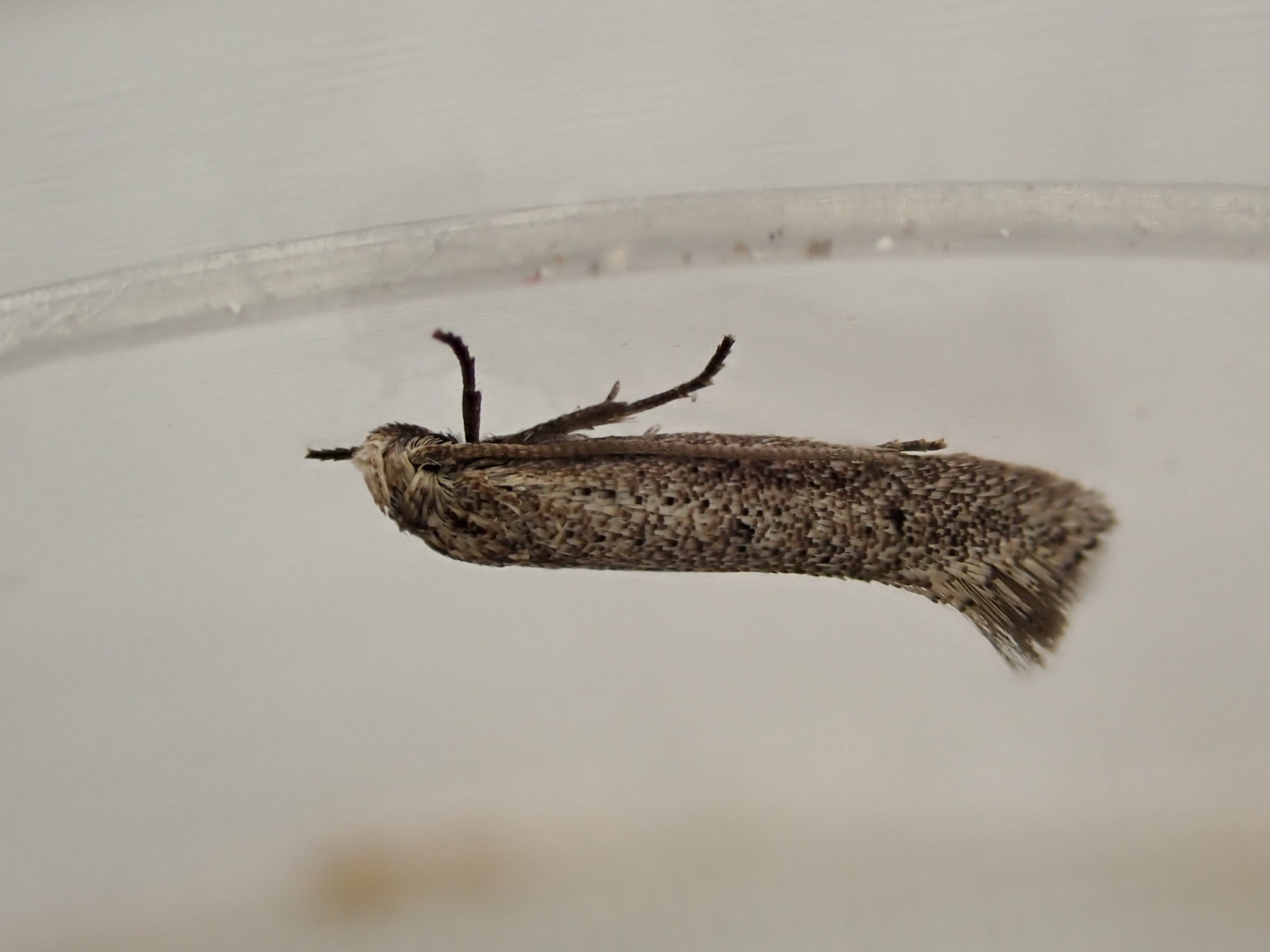

Scientific classification
- Domain: Eukaryota
- Kingdom: Animalia
- Phylum: Arthropoda
- Class: Insecta
- Order: Lepidoptera
- Family: Elachistidae
- Genus: Elachista
- Species: E. physalodes

Binomial name
- Elachista physalodes Kaila, 2011

= Elachista physalodes =

Species of moth

Elachista physalodes is a moth of the family Elachistidae. It is native to Australia but has also been found in New Zealand.

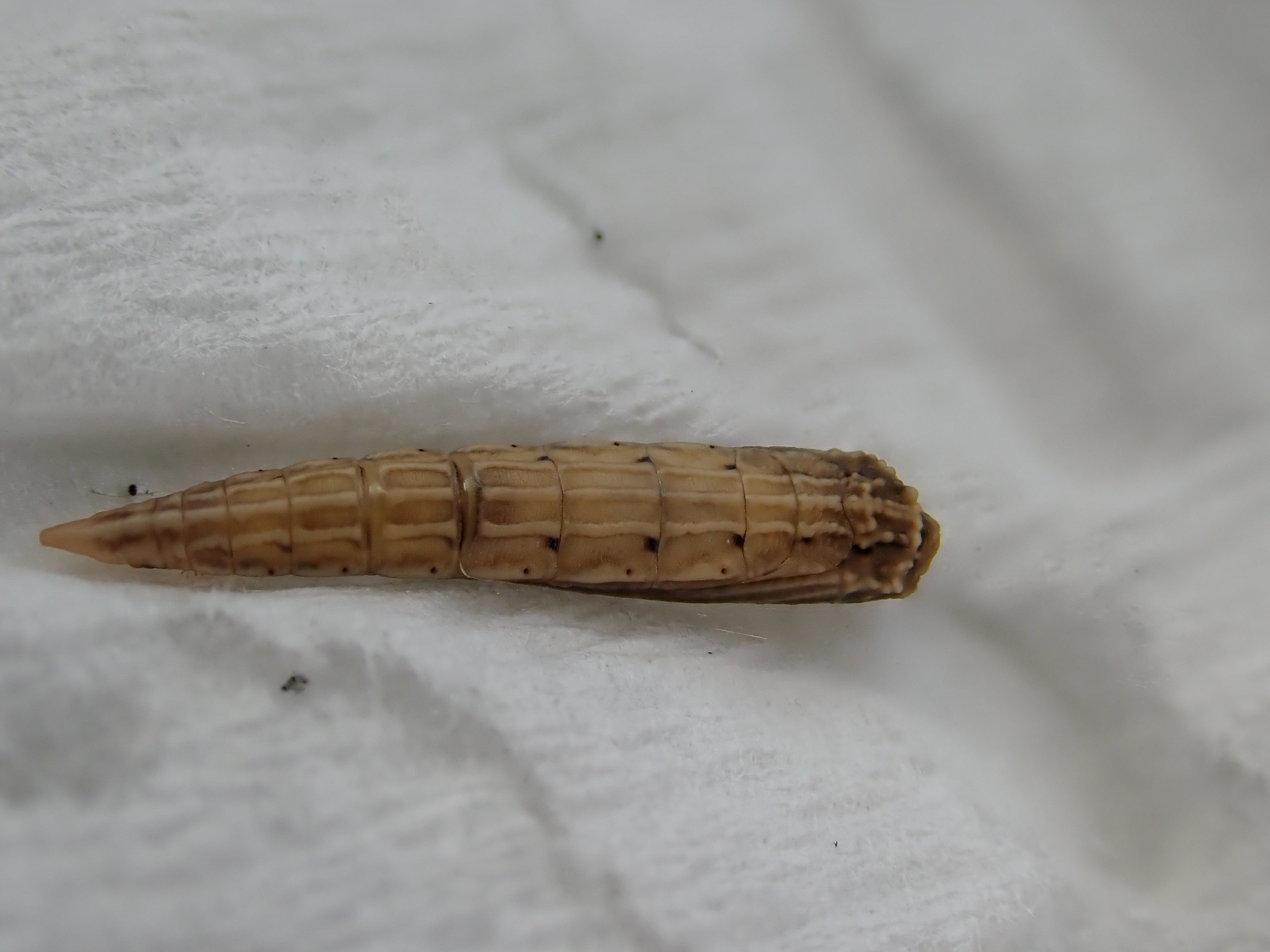
Elachista physalodes pupa

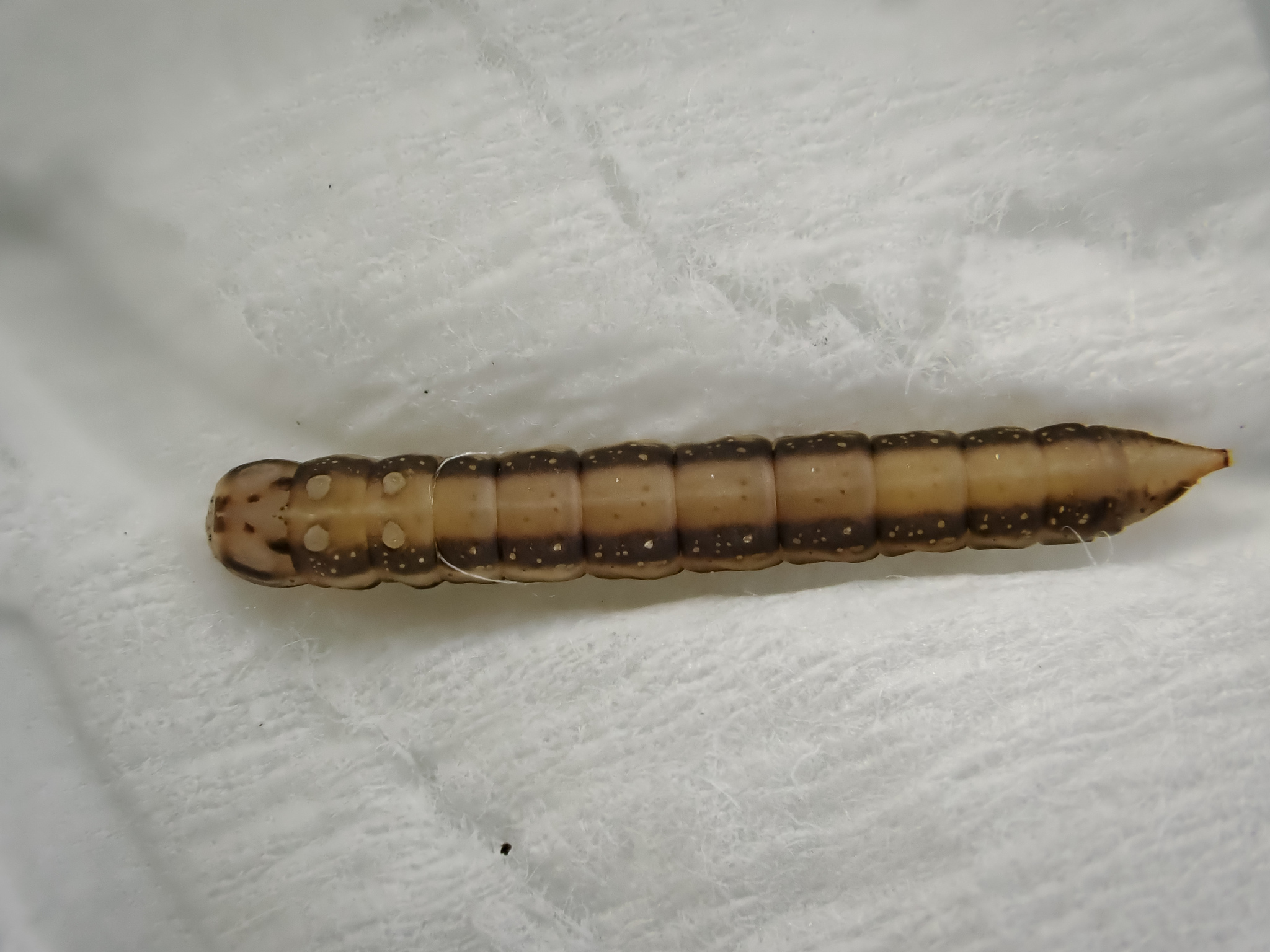
Elachista physalodes larva
