= Elachista mundula =

Scientific classification
- Kingdom: Animalia
- Phylum: Arthropoda
- Clade: Pancrustacea
- Class: Insecta
- Order: Lepidoptera
- Family: Elachistidae
- Genus: Elachista
- Species: E. mundula

Binomial name
- Elachista mundula Kaila, 2011

Species of moth

Elachista mundula is a moth of the family Elachistidae. It is found in South Australia, Victoria and Tasmania.

The wingspan is 10–11.4 millimetres (0.39–0.45 in) for males and 7.8–10.5 millimetres (0.31–0.41 in) for females.

The larvae feed on Gahnia sieberiana. They mine the leaves of their host plant.
