= Elachista crumilla =

Scientific classification
- Domain: Eukaryota
- Kingdom: Animalia
- Phylum: Arthropoda
- Class: Insecta
- Order: Lepidoptera
- Family: Elachistidae
- Genus: Elachista
- Species: E. crumilla

Binomial name
- Elachista crumilla Kaila, 2011

Species of moth

Elachista crumilla is a moth of the family Elachistidae. It is found in Australia.

The wingspan is 8–10.8 mm for males and 7.8–11.8 mm for females.
