= Elachista platina =

Scientific classification
- Kingdom: Animalia
- Phylum: Arthropoda
- Class: Insecta
- Order: Lepidoptera
- Family: Elachistidae
- Genus: Elachista
- Species: E. platina

Binomial name
- Elachista platina Kaila, 2011

Species of moth

Elachista platina is a moth of the family Elachistidae. It is found in the Australian Capital Territory.

The larvae feed on Joycea pallida. They mine the leaves of their host plant.
