= Elachista festina =

Scientific classification
- Kingdom: Animalia
- Phylum: Arthropoda
- Clade: Pancrustacea
- Class: Insecta
- Order: Lepidoptera
- Family: Elachistidae
- Genus: Elachista
- Species: E. festina

Binomial name
- Elachista festina Kaila, 2011

Species of moth

Elachista festina is a moth of the family Elachistidae that is endemic to Australia, where it has been recorded from southern Queensland to coastal New South Wales.

The wingspan is 6.1–7.6 millimetres (0.24–0.30 in). The ground colour of the forewings is pale grey, with brown-tipped scales. The hindwings are grey.
