= Elachista chilotera =

Scientific classification
- Domain: Eukaryota
- Kingdom: Animalia
- Phylum: Arthropoda
- Class: Insecta
- Order: Lepidoptera
- Family: Elachistidae
- Genus: Elachista
- Species: E. chilotera

Binomial name
- Elachista chilotera Kaila, 2011

Species of moth

Elachista chilotera is a moth of the family Elachistidae. It is found in Australia in south-western Western Australia.

Adults are ash grey.

The larvae feed on Lepidosperma tuberculatum. They mine the leaves of their host plant.
