= Elachista sphaerella =

Scientific classification
- Domain: Eukaryota
- Kingdom: Animalia
- Phylum: Arthropoda
- Class: Insecta
- Order: Lepidoptera
- Family: Elachistidae
- Genus: Elachista
- Species: E. sphaerella

Binomial name
- Elachista sphaerella Kaila, 2011

Species of moth

Elachista sphaerella is a moth of the family Elachistidae. It is found in the Northern Territory.

The wingspan is 5.5–6.6 millimetres (0.22–0.26 in) for males and 5.8–7.3 millimetres (0.23–0.29 in) for females.

The larvae have been reared on a Carex species.
