= Elachista illota =

Scientific classification
- Kingdom: Animalia
- Phylum: Arthropoda
- Class: Insecta
- Order: Lepidoptera
- Family: Elachistidae
- Genus: Elachista
- Species: E. illota

Binomial name
- Elachista illota Kaila, 2011

Species of moth

Elachista illota is a moth of the family Elachistidae. It is found in south-western Western Australia.

The wingspan is 9.4–11.2 mm for males.

The larvae feed on Lepidosperma species. They mine the leaves of their host plant.
