= Elachista averta =

Scientific classification
- Domain: Eukaryota
- Kingdom: Animalia
- Phylum: Arthropoda
- Class: Insecta
- Order: Lepidoptera
- Family: Elachistidae
- Genus: Elachista
- Species: E. averta

Binomial name
- Elachista averta Kaila, 2011

Species of moth

Elachista averta is a moth of the family Elachistidae. It is found in Australia in eastern New South Wales and Queensland.

The wingspan is 9.3–9.9 mm for males.
