= Elachista alampeta =

Scientific classification
- Domain: Eukaryota
- Kingdom: Animalia
- Phylum: Arthropoda
- Class: Insecta
- Order: Lepidoptera
- Family: Elachistidae
- Genus: Elachista
- Species: E. alampeta

Binomial name
- Elachista alampeta Kaila, 2011

Species of moth

Elachista alampeta is a moth of the family Elachistidae. It is found in Western Australia.

The wingspan is about 9.7 millimetres (0.38 in) for males.
