= Elachista rubiginosae =

Scientific classification
- Kingdom: Animalia
- Phylum: Arthropoda
- Clade: Pancrustacea
- Class: Insecta
- Order: Lepidoptera
- Family: Elachistidae
- Genus: Elachista
- Species: E. rubiginosae

Binomial name
- Elachista rubiginosae Kaila, 2011

Species of moth

Elachista rubiginosae is a moth of the family Elachistidae which is endemic to Australia.

Larval host plants: Baumea rubiginosa (Spreng.) Boeck. ( Cyperaceae )
