= Elachista indigens =

Scientific classification
- Kingdom: Animalia
- Phylum: Arthropoda
- Class: Insecta
- Order: Lepidoptera
- Family: Elachistidae
- Genus: Elachista
- Species: E. indigens

Binomial name
- Elachista indigens Kaila, 2011

Species of moth

Elachista indigens is a moth of the family Elachistidae. It is found in the Australian state of New South Wales.

The wingspan is 9.4–10 mm for males. The forewings and hindwings are pale grey.
