= Elachista vitellina =

Scientific classification
- Kingdom: Animalia
- Phylum: Arthropoda
- Class: Insecta
- Order: Lepidoptera
- Family: Elachistidae
- Genus: Elachista
- Species: E. vitellina

Binomial name
- Elachista vitellina Kaila, 2011

Species of moth

Elachista vitellina is a moth of the family Elachistidae. It is found all over Australia.
