= Elachista cerrita =

Scientific classification
- Kingdom: Animalia
- Phylum: Arthropoda
- Class: Insecta
- Order: Lepidoptera
- Family: Elachistidae
- Genus: Elachista
- Species: E. cerrita

Binomial name
- Elachista cerrita Kaila, 2011

Species of moth

Elachista cerrita is a moth of the family Elachistidae. It is found in Australia.

The wingspan is about 5.5 mm. The ground colour of the forewings is bluish white basally with grey and brown-tipped scales. The hindwings are dark grey.
