= Elachista catarata =

Scientific classification
- Kingdom: Animalia
- Phylum: Arthropoda
- Clade: Pancrustacea
- Class: Insecta
- Order: Lepidoptera
- Family: Elachistidae
- Genus: Elachista
- Species: E. catarata

Binomial name
- Elachista catarata Meyrick, 1897

Species of moth

Elachista catarata is a moth of the family Elachistidae that can be found in eastern New South Wales, the Australian Capital Territory and Tasmania.

The wingspan is 7.8–8.8 millimetres (0.31–0.35 in) for males and 7.8–9.5 millimetres (0.31–0.37 in) for females.

The larvae feed on Carex appressa and Carex longebrachiata. They mine the leaves of their host plant. The mine reaches a length of about 200 millimetres (7.9 in).
