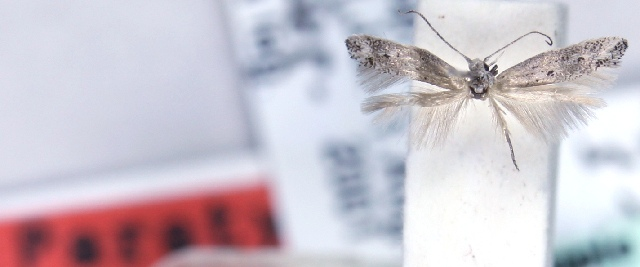

Scientific classification
- Kingdom: Animalia
- Phylum: Arthropoda
- Clade: Pancrustacea
- Class: Insecta
- Order: Lepidoptera
- Family: Elachistidae
- Genus: Elachista
- Species: E. filiphila

Binomial name
- Elachista filiphila Kaila, 2011

= Elachista filiphila =

Species of moth

Elachista filiphila is a moth of the family Elachistidae. It is found along the southern coast of Western Australia.

The wingspan is 8.8–9.2 millimetres (0.35–0.36 in) for males and 8.6 millimetres (0.34 in) for females.
