= Elachista levipes =

Scientific classification
- Kingdom: Animalia
- Phylum: Arthropoda
- Class: Insecta
- Order: Lepidoptera
- Family: Elachistidae
- Genus: Elachista
- Species: E. levipes

Binomial name
- Elachista levipes Kaila, 2011

Species of moth

Elachista levipes is a moth of the family Elachistidae. It is found in Australia, where it has been recorded from New South Wales. It is possibly also present in Tasmania.

The wingspan is 5.8–6.2 mm. The ground colour of the forewings is grey with dark grey-tipped scales. The hindwings are dark grey.
