= Elachista rhomboidea =

Scientific classification
- Kingdom: Animalia
- Phylum: Arthropoda
- Class: Insecta
- Order: Lepidoptera
- Family: Elachistidae
- Genus: Elachista
- Species: E. rhomboidea

Binomial name
- Elachista rhomboidea Kaila, 2011

Species of moth

Elachista rhomboidea is a moth of the family Elachistidae. It is found along the western coast of the Australian state of Western Australia.

The wingspan is about 11.3 mm.
