= Elachista ignicolor =

Scientific classification
- Kingdom: Animalia
- Phylum: Arthropoda
- Class: Insecta
- Order: Lepidoptera
- Family: Elachistidae
- Genus: Elachista
- Species: E. ignicolor

Binomial name
- Elachista ignicolor Kaila, 2011

Species of moth

Elachista ignicolor is a moth of the family Elachistidae. It is found in eastern Queensland and New South Wales, Australia.

The wingspan is 6–6.2 mm for males and 5.8–6.4 mm for females.

The larvae feed on Imperata cylindrica. They mine the leaves of their host plant.
