= Elachista patania =

Scientific classification
- Kingdom: Animalia
- Phylum: Arthropoda
- Class: Insecta
- Order: Lepidoptera
- Family: Elachistidae
- Genus: Elachista
- Species: E. patania

Binomial name
- Elachista patania Kaila, 2011

Species of moth

Elachista patania is a moth of the family Elachistidae. It is found in the coastal areas of south-western Western Australia.

The wingspan is 10.5–11.3 mm for males.
