= Elachista coalita =

Scientific classification
- Kingdom: Animalia
- Phylum: Arthropoda
- Class: Insecta
- Order: Lepidoptera
- Family: Elachistidae
- Genus: Elachista
- Species: E. coalita

Binomial name
- Elachista coalita Kaila, 2011

Species of moth

Elachista coalita is a moth of the family Elachistidae first described by Lauri Kaila in 2011. It is found in south-eastern Australia, including the Australian Capital Territory, New South Wales and Tasmania.

The wingspan is 6.2–8.1 mm for males and 7–7.2 mm for females.
