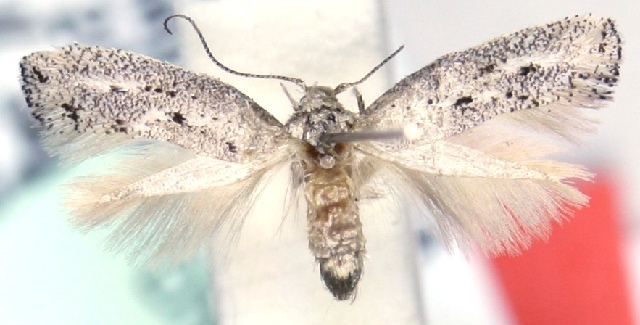

Scientific classification
- Kingdom: Animalia
- Phylum: Arthropoda
- Class: Insecta
- Order: Lepidoptera
- Family: Elachistidae
- Genus: Elachista
- Species: E. stictifica

Binomial name
- Elachista stictifica Kaila, 2011

= Elachista stictifica =

Species of moth

Elachista stictifica is a moth of the family Elachistidae. It is found in Australia.

The wingspan is 9.2–10.2 mm for males and 9.2–9.8 mm for females.
