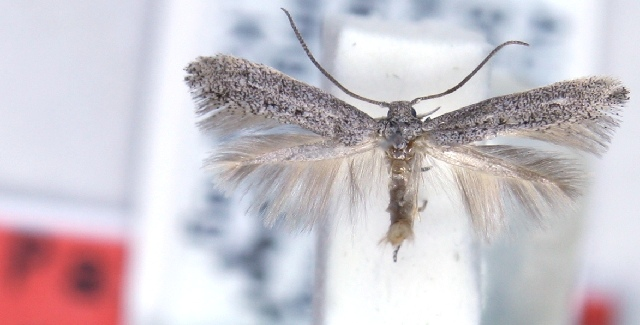

Scientific classification
- Kingdom: Animalia
- Phylum: Arthropoda
- Class: Insecta
- Order: Lepidoptera
- Family: Elachistidae
- Genus: Elachista
- Species: E. crenatella

Binomial name
- Elachista crenatella Kaila, 2011

= Elachista crenatella =

Species of moth

Elachista crenatella is a moth of the family Elachistidae. It is found in the Australian state of South Australia near Adelaide and on Kangaroo Island.

The wingspan is about 11 mm for males.
