= Elachista listrionea =

Scientific classification
- Kingdom: Animalia
- Phylum: Arthropoda
- Class: Insecta
- Order: Lepidoptera
- Family: Elachistidae
- Genus: Elachista
- Species: E. listrionea

Binomial name
- Elachista listrionea Kaila, 2011

Species of moth

Elachista listrionea is a moth of the family Elachistidae. It is found in the Australian state of New South Wales.

The wingspan is about 7 mm for males.
