= Elachista polliae =

Scientific classification
- Kingdom: Animalia
- Phylum: Arthropoda
- Class: Insecta
- Order: Lepidoptera
- Family: Elachistidae
- Genus: Elachista
- Species: E. polliae

Binomial name
- Elachista polliae Kaila, 2011

Species of moth

Elachista polliae is a moth of the family Elachistidae. It is found in Queensland, Australia.

The wingspan is 5.6–6 mm for males and 6-6.2 mm for females. The forewings are blue basally with black scales distally. The hindwings are dark grey.

The larvae feed on Pollia crispata. They mine the leaves of their host plant.
