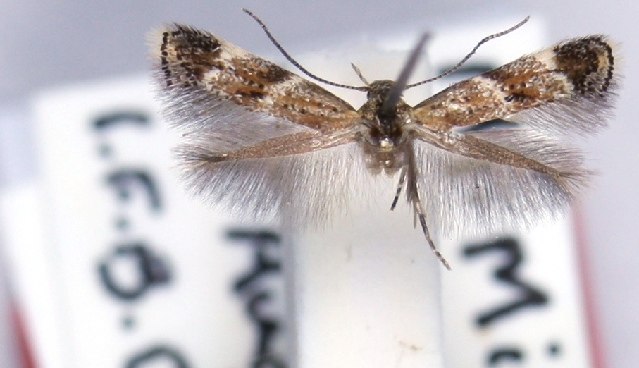

Scientific classification
- Kingdom: Animalia
- Phylum: Arthropoda
- Class: Insecta
- Order: Lepidoptera
- Family: Elachistidae
- Genus: Elachista
- Species: E. propera

Binomial name
- Elachista propera Kaila, 2011

= Elachista propera =

Species of moth

Elachista propera is a moth of the family Elachistidae. It is found in Australia.
