= Elachista cursa =

Scientific classification
- Domain: Eukaryota
- Kingdom: Animalia
- Phylum: Arthropoda
- Class: Insecta
- Order: Lepidoptera
- Family: Elachistidae
- Genus: Elachista
- Species: E. cursa

Binomial name
- Elachista cursa Kaila, 2011

Species of moth

Elachista cursa is a moth of the family Elachistidae. It is found in the Big Desert in Victoria, Australia.

The wingspan is about 9.4 mm for males.
