= Elachista glomerella =

Scientific classification
- Kingdom: Animalia
- Phylum: Arthropoda
- Clade: Pancrustacea
- Class: Insecta
- Order: Lepidoptera
- Family: Elachistidae
- Genus: Elachista
- Species: E. glomerella

Binomial name
- Elachista glomerella Kaila, 2011

Species of moth

Elachista glomerella is a moth of the family Elachistidae. It is endemic to northern Queensland, Australia.

The wingspan is 6.6 millimetres (0.26 in) for males and 6.6–8.2 millimetres (0.26–0.32 in) for females.

The larvae have been reared on a Carex species.
