= Elachista bilobella =

Scientific classification
- Kingdom: Animalia
- Phylum: Arthropoda
- Clade: Pancrustacea
- Class: Insecta
- Order: Lepidoptera
- Family: Elachistidae
- Genus: Elachista
- Species: E. bilobella

Binomial name
- Elachista bilobella Kaila, 2011

Species of moth

Elachista bilobella is a moth of the family Elachistidae that is found in Western Australia.

The wingspan is 10.5 millimetres (0.41 in) for males. The forewings and hindwings are grey.
