= Elachista aluta =

Scientific classification
- Kingdom: Animalia
- Phylum: Arthropoda
- Class: Insecta
- Order: Lepidoptera
- Family: Elachistidae
- Genus: Elachista
- Species: E. aluta

Binomial name
- Elachista aluta Kaila, 2011

Species of moth

Elachista aluta is a moth of the family Elachistidae. It is found in north-eastern Queensland.

The wingspan is 9–9.2 mm for males.
