= Elachista habrella =

Scientific classification
- Kingdom: Animalia
- Phylum: Arthropoda
- Clade: Pancrustacea
- Class: Insecta
- Order: Lepidoptera
- Family: Elachistidae
- Genus: Elachista
- Species: E. habrella

Binomial name
- Elachista habrella Kaila, 2011

Species of moth

Elachista habrella is a moth of the family Elachistidae. It is found along the eastern coast of New South Wales and Queensland.

The wingspan is 6.2–6.4 millimetres (0.24–0.25 in) for males and 5.7–6.4 millimetres (0.22–0.25 in) for females.

The larvae feed on Oplismenus aemulus. They mine the leaves of their host plant.
