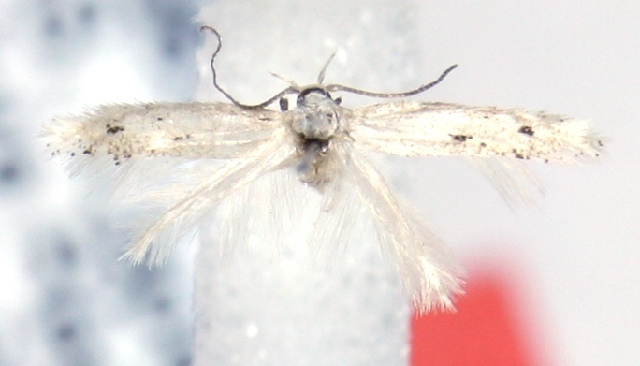

Scientific classification
- Kingdom: Animalia
- Phylum: Arthropoda
- Clade: Pancrustacea
- Class: Insecta
- Order: Lepidoptera
- Family: Elachistidae
- Genus: Elachista
- Species: E. merista

Binomial name
- Elachista merista Kaila, 2011

= Elachista merista =

Species of moth

Elachista merista is a moth of the family Elachistidae that is found in south-eastern Tasmania and Kangaroo Island in South Australia.

The wingspan is about 7 millimetres (0.28 in) for males. The forewings and hindwings are pale.
