= Elachista floccella =

Scientific classification
- Kingdom: Animalia
- Phylum: Arthropoda
- Class: Insecta
- Order: Lepidoptera
- Family: Elachistidae
- Genus: Elachista
- Species: E. floccella

Binomial name
- Elachista floccella Kaila, 2011

Species of moth

Elachista floccella is a moth of the family Elachistidae. It is found in Australia in the Australian Capital Territory, New South Wales and Tasmania.

The wingspan is 11.2–12.8 mm for males and 9.5–12.4 mm for females. The forewings are creamy white. The hindwings are grey.

The larvae feed on both narrow- and broad-leaved variants of Lepidosperma laterale. They mine the leaves of their host plant. Young larvae mine upwards, creating a straight and narrow initial stage of the mine. Later, the mine slowly widens and often turns downwards. The mine reaches a length of about 100 mm. Pupation takes place outside of the mine on a leaf of the host plant.
