= Elachista corneola =

Scientific classification
- Kingdom: Animalia
- Phylum: Arthropoda
- Clade: Pancrustacea
- Class: Insecta
- Order: Lepidoptera
- Family: Elachistidae
- Genus: Elachista
- Species: E. corneola

Binomial name
- Elachista corneola Kaila, 2011

Species of moth

Elachista corneola is a moth of the family Elachistidae that is found in Western Australia.

The wingspan is 7–8.4 millimetres (0.28–0.33 in) for males.
