= Elachista sarota =

Scientific classification
- Kingdom: Animalia
- Phylum: Arthropoda
- Clade: Pancrustacea
- Class: Insecta
- Order: Lepidoptera
- Family: Elachistidae
- Genus: Elachista
- Species: E. sarota

Binomial name
- Elachista sarota Kaila, 2011

Species of moth

Elachista sarota is a moth of the family Elachistidae. It is found in Australia.
