= Elachista scitula =

Scientific classification
- Kingdom: Animalia
- Phylum: Arthropoda
- Clade: Pancrustacea
- Class: Insecta
- Order: Lepidoptera
- Family: Elachistidae
- Genus: Elachista
- Species: E. scitula

Binomial name
- Elachista scitula Kaila, 2011

Species of moth

Elachista scitula is a moth of the family Elachistidae that is endemic to Victoria, Australia.

The wingspan is 7 millimetres (0.28 in) for males and 6.8 millimetres (0.27 in) for females.
