= Elachista menura =

Scientific classification
- Kingdom: Animalia
- Phylum: Arthropoda
- Clade: Pancrustacea
- Class: Insecta
- Order: Lepidoptera
- Family: Elachistidae
- Genus: Elachista
- Species: E. menura

Binomial name
- Elachista menura Kaila, 2011

Species of moth

Elachista menura is a moth of the family Elachistidae that is found in the coastal areas and mountainous areas of New South Wales and Queensland.

The wingspan is 7.5–9.3 millimetres (0.30–0.37 in) for males and 8.1–10 millimetres (0.32–0.39 in) for females. The larvae feed on Gahnia clarkei. They mine the leaves of their host plant. Larvae can be found from July to October.
