= Elachista protensa =

Scientific classification
- Kingdom: Animalia
- Phylum: Arthropoda
- Class: Insecta
- Order: Lepidoptera
- Family: Elachistidae
- Genus: Elachista
- Species: E. protensa

Binomial name
- Elachista protensa Kaila, 2011

Species of moth

Elachista protensa is a moth of the family Elachistidae, it is found in Australia.
