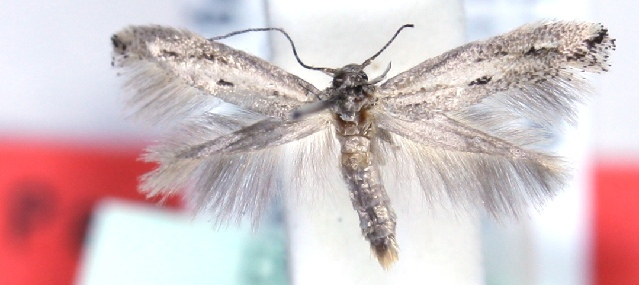

Scientific classification
- Kingdom: Animalia
- Phylum: Arthropoda
- Clade: Pancrustacea
- Class: Insecta
- Order: Lepidoptera
- Family: Elachistidae
- Genus: Elachista
- Species: E. etorella

Binomial name
- Elachista etorella Kaila, 2011

= Elachista etorella =

Species of moth

Elachista etorella is a moth of the family Elachistidae that is endemic to Australia.
