= Elachista cynopa =

Scientific classification
- Kingdom: Animalia
- Phylum: Arthropoda
- Clade: Pancrustacea
- Class: Insecta
- Order: Lepidoptera
- Family: Elachistidae
- Genus: Elachista
- Species: E. cynopa

Binomial name
- Elachista cynopa Meyrick, 1897

Species of moth

Elachista cynopa is a moth species of the family Elachistidae. It is found in Australia in South Australia, Victoria, Tasmania, the Australian Capital Territory and New South Wales. The wingspan is 7.2–8.2 mm for males and 7.6–8.8 mm for females.
