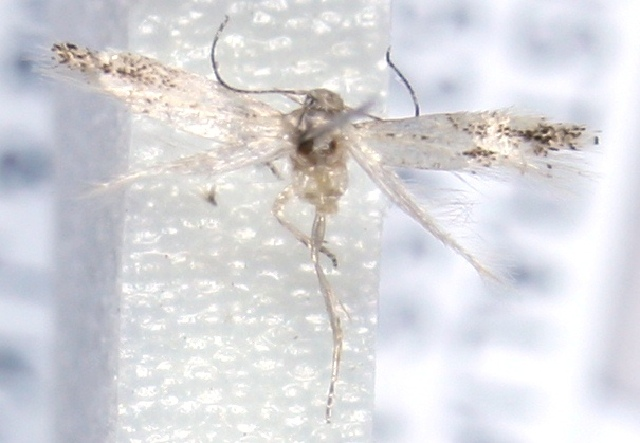

Scientific classification
- Kingdom: Animalia
- Phylum: Arthropoda
- Clade: Pancrustacea
- Class: Insecta
- Order: Lepidoptera
- Family: Elachistidae
- Genus: Elachista
- Species: E. zophosema

Binomial name
- Elachista zophosema (Turner, 1947)

Synonyms
- Phyllocnistis zophosema Turner, 1947; Cosmiotes zophosema

= Elachista zophosema =

Species of moth

Elachista zophosema is a moth of the family Elachistidae that is found in Australia, where it has been recorded from higher altitudes in Tasmania.

The wingspan is 7.2–8 mm for males and about 6.8 mm for females. The ground colour of the forewings is pale ochreous, powdered with pale brownish grey-tipped scales. The hindwings are pale grey.
