= Elachista erebophthalma =

Scientific classification
- Kingdom: Animalia
- Phylum: Arthropoda
- Class: Insecta
- Order: Lepidoptera
- Family: Elachistidae
- Genus: Elachista
- Species: E. erebophthalma

Binomial name
- Elachista erebophthalma Meyrick, 1897

Species of moth

Elachista erebophthalma is a moth of the family Elachistidae. It is found in southernmost Victoria, Australia.
