= Carex polyantha =

Scientific classification
- Kingdom: Plantae
- Clade: Tracheophytes
- Clade: Angiosperms
- Clade: Monocots
- Clade: Commelinids
- Order: Poales
- Family: Cyperaceae
- Genus: Carex
- Species: C. polyantha

Binomial name
- Carex polyantha F.Muell.

Species of plant

Carex polyantha, commonly known as river sedge, is a tussock-forming species of perennial sedge in the family Cyperaceae. It is native to eastern parts of Australia.

The species is found along the eastern coast of Australia from Queensland in the north then south through coastal areas of New South Wales, eastern parts of Victoria and in Tasmania. In Victoria it is found in the Goldfirlds, Riverina, Gippsland, Volcanic Plains grassland and Victorian Alps.

== See also ==
- List of Carex species
