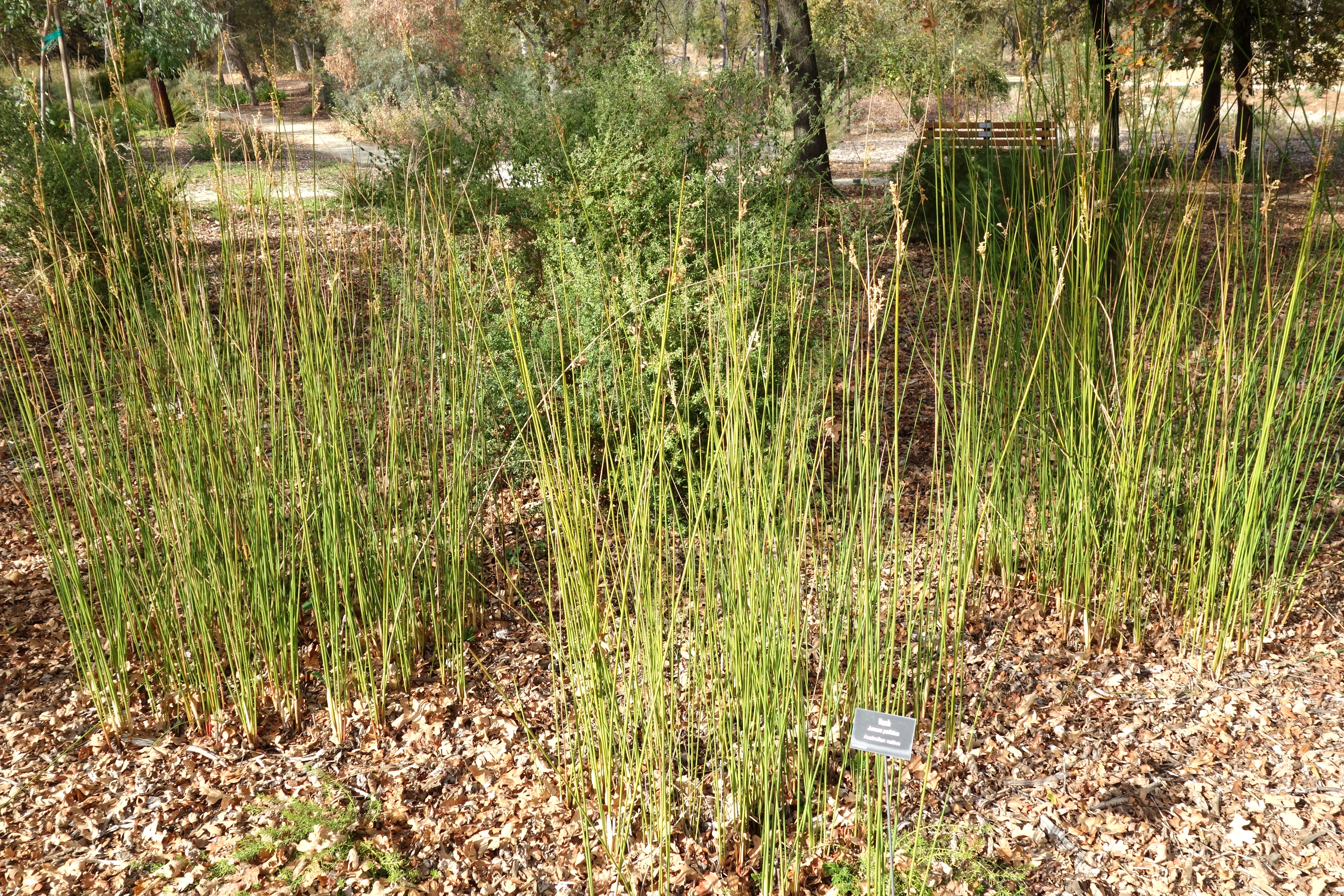

Scientific classification
- Kingdom: Plantae
- Clade: Tracheophytes
- Clade: Angiosperms
- Clade: Monocots
- Clade: Commelinids
- Order: Poales
- Family: Juncaceae
- Genus: Juncus
- Species: J. pallidus

Binomial name
- Juncus pallidus R.Br.

= Juncus pallidus =

Species of plant

Juncus pallidus, commonly known as the great soft-rush pale rush, giant rush, or leafless rush is a species of rush that is native to southern Australia, New Zealand, Norfolk Island, and Lord Howe Island. It is a vigorous, tufted, tussock-forming, rhizomatous perennial herb with culms growing to 70–135 cm in height. The inflorescence, which is 25–185 mm long, contains many straw coloured flowers, each with six floral segments. It is usually found in moist, nutrient-poor soils subject to periodic flooding, such as fresh and brackish waterways, including swamps, creek banks, lake edges and sand seeps.
