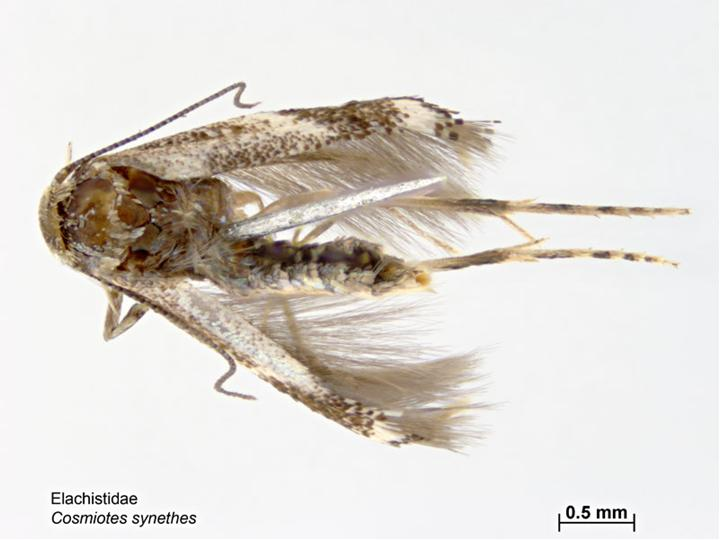

Scientific classification
- Kingdom: Animalia
- Phylum: Arthropoda
- Class: Insecta
- Order: Lepidoptera
- Family: Elachistidae
- Genus: Elachista
- Species: E. synethes

Binomial name
- Elachista synethes Meyrick, 1897

Synonyms
- Cosmiotes synethes; Elachista aphanta Turner, 1923; Lithocolletis scrythrodes Turner, 1947

= Elachista synethes =

Species of moth

Elachista synethes is a moth of the family Elachistidae which can be found in Australia and New Zealand.

The wingspan is 6–8 millimetres (0.24–0.31 in) for males and 6.2–8 millimetres (0.24–0.31 in) for females.

The larvae feed on a wide range of grasses, including Bromus unioloides and have also been recorded on wheat. They mine the blades of their host plant.
