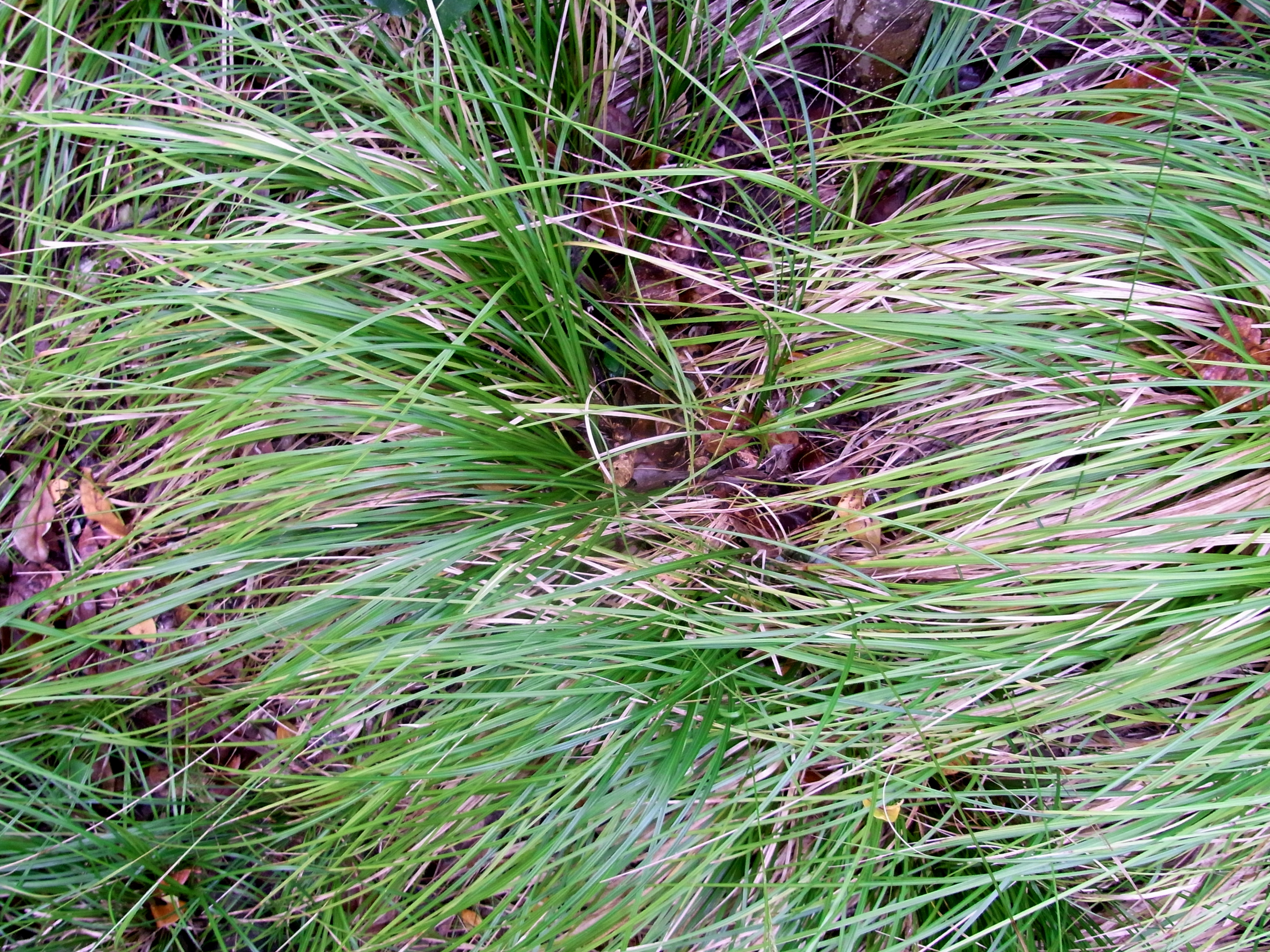
- At Lord Howe Island

Scientific classification
- Kingdom: Plantae
- Clade: Tracheophytes
- Clade: Angiosperms
- Clade: Monocots
- Clade: Commelinids
- Order: Poales
- Family: Cyperaceae
- Genus: Carex
- Species: C. brunnea

Binomial name
- Carex brunnea Thunb.

Synonyms
- Carex hattoriana Tuyama; Carex gracilis R.Br.

= Carex brunnea =

Species of sedge

Carex brunnea, the greater brown sedge, is a species of flowering plant in the sedge family. It is native to China, Japan, Korea, Myanmar, Taiwan, Vietnam, parts of east Africa, as well as eastern Australia and Lord Howe Island. This plant is often seen in disturbed, sunny areas in and near rainforest. This is one of many plants described by Robert Brown and was published in his Prodromus Florae Novae Hollandiae et Insulae Van Diemen (1810). Brown recorded the type "(J.) v.v." Brown's name of Carex gracilis was ruled invalid, as the plant had previously appeared in scientific literature in 1784. Published by the Swedish naturalist Carl Peter Thunberg, in Murray's Systema Vegetabilium, 14th edition.

== Description ==
Carex brunnea forms dense clumps with short rhizomes. Culms are triangular in cross-section and 40-70cm tall. Leaves may be shorter or longer than the culm, the blades 2-3mm wide, folded near the base, gradually flattened toward the tip. Each culm may have up to 10 spikes with both male (staminate) and female (pistillate) flowers, the staminate flowers borne above the pistillate flowers, the male part much shorter than the female part. Pistillate flowers have two styles and develop into plano-convex perigynia 3-3.5mm long.
