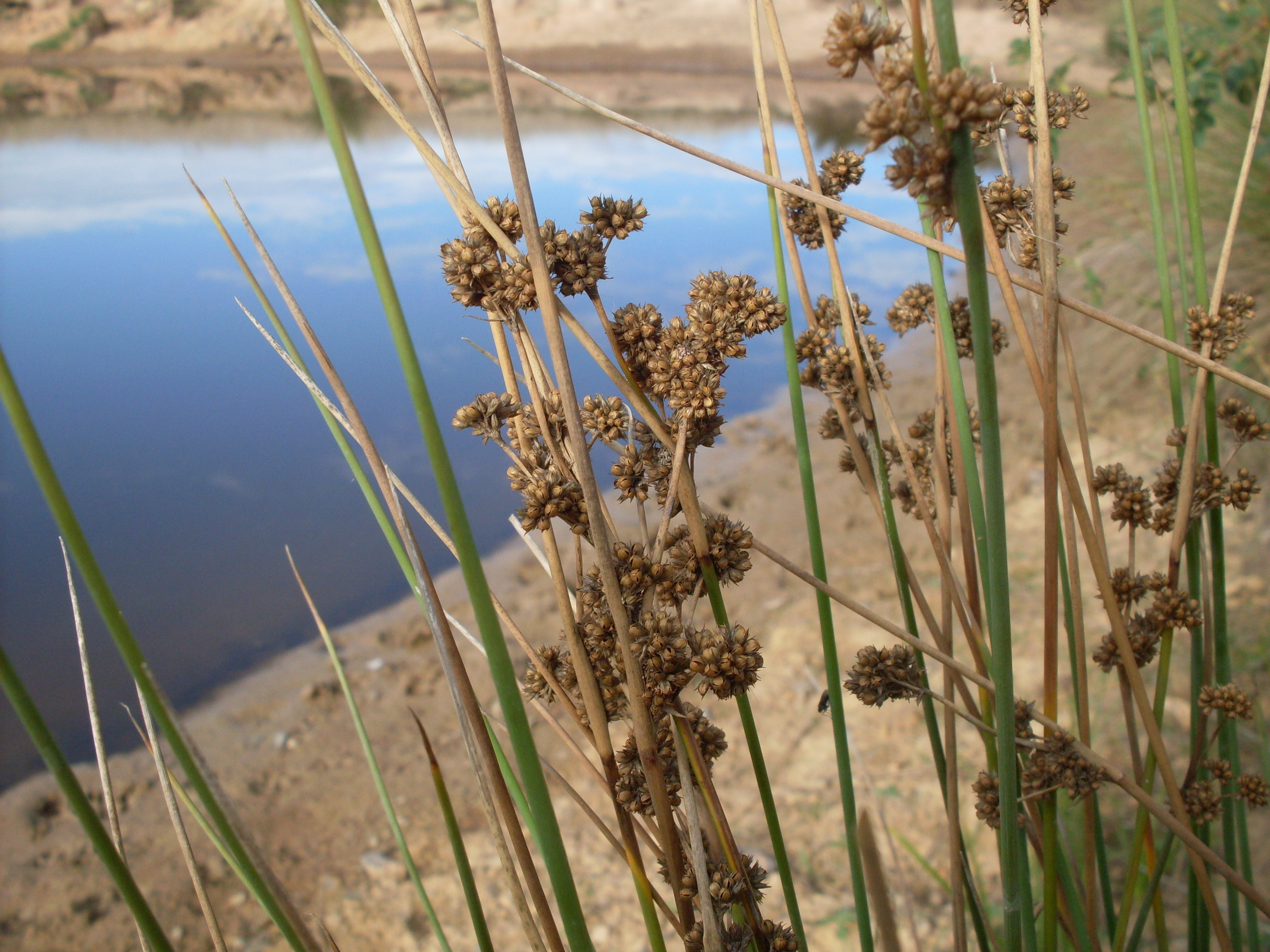

Scientific classification
- Kingdom: Plantae
- Clade: Tracheophytes
- Clade: Angiosperms
- Clade: Monocots
- Clade: Commelinids
- Order: Poales
- Family: Juncaceae
- Genus: Juncus
- Species: J. australis

Binomial name
- Juncus australis Hook.f.

= Juncus australis =

Species of rush

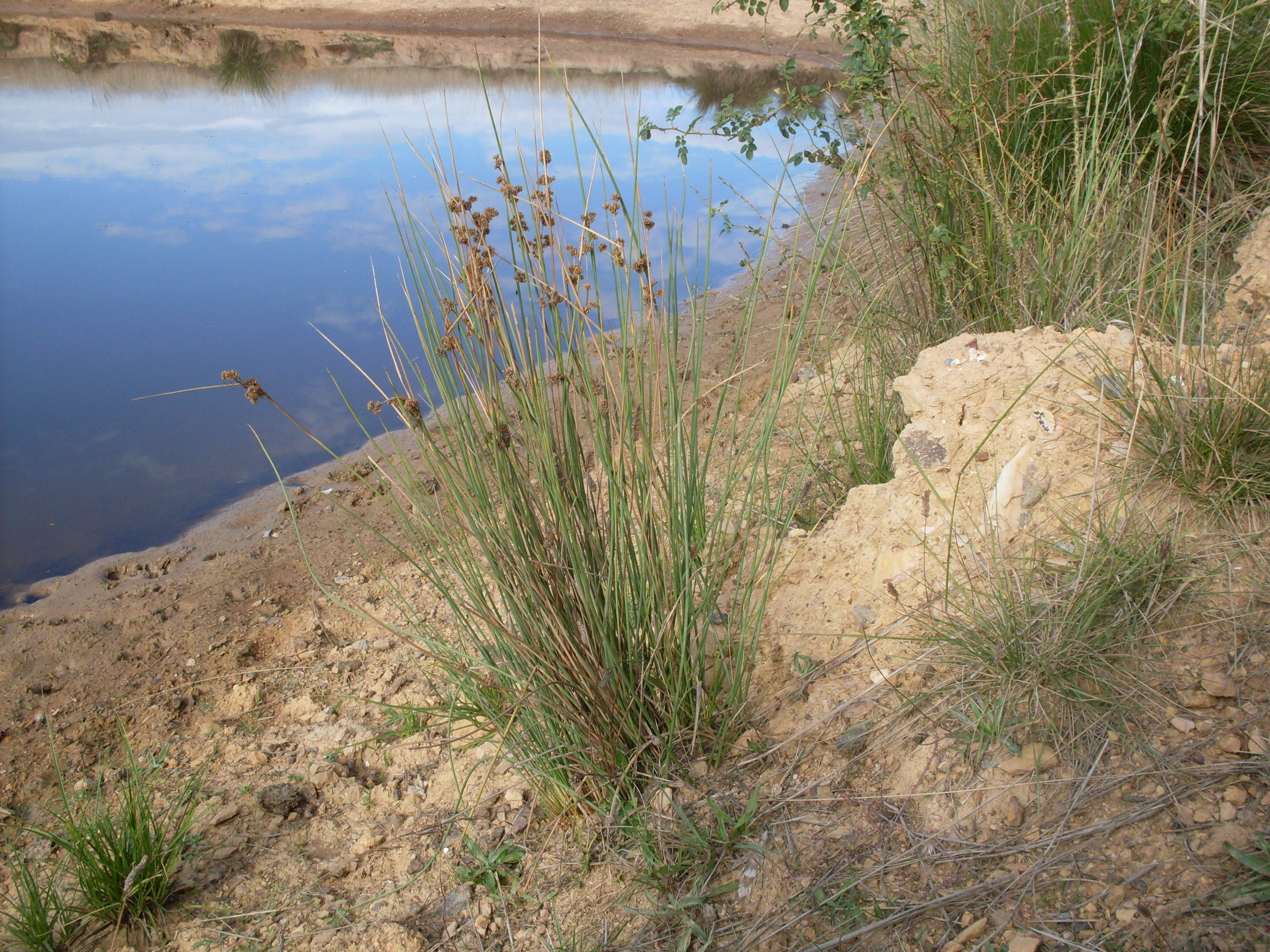
J. australis beside a body of water

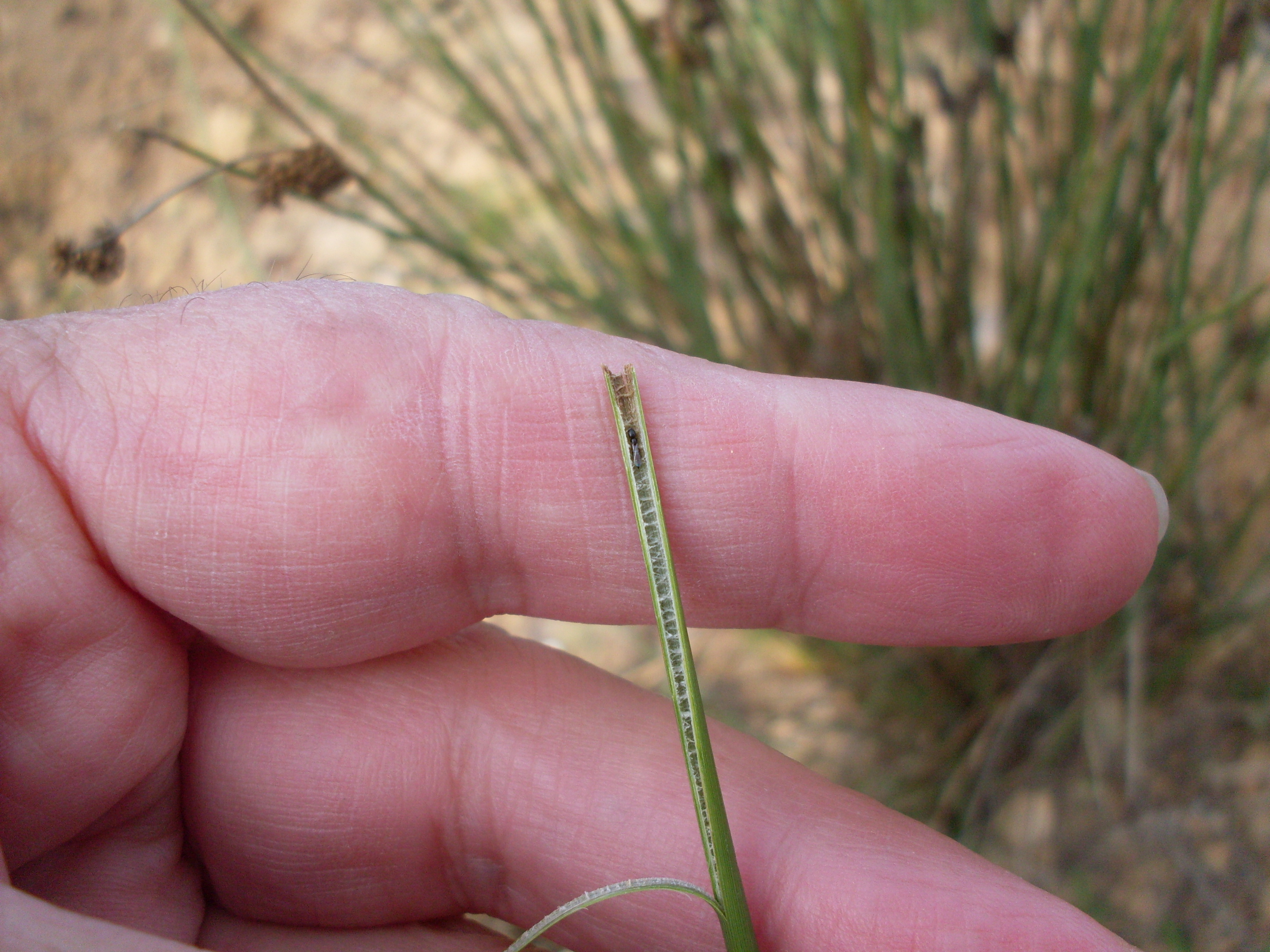
Interrupted pith with a small wasp inside

Juncus australis is a species of rush known by the common names austral rush, leafless rush and wīwī. The species is native to south-eastern Australia and New Zealand, where it can be found around bodies of water. Its habitat is wet or seasonally wet grasslands and woodlands, and it can grow in dense and damp soil along rivers and creeks. It is a rhizomatous perennial rush that grows up to 120 centimetres tall. The plant flowers in clusters, with dense heads at the tip of the stem.

== Description ==
Juncus australis grows predominantly in circular clumps, loosely packed and growing in an open habit. The clumps are often formed around one or a few live or dead stems in the centre of the clump, and grow on average 50 centimetres from other clumps.

The stems of the plant grow vertically, growing 60–120 cm high. The stems are tough and not easily squashed or broken. The colouration of the culm is relatively dull, with no shine, and ranging from green to blue-green or grey-green. The diameter of the culm ranges from 1.5 millimetres to 4 millimetres, with each stem having 30-60 striations, having a consistent distance between each striation. The pith is not solid throughout the culm, generally having large, non-continuous air pockets throughout the stem.

The plant has no leaves, but most culms have several bracts, changing in colour from yellow to brown. The basal sheaths are shiny at the base, and range in colour between dark yellow-brown and chestnut brown. The inflorescence appears in a lateral formation, with “flowers clustered at the ends of stroud branchlet tips; sometimes condensed into a globose head”. The flowers grow to be 2.2 to 3 millimetres long, and with a light green colouration, that turns to light brown later in the plant’s cycle. The flower heads are branched and are formed around one or more dense clusters. The tepals of the flowers are straw-like and have a lightly coloured reddish-brown band, running longitudinally on either side of the stramineous midrib. The capsules are stramineous, with a golden-brown apex. The capsule length is typically 2 to 3 millimetres long, and is typically shorter than, or equal to the tepals, although in rare cases can exceed the tepals. The capsules are ovoid to obovoid, becoming obtuse and almost retuse as the apex of the capsule. The capsules are pale in colour, and are green to greenish brown.

The roots of the plant, the rhizome, grow horizontally through the soil, situated just below the surface of the soil. The roots grow to be 3-5mm in diameter. The plant can also have ascending rhizomes. The roots grow to be 3 to 5 millimetres in diameter. The cataphylls can be both tight or loose, growing out from the base of the plant to around 22 centimetres in length. The cataphylls are usually dark brown, but can also be light brown, though this is less common.

There is some variation of the structure of the plant based on the location Juncus australis grows in. While the piths are typically absent or interrupted across the majority of the species, in the higher altitudes of the Southern Tablelands, the plant has been noted to have continuous pith. The variation of the species found on the Southern Tablelands also has more tightly clustered heads when compared with Juncus australis plants growing at lower altitudes.

=== Similar species ===
Juncus australis bears similar features to other rush species, however there are key distinguishing features. There is a close resemblance to both Juncus amabilis and Juncus flavidus, but the distinguishing features of Juncus australis easily identifies it from these other species. The blue-green to grey-green stems, along with the ridged texture, is notable. The pith also differs from other Juncus species, being usually interrupted or absent, an uncommon feature in rush species. Juncus australis also bears significant resemblance to Juncus gregiflorus, but differs in having a more open habit growth pattern, dull stems, sunken stomates, and a typically paler, obtuse capsule. The blue-green coloration is also unique to Juncus australis, making it easily identifiable, particularly in New Zealand. There is also a white or off-white bloom covering the stems that is unique to this species.

=== Hybrids ===
Two hybrids with Juncus australis are known. Juncus subsedendus, also known as the fingered rush, and Juncus flavidus, also known as the leafless rush or yellow rush, have both been noted.

== Ecology ==
Juncus australis has flowering and fruiting seasons that follow typical seasonal patterns of its temperate climate. The plant flowers from September to December, in synthesis with spring in the Southern Hemisphere. The fruiting season of Juncus australis ranges from November to May.

The spatial pattern of dispersal is an important factor in the development of biotic communities. The propagation methods of Juncus australis allow for environmentally pervasive dispersal. The seeds are mucilaginous, which disperse through attachment, water and wind. The mucilaginous coating provides a hydrophobic and waxy seal that assists in floatation, allowing the seeds to disperse easily through movements of water. Wind dispersal is aided by propagules with a high surface area to volume ratio, increasing the potential dispersal range through increased air resistance, allowing the propagules to travel further. Due to the various propagation methods, Juncus australis plants are easily grown from fresh seeds.

Juncus australis is a perennial rush species, meaning that its lifespan extends beyond a single year. Juncus australis plants, while blooming in the spring, typically survive through the winter to bloom again the following year.

== Location ==
Juncus australis is endemic to wet and seasonally wet grasslands in temperate areas. Due to its thriving in wet grasslands, the species is found in coastal areas. Juncus australis can also be found in the lower area of montane ecosystems.

The species typically grows in poorly drained soils with a high clay content. Given that the plant thrives in dense and damp soil, Juncus australis is often found along creek lines and rivers, as well as along drainage lines. The species is often found in swampy ground and damp pasture, ranging from sea level to the sub-alpine areas. The species, like other rush species, often grow in shady areas. Though the plant typically grows in lower altitudes, it has been recorded at altitudes between 600 metres above sea level and 1200 metres above sea level.

While Juncus australis grows in predominantly wet areas of grasslands, it is a hardy plant species. It is able to survive dry periods of extended time without rainfall. This demonstrates the species's adaptability to the Australian temperate climate, where drought can have significant effects on whole ecosystems and on individual plant species. Being able to withstand both extended dry periods and periods of excessive rainfall and inundation allows it to settle and persevere long term across temperate grasslands.

Juncus australis has been seen to grow effectively in areas that have experienced a level of human disturbance. This is due to its ability to grow in damp pastures, and open grasslands that may previously have been host to a larger number of trees, opening up more space for the species to appear in. Further, the development of human made infrastructure, such as drainage lines that produce a similar environment to creek lines or riverbeds, have created more places for the species to grow in, leading some to suggest that Juncus australis has a greater range now than prior to European settlement. This is significant to the continued spread of the plant, as native vegetation communities have seen significantly altered, and in some cases, completely cleared, in the past two centuries since European settlement, causing significant impacts on the ecosystems surrounding Juncus australis. Being able to survive through human intervention, and continuing to be able to grow in its desired biophysical conditions has meant the continued survival and commonality of the plant species.

== Distribution ==
The distribution of Juncus australis is almost completely natural. The species is not being intentionally planted anywhere, but grows and spreads across its habitats through its effective organic propagation mechanisms.

Juncus australis is found across southeast Australia and parts of New Zealand. Within New South Wales, the plant has been noted as far north as Glen Innes, in the North Tablelands. The species is found in much of NSW, extending down from the North Tablelands to the Central Tablelands and Southern Tablelands, and going as far west as Wellington and Albury. There are also recorded sightings of the plant in coastal areas, such as on the Central Coast and the South Coast. It has also been recorded in the alpine regions of the Snowy Mountains and the Victorian Alps. The species has also been recorded in much of Victoria, but is more heavily distributed on the eastern side of the State, continuing the coastal line of distribution from NSW into the southeast corner of Australia. While the species in Australia is predominantly found along the south-east coastline, notably in New South Wales and Victoria, there are also recordings of the plant in Queensland, South Australia, the Australian Capital Territory, and Tasmania. The species was recorded as far north as Cairns in Queensland, but this is a significant outlier compared to the rest of the data, as it is much further north than any other recording of the plant. There are 863 recorded sightings of Juncus australis as noted on the Australasian Virtual Herbarium, with 213 recordings in Victoria, and 269 recordings in New South Wales, clearly demonstrating the density of the species’ distribution in the south east of Australia, when compared with other areas of Australia and New Zealand.

Juncus australis has been recorded on both the North and South Islands of New Zealand. The plant has also been found on the Kermadec Islands, a mostly uninhabited island arc situated northeast of New Zealand’s North Island. The species has also been noted on Norfolk Island, an external Australian territory to the nation’s east.

== Uses ==
Juncus australis is not often used by humans, with almost all of the species being naturally occurring in its habitats. In many cases it is regarded as a weed, particularly when it invades pasture lands. Juncus australis is not, and is unlikely to become, a popular garden plant.

There are, however, uses for Juncus australis, particularly as a feature for landscaping. Due to its growth patterns in wetlands and damp soils, Juncus australis is a useful species to plant along bodies of water, such as edging for dams and waterways, as it can help with bank stabilisation. It has also been noted as an effective ornamental plant, providing a habitat for waterbirds around ponds. As a tough reed, it functions well as an ornamental planting around creeks and ponds, as both a feature plant and as a mass planting.

The species is occasionally sold, and can be found in specialist native plant nurseries.

There is also some evidence to suggest that there may have been some traditional uses of the plant by Aboriginal people. The seeds have been identified as a potential food source. The stems of Juncus species have also been used as fibre for string and basket making. This is reflected in the etymology of the name, as juncus comes from the Latin word ‘jungere’, meaning to tie or bind, identifying the usage of the stems to make cord.
