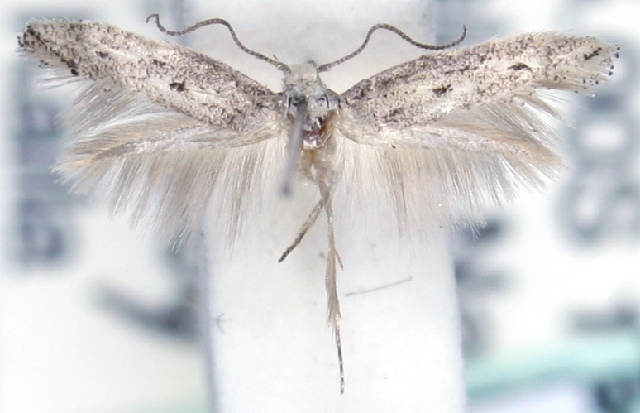

Scientific classification
- Kingdom: Animalia
- Phylum: Arthropoda
- Clade: Pancrustacea
- Class: Insecta
- Order: Lepidoptera
- Family: Elachistidae
- Genus: Elachista
- Species: E. melanthes

Binomial name
- Elachista melanthes (Meyrick, 1887)

Synonyms
- Atalopsycha melanthes Meyrick, 1887

= Elachista melanthes =

Species of moth

Elachista melanthes is a moth of the family Elachistidae. It is found in the temperate areas of Australia, including south-western Western Australia, South Australia, the Australian Capital Territory and New South Wales.

The larvae feed on Lepidosperma semiteres. They mine the leaves of their host plant.
