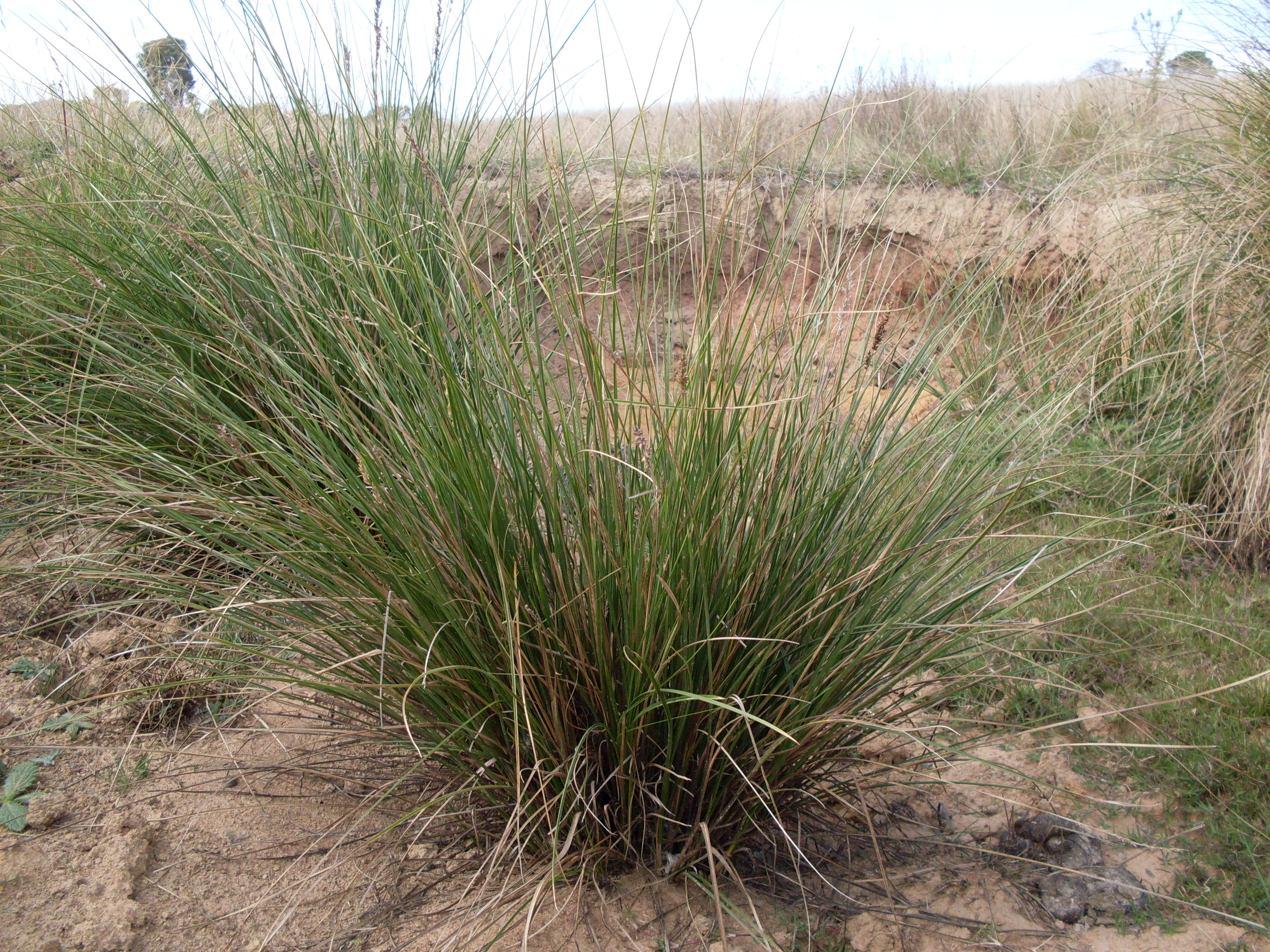

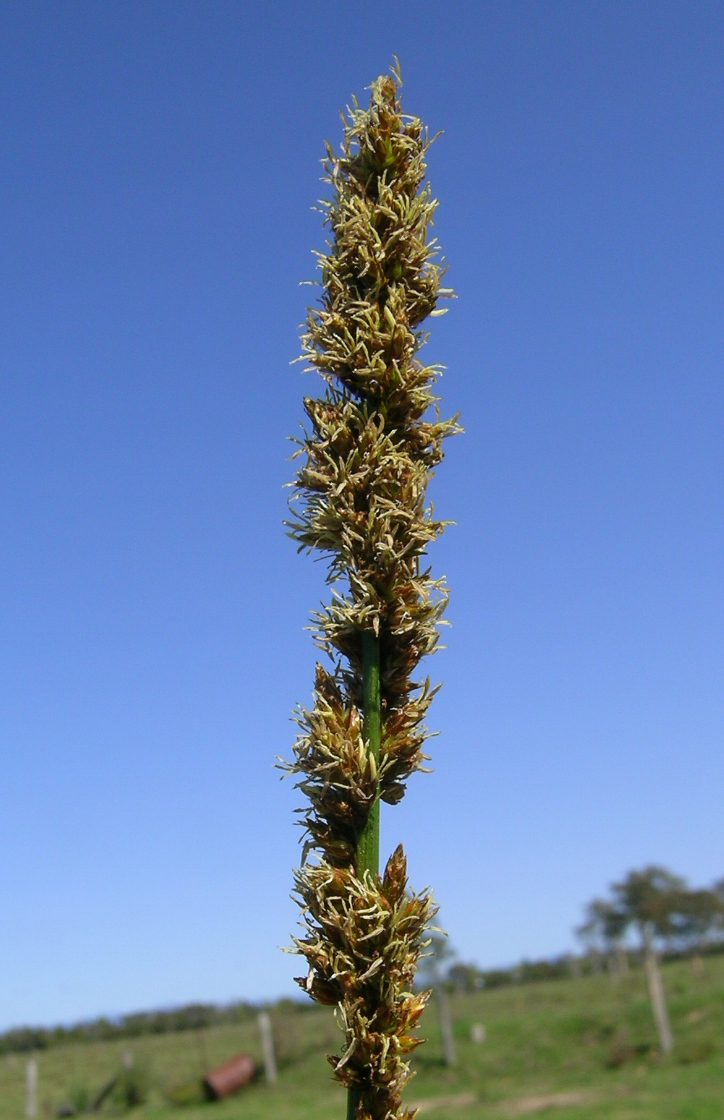

Scientific classification
- Kingdom: Plantae
- Clade: Tracheophytes
- Clade: Angiosperms
- Clade: Monocots
- Clade: Commelinids
- Order: Poales
- Family: Cyperaceae
- Genus: Carex
- Species: C. appressa

Binomial name
- Carex appressa R.Br.
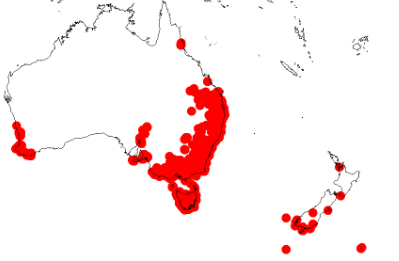
- Australasian occurrence data from AVH

Synonyms
- List: Carex appressa var. diaphana (Boott) Kük.; Carex appressa f. minor Kük.; Carex appressa var. typica Domin; Carex appressa var. virgata (Sol. ex Boott) Kük.; Carex chlorantha var. composita F.Muell.; Carex collata Boott; Carex diaphana Boott; Carex discolor Reinw. ex de Vriese; Carex paniculata var. appressa (R.Br.) Cheeseman; Carex paniculata var. subdiaphana F.Muell.; Carex paniculata var. virgata (Sol. ex Boott) Cheeseman; Carex virgata Sol. ex Boott; Carex virgata var. abbreviata Boeckeler; Vignea appressa (R.Br.) Rchb.

= Carex appressa =

Species of sedge

Carex appressa, the tall sedge, is a species of flowering plant in the family Cyperaceae. It is native to New Guinea, Australia, New Zealand, and generally in the South West Pacific.

== Description ==
Carex appressa is a densely tufted, perennial sedge that forms clumps up to 50 cm (20 in) in diameter. Its stems grow to around 100 cm (39 in) in height, and are hard and solid, becoming rough towards the top of the stem. Its leaves are 3–6 mm (0.12–0.24 in) wide, are rough on the margins, and grow mostly out of the base of the plant. It has a brownish, spike-like inflorescence made of 20 or more spikes, growing 5–25 cm (2.0–9.8 in) long. Its flowers are numerous oval-shaped brownish spikelets that are approximately 5 mm (0.20 in) long, with both male and female flowers mixed together in the spikes. Its nut is contained in a flattened, oval-shaped, beaked, hairless sack or utricle that is 3–3.5 mm (0.12–0.14 in) long.

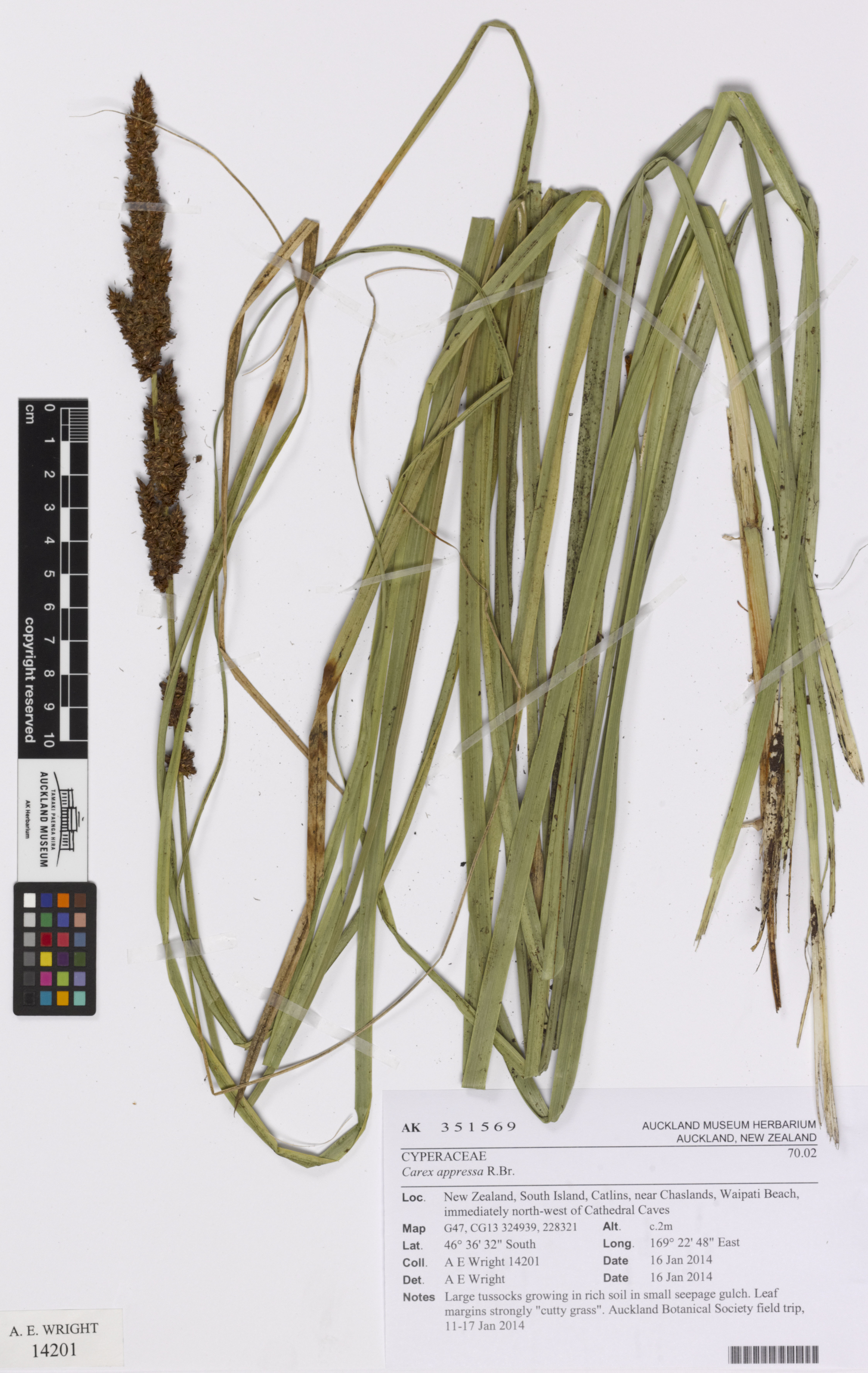
Auckland Museum (AM AK351569)

== Habitat and ecology ==
Carex appressa occurs in swamps, watercourses, and occasionally in water. It also serves as a larval food plant for Heteronympha cordace.
