= Lauri Kaila =

Finnish entomologist and lepidoperist

Lauri Kaila is a Finnish entomologist and researcher of biodiversity, specializing in Lepidoptera, at the Finnish Museum of Natural History of the University of Helsinki. As of 2026, Kaila authored 205 species within the family of Elachistidae.

== Publications ==
See Wikispecies below.

== See also ==
- Category:Taxa named by Lauri Kaila
