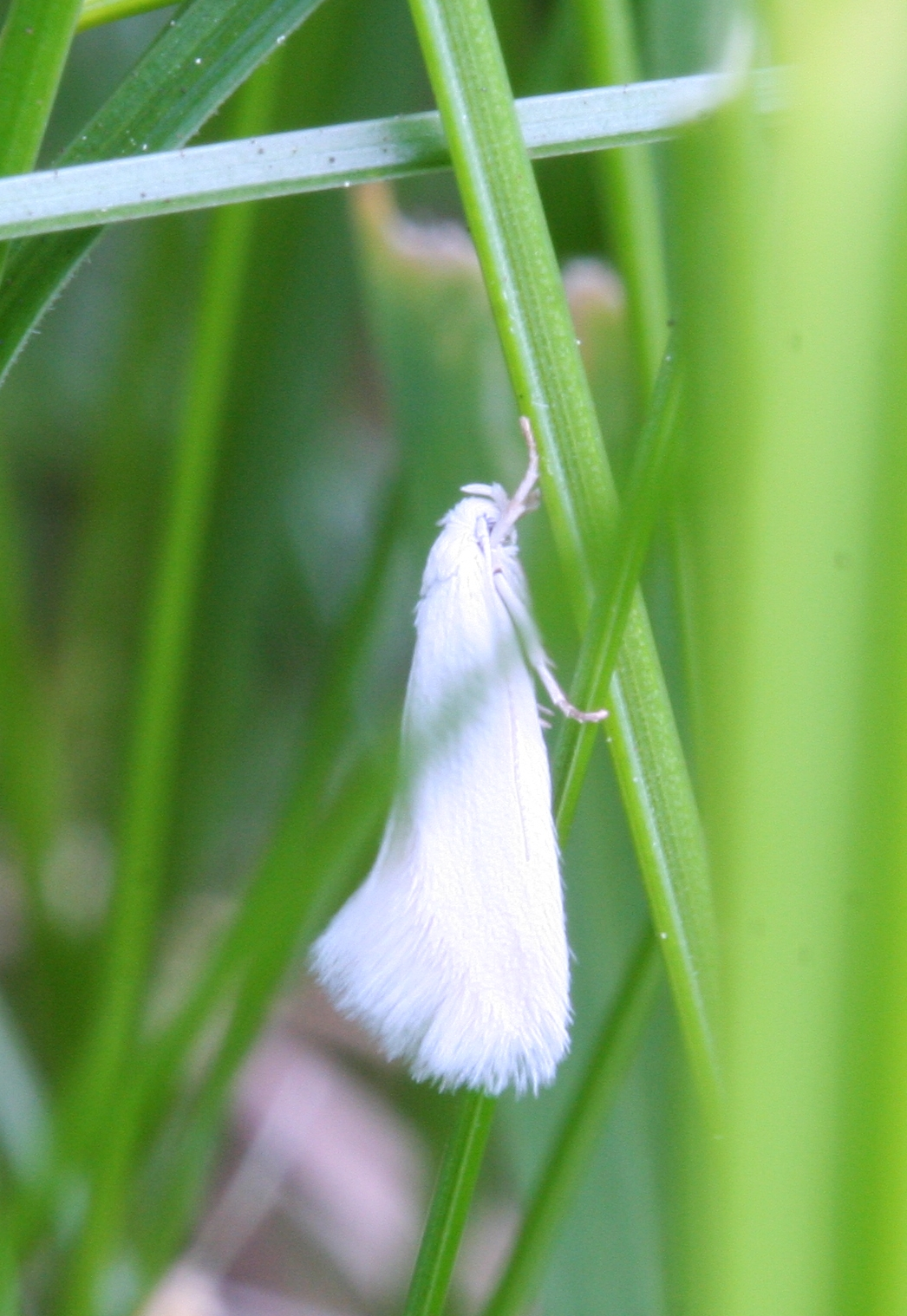
- Adult Elachista argentella at Ĳmuiden, the Netherlands

Scientific classification
- Kingdom: Animalia
- Phylum: Arthropoda
- Clade: Pancrustacea
- Class: Insecta
- Order: Lepidoptera
- Family: Elachistidae
- Subfamily: Elachistinae
- Genus: Elachista; Treitschke in Ochsenheimer, 1833

Type species
- Elachista bifasciella Treitschke in Ochsenheimer, 1833

Species
- Numerous, see text

Synonyms
- Numerous, see text

= Elachista =

Genus of moths

Elachista is a genus of gelechioid moths described by Georg Friedrich Treitschke in 1833. It is the type genus of the grass-miner moth family (Elachistidae). This family is sometimes (in particular in older sources) circumscribed very loosely, including for example the Agonoxenidae and Ethmiidae which seem to be quite distinct among the Gelechioidea, as well as other lineages which are widely held to be closer to Oecophora than to Elachista and are thus placed in the concealer moth family Oecophoridae here.

These grass-miners are very small moths with the "feathery" hindwings characteristic of their family. They are essentially found worldwide, except in very cold places and on some oceanic islands; as usual for Gelechioidea, they are most common in the Palearctic however. They usually have at least one, sometimes as many as three light bands running from leading to trailing edge of their forewing uppersides. Some species, however, have upper forewings that are mostly white.

== Selected species ==
Not all species of this large genus have been discovered yet, let alone validly described and named. Several small genera, e.g. Biselachista and Cosmiotes, are here included in Elachista as junior synonyms (see below). They seem to be at least as closely related to E. bifasciella (the type species of the present genus) than other species commonly placed here, if not actually closer. In addition, Elachista contains several cryptic species complexes – such as the one around E. dispunctella and E. triseriatella – whose systematics and taxonomy are still not fully resolved.

A number of Elachista species have been assigned to one of several groups, which may or may not be monophyletic, and whose names in the literature do not consistently follow the usual taxonomic practice (i.e. using as namesake the group-member which was described first). Some of these groups are placed in either of the two large subgenera Elachista (Aphelosetia) and Elachista (Elachista). Other proposed subgenera – the small Elachista (Dibrachia) and Elachista (Hemiprosopa) – are here included in the species of unclear relationships; like some small species-groups, they stand a chance of rendering the two larger subgenera paraphyletic if accepted as distinct, but seem too unlike them to warrant placement in either.

=== Subgenus Elachista (Aphelosetia) ===
argentella group (sometimes in bedellella group)

- Elachista acenteta
- Elachista achrantella
- Elachista adempta
- Elachista adianta
- Elachista anagna
- Elachista aphyodes
- Elachista apina
- Elachista arena
- Elachista argentella (type of Aphelosetia)
- Elachista argillacea
- Elachista aspila
- Elachista aurocristata
- Elachista conidia
- Elachista coniophora
- Elachista controversa
- Elachista dissona
- Elachista epimicta
- Elachista granosa
- Elachista griseicornis
- Elachista hololeuca
- Elachista inopina
- Elachista ischnella
- Elachista lamina
- Elachista lomionella
- Elachista loriella
- Elachista louisella
- Elachista lurida
- Elachista nubila
- Elachista nucula
- Elachista orestella
- Elachista ossuaria
- Elachista patriodoxa
- Elachista perniva
- Elachista ripula Kaila, 1998
- Elachista sabulella
- Elachista scobifera
- Elachista sincera
- Elachista spatiosa
- Elachista symmorpha
- Elachista synopla
- Elachista thelma
- Elachista triangulifera
- Elachista triatomea
- Elachista virgatula Kaila, 1997 (type of Aphigalia)

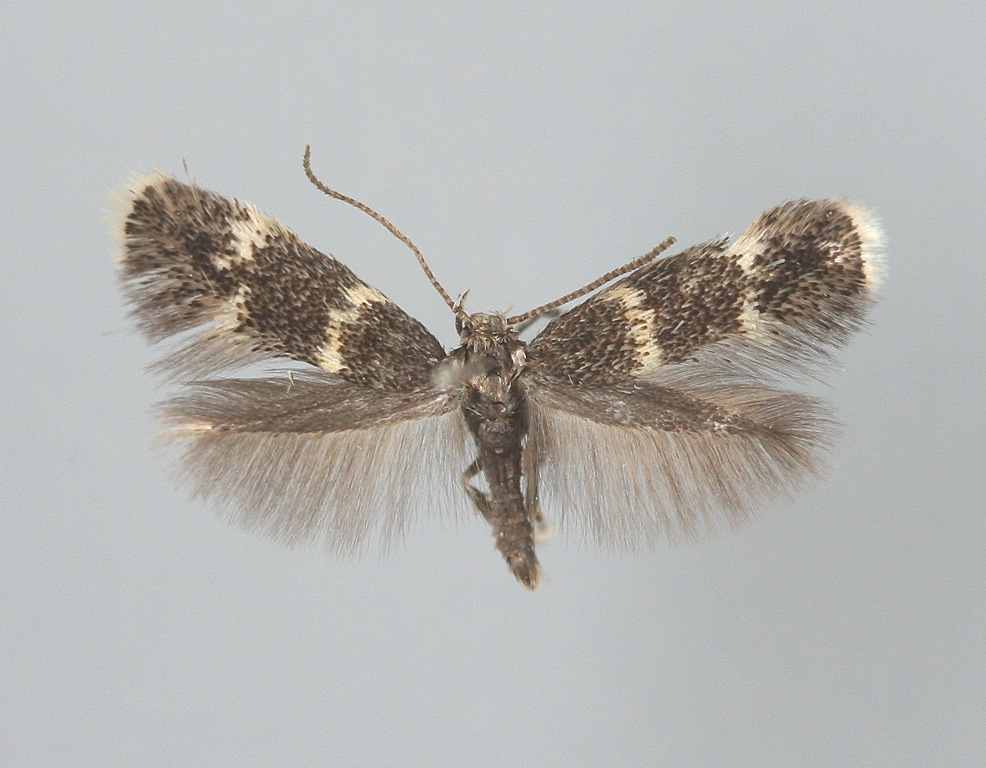
Adult male Elachista pullicomella specimen from Tvärminne, Hanko Peninsula, Finland

bedellella/unifasciella group (including collitella group)

- Elachista adscitella Stainton, 1851
- Elachista antonia Kaila, 2007
- Elachista bedellella (Sircom, 1848)
- Elachista bisulcella (Duponchel, [1843])
- Elachista bruuni Traugott-Olsen, 1990
- Elachista camilla Kaila, 2007
- Elachista cahorsensis Traugott-Olsen, 1992
- Elachista chrysodesmella Zeller, 1850
- Elachista cingillella (Herrich-Schäffer, 1855)
- Elachista collitella (Duponchel, [1843])
- Elachista crocogastra Meyrick, 1908
- Elachista dispilella Zeller, 1839
- Elachista dispunctella (Duponchel, [1843])
- Elachista distigmatella Frey, 1859
- Elachista dorinda Kaila, 2007
- Elachista fasciola Parenti, 1983
- Elachista festucicolella Zeller, 1853
- Elachista gangabella Zeller, 1850
- Elachista gregori Traugott-Olsen, 1988
- Elachista heinemanni Frey, 1866 (sometimes in E. subalbidella; tentatively placed here)
- Elachista istanella Nielsen & Traugott-Olsen, 1987
- Elachista laetella Rebel, 1930 (sometimes in E. subalbidella; tentatively placed here)
- Elachista levasi Sruoga, 1998
- Elachista littoricola Le Marchand, 1938
- Elachista lugdunensis Frey, 1859
- Elachista metella Kaila, 2002
- Elachista nedaella Traugott-Olsen, 1985
- Elachista nitidulella (Herrich-Schäffer, 1855)
- Elachista nolckeni Sulcs, 1992 (tentatively placed here)
- Elachista obliquella Stainton, 1854
- Elachista pollinariella Zeller, 1839
- Elachista pollutissima Staudinger, 1880
- Elachista pullicomella
- Elachista purella Sruoga, 2000
- Elachista revinctella Zeller, 1850
- Elachista rudectella Stainton, 1851
- Elachista slivenica Kaila, 2007
- Elachista squamosella (Duponchel, [1843])
- Elachista subalbidella
- Elachista subocellea
- Elachista sutteri Kaila, 2002
- Elachista tinctella Sinev & Sruoga, 1995
- Elachista titanella Kaila & Jalava, 1994
- Elachista triseriatella Stainton, 1854
- Elachista unifasciella (Haworth, 1828)
- Elachista versicolora Kaila, 2007
- Elachista cf. dispunctella 'Volgograd Oblast'

Elachista (Aphelosetia) incertae sedis

- Elachista acutella Kaila, 2003
- Elachista aeruginosa Parenti, 1981
- Elachista afghana Parenti, 1981
- Elachista agelensis Traugott-Olsen, 1996
- Elachista amparoae Traugott-Olsen, 1992
- Elachista amseli Rebel, 1833
- Elachista andorraensis Traugott-Olsen, 1988
- Elachista anitella Traugott-Olsen, 1985
- Elachista arduella Kaila, 2003
- Elachista arenbergeri Traugott-Olsen, 1988
- Elachista atrisquamosa Staudinger, 1880
- Elachista baldizzonei Traugott-Olsen, 1996
- Elachista baldizzonella Traugott-Olsen, 1985
- Elachista bazaella Traugott-Olsen, 1992
- Elachista bazaensis Traugott-Olsen, 1990
- Elachista bengtssoni Traugott-Olsen, 1992
- Elachista berndtiella Traugott-Olsen, 1985
- Elachista bigorrensis Traugott-Olsen, 1990
- Elachista blancella Traugott-Olsen, 1992
- Elachista casascoensis Traugott-Olsen, 1992
- Elachista catalana Parenti, 1978
- Elachista catalunella Traugott-Olsen, 1992
- Elachista chamaea Kaila, 2003
- Elachista chionella Mann, 1861
- Elachista cirrhoplica Kaila, 2012
- Elachista clintoni Traugott-Olsen, 1992
- Elachista constitella Frey, 1859
- Elachista contisella Chrétien, 1922
- Elachista cornuta Parenti, 1981
- Elachista cretula Kaila, 2011
- Elachista cuencaensis Traugott-Olsen, 1992
- Elachista curonensis Traugott-Olsen, 1990
- Elachista dalmatiensis Traugott-Olsen, 1992
- Elachista deceptricula Staudinger, 1880
- Elachista derbendi Parenti, 1981
- Elachista disemiella Zeller, 1847
- Elachista drenovoi Parenti, 1981
- Elachista dumosa Parenti, 1981
- Elachista elsaella Traugott-Olsen, 1988
- Elachista enochra Kaila, 2011
- Elachista esmeralda Parenti, 1981
- Elachista exigua Parenti, 1978
- Elachista filicornella Kaila, 1992
- Elachista flavescens Parenti, 1981
- Elachista fuscibasella Chrétien, 1915
- Elachista galactitella Eversmann, 1844
- Elachista galbina Kaila, 2012
- Elachista gebzeensis Traugott-Olsen, 1990
- Elachista gerdmaritella Traugott-Olsen, 1992
- Elachista gibbera Kaila, 2003
- Elachista gielisi Traugott-Olsen, 1992
- Elachista gilvula Kaila, 2012
- Elachista glaseri Traugott-Olsen, 1992
- Elachista gormella Nielsen & Traugott-Olsen, 1987
- Elachista graeca Parenti, 2002
- Elachista grandella Traugott-Olsen, 1992
- Elachista grotenfelti Kaila, 2012
- Elachista habeleri Traugott-Olsen, 1990
- Elachista hallini Traugott-Olsen, 1992
- Elachista hedemanni Rebel, 1899
- Elachista heringi Rebel, 1899
- Elachista hispanica Traugott-Olsen, 1992
- Elachista ilicrina Falkovich, 1986
- Elachista imbi Traugott-Olsen, 1992
- Elachista intrigella Traugott-Olsen, 1992
- Elachista jaeckhi Traugott-Olsen, 1990
- Elachista jubarella Kaila, 2011
- Elachista kabuli Parenti, 1981
- Elachista karsholti Traugott-Olsen, 1992
- Elachista kasyi Parenti, 1981
- Elachista klimeschiella Parenti, 2002
- Elachista latipenella Sinev & Budashkin, 1991
- Elachista lerauti Traugott-Olsen, 1992
- Elachista liskai Kaila, 2011
- Elachista louiseae Traugott-Olsen, 1992
- Elachista luqueti Traugott-Olsen, 1992
- Elachista maboulella Chretien, 1915
- Elachista maculata Parenti, 1978
- Elachista madridensis Traugott-Olsen, 1992
- Elachista mannella Traugott-Olsen, 1992
- Elachista manni Traugott-Olsen, 1990
- Elachista melancholica Frey, 1859
- Elachista michelseni Traugott-Olsen, 1992
- Elachista microdigitata Parenti, 1983
- Elachista minusculella Traugott-Olsen, 1992
- Elachista moroccoensis Traugott-Olsen, 1992
- Elachista modesta Parenti, 1978
- Elachista multipunctata Sruoga, 1990
- Elachista multipunctella Traugott-Olsen, 1992
- Elachista neapolisella Traugott-Olsen, 1985
- Elachista nevadensis Parenti, 1978
- Elachista nielspederi Traugott-Olsen, 1992
- Elachista nuraghella Amsel, 1951
- Elachista occidentella Traugott-Olsen, 1992
- Elachista occulta Parenti, 1978
- Elachista ohridella Parenti, 2001
- Elachista olemartini Traugott-Olsen, 1992
- Elachista olschwangi Kaila, 2003
- Elachista oukaimedenensis Traugott-Olsen, 1988
- Elachista ozeini Parenti, 2004
- Elachista parvula Parenti, 1978
- Elachista passerini Traugott-Olsen, 1996
- Elachista phragmitella Sruoga, 1992
- Elachista pocopunctella Traugott-Olsen, 1992
- Elachista pollutella Duponchel, 1843
- Elachista povolnyi Traugott-Olsen, 1992
- Elachista punctella Traugott-Olsen, 1992
- Elachista rikkeae Traugott-Olsen, 1992
- Elachista rissaniensis Traugott-Olsen, 1992
- Elachista rutjani Kaila, 2011
- Elachista senecai Traugott-Olsen, 1992
- Elachista sinevi Traugott (Sruoga, 1992)
- Elachista skulei Traugott-Olsen, 1992
- Elachista spumella Caradja, 1920
- Elachista steueri Traugott-Olsen, 1990
- Elachista subula Parenti, 1991
- Elachista svenssoni Traugott-Olsen, 1988
- Elachista szocsi Parenti, 1978
- Elachista teruelensis Traugott-Olsen, 1990
- Elachista totanaensis Traugott-Olsen, 1992
- Elachista toveella Traugott-Olsen, 1985
- Elachista tribertiella Traugott-Olsen, 1985
- Elachista turkensis Traugott-Olsen, 1990
- Elachista unicornis Parenti, 1991
- Elachista vanderwolfi Traugott-Olsen, 1992
- Elachista varensis Traugott-Olsen, 1992
- Elachista vartianae Parenti, 1981
- Elachista vegliae Parenti, 1978
- Elachista veletaella Traugott-Olsen, 1992
- Elachista vivesi Traugott-Olsen, 1992
- Elachista vulcana Kaila, 2011
- Elachista wadielhiraensis Traugott-Olsen, 1992
- Elachista zuernbaueri Traugott-Olsen, 1990

=== Subgenus Elachista (Atachia) ===
These are sorted in the presumed phylogenetic sequence.

gerasmia group, gerasmia section

Incertae sedis

- Elachista magidina
- Elachista floccella
- Elachista velutina
- Elachista carcharota
- Elachista crenatella
- Elachista bidens
- Elachista alampeta
- Elachista cursa
- Elachista eriodes
- Elachista illota
- Elachista ceratiola
- Elachista bilobella
- Elachista filiphila
- Elachista merista
- Elachista lopadina
- Elachista patania
- Elachista indigens
- Elachista cf. indigens
- Elachista averta
- Elachista anolba
- Elachista flavicilia
- Elachista tetraquetri
- Elachista effusi
- Elachista deusta
- Elachista rubiginosae
- Elachista ophelma
- Elachista catagma
- Elachista ruscella
- Elachista sarota
- Elachista syntomella
- Elachista scopulina
- Elachista nodosae
- Elachista discina

Elachista cynopa complex

- Elachista ligula
- Elachista toryna
- Elachista ascidiella
- Elachista repanda
- Elachista prolatella
- Elachista protensa
- Elachista campsella
- Elachista spinodora
- Elachista glossina
- Elachista opima
- Elachista pharetra
- Elachista rudicula
- Elachista corbicula
- Elachista mystropa
- Elachista trulla
- Elachista euthema
- Elachista cynopa
- Elachista epartica
- Elachista zeta
- Elachista chilotera
- Elachista mundula
- Elachista listrionea
- Elachista crumilla
- Elachista aposematica
- Elachista chloropepla

Elachista melanthes complex

- Elachista melanthes
- Elachista platysma
- Elachista stictifica
- Elachista lachnella
- Elachista cf. melanthes

Elachista gerasmia complex

- Elachista gerasmia
- Elachista physalodes
- Elachista peridiola
- Elachista phascola

Elachista paragauda complex

- Elachista paragauda
- Elachista toralis
- Elachista paryphoea
- Elachista spathacea
- Elachista cylistica
- Elachista faberella
- Elachista etorella
- Elachista gladiograpta
- Elachista gladiatrix
- Elachista spongicola

gerasmia group, catarata section

- Elachista menura
- Elachista flammula
- Elachista crocospila
- Elachista glomerella
- Elachista sphaerella
- Elachista cf. sphaerella A
- Elachista cf. sphaerella B
- Elachista cf. sphaerella C
- Elachista cf. sphaerella D
- Elachista sapphirella
- Elachista patersoniae Kaila, 2011
- Elachista catarata Meyrick, 1897
- Elachista mutarata Kaila, 2011
- Elachista laterina Kaila, 2011
- Elachista ictera Kaila, 2011
- Elachista asperae Kaila, 2011
- Elachista ophthalma Kaila, 2011
- Elachista coalita Kaila, 2011
- Elachista corneola Kaila, 2011

erebophthalma group

- Elachista erebophthalma
- Elachista evexa
- Elachista rhomboidea
- Elachista leucastra

puplesisi group

- Elachista helia Kaila & Sruoga, 2014
- Elachista puplesisi Sruoga, 2000

=== Subgenus Elachista (Hemiprosopa) ===
- Elachista altaica Sinev, 1998
- Elachista dasycara Kaila, 1999 (=albella (Chambers, 1877) nec Muller, 1776)

=== Subgenus Elachista (Elachista) ===
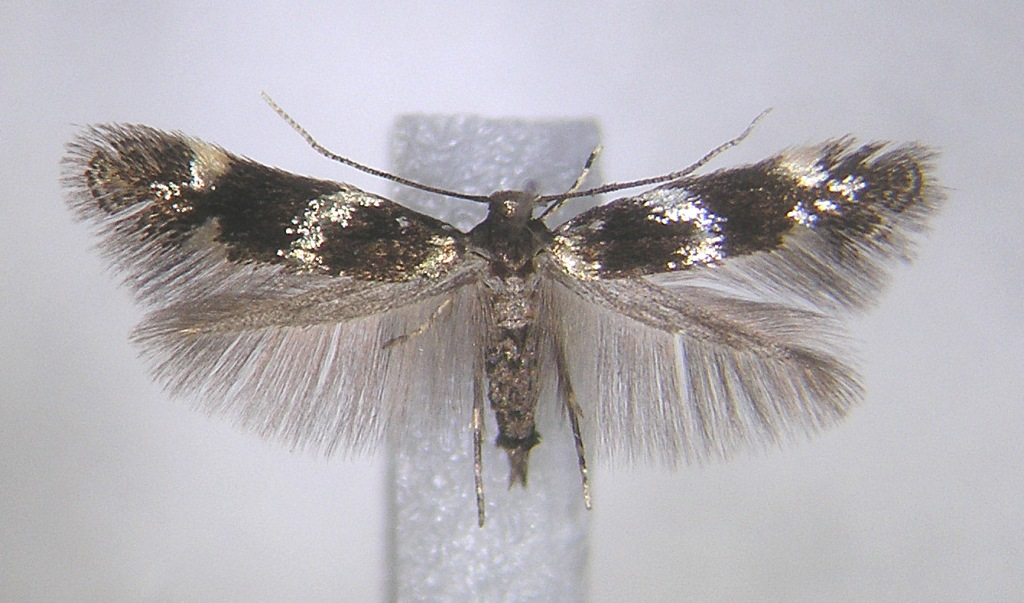
Adult female Elachista apicipunctella specimen from Sonkajärvi (Finland)

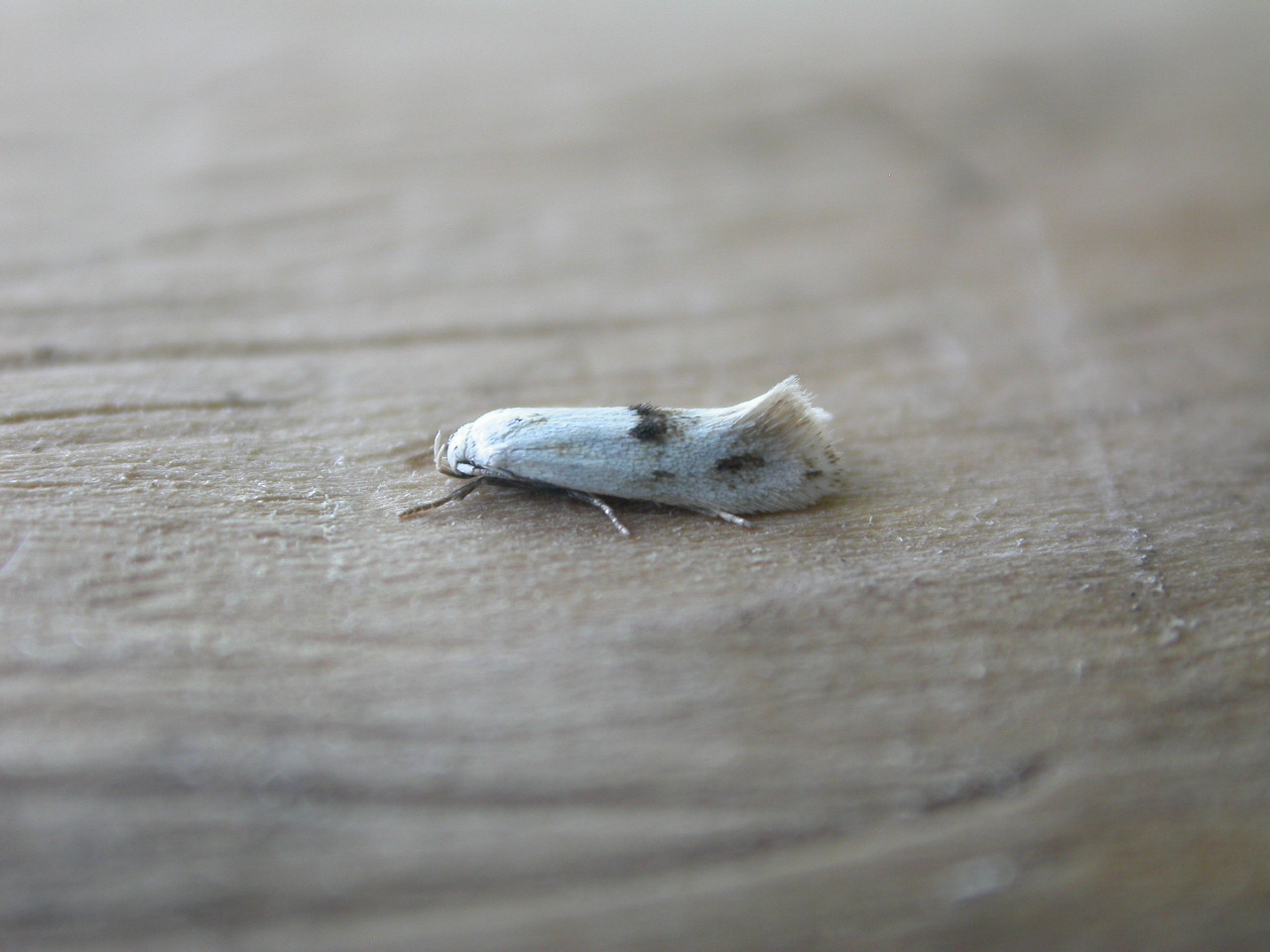
Adult Elachista maculicerusella specimen from Hellerup (Denmark)

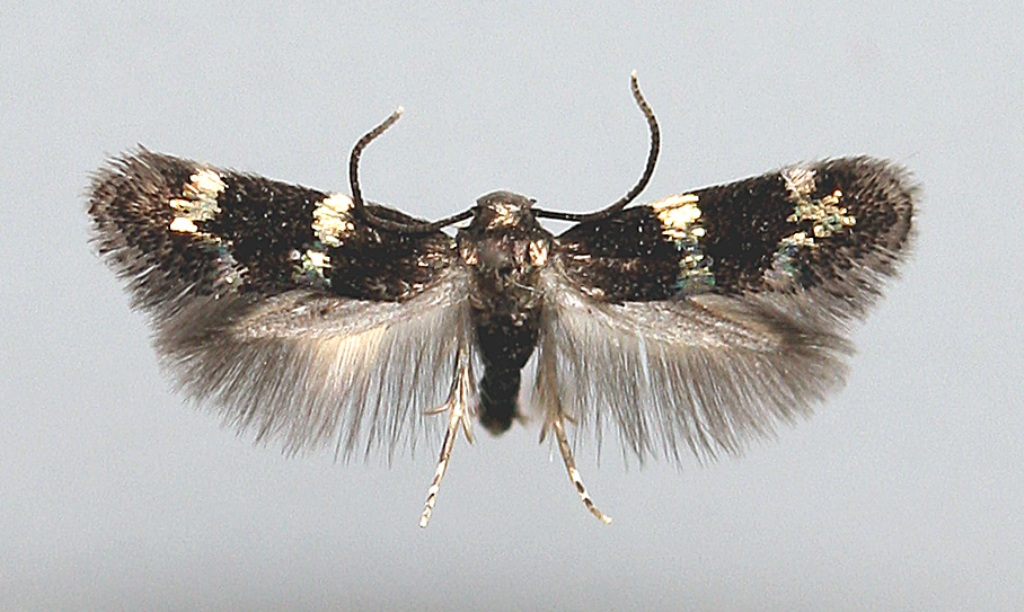
Adult male Elachista gleichenella specimen from Kangasniemi (Finland)

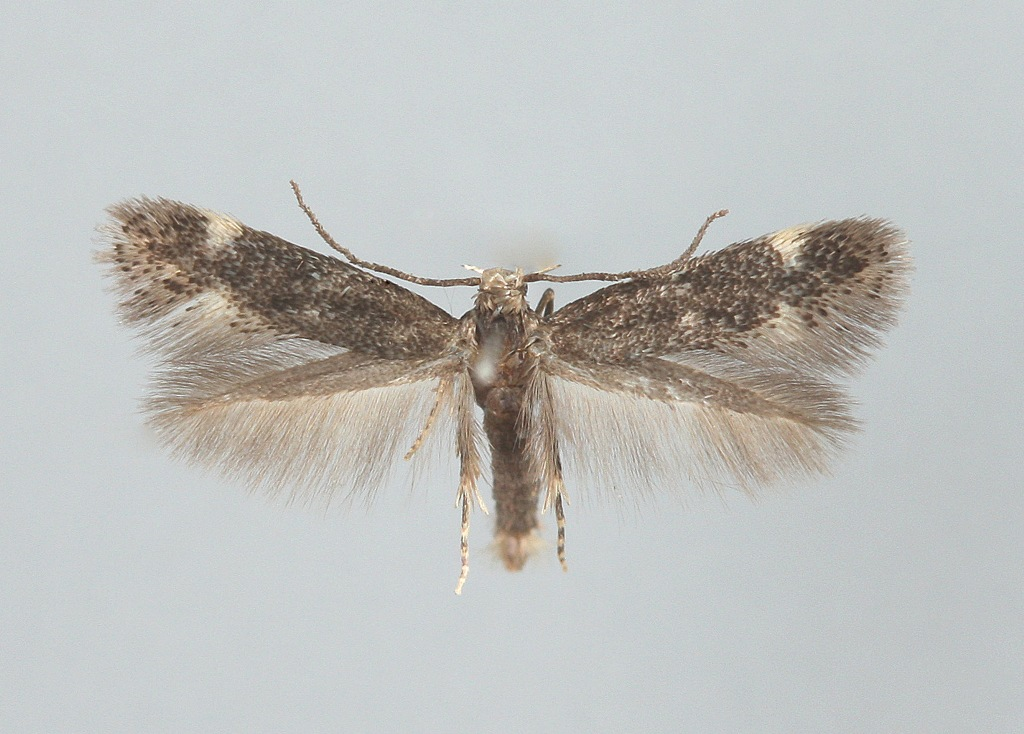
Adult male Elachista humilis specimen from Sonkajärvi (Finland)

albifrontella/bifasciella group

- Elachista aerinella Kaila, 1999
- Elachista albifrontella (Hübner, [1817])
- Elachista alpinella
- Elachista amrodella Kaila, 1999
- Elachista antipodensis (Dugdale, 1971)
- Elachista apicipunctella
- Elachista aredhella Kaila, 1999
- Elachista arthadella Kaila, 1999
- Elachista atricomella
- Elachista baikalica Kaila, 1992
- Elachista bifasciella Treitschke, 1833
- Elachista bregorella Kaila, 1999
- Elachista caranthirella Kaila, 1999
- Elachista celegormella Kaila, 1999
- Elachista cicadella Kaila, 1999
- Elachista compsa Traugott-Olsen, 1974
- Elachista curufinella Kaila, 1999
- Elachista daeronella Kaila, 1999
- Elachista dagnirella Kaila, 1999
- Elachista deriventa Kaila & Mutanen, 2008
- Elachista diederichsiella E.Hering, 1889
- Elachista diorella Kaila, 1999
- Elachista dolabella Kaila, 1999
- Elachista elegans Frey, 1859
- Elachista excelsicola
- Elachista finarfinella Kaila, 1999
- Elachista fuscofrontella Sruoga, 1990
- Elachista gildorella Kaila, 1999
- Elachista gorlimella Kaila, 1999
- Elachista habrella
- Elachista haldarella Kaila, 1999
- Elachista hiranoi Sugisima, 2005
- Elachista indisella Kaila, 1999
- Elachista jaskai Kaila, 1998
- Elachista jupiter Sugisima, 2005
- Elachista kilmunella Stainton, 1849
- Elachista leifi Kaila & Kerppola, 1992
- Elachista luticomella
- Elachista maglorella Kaila, 1999
- Elachista marachella Kaila, 1999
- Elachista micalis
- Elachista morwenella Kaila, 1999
- Elachista nobilella
- Elachista olorinella Kaila, 1999
- Elachista phalaridis Parenti, 1983
- Elachista platina
- Elachista poae Stainton, 1855
- Elachista ragnorella Kaila, 1999
- Elachista scitula
- Elachista sulcsiella Savenkov, 2013
- Elachista tanaella Aarvik & Berggren, 2004
- Elachista tauronella Kaila, 1999
- Elachista telcharella Kaila, 1999
- Elachista telerella Kaila, 1999
- Elachista turgonella Kaila, 1999
- Elachista cf. bifasciella
- Elachista cf. kilmunella 'Chelyabinsk Oblast'
- Elachista cf. platina
- Elachista sp. 'Chelyabinsk Oblast'

cerusella/monosemiella group

- Elachista anserinella Zeller, 1839
- Elachista lastrella Chrètien, 1896
- Elachista maculicerusella
- Elachista rufocinerea
- Elachista wieseriella Huemer, 2000 (tentatively placed here)

gleichenella group

- Elachista enitescens Braun, 1921
- Elachista gerasimovi Sruoga, 2000
- Elachista gleichenella
- Elachista ievae Sruoga, 2008
- Elachista madarella (Clemens, 1860)
- Elachista nitensella Sinev & Sruoga, 1995
- Elachista regificella Sircom, 1849
- Elachista similis Sugisima, 2005
- Elachista tengstromi (tentatively placed here)

orba group

- Elachista commoncommelinae
- Elachista cyanea
- Elachista polliae
- Elachista nielsencommelinae
- Elachista orba Meyrick 1921
- Elachista cf. orba

praelineata group

- Elachista amamii Parenti, 1983
- Elachista aranella Kaila, 1999
- Elachista aristoteliella Kaila, 1999
- Elachista aurita
- Elachista caliginosa Parenti, 1983
- Elachista eilinella Kaila, 1999
- Elachista fasciocaliginosa Sugisima, 2005
- Elachista guilinella Kaila, 1999
- Elachista ibunella Kaila, 1999
- Elachista kurokoi Parenti, 1983
- Elachista miriella Kaila, 1999
- Elachista miscanthi Parenti, 1983
- Elachista nienorella Kaila, 1999
- Elachista praelineata Braun 1915
- Elachista serindella Kaila, 1999
- Elachista turinella Kaila, 1999

pulchella group

- Elachista canapennella
- Elachista eskoi
- Elachista herrichii Frey, 1859
- Elachista humilis
- Elachista krogeri Svensson, 1976
- Elachista nielswolffi Svensson, 1976
- Elachista orstadii Palm, 1943
- Elachista pomerana
- Elachista subnigrella Douglas, 1853
- Elachista vonschantzi Svensson, 1976
- Elachista zernyi

solena group

- Elachista ignicolor
- Elachista solena

saccharella group

- Elachista dulcinella Kaila, 1999
- Elachista hedionella Kaila, 1999
- Elachista helodella Kaila, 1999
- Elachista saccharella Busck, 1934
- Elachista suavella Kaila, 1999
- Elachista uniolae Kaila, 1999

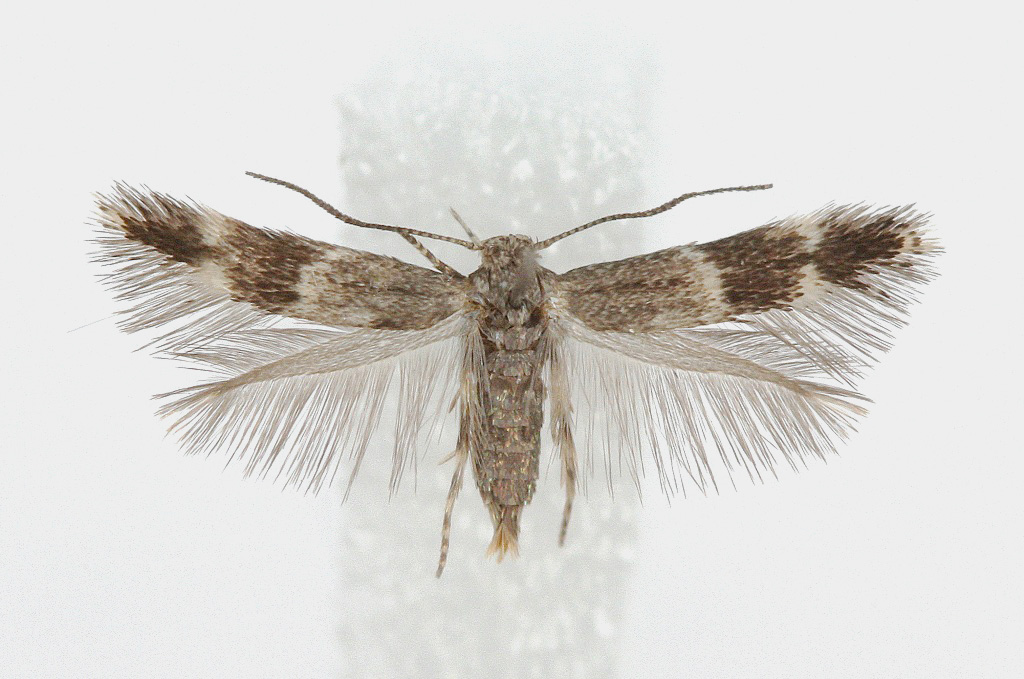
Adult female Elachista exactella specimen from Sonkajärvi, Finland

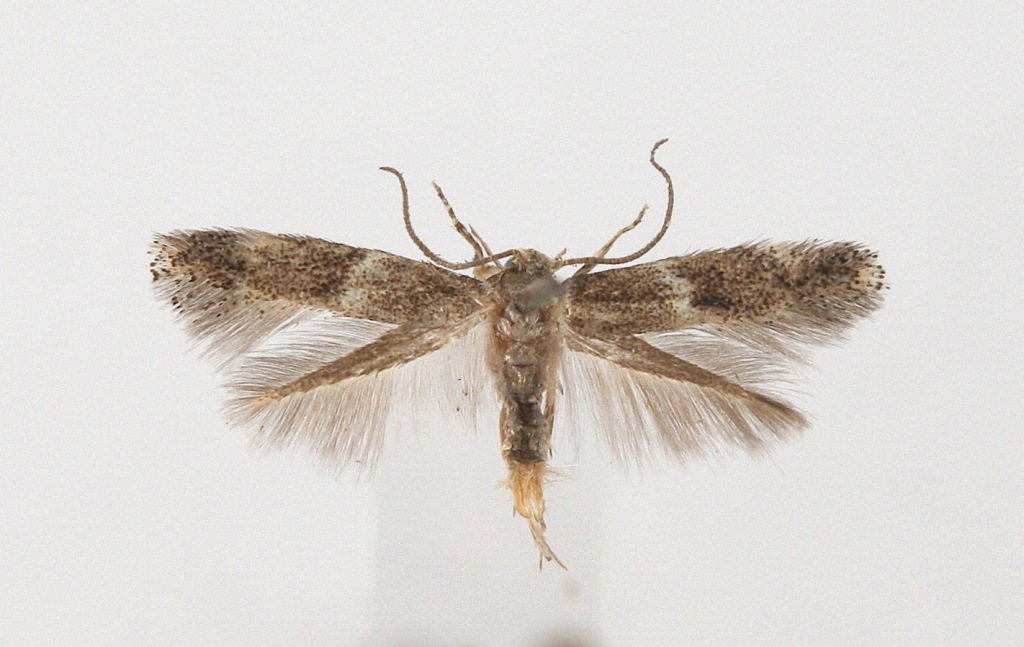
Adult male Elachista exactella specimen

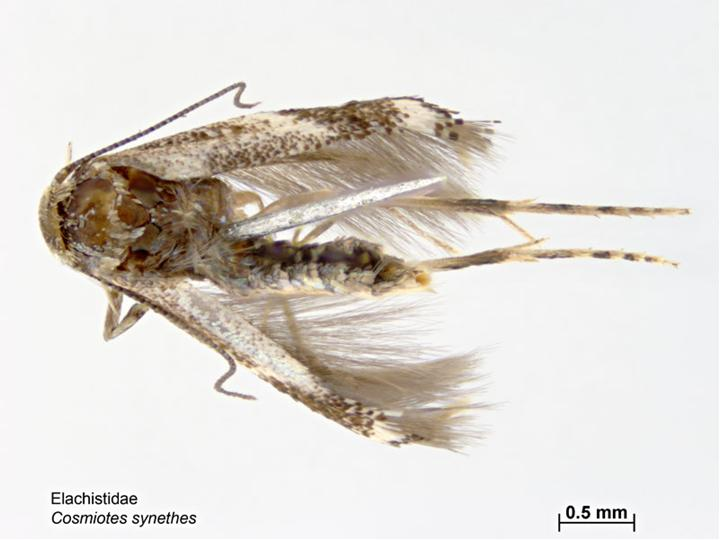
Adult Elachista synethes specimen ventral

"Cosmiotes"/freyerella group

Incertae sedis

- Elachista albrechti Kaila, 1998
- Elachista amseli (Parenti, 1981)
- Elachista antipetra Meyrick, 1922
- Elachista baltica E.Hering, 1891 (sometimes in E. freyerella; tentatively placed here)
- Elachista beorella Kaila, 1999
- Elachista consortella Stainton, 1851 (tentatively placed here)
- Elachista deficiens Meyrick, 1922
- Elachista epicaeria (Diakonoff, 1955)
- Elachista exactella (tentatively placed here)
- Elachista herbigrada Braun, 1925
- Elachista heteroplaca Meyrick, 1934
- Elachista galadella Kaila, 1999
- Elachista illectella (Clemens, 1860) (type of Cosmiotes)
- Elachista infuscata Frey, 1882 (sometimes in E. exactella; tentatively placed here)
- Elachista inscia (Meyrick, 1913)
- Elachista ksarella Chrétien, 1908
- Elachista laquaeorum (Dugdale, 1971)
- Elachista lorigera (Meyrick, 1921) (type of Ptilodoxa)
- Elachista neithanella Kaila, 1999
- Elachista nipponicella Sugisima, 2006
- Elachista nymphaea Meyrick, 1911
- Elachista obtusella Sruoga, 2008
- Elachista ochroleuca Meyrick 1923
- Elachista pallens (Sruoga, 1990)
- Elachista planicara Kaila, 1998
- Elachista quadrata Meyrick, 1932
- Elachista rianella Kaila, 1999
- Elachista spiculifera Meyrick, 1922
- Elachista stabilella Stainton, 1858 (tentatively placed here)
- Elachista stichospora Meyrick, 1932
- Elachista tuberella Sruoga, 2008
- Elachista tuorella Kaila, 1999

Elachista freyerella complex

- Elachista freyerella
- Elachista propera
- Elachista dieropa
- Elachista elaphria
- Elachista cycotis
- Elachista vitellina
- Elachista citrina
- Elachista cerebrosella
- Elachista melina
- Elachista gemadella
- Elachista ravella
- Elachista cerina
- Elachista diligens
- Elachista aepsera
- Elachista zophosema
- Elachista litharga
- Elachista levipes
- Elachista cerrita
- Elachista velox
- Elachista impiger
- Elachista alacera
- Elachista essymena
- Elachista festina

Elachista synethes complex

- Elachista fucosa
- Elachista seductilis
- Elachista synethes
- Elachista strenua
- Elachista sandaraca
- Elachista helvola
- Elachista delira
- Elachista cf. synethes

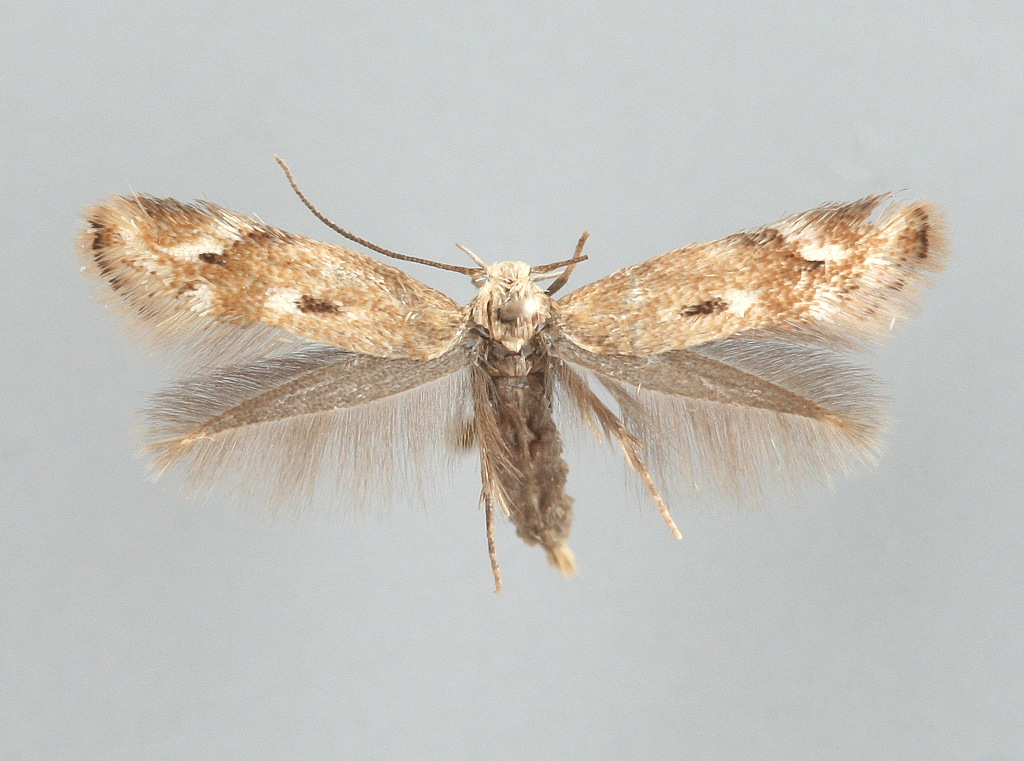
Adult female Elachista eleochariella specimen from Sonkajärvi (Finland)

tetragonella group

- Elachista abiskoella Bengtsson, 1977
- Elachista agilis Braun, 1921
- Elachista albidella
- Elachista biatomella (Stainton, 1848)
- Elachista bipunctella (Sinev & Sruoga, 1995)
- Elachista boursini Amsel, 1951
- Elachista christenseni Traugott-Olsen, 2000
- Elachista cinereopunctella (Haworth, 1828)
- Elachista cucullata Braun, 1921
- Elachista dimicatella Rebel, 1903
- Elachista eleochariella
- Elachista ensifera
- Elachista falirakiensis Traugott-Olsen, 2000
- Elachista fulgens Parenti, 1983 (tentatively placed here)
- Elachista glaserella Traugott-Olsen, 2000
- Elachista imatrella von Schantz, 1971
- Elachista jordanella Amsel, 1935
- Elachista juliensis Frey, 1870 = E. freyi Staudinger, 1871 (type of Biselachista)
- Elachista kebneella (Traugott-Olsen & Nielsen, 1977)
- Elachista kleini Amsel, 1935
- Elachista kobomugi Sugisima, 1999
- Elachista leucosticta Braun, 1948
- Elachista leucosyrma (Meyrick, 1932) (type of Platyphyllis)
- Elachista martinii Hofmann, [1898]
- Elachista nevadella Traugott-Olsen, 2000
- Elachista occidentalis Frey, 1882
- Elachista ornithopodella Frey, 1859
- Elachista pigerella (Herrich-Schäffer, 1854) (type of Atachia)
- Elachista quadripunctella (Hübner, [1825])
- Elachista ribentella Kaila & Varalda, 2004
- Elachista saarelai
- Elachista salinaris Braun, 1925
- Elachista scirpi Stainton, 1887
- Elachista serricornis
- Elachista spinigera (Sruoga, 1990)
- Elachista tetragonella (Herrich-Schäffer, 1855)
- Elachista trapeziella Stainton, 1849
- Elachista utonella Frey, 1856
- Elachista zabella Chrétien, 1908
- Elachista zonulae (Sruoga, 1992)
- Elachista cf. biatomella 'Ajat River'

Elachista (Elachista) incertae sedis

- Elachista absaroka Kaila, 1996
- Elachista adelpha Kaila & Jalava, 1994
- Elachista albicapilla Höfner, 1918
- Elachista albicapitella Engel, 1907
- Elachista albisquamella Zeller, 1877
- Elachista amideta Braun, 1948
- Elachista amseli (Parenti, 1981)
- Elachista anserinelloides Nel, 2003
- Elachista aphanta Turner, 1923
- Elachista archaeonoma Meyrick, 1889
- Elachista argentifasciella Höfner, 1898
- Elachista argentosa Braun, 1920
- Elachista arnoldi (Koster, 1993)
- Elachista beothucella Kaila, 1996
- Elachista bicingulella Sruoga, 1992
- Elachista bifurcatella (Sinev & Sruoga, 1995)
- Elachista bisetella Sinev & Sruoga, 1995
- Elachista brachyelythrifoliella Clemens, 1864
- Elachista brachyplectra Meyrick, 1921
- Elachista brachypterella (Klimesch, 1990)
- Elachista bromella Chretien, 1915
- Elachista caelebs Meyrick, 1933
- Elachista calusella Kaila, 1996
- Elachista cana Braun, 1920
- Elachista canariella Nielsen & Traugott-Olsen, 1987
- Elachista canis Parenti, 1983
- Elachista cerasella Kaila, 1996
- Elachista ciliigera Kaila, 1996
- Elachista colouratella Sinev & Sruoga, 1995
- Elachista confirmata Meyrick, 1931
- Elachista contaminatella Zeller, 1847
- Elachista cornutifera (Sruoga, 1995)
- Elachista dubitella Sinev & Sruoga, 1995
- Elachista devexella Kaila, 2003
- Elachista differens Parenti, 1978
- Elachista encumeadae Kaila & Karsholt, 2002
- Elachista ermolenkoi Sinev & Sruoga, 1995
- Elachista exaula Meyrick, 1889
- Elachista falaxella Sinev & Sruoga, 1995
- Elachista fuliginea Braun, 1948
- Elachista fumosella Sinev & Sruoga, 1995
- Elachista geminatella (Herrich-Schäffer, 1855)
- Elachista glenni Kaila, 1996
- Elachista grandiferella Sruoga, 1992
- Elachista griseella (Duponchel, 1843)
- Elachista griseola Diakonoff, 1955
- Elachista gruenewaldi Parenti, 2002
- Elachista helonoma Meyrick, 1889
- Elachista huron Kaila, 1996
- Elachista ibericella Traugott-Olsen, 1995
- Elachista igaloensis (Amsel, 1951)
- Elachista inaudita Braun, 1927
- Elachista irenae Buszko, 1989
- Elachista irrorata Braun, 1920
- Elachista japonica (Parenti, 1983)
- Elachista kaszabi Parenti, 1991
- Elachista kebneella (Traugott-Olsen, 1977)
- Elachista kopetdagica (Sruoga, 1990)
- Elachista kosteri Traugott-Olsen, 1995
- Elachista lambeseella Nielsen & Traugott-Olsen, 1987
- Elachista latebrella Sinev & Sruoga, 1995
- Elachista lenape Kaila, 1996
- Elachista leucofrons Braun, 1920
- Elachista maculosella Chrétien, 1896
- Elachista maritimella McDunnough, 1942
- Elachista megagnathos Sruoga, 1990
- Elachista metallica Parenti, 1981
- Elachista minuta (Parenti, 2003)
- Elachista mongolica Parenti, 1991
- Elachista morandinii Huemer & Kaila, 2003
- Elachista multidentella Sinev & Sruoga, 1995
- Elachista napaea Philpot, 1930
- Elachista nearcha Meyrick, 1910
- Elachista nigrothoracella Sinev & Sruoga, 1995
- Elachista nitidiuscula Braun, 1948
- Elachista olgae (Sinev, 1992)
- Elachista ombrodoca Meyrick, 1889
- Elachista opacella Sinev & Sruoga, 1995
- Elachista optatella Sinev & Sruoga, 1995
- Elachista orientella Sinev & Sruoga, 1995
- Elachista parasella Traugott-Olsen, 1974
- Elachista pelaena Kaila, 1996
- Elachista plagiaula (Meyrick, 1938)
- Elachista pravella (Sinev & Sruoga, 1995)
- Elachista pusillella (Sinev & Sruoga, 1995)
- Elachista putris Meyrick, 1923
- Elachista pyrrha Kaila, 1996
- Elachista radiantella Braun, 1922
- Elachista rufella Sinev & Sruoga, 1995
- Elachista sagittifera Philpott, 1927
- Elachista sagittiferella Sinev & Sruoga, 1995
- Elachista sasae Sinev & Sruoga, 1995
- Elachista serra Kaila, 1996
- Elachista sicula Parenti, 1978
- Elachista simplimorphella Sinev & Sruoga, 1995
- Elachista solitaria Braun, 1922
- Elachista staintonella Chamber, 1878
- Elachista stenopterella Rebel, 1932
- Elachista stramineola Braun, 1921
- Elachista strepens Meyrick, 1922
- Elachista sylvestris Braun, 1920
- Elachista tabghaella Amsel, 1935
- Elachista talgarella Kaila, 1992
- Elachista tersella (Sinev & Sruoga, 1995)
- Elachista thallophora Meyrick, 1889
- Elachista vakshi (Sruoga, 1992)
- Elachista vinlandica Kaila, 1996
- Elachista watti Philpott, 1924

=== Other groups ===
Some Elachista are divided into groups whose relationships to the two large subgenera requires further study, including:

"Dibrachia" group

- Elachista alicanta Kaila, 2005
- Elachista anatoliensis Traugott-Olsen, 1990
- Elachista elksourensis Kaila, 2005
- Elachista kalki Parenti, 1978 (type of Dibrachia)
- Elachista totalbella Chrétien, 1908

"Irenicodes" group

- Elachista eurychora (Meyrick, 1919) (type of Irenicodes)
- Elachista galatheae (Viette, 1954) (type of Euproteodes)
- Elachista holdgatei (Bradley, 1965)
- Elachista hookeri (Dugdale, 1971)
- Elachista pumila (Dugdale, 1971)

=== Incertae sedis ===
Additional Elachista species are of even more uncertain relationships than usual for this genus:

- Elachista baikalica Kaila, 1992
- Elachista bassii Parenti, 2006
- Elachista beltira Kaila, 2000
- Elachista beriga Kaila, 2000
- Elachista bimaculata Parenti, 1981
- Elachista brevis Sruoga & J. de Prins, 2009
- Elachista chelonitis Meyrick, 1909 (type of Cleroptila)
- Elachista cordata Sruoga & J. de Prins, 2011
- Elachista delocharis Meyrick, 1932
- Elachista densa Parenti, 1981
- Elachista deresyensis Traugott-Olsen, 1988
- Elachista donia Kaila, 2000
- Elachista gibbera Kaila, 2003
- Elachista gypsophila Meyrick, 1911
- Elachista iriphaea (Meyrick, 1932)
- Elachista justificata Meyrick, 1926
- Elachista kakamegensis Sruoga & J. de Prins, 2009
- Elachista kherana Kaila, 2000
- Elachista longispina Sruoga & J. de Prins, 2009
- Elachista maculosa Parenti, 1981
- Elachista merimnaea Meyrick, 1920
- Elachista mus Parenti, 1981
- Elachista oritropha Bradley, 1965
- Elachista planca Sruoga & J. de Prins, 2009
- Elachista pusilla Frey & Boll, 1876
- Elachista semnani Parenti, 1981
- Elachista semophanta Meyrick, 1914
- Elachista sparsula Meyrick, 1921
- Elachista stelviella Amsel, 1932
- Elachista trifasciata (E. Wollaston, 1879)
- Elachista vasrana Kaila, 2000
- Elachista veruta Kaila, 2008

=== Placement within Elachista uncertain ===
- Elachista angularis (Braun, 1918)
- Elachista cupreella Blanchard, 1852
- Elachista endobela Meyrick, 1926
- Elachista hilda (Meyrick, 1932)
- Elachista infamiliaris Gozmany, 1957
- Elachista ladiniella Hartig, 1938
- Elachista leucosoma Meyrick, 1922
- Elachista maculoscella Clemens, 1860
- Elachista melanura Meyrick, 1889
- Elachista metallifera Lower, 1908
- Elachista oxycrates Meyrick, 1932
- Elachista petalistis Meyrick, 1932
- Elachista picroleuca (Meyrick, 1921)
- Elachista rubella Blanchard, 1852
- Elachista texanica Frey & Boll, 1876
- Elachista vastata Meyrick, 1932

=== Excluded species ===
The following species are excluded from the genus Elachista, but have not yet been placed in another genus:

- Elachista arctodyta Meyrick, 1897
- Elachista argopis Meyrick, 1897
- Elachista cataptila Meyrick, 1897
- Elachista demogenes Meyrick, 1897
- Elachista parvipulvella Chambers 1875

== Former species ==
- Elachista arundinella (Duponchel, 1843)
- Elachista megerlella (Hubner, 1810)
- Elachista notosema (Meyrick, 1922)
- Elachista scythrodes (Turner, 1947)
- Elachista tersectella Zeller, 1875
- Elachista toropis Meyrick, 1897

== Synonyms ==
Invalid scientific names (junior synonyms and others) of Elachista in the circumscription as presented here are:

- Aphelosetia Stephens, 1834
- Aphigalia Dyar, [1903]
- Atachia Wocke in Heinemann, [1876]
- Atmozostis Meyrick, 1932
- Atrinia Sinev, 1992
- Biselachista Traugott-Olsen & Schmidt Nielsen, 1977
- Cleroptila Meyrick, 1909
- Cosmiotes Clemens, 1860
- Cycnodia Herrich-Schäffer, 1853
- Dibrachia Sinev & Sruoga, 1992
- Dicasteris Meyrick, 1906
- Dicranoctetes Braun, 1918
- Donacivola Busck, 1934
- Elachistoides Sruoga, 1992
- Elaschista (lapsus)
- Euproteodes Viette, 1954
- Eupneusta Bradley, 1974
- Hecista Wallengren, 1881
- Hemiprosopa Braun, 1948
- Illantis Meyrick, 1921
- Irenicodes Meyrick, 1919
- Neaera Chambers, 1880 (non Robineau-Desvoidy, 1830: preoccupied)
- Paraperittia Rebel, 1916
- Phigalia Chambers, 1875 (non Duponchel, 1829: preoccupied)
- Platyphyllis Meyrick, 1932
- Ptilodoxa Meyrick, 1921
- Svenssonia Parenti, 2009
