= E. amseli =

E. amseli may refer to:

- Edosa amseli, a fungus moth
- Elachista amseli, a grass-miner moth
- Emmelina amseli, a plume moth
- Euclasta amseli, a grass moth
