= Elachista gerasimovi =

Scientific classification
- Kingdom: Animalia
- Phylum: Arthropoda
- Clade: Pancrustacea
- Class: Insecta
- Order: Lepidoptera
- Family: Elachistidae
- Genus: Elachista
- Species: E. gerasimovi

Binomial name
- Elachista gerasimovi Sruoga, 2000

Species of moth

Elachista gerasimovi is a moth of the family Elachistidae that is endemic to Uzbekistan.

The wingspan is 9 millimetres (0.35 in) for females.
