= Elachista mongolica =

Scientific classification
- Domain: Eukaryota
- Kingdom: Animalia
- Phylum: Arthropoda
- Class: Insecta
- Order: Lepidoptera
- Family: Elachistidae
- Genus: Elachista
- Species: E. mongolica

Binomial name
- Elachista mongolica Parenti, 1991

Species of moth

Elachista mongolica is a moth in the family Elachistidae. It was described by Parenti in 1991. It is found in Mongolia.
