= Elachista deficiens =

Scientific classification
- Kingdom: Animalia
- Phylum: Arthropoda
- Class: Insecta
- Order: Lepidoptera
- Family: Elachistidae
- Genus: Elachista
- Species: E. deficiens

Binomial name
- Elachista deficiens Meyrick, 1922

Species of moth

Elachista deficiens is a moth in the family Elachistidae. It was described by Edward Meyrick in 1922. It is found in Sri Lanka.

The wingspan is about 7.7 mm.
