= Elachista nipponicella =

Scientific classification
- Kingdom: Animalia
- Phylum: Arthropoda
- Class: Insecta
- Order: Lepidoptera
- Family: Elachistidae
- Genus: Elachista
- Species: E. nipponicella

Binomial name
- Elachista nipponicella Sugisima, 2006

Species of moth

Elachista nipponicella is a moth of the family Elachistidae that is found in Japan.
