= Elachista heteroplaca =

Scientific classification
- Kingdom: Animalia
- Phylum: Arthropoda
- Class: Insecta
- Order: Lepidoptera
- Family: Elachistidae
- Genus: Elachista
- Species: E. heteroplaca

Binomial name
- Elachista heteroplaca Meyrick, 1934

Species of moth

Elachista heteroplaca is a moth in the family Elachistidae. It was described by Edward Meyrick in 1934. It is found in India.
