= Elachista nearcha =

Scientific classification
- Kingdom: Animalia
- Phylum: Arthropoda
- Class: Insecta
- Order: Lepidoptera
- Family: Elachistidae
- Genus: Elachista
- Species: E. nearcha

Binomial name
- Elachista nearcha Meyrick, 1910

Species of moth

Elachista nearcha is a moth in the family Elachistidae. It was described by Edward Meyrick in 1910. It is found in southern India.

The wingspan is 8–9 mm. The forewings are white. The plical stigma is represented by a thick elongate black mark. The second discal stigma by a short fine black dash. There is also an oblique fascia of brownish irroration crossing the before the second discal stigma, and a less marked inwardly oblique fascia from the costal extremity of this across the plical stigma to the dorsum. There is an apical patch of brownish irroration. The hindwings are dark grey.
