= Elachista confirmata =

Scientific classification
- Kingdom: Animalia
- Phylum: Arthropoda
- Class: Insecta
- Order: Lepidoptera
- Family: Elachistidae
- Genus: Elachista
- Species: E. confirmata

Binomial name
- Elachista confirmata Meyrick, 1931

Species of moth

Elachista confirmata is a moth in the family Elachistidae. It was described by Edward Meyrick in 1931. It is found in southern India.
