= Elachista gypsophila =

Scientific classification
- Kingdom: Animalia
- Phylum: Arthropoda
- Class: Insecta
- Order: Lepidoptera
- Family: Elachistidae
- Genus: Elachista
- Species: E. gypsophila

Binomial name
- Elachista gypsophila Meyrick, 1911

Species of moth

Elachista gypsophila is a moth of the family Elachistidae. It is found in South Africa.
