= Elachista leucosoma =

Scientific classification
- Kingdom: Animalia
- Phylum: Arthropoda
- Class: Insecta
- Order: Lepidoptera
- Family: Elachistidae
- Genus: Elachista
- Species: E. leucosoma

Binomial name
- Elachista leucosoma Meyrick, 1922

Species of moth

Elachista leucosoma is a moth in the family Elachistidae. It was described by Edward Meyrick in 1922. It is found in India (Punjab).

The wingspan is about 7 mm. The forewings are light grey, irrorated with dark grey. The hindwings are grey.
