= Elachista stelviella =

Scientific classification
- Domain: Eukaryota
- Kingdom: Animalia
- Phylum: Arthropoda
- Class: Insecta
- Order: Lepidoptera
- Family: Elachistidae
- Genus: Elachista
- Species: E. stelviella

Binomial name
- Elachista stelviella Amsel, 1932

Species of moth

Elachista stelviella is a moth in the family Elachistidae. It was described by Hans Georg Amsel in 1932. It is found in South Tyrol, Italy.
