= Elachista leucosyrma =

Scientific classification
- Kingdom: Animalia
- Phylum: Arthropoda
- Class: Insecta
- Order: Lepidoptera
- Family: Elachistidae
- Genus: Elachista
- Species: E. leucosyrma

Binomial name
- Elachista leucosyrma (Meyrick, 1932)

Synonyms
- Platyphyllis leucosyrma Meyrick, 1932

Species of moth

Elachista leucosyrma is a moth in the family Elachistidae. It was described by Edward Meyrick in 1932. It is found in India.
