= Elachista amideta =

Scientific classification
- Domain: Eukaryota
- Kingdom: Animalia
- Phylum: Arthropoda
- Class: Insecta
- Order: Lepidoptera
- Family: Elachistidae
- Genus: Elachista
- Species: E. amideta

Binomial name
- Elachista amideta Braun, 1948

Species of moth

Elachista amideta is a moth of the family Elachistidae. It is found in Canada, where it has been recorded from Ontario.

The wingspan is about 9.2 mm.
