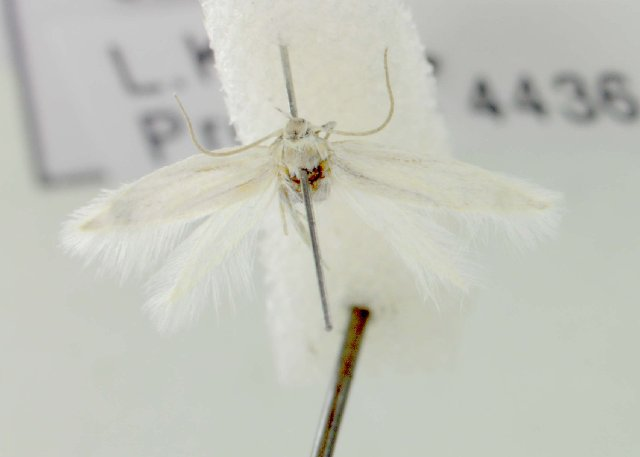

Scientific classification
- Kingdom: Animalia
- Phylum: Arthropoda
- Class: Insecta
- Order: Lepidoptera
- Family: Elachistidae
- Genus: Elachista
- Species: E. rutjani

Binomial name
- Elachista rutjani Kaila, 2011

= Elachista rutjani =

Species of moth

Elachista rutjani is a moth in the family Elachistidae. It was described by Lauri Kaila in 2011. It is found in Russia, where it has been recorded from the southern Ural and the Lower Volga region. It is also found in Ukraine. The habitat consists of limestone steppes.
