= Elachista longispina =

Scientific classification
- Kingdom: Animalia
- Phylum: Arthropoda
- Clade: Pancrustacea
- Class: Insecta
- Order: Lepidoptera
- Family: Elachistidae
- Genus: Elachista
- Species: E. longispina

Binomial name
- Elachista longispina Sruoga & De Prins, 2009

Species of moth

Elachista longispina is a moth of the family Elachistidae that is endemic to Kenya.

The wingspan is about 8.6 mm.

== Etymology ==
The species name refers to the long, spinose cornuti present in the male phallus and is derived from Latin longus (meaning long) and spina (meaning spine).
