= Elachista ievae =

Scientific classification
- Kingdom: Animalia
- Phylum: Arthropoda
- Clade: Pancrustacea
- Class: Insecta
- Order: Lepidoptera
- Family: Elachistidae
- Genus: Elachista
- Species: E. ievae

Binomial name
- Elachista ievae Sruoga, 2008

Species of moth

Elachista ievae is a moth in the family Elachistidae. It was described by Sruoga in 2008. It is found in Nepal. The habitat consists of mixed primary forests.

The wingspan is about 8.7 mm. The forewings are blackish brown. The hindwings are dark brown.

== Etymology ==
The species is named after the daughter of the author, Ieva.
