= Elachista inscia =

Scientific classification
- Kingdom: Animalia
- Phylum: Arthropoda
- Class: Insecta
- Order: Lepidoptera
- Family: Elachistidae
- Genus: Elachista
- Species: E. inscia

Binomial name
- Elachista inscia (Meyrick, 1913)

Synonyms
- Mendesia inscia Meyrick, 1913

Species of moth

Elachista inscia is a moth of the family Elachistidae. It is found in South Africa.
