= Elachista obtusella =

Scientific classification
- Kingdom: Animalia
- Phylum: Arthropoda
- Clade: Pancrustacea
- Class: Insecta
- Order: Lepidoptera
- Family: Elachistidae
- Genus: Elachista
- Species: E. obtusella

Binomial name
- Elachista obtusella Sruoga, 2008

Species of moth

Elachista obtusella is a moth in the family Elachistidae. It was described by Sruoga in 2008. It is found in Nepal. The habitat consists of pine forests.

The wingspan is about 7.2 mm. Adults have been recorded on wing in early March.
