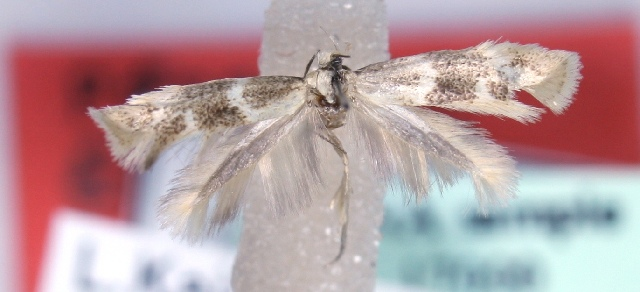

Scientific classification
- Kingdom: Animalia
- Phylum: Arthropoda
- Class: Insecta
- Order: Lepidoptera
- Family: Elachistidae
- Genus: Elachista
- Species: E. versicolora

Binomial name
- Elachista versicolora Kaila, 2007

= Elachista versicolora =

Species of moth

Elachista versicolora is a moth of the family Elachistidae. It is found in Transbaikal, Russia.

The length of the forewings is 4.5–5.2 mm.
