= Elachista purella =

Scientific classification
- Kingdom: Animalia
- Phylum: Arthropoda
- Clade: Pancrustacea
- Class: Insecta
- Order: Lepidoptera
- Family: Elachistidae
- Genus: Elachista
- Species: E. purella

Binomial name
- Elachista purella Sruoga, 2000

Species of moth

Elachista purella is a moth of the family Elachistidae. It is found in Ukraine.
