= Elachista planca =

Scientific classification
- Kingdom: Animalia
- Phylum: Arthropoda
- Clade: Pancrustacea
- Class: Insecta
- Order: Lepidoptera
- Family: Elachistidae
- Genus: Elachista
- Species: E. planca

Binomial name
- Elachista planca Sruoga & De Prins, 2009

Species of moth

Elachista planca is a moth of the family Elachistidae that is endemic to Kenya.

The wingspan is about 9.6 mm (0.38 in).
