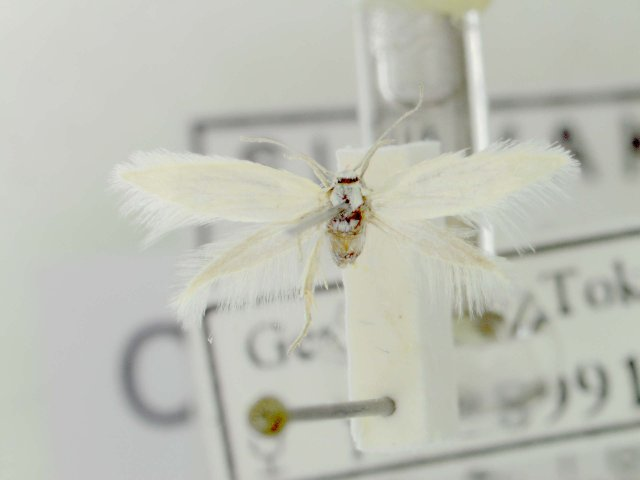

Scientific classification
- Kingdom: Animalia
- Phylum: Arthropoda
- Class: Insecta
- Order: Lepidoptera
- Family: Elachistidae
- Genus: Elachista
- Species: E. liskai

Binomial name
- Elachista liskai Kaila, 2011

= Elachista liskai =

Species of moth

Elachista liskai is a moth of the family Elachistidae. It is found in Slovakia.

The wingspan is 9–11 millimetres (0.35–0.43 in) for males and 8.5–10.5 millimetres (0.33–0.41 in) for females.
