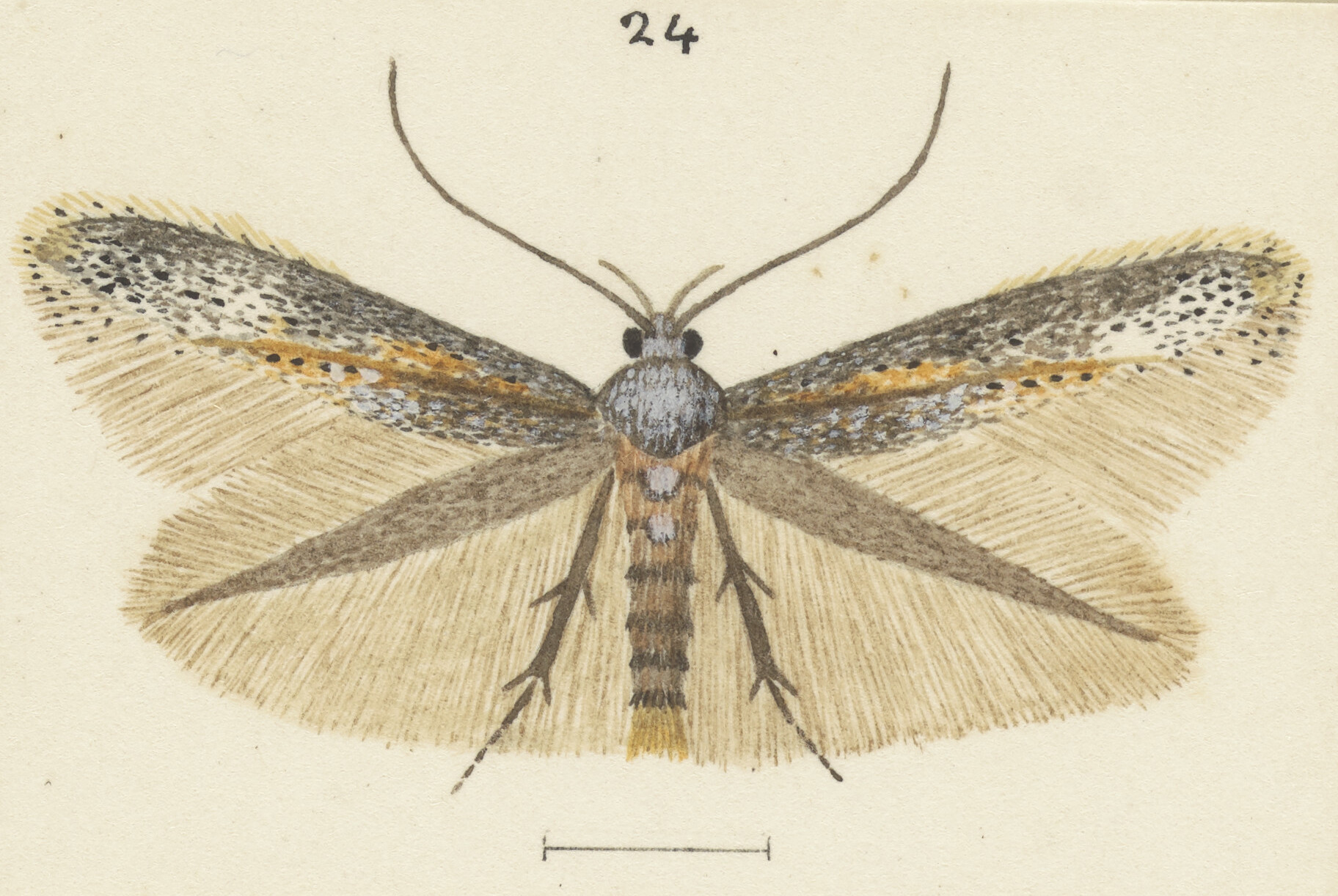
- Illustration of male

Scientific classification
- Kingdom: Animalia
- Phylum: Arthropoda
- Class: Insecta
- Order: Lepidoptera
- Family: Elachistidae
- Genus: Elachista
- Species: E. napaea

Binomial name
- Elachista napaea Philpott, 1930

= Elachista napaea =

Species of moth

Elachista napaea is a moth in the family Elachistidae. It was described by Philpott in 1930. It is found in New Zealand.

The wingspan is 9–10 mm. Head and thorax grey. The forewings are whitish-grey. The hindwings are fuscous-grey.
