= Elachista multipunctata =

Scientific classification
- Kingdom: Animalia
- Phylum: Arthropoda
- Clade: Pancrustacea
- Class: Insecta
- Order: Lepidoptera
- Family: Elachistidae
- Genus: Elachista
- Species: E. multipunctata

Binomial name
- Elachista multipunctata Sruoga, 1990

Species of moth

Elachista multipunctata is a moth of the family Elachistidae. It is found in Tajikistan.

The length of the forewings is about 3.4 mm. The ground colour of the forewings is white, strongly mottled with brown tipped scales. The hindwings are white. Adults have been recorded in August.
