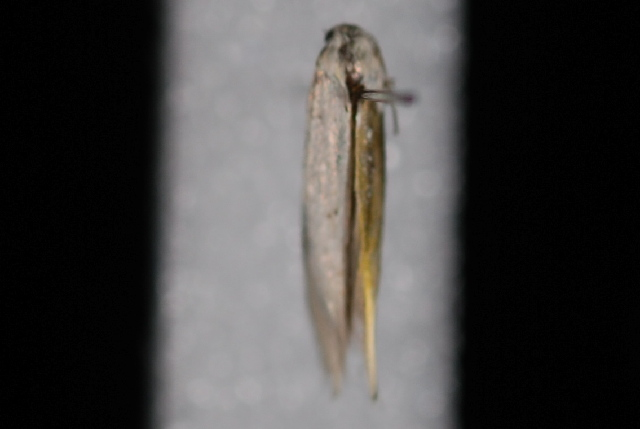

Scientific classification
- Domain: Eukaryota
- Kingdom: Animalia
- Phylum: Arthropoda
- Class: Insecta
- Order: Lepidoptera
- Family: Elachistidae
- Genus: Elachista
- Species: E. cana

Binomial name
- Elachista cana Braun, 1920

= Elachista cana =

Species of moth

Elachista cana is a moth of the family Elachistidae. It is found in North America, where it has been recorded from Arizona, Colorado and Alberta.

The wingspan is 8.5-9.5 mm. Adults have been recorded on wing in June.
