= Elachista afghana =

Scientific classification
- Domain: Eukaryota
- Kingdom: Animalia
- Phylum: Arthropoda
- Class: Insecta
- Order: Lepidoptera
- Family: Elachistidae
- Genus: Elachista
- Species: E. afghana

Binomial name
- Elachista afghana Parenti, 1981

Species of moth

Elachista afghana is a moth in the family Elachistidae, found in Afghanistan. It was described by Parenti in 1981.
