= Elachista picroleuca =

Scientific classification
- Kingdom: Animalia
- Phylum: Arthropoda
- Class: Insecta
- Order: Lepidoptera
- Family: Elachistidae
- Genus: Elachista
- Species: E. picroleuca

Binomial name
- Elachista picroleuca (Meyrick, 1921)

Synonyms
- Illantis picroleuca Meyrick, 1921

Species of moth

Elachista picroleuca is a moth in the family Elachistidae. It was described by Edward Meyrick in 1921. It is found on Java.

The wingspan is about 8 mm. The forewings are purplish-grey, irrorated with blackish, more strongly blackish towards the margins of an oblique-triangular white spot on the costa at three-fourths. The hindwings are dark grey.
