= Elachista strepens =

Scientific classification
- Kingdom: Animalia
- Phylum: Arthropoda
- Class: Insecta
- Order: Lepidoptera
- Family: Elachistidae
- Genus: Elachista
- Species: E. strepens

Binomial name
- Elachista strepens Meyrick, 1922

Species of moth

Elachista strepens is a moth in the family Elachistidae. It was described by Edward Meyrick in 1922. It is found in India (Assam).

The wingspan is about 5 mm. The forewings are dark ashy-fuscous with a cloudy whitish dot on the costa at two-fifths and one at four-fifths. There are several white terminal specks. The hindwings are dark grey.
