= Elachista kherana =

Scientific classification
- Kingdom: Animalia
- Phylum: Arthropoda
- Class: Insecta
- Order: Lepidoptera
- Family: Elachistidae
- Genus: Elachista
- Species: E. kherana

Binomial name
- Elachista kherana Kaila, 2000

Species of moth

Elachista kherana is a moth in the family Elachistidae. It was described by Lauri Kaila in 2000. It is found in Argentina.
