= Elachista vastata =

Scientific classification
- Domain: Eukaryota
- Kingdom: Animalia
- Phylum: Arthropoda
- Class: Insecta
- Order: Lepidoptera
- Family: Elachistidae
- Genus: Elachista
- Species: E. vastata

Binomial name
- Elachista vastata Meyrick, 1932

Species of moth

Elachista vastata is a moth in the family Elachistidae. It was described by Edward Meyrick in 1932. It is found in India.
