= Elachista holdgatei =

Scientific classification
- Domain: Eukaryota
- Kingdom: Animalia
- Phylum: Arthropoda
- Class: Insecta
- Order: Lepidoptera
- Family: Elachistidae
- Genus: Elachista
- Species: E. holdgatei

Binomial name
- Elachista holdgatei (Bradley, 1965)

Synonyms
- Euproteodes holdgatei Bradley, 1965

Species of moth

Elachista holdgatei is a moth in the family Elachistidae. It was described by John David Bradley in 1965. It is found on the Falkland Islands.
