= Elachista kabuli =

Scientific classification
- Domain: Eukaryota
- Kingdom: Animalia
- Phylum: Arthropoda
- Class: Insecta
- Order: Lepidoptera
- Family: Elachistidae
- Genus: Elachista
- Species: E. kabuli

Binomial name
- Elachista kabuli Parenti, 1981

Species of moth

Elachista kabuli is a moth in the family Elachistidae. It was described by Parenti in 1981. It is found in Afghanistan.
