= Elachista bicingulella =

Scientific classification
- Kingdom: Animalia
- Phylum: Arthropoda
- Clade: Pancrustacea
- Class: Insecta
- Order: Lepidoptera
- Family: Elachistidae
- Genus: Elachista
- Species: E. bicingulella

Binomial name
- Elachista bicingulella Sruoga, 1992

Species of moth

Elachista bicingulella is a moth in the family Elachistidae. It was described by Sruoga in 1992. It is found in Central Asia.
