= Elachista nigrothoracella =

Scientific classification
- Kingdom: Animalia
- Phylum: Arthropoda
- Clade: Pancrustacea
- Class: Insecta
- Order: Lepidoptera
- Family: Elachistidae
- Genus: Elachista
- Species: E. nigrothoracella

Binomial name
- Elachista nigrothoracella Sinev & Sruoga, 1995

Species of moth

Elachista nigrothoracella is a moth in the family Elachistidae. It was described by Sinev and Sruoga in 1995. It is found in south-eastern Siberia and Sakhalin.
