= Elachista wieseriella =

Scientific classification
- Kingdom: Animalia
- Phylum: Arthropoda
- Clade: Pancrustacea
- Class: Insecta
- Order: Lepidoptera
- Family: Elachistidae
- Genus: Elachista
- Species: E. wieseriella

Binomial name
- Elachista wieseriella Huemer, 2000

Species of moth

Elachista wieseriella is a moth of the family Elachistidae which is endemic to Austria.

The wingspan is 10.4–11.5 millimetres (0.41–0.45 in) for males and 10.1–10.8 millimetres (0.40–0.43 in) for females.

== Etymology ==
The species is named in honour of Dr. Christian Wieser.
