= Elachista patriodoxa =

Scientific classification
- Kingdom: Animalia
- Phylum: Arthropoda
- Class: Insecta
- Order: Lepidoptera
- Family: Elachistidae
- Genus: Elachista
- Species: E. patriodoxa

Binomial name
- Elachista patriodoxa Meyrick, 1932

Species of moth

Elachista patriodoxa is a moth of the family Elachistidae. It is found in North America in Ontario and New Hampshire.
