= Elachista albrechti =

Scientific classification
- Domain: Eukaryota
- Kingdom: Animalia
- Phylum: Arthropoda
- Class: Insecta
- Order: Lepidoptera
- Family: Elachistidae
- Genus: Elachista
- Species: E. albrechti

Binomial name
- Elachista albrechti Kaila, 1998

Species of moth

Elachista albrechti is a moth in the family Elachistidae. It was described by Lauri Kaila in 1998. It is found in Nepal.
