= Elachista fucosa =

Scientific classification
- Kingdom: Animalia
- Phylum: Arthropoda
- Clade: Pancrustacea
- Class: Insecta
- Order: Lepidoptera
- Family: Elachistidae
- Genus: Elachista
- Species: E. fucosa

Binomial name
- Elachista fucosa Meyrick, 1922

Species of moth

Elachista fucosa is a moth of the family Elachistidae. It is found in the dry interior areas of Queensland, New South Wales, South Australia and Western Australia.

The wingspan is 6.4–9 millimetres (0.25–0.35 in).
