= Elachista bassii =

Scientific classification
- Domain: Eukaryota
- Kingdom: Animalia
- Phylum: Arthropoda
- Class: Insecta
- Order: Lepidoptera
- Family: Elachistidae
- Genus: Elachista
- Species: E. bassii

Binomial name
- Elachista bassii Parenti, 2006

Species of moth

Elachista bassii is a moth of the family Elachistidae that is found in the north of Nepal.

The wingspan is 5–5.5 millimetres (0.20–0.22 in) for males. The females are brachypterous.
