= Elachista stichospora =

Scientific classification
- Kingdom: Animalia
- Phylum: Arthropoda
- Class: Insecta
- Order: Lepidoptera
- Family: Elachistidae
- Genus: Elachista
- Species: E. stichospora

Binomial name
- Elachista stichospora Meyrick, 1932

Species of moth

Elachista stichospora is a moth in the family Elachistidae. It was described by Edward Meyrick in 1932. It is found in India.

The wingspan measures approximately 7.6 mm. The forewings are grayish-brown, and the hindwings are dark brown.
