= Elachista curonensis =

Scientific classification
- Kingdom: Animalia
- Phylum: Arthropoda
- Clade: Pancrustacea
- Class: Insecta
- Order: Lepidoptera
- Family: Elachistidae
- Genus: Elachista
- Species: E. curonensis

Binomial name
- Elachista curonensis Traugott-Olsen, 1990

Species of moth

Elachista curonensis is a moth of the family Elachistidae. It is found in Italy.
