= Elachista tuberella =

Scientific classification
- Kingdom: Animalia
- Phylum: Arthropoda
- Clade: Pancrustacea
- Class: Insecta
- Order: Lepidoptera
- Family: Elachistidae
- Genus: Elachista
- Species: E. tuberella

Binomial name
- Elachista tuberella Sruoga, 2008

Species of moth

Elachista tuberella is a moth in the family Elachistidae. It was described by Sruoga in 2008. It is found in Nepal. The habitat consists of mixed secondary scrub and pine forests.
