= Elachista justificata =

Scientific classification
- Kingdom: Animalia
- Phylum: Arthropoda
- Class: Insecta
- Order: Lepidoptera
- Family: Elachistidae
- Genus: Elachista
- Species: E. justificata

Binomial name
- Elachista justificata Meyrick, 1926

Species of moth

Elachista justificata is a moth of the family Elachistidae that is found in South Africa.
