= Elachista cretula =

Scientific classification
- Kingdom: Animalia
- Phylum: Arthropoda
- Class: Insecta
- Order: Lepidoptera
- Family: Elachistidae
- Genus: Elachista
- Species: E. cretula

Binomial name
- Elachista cretula Kaila, 2011

Species of moth

Elachista cretula is a moth species in the family Elachistidae. It was described by Lauri Kaila in 2011. It is found in Kazakhstan and Turkmenistan.

The wingspan is 10.5–11.5 mm.
