= Elachista moroccoensis =

Scientific classification
- Kingdom: Animalia
- Phylum: Arthropoda
- Class: Insecta
- Order: Lepidoptera
- Family: Elachistidae
- Genus: Elachista
- Species: E. moroccoensis

Binomial name
- Elachista moroccoensis Traugott-Olsen, 1992

Species of moth

Elachista moroccoensis is a moth in the family Elachistidae. It was described by Traugott-Olsen in 1992. It is found in Morocco.
