= Elachista spinigera =

Scientific classification
- Kingdom: Animalia
- Phylum: Arthropoda
- Clade: Pancrustacea
- Class: Insecta
- Order: Lepidoptera
- Family: Elachistidae
- Genus: Elachista
- Species: E. spinigera

Binomial name
- Elachista spinigera (Sruoga, 1990)

Synonyms
- Biselachista spinigera Sruoga, 1990

Species of moth

Elachista spinigera is a moth of the family Elachistidae. It is found in Turkmenistan.

The length of the forewings is about 3.7 mm. Adults have been recorded in August.
