= Elachista gilvula =

Scientific classification
- Kingdom: Animalia
- Phylum: Arthropoda
- Class: Insecta
- Order: Lepidoptera
- Family: Elachistidae
- Genus: Elachista
- Species: E. gilvula

Binomial name
- Elachista gilvula Kaila, 2012

Species of moth

Elachista gilvula is a moth of the family Elachistidae. It is found in Kazakhstan and Russia (Tuva). The habitat consists of xerothermic nanophyton steppes.

The wingspan is 8.5–9.5 mm.
