= Elachista filicornella =

Scientific classification
- Kingdom: Animalia
- Phylum: Arthropoda
- Class: Insecta
- Order: Lepidoptera
- Family: Elachistidae
- Genus: Elachista
- Species: E. filicornella

Binomial name
- Elachista filicornella Kaila, 1992

Species of moth

Elachista filicornella is a moth of the family Elachistidae. It is found in southern Kazakhstan.
