= Elachista ilicrina =

Scientific classification
- Domain: Eukaryota
- Kingdom: Animalia
- Phylum: Arthropoda
- Class: Insecta
- Order: Lepidoptera
- Family: Elachistidae
- Genus: Elachista
- Species: E. ilicrina

Binomial name
- Elachista ilicrina Falkovitsh, 1896

Species of moth

Elachista ilicrina is a moth in the family Elachistidae. It was described by Mark I. Falkovitsh in 1896. It is found in Uzbekistan.

The wingspan is about 9 mm. The forewings are pure white and the hindwings are nearly white. Its head is unicolorous creamy white.
