= Elachista metallifera =

Scientific classification
- Domain: Eukaryota
- Kingdom: Animalia
- Phylum: Arthropoda
- Class: Insecta
- Order: Lepidoptera
- Family: Elachistidae
- Genus: Elachista
- Species: E. metallifera

Binomial name
- Elachista metallifera Lower, 1908

Species of moth

Elachista metallifera is a moth in the family Elachistidae. It was described by Oswald Bertram Lower in 1908. It is found in Australia, where it has been recorded from Queensland.

== Taxonomy ==
The name metallifera is preoccupied by Mompha metallifera, described by Lord Walsingham in 1882. The identity of this species is uncertain, because the holotype is lost.
