= Elachista lorigera =

Scientific classification
- Kingdom: Animalia
- Phylum: Arthropoda
- Class: Insecta
- Order: Lepidoptera
- Family: Elachistidae
- Genus: Elachista
- Species: E. lorigera

Binomial name
- Elachista lorigera (Meyrick, 1921)

Synonyms
- Ptilodoxa lorigera Meyrick, 1921

Species of moth

Elachista lorigera is a moth in the family Elachistidae. It was described by Edward Meyrick in 1921. It is found on Java.

The wingspan is about six millimetres (0.24 in). The forewings are dark fuscous, speckled with whitish on the basal half and towards the dorsum. There is a large dark fuscous tuft towards the dorsum before the middle and an oblique ochreous-white streak from the costa before the middle reaching half across the wing, between this and the base is some whitish suffusion towards the costa and there is an irregular-edged ochreous-white streak from 2/3 of the costa to just below the apex, broadened anteriorly by an extension over the cilia. The hindwings are dark grey.
