= Elachista brevis =

Scientific classification
- Kingdom: Animalia
- Phylum: Arthropoda
- Clade: Pancrustacea
- Class: Insecta
- Order: Lepidoptera
- Family: Elachistidae
- Genus: Elachista
- Species: E. brevis

Binomial name
- Elachista brevis Sruoga & De Prins, 2009

Species of moth

Elachista brevis is a moth of the family Elachistidae that is endemic to Kenya.

The wingspan is about 7.3 mm.

== Etymology ==
The species name refers to the short distal spine of the sacculus and is derived from Latin brevis (meaning short).
