= Elachista vakshi =

Scientific classification
- Kingdom: Animalia
- Phylum: Arthropoda
- Clade: Pancrustacea
- Class: Insecta
- Order: Lepidoptera
- Family: Elachistidae
- Genus: Elachista
- Species: E. vakshi

Binomial name
- Elachista vakshi (Sruoga, 1992)

Synonyms
- Cosmiotes vakshi Sruoga, 1992

Species of moth

Elachista vakshi is a moth in the family Elachistidae. It was described by Sruoga in 1992. It is found in Central Asia.
