= Elachista endobela =

Scientific classification
- Kingdom: Animalia
- Phylum: Arthropoda
- Class: Insecta
- Order: Lepidoptera
- Family: Elachistidae
- Genus: Elachista
- Species: E. endobela

Binomial name
- Elachista endobela Meyrick, 1926

Species of moth

Elachista endobela is a moth in the family Elachistidae. It was described by Edward Meyrick in 1926. It is found in southern India.

The wingspan is about 7 mm.
