= Elachista infamiliaris =

Scientific classification
- Kingdom: Animalia
- Phylum: Arthropoda
- Clade: Pancrustacea
- Class: Insecta
- Order: Lepidoptera
- Family: Elachistidae
- Genus: Elachista
- Species: E. infamiliaris

Binomial name
- Elachista infamiliaris Gozmány, 1957

Species of moth

Elachista infamiliaris is a moth in the family Elachistidae. It was described by László Anthony Gozmány in 1957. It is found in Hungary.
