= Elachista esmeralda =

Scientific classification
- Kingdom: Animalia
- Phylum: Arthropoda
- Class: Insecta
- Order: Lepidoptera
- Family: Elachistidae
- Genus: Elachista
- Species: E. esmeralda

Binomial name
- Elachista esmeralda Kaila, 1992

Species of moth

Elachista esmeralda is a moth in the family Elachistidae. It was described by Lauri Kaila in 1992. It is found in southern Kazakhstan.
