= Elachista semophanta =

Scientific classification
- Kingdom: Animalia
- Phylum: Arthropoda
- Class: Insecta
- Order: Lepidoptera
- Family: Elachistidae
- Genus: Elachista
- Species: E. semophanta

Binomial name
- Elachista semophanta Meyrick, 1914

Species of moth

Elachista semophanta is a moth of the family Elachistidae that is endemic to Malawi.
