= Elachista ozeini =

Scientific classification
- Kingdom: Animalia
- Phylum: Arthropoda
- Clade: Pancrustacea
- Class: Insecta
- Order: Lepidoptera
- Family: Elachistidae
- Genus: Elachista
- Species: E. ozeini

Binomial name
- Elachista ozeini Parenti, 2004

Species of moth

Elachista ozeini is a moth of the family Elachistidae that is endemic to Italy.
