= Elachista griseola =

Scientific classification
- Domain: Eukaryota
- Kingdom: Animalia
- Phylum: Arthropoda
- Class: Insecta
- Order: Lepidoptera
- Family: Elachistidae
- Genus: Elachista
- Species: E. griseola

Binomial name
- Elachista griseola Diakonoff, 1955

Species of moth

Elachista griseola is a moth in the family Elachistidae. It was described by Alexey Diakonoff in 1955. It is found in New Guinea.
