= Elachista leucastra =

Scientific classification
- Kingdom: Animalia
- Phylum: Arthropoda
- Class: Insecta
- Order: Lepidoptera
- Family: Elachistidae
- Genus: Elachista
- Species: E. leucastra

Binomial name
- Elachista leucastra (Meyrick, 1906)

Synonyms
- Dicasteris leucastra Meyrick, 1906

Species of moth

Elachista leucastra is a moth of the family Elachistidae. It is found in Tasmania, Australia.

The wingspan is about 12 mm. The forewings and hindwings are dark grey.
