= Elachista dorinda =

Scientific classification
- Kingdom: Animalia
- Phylum: Arthropoda
- Class: Insecta
- Order: Lepidoptera
- Family: Elachistidae
- Genus: Elachista
- Species: E. dorinda

Binomial name
- Elachista dorinda Kaila, 2007

Species of moth

Elachista dorinda is a moth of the family Elachistidae. It is found in Turkey.

The length of the forewings is 3.7–4.5 mm.
