= Elachista totalbella =

Scientific classification
- Kingdom: Animalia
- Phylum: Arthropoda
- Clade: Pancrustacea
- Class: Insecta
- Order: Lepidoptera
- Family: Elachistidae
- Genus: Elachista
- Species: E. totalbella

Binomial name
- Elachista totalbella Chrétien, 1908

Synonyms
- Dibrachia totalbella

Species of moth

Elachista totalbella is a moth of the family Elachistidae. It is found in Algeria and Tunisia.

The forewing length is 5.2 mm (0.20 in) for males.
