= Elachista caelebs =

Scientific classification
- Kingdom: Animalia
- Phylum: Arthropoda
- Class: Insecta
- Order: Lepidoptera
- Family: Elachistidae
- Genus: Elachista
- Species: E. caelebs

Binomial name
- Elachista caelebs Meyrick, 1933

Species of moth

Elachista caelebs is a moth in the family Elachistidae. It was described by Edward Meyrick in 1933. It is found in Kashmir.
