= Elachista sparsula =

Scientific classification
- Kingdom: Animalia
- Phylum: Arthropoda
- Class: Insecta
- Order: Lepidoptera
- Family: Elachistidae
- Genus: Elachista
- Species: E. sparsula

Binomial name
- Elachista sparsula Meyrick, 1921

Species of moth

Elachista sparsula is a moth of the family Elachistidae. It is found in South Africa.

The wingspan is about 7 mm. The forewings are white, more or less thinly speckled with fuscous or dark fuscous, the plical and second discal stigmata represented by short linear marks of similar dark scales. There are oblique short linear marks of similar scales at the apex and tornus more or less indicated. The hindwings are grey.
