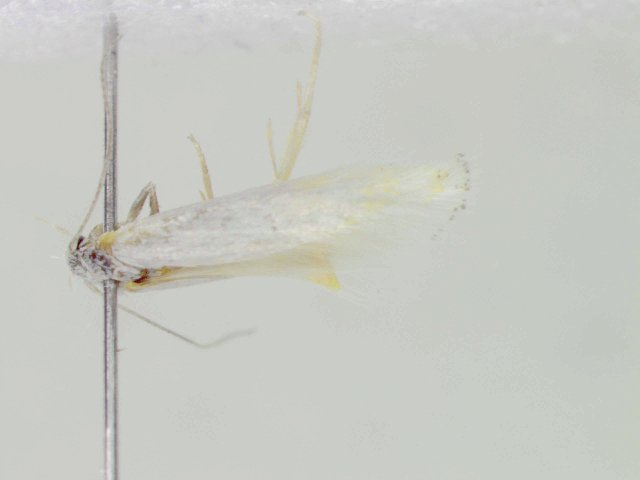

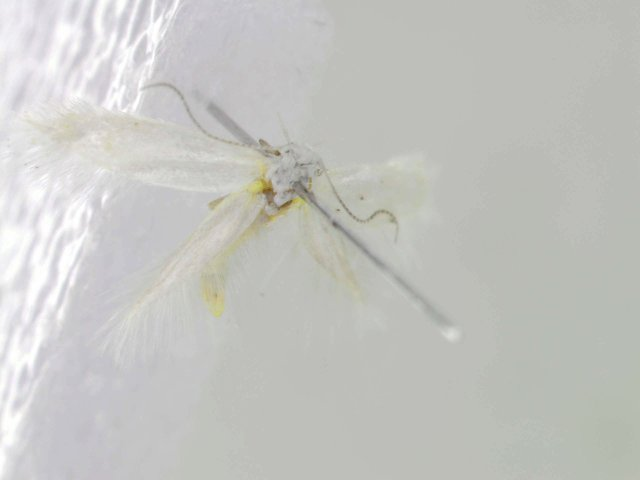

Scientific classification
- Domain: Eukaryota
- Kingdom: Animalia
- Phylum: Arthropoda
- Class: Insecta
- Order: Lepidoptera
- Family: Elachistidae
- Genus: Elachista
- Species: E. nevadensis

Binomial name
- Elachista nevadensis Parenti, 1978

= Elachista nevadensis =

Species of moth

Elachista nevadensis is a moth of the family Elachistidae. It is found in Spain.

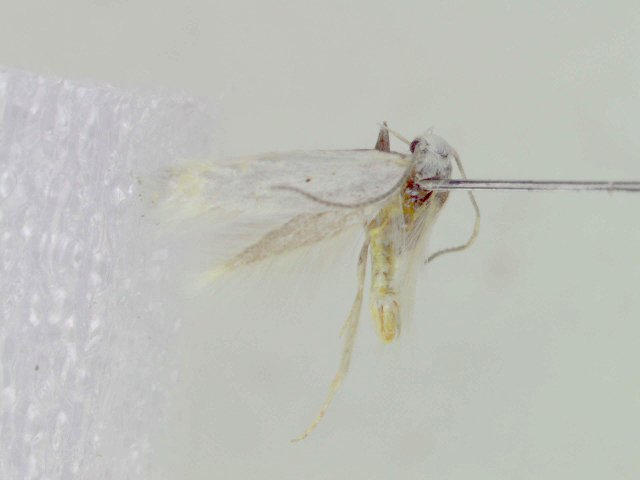
