= Elachista griseicornis =

Scientific classification
- Domain: Eukaryota
- Kingdom: Animalia
- Phylum: Arthropoda
- Class: Insecta
- Order: Lepidoptera
- Family: Elachistidae
- Genus: Elachista
- Species: E. griseicornis

Binomial name
- Elachista griseicornis Meyrick, 1932

Species of moth

Elachista griseicornis is a moth of the family Elachistidae. It is found in Ontario, Quebec, Minnesota, and Connecticut.

The length of the forewings is 3.9–4.3 millimetres (0.15–0.17 in).
