= Elachista albisquamella =

Scientific classification
- Kingdom: Animalia
- Phylum: Arthropoda
- Clade: Pancrustacea
- Class: Insecta
- Order: Lepidoptera
- Family: Elachistidae
- Genus: Elachista
- Species: E. albisquamella

Binomial name
- Elachista albisquamella Zeller, 1877

Species of moth

Elachista albisquamella is a moth in the family Elachistidae. It was described by Philipp Christoph Zeller in 1877. It is found in Colombia.
