= Elachista stramineola =

Scientific classification
- Domain: Eukaryota
- Kingdom: Animalia
- Phylum: Arthropoda
- Class: Insecta
- Order: Lepidoptera
- Family: Elachistidae
- Genus: Elachista
- Species: E. stramineola

Binomial name
- Elachista stramineola Braun, 1921

Species of moth

Elachista stramineola is a moth of the family Elachistidae. It is found in North America, where it has been recorded from California, Alberta, Washington, British Columbia and Montana.

The wingspan is 9–11.5 mm. The forewings are fuscous, somewhat dusted with yellowish white, especially in the basal third. The hindwings are pale fuscous. Adults have been recorded on wing in July.
