= Elachista phalaridis =

Scientific classification
- Kingdom: Animalia
- Phylum: Arthropoda
- Clade: Pancrustacea
- Class: Insecta
- Order: Lepidoptera
- Family: Elachistidae
- Genus: Elachista
- Species: E. phalaridis

Binomial name
- Elachista phalaridis Parenti, 1983

Species of moth

Elachista phalaridis is a moth in the family Elachistidae. It was described by Umberto Parenti in 1983. It is found in Japan (Honshu) and in Korea.

The length of the forewings is 3.6–3.8 mm for males and 3.8–4.2 mm for females. The forewings are black-brownish, with silver-whitish markings.
