= Elachista latipenella =

Scientific classification
- Domain: Eukaryota
- Kingdom: Animalia
- Phylum: Arthropoda
- Class: Insecta
- Order: Lepidoptera
- Family: Elachistidae
- Genus: Elachista
- Species: E. latipenella

Binomial name
- Elachista latipenella Sinev & Budashkin, 1991

Species of moth

Elachista latipenella is a moth of the family Elachistidae that is endemic to Ukraine.
