= Elachista arenbergeri =

Scientific classification
- Kingdom: Animalia
- Phylum: Arthropoda
- Class: Insecta
- Order: Lepidoptera
- Family: Elachistidae
- Genus: Elachista
- Species: E. arenbergeri

Binomial name
- Elachista arenbergeri Traugott-Olsen, 1988

Species of moth

Elachista arenbergeri is a moth in the family Elachistidae. It was described by Traugott-Olsen in 1988. It is found in Tunisia.
