= Elachista quadrata =

Scientific classification
- Kingdom: Animalia
- Phylum: Arthropoda
- Class: Insecta
- Order: Lepidoptera
- Family: Elachistidae
- Genus: Elachista
- Species: E. quadrata

Binomial name
- Elachista quadrata Meyrick, 1932

Species of moth

Elachista quadrata is a moth in the family Elachistidae. It was described by Edward Meyrick in 1932. It is found in India.

The wingspan is about 7.8 mm. The forewings are dark brown. The hindwings are dark brown.
