= Elachista brachyplectra =

Scientific classification
- Kingdom: Animalia
- Phylum: Arthropoda
- Class: Insecta
- Order: Lepidoptera
- Family: Elachistidae
- Genus: Elachista
- Species: E. brachyplectra

Binomial name
- Elachista brachyplectra Meyrick, 1921

Species of moth

Elachista brachyplectra is a moth in the family Elachistidae. It was described by Edward Meyrick in 1921. It is found on Java and in Sri Lanka and southern India.

The wingspan is 5–6 mm.
