= Elachista spiculifera =

Scientific classification
- Kingdom: Animalia
- Phylum: Arthropoda
- Class: Insecta
- Order: Lepidoptera
- Family: Elachistidae
- Genus: Elachista
- Species: E. spiculifera

Binomial name
- Elachista spiculifera Meyrick, 1922

Species of moth

Elachista spiculifera is a moth in the family Elachistidae. It was described by Edward Meyrick in 1922. It is found in India.

The wingspan is about 7.9 mm. The forewings are greyish brown. The hindwings are dark brown.
