= Elachista kleini =

Scientific classification
- Domain: Eukaryota
- Kingdom: Animalia
- Phylum: Arthropoda
- Class: Insecta
- Order: Lepidoptera
- Family: Elachistidae
- Genus: Elachista
- Species: E. kleini

Binomial name
- Elachista kleini Amsel, 1935

Species of moth

Elachista kleini is a moth in the family Elachistidae. It was described by Hans Georg Amsel in 1935. It is found in Palestine. There are also records for Spain, Portugal, former Yugoslavia and European Turkey.
