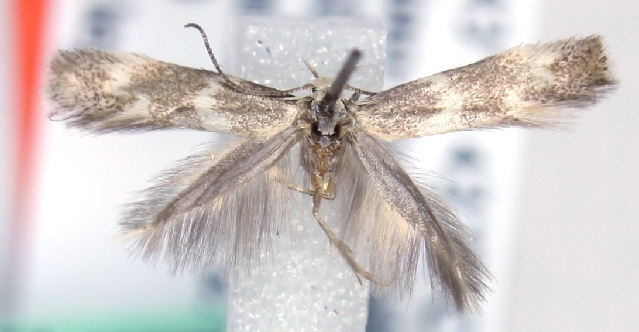

Scientific classification
- Kingdom: Animalia
- Phylum: Arthropoda
- Class: Insecta
- Order: Lepidoptera
- Family: Elachistidae
- Genus: Elachista
- Species: E. titanella

Binomial name
- Elachista titanella Kaila & Jalava, 1994

Synonyms
- Elachista coeneni titanella

= Elachista titanella =

Species of moth

Elachista titanella is a moth of the family Elachistidae. It is found in the central Caucasus Mountains in Russia.

The length of the forewings is 5–6 mm.
