= Elachista olgae =

Scientific classification
- Kingdom: Animalia
- Phylum: Arthropoda
- Clade: Pancrustacea
- Class: Insecta
- Order: Lepidoptera
- Family: Elachistidae
- Genus: Elachista
- Species: E. olgae

Binomial name
- Elachista olgae (Sinev, 1992)

Synonyms
- Atrinia olgae Sinev, 1992

Species of moth

Elachista olgae is a moth in the family Elachistidae. It was described by Sinev in 1992. It is found in Russia.
