= Elachista leucosticta =

Scientific classification
- Domain: Eukaryota
- Kingdom: Animalia
- Phylum: Arthropoda
- Class: Insecta
- Order: Lepidoptera
- Family: Elachistidae
- Genus: Elachista
- Species: E. leucosticta

Binomial name
- Elachista leucosticta Braun, 1948

Species of moth

Elachista leucosticta is a moth of the family Elachistidae. It is found in North America, where it has been recorded from California, Iowa and Ontario.

The wingspan is about 6.5 mm. Adults have been recorded on wing in June and from August to September.
