= Elachista densa =

Scientific classification
- Domain: Eukaryota
- Kingdom: Animalia
- Phylum: Arthropoda
- Class: Insecta
- Order: Lepidoptera
- Family: Elachistidae
- Genus: Elachista
- Species: E. densa

Binomial name
- Elachista densa Parenti, 1981

Species of moth

Elachista densa is a moth of the family Elachistidae. It is found in Iran and the United Arab Emirates.
