= Elachista albicapitella =

Scientific classification
- Domain: Eukaryota
- Kingdom: Animalia
- Phylum: Arthropoda
- Class: Insecta
- Order: Lepidoptera
- Family: Elachistidae
- Genus: Elachista
- Species: E. albicapitella

Binomial name
- Elachista albicapitella Engel, 1907

Species of moth

Elachista albicapitella is a moth of the family Elachistidae. It is found in North America, where it has been recorded from Illinois, Pennsylvania, Ohio and Nova Scotia.

The wingspan is 8–9 mm. Adults have been recorded on wing in February and from May to July.

The larvae feed on Poa sylvestris. They mine the leaves of their host plant. Mining larvae can be found in early spring.
