= Elachista epicaeria =

Scientific classification
- Kingdom: Animalia
- Phylum: Arthropoda
- Clade: Pancrustacea
- Class: Insecta
- Order: Lepidoptera
- Family: Elachistidae
- Genus: Elachista
- Species: E. epicaeria

Binomial name
- Elachista epicaeria (Diakonoff, 1955)

Synonyms
- Cosmiotes epicaeria Diakonoff, 1955

Species of moth

Elachista epicaeria is a moth in the family Elachistidae. It was described by Alexey Diakonoff in 1955. It is found in New Guinea.
