= Elachista cupreella =

Scientific classification
- Kingdom: Animalia
- Phylum: Arthropoda
- Class: Insecta
- Order: Lepidoptera
- Family: Elachistidae
- Genus: Elachista
- Species: E. cupreella

Binomial name
- Elachista cupreella Blanchard, 1852

Species of moth

Elachista cupreella is a moth in the family Elachistidae. It was described by Blanchard in 1852. It is found in Chile.
