= Elachista levasi =

Scientific classification
- Kingdom: Animalia
- Phylum: Arthropoda
- Clade: Pancrustacea
- Class: Insecta
- Order: Lepidoptera
- Family: Elachistidae
- Genus: Elachista
- Species: E. levasi

Binomial name
- Elachista levasi Sruoga, 1998

Species of moth

Elachista levasi is a moth of the family Elachistidae. It is found in Turkmenistan.

The wingspan is about 8.6 mm for males. Adults have been recorded in mid-June.
