= Elachista galbina =

Scientific classification
- Kingdom: Animalia
- Phylum: Arthropoda
- Class: Insecta
- Order: Lepidoptera
- Family: Elachistidae
- Genus: Elachista
- Species: E. galbina

Binomial name
- Elachista galbina Kaila, 2012

Species of moth

Elachista galbina is a moth of the family Elachistidae. It is found in Kazakhstan. The habitat consists of xerothermic slopes with steppe vegetation.

The wingspan is 8.5–10 mm.
