= Elachista pallens =

Scientific classification
- Kingdom: Animalia
- Phylum: Arthropoda
- Clade: Pancrustacea
- Class: Insecta
- Order: Lepidoptera
- Family: Elachistidae
- Genus: Elachista
- Species: E. pallens

Binomial name
- Elachista pallens (Sruoga, 1990)

Synonyms
- Cosmiotes pallens Sruoga, 1990

Species of moth

Elachista pallens is a moth of the family Elachistidae. It is found in Turkmenistan. Adults have been recorded from mid-April to mid-August. There are probably two generations per year.
