= Elachista solena =

Scientific classification
- Kingdom: Animalia
- Phylum: Arthropoda
- Class: Insecta
- Order: Lepidoptera
- Family: Elachistidae
- Genus: Elachista
- Species: E. solena

Binomial name
- Elachista solena (Bradley, 1974)

Synonyms
- Eupneusta solena Bradley, 1974

Species of moth

Elachista solena is a moth in the family Elachistidae. It is found in New Guinea.

The larvae feed on sugar cane. The larvae mine the leaves of their host plant.
