= Elachista agilis =

Scientific classification
- Domain: Eukaryota
- Kingdom: Animalia
- Phylum: Arthropoda
- Class: Insecta
- Order: Lepidoptera
- Family: Elachistidae
- Genus: Elachista
- Species: E. agilis

Binomial name
- Elachista agilis Braun, 1921

Species of moth

Elachista agilis is a moth of the family Elachistidae. It is found in Canada, where it has been recorded from Alberta and Montana.

The wingspan is about 7 mm.
