= Elachista orba =

Scientific classification
- Kingdom: Animalia
- Phylum: Arthropoda
- Class: Insecta
- Order: Lepidoptera
- Family: Elachistidae
- Genus: Elachista
- Species: E. orba

Binomial name
- Elachista orba Meyrick, 1921

Species of moth

Elachista orba is a moth in the family Elachistidae. It was described by Edward Meyrick in 1921. It is found on Java.

The length of the forewings is about 4 mm. The forewings are grey, irrorated with blackish and with an oblique streak of white irroration from the costa at three-fifths, reaching nearly to the tornus. The hindwings are grey.
