= Elachista orestella =

Scientific classification
- Domain: Eukaryota
- Kingdom: Animalia
- Phylum: Arthropoda
- Class: Insecta
- Order: Lepidoptera
- Family: Elachistidae
- Genus: Elachista
- Species: E. orestella

Binomial name
- Elachista orestella Busck, 1908

Species of moth

Elachista orestella is a moth of the family Elachistidae. It is found in North America in Alberta, Labrador, New Brunswick, Newfoundland and Labrador, Quebec, Yukon, Alaska, Illinois, Massachusetts, Minnesota, Nebraska, New Jersey, New York and Pennsylvania.

The length of the forewings is 3.1–5.7 mm.
