= Elachista delocharis =

Scientific classification
- Kingdom: Animalia
- Phylum: Arthropoda
- Class: Insecta
- Order: Lepidoptera
- Family: Elachistidae
- Genus: Elachista
- Species: E. delocharis

Binomial name
- Elachista delocharis Meyrick, 1932

Species of moth

Elachista delocharis is a moth of the family Elachistidae that is endemic to Ethiopia.
