= Elachista fasciocaliginosa =

Scientific classification
- Domain: Eukaryota
- Kingdom: Animalia
- Phylum: Arthropoda
- Class: Insecta
- Order: Lepidoptera
- Family: Elachistidae
- Genus: Elachista
- Species: E. fasciocaliginosa

Binomial name
- Elachista fasciocaliginosa Sugisima, 2005

Species of moth

Elachista fasciocaliginosa is a moth in the family Elachistidae. It was described by Sugisima in 2005. It is found in Japan(Honshu).

The length of the forewings is about 2.8 mm for males and 2.9-3.1 mm for females.
