= Elachista puplesisi =

Scientific classification
- Kingdom: Animalia
- Phylum: Arthropoda
- Clade: Pancrustacea
- Class: Insecta
- Order: Lepidoptera
- Family: Elachistidae
- Genus: Elachista
- Species: E. puplesisi

Binomial name
- Elachista puplesisi Sruoga, 2000

Species of moth

Elachista puplesisi is a moth of the family Elachistidae that is endemic to Turkmenistan.

The wingspan is 9 millimetres (0.35 in) for males.
