= Elachista altaica =

Scientific classification
- Kingdom: Animalia
- Phylum: Arthropoda
- Clade: Pancrustacea
- Class: Insecta
- Order: Lepidoptera
- Family: Elachistidae
- Genus: Elachista
- Species: E. altaica

Binomial name
- Elachista altaica (Sinev, 1998)

Synonyms
- Hemiprosopa altaica Sinev, 1998

Species of moth

Elachista altaica is a moth of the family Elachistidae. It is found in Russia (Altai, Tuva and the southern Ural Mountains).
