= Elachista vasrana =

Scientific classification
- Kingdom: Animalia
- Phylum: Arthropoda
- Class: Insecta
- Order: Lepidoptera
- Family: Elachistidae
- Genus: Elachista
- Species: E. vasrana

Binomial name
- Elachista vasrana Kaila, 2000

Species of moth

Elachista vasrana is a moth in the family Elachistidae. It was described by Lauri Kaila in 2000. It is found in Peru.
