= Elachista tabghaella =

Scientific classification
- Domain: Eukaryota
- Kingdom: Animalia
- Phylum: Arthropoda
- Class: Insecta
- Order: Lepidoptera
- Family: Elachistidae
- Genus: Elachista
- Species: E. tabghaella

Binomial name
- Elachista tabghaella Amsel, 1935

Species of moth

Elachista tabghaella is a moth in the family Elachistidae. It was described by Hans Georg Amsel in 1935. It is found in Palestine.
