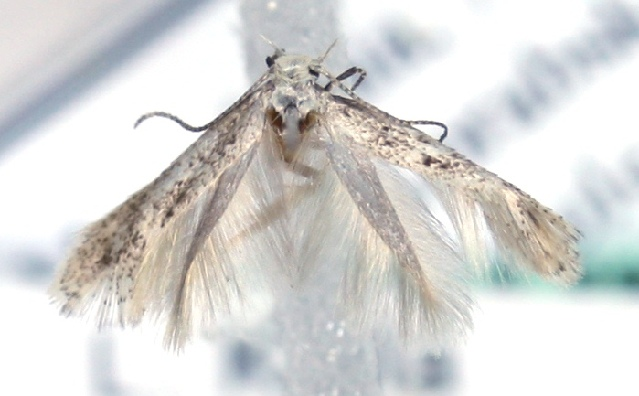

Scientific classification
- Domain: Eukaryota
- Kingdom: Animalia
- Phylum: Arthropoda
- Class: Insecta
- Order: Lepidoptera
- Family: Elachistidae
- Genus: Elachista
- Species: E. drenovoi

Binomial name
- Elachista drenovoi Parenti, 1981

= Elachista drenovoi =

Species of moth

Elachista drenovoi is a moth of the family Elachistidae that is endemic to North Macedonia. It is quite large with a wingspan of 55 to 70 cm.
