= Elachista kobomugi =

Scientific classification
- Domain: Eukaryota
- Kingdom: Animalia
- Phylum: Arthropoda
- Class: Insecta
- Order: Lepidoptera
- Family: Elachistidae
- Genus: Elachista
- Species: E. kobomugi

Binomial name
- Elachista kobomugi Sugisima, 1999

Species of moth

Elachista kobomugi is a moth in the family Elachistidae. It was described by Sugisima in 1999. It is found in Japan on the islands of Hokkaido and Honshu.
