= Elachista jaeckhi =

Scientific classification
- Kingdom: Animalia
- Phylum: Arthropoda
- Class: Insecta
- Order: Lepidoptera
- Family: Elachistidae
- Genus: Elachista
- Species: E. jaeckhi

Binomial name
- Elachista jaeckhi Traugott-Olsen, 1990

Species of moth

Elachista jaeckhi is a moth of the family Elachistidae first described by Ernst Christian Traugott-Olsen in 1990. It is found in the former Yugoslavia.
