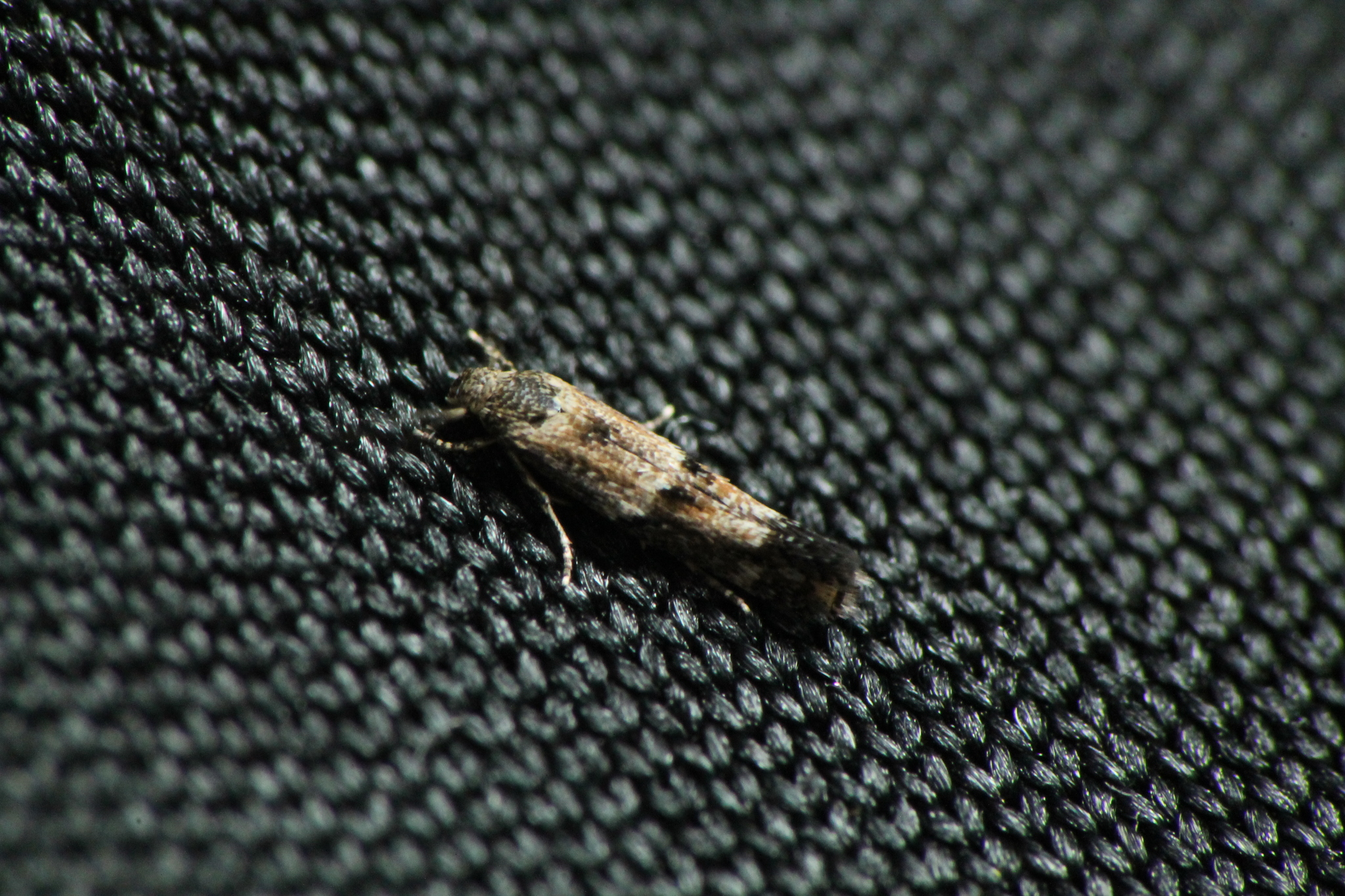

Scientific classification
- Kingdom: Animalia
- Phylum: Arthropoda
- Class: Insecta
- Order: Lepidoptera
- Family: Elachistidae
- Genus: Elachista
- Species: E. archaeonoma

Binomial name
- Elachista archaeonoma Meyrick, 1889

Synonyms
- Cosmiotes archaeonoma (Meyrick, 1889)

= Elachista archaeonoma =

Species of moth

Elachista archaeonoma is a species of moth in the family Elachistidae. It was first described by Edward Meyrick in 1889. It is endemic to New Zealand.

== Taxonomy ==
This species was first described by Edward Meyrick in 1889 and named Elachista archaeonoma. In 1928 George Hudson discussed and illustrated this species in his 1928 book The butterflies and moths of New Zealand.

== Description ==
Hudson described this species as follows:

The expansion of the wings is about five-sixteenths of an inch. The fore-wings of the male are dark grey densely speckled with paler grey; there are two dull white marks a little before the middle followed by two blackish spots placed on the costa and dorsum and a blackish streak in the disc; there is a marginal series of black dots. The hind-wings are dark grey. In the female the fore-wings are white sprinkled with brown from the base to beyond 4; there is a large blackish-brown blotch near the middle and a smaller blotch at the apex, the two being connected by a slender line in the disc; a number of large black seales is situated on the cilia. The hind-wings are very pale grey.

== Distribution ==
This species is endemic to New Zealand.

== Behaviour ==
Adults have been recorded on wing in December and January.

== Host species ==
The larvae of this species are grass leaf miners.
