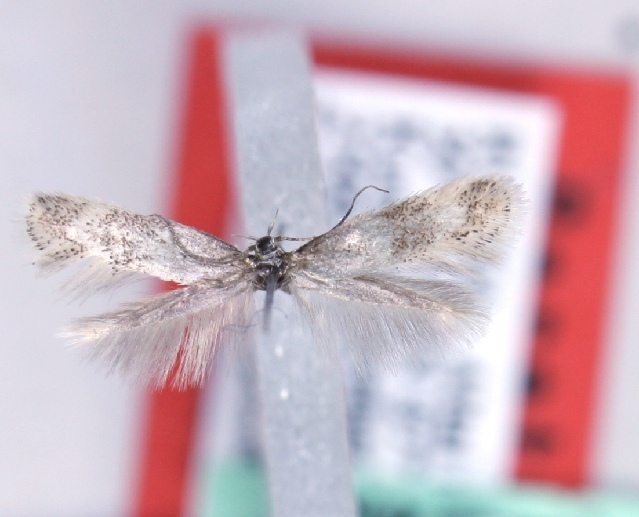

Scientific classification
- Kingdom: Animalia
- Phylum: Arthropoda
- Class: Insecta
- Order: Lepidoptera
- Family: Elachistidae
- Genus: Elachista
- Species: E. camilla

Binomial name
- Elachista camilla Kaila, 2007

= Elachista camilla =

Species of moth

Elachista camilla is a moth of the family Elachistidae. It is found in Russia (the Altai Mountains).

The length of the forewings is 3.8–5 mm.
