= Elachista trifasciata =

Scientific classification
- Domain: Eukaryota
- Kingdom: Animalia
- Phylum: Arthropoda
- Class: Insecta
- Order: Lepidoptera
- Family: Elachistidae
- Genus: Elachista
- Species: E. trifasciata

Binomial name
- Elachista trifasciata (E. Wollaston, 1879)

Synonyms
- Stagmatophora trifasciata E. Wollaston, 1879

Species of moth

Elachista trifasciata is a moth of the family Elachistidae. It was described by Edith Wollaston in 1879 and is found on Saint Helena island in the South Atlantic Ocean.
