= Elachista putris =

Scientific classification
- Kingdom: Animalia
- Phylum: Arthropoda
- Clade: Pancrustacea
- Class: Insecta
- Order: Lepidoptera
- Family: Elachistidae
- Genus: Elachista
- Species: E. putris

Binomial name
- Elachista putris Meyrick, 1923

Synonyms
- Elachista leucobathra Meyrick, 1923

Species of moth

Elachista putris is a moth in the family Elachistidae. It was described by Edward Meyrick in 1923. It is found in northern India.

The wingspan of Elachista putris is about 8 mm. The forewings are dark purplish-grey, irrorated with blackish and posteriorly slightly speckled with whitish. There is a narrow ochreous-white fascia before the middle which is narrower on the costa and has some blackish scales. There is also an ochreous-white spot with some blackish scales on the costa at three-fourths, and a small similar spot on the dorsum. The hindwings are dark grey.
