= Elachista nymphaea =

Scientific classification
- Kingdom: Animalia
- Phylum: Arthropoda
- Class: Insecta
- Order: Lepidoptera
- Family: Elachistidae
- Genus: Elachista
- Species: E. nymphaea

Binomial name
- Elachista nymphaea Meyrick, 1911

Species of moth

Elachista nymphaea is a moth of the family Elachistidae. It is found in South Africa.
