= Elachista megagnathos =

Scientific classification
- Kingdom: Animalia
- Phylum: Arthropoda
- Clade: Pancrustacea
- Class: Insecta
- Order: Lepidoptera
- Family: Elachistidae
- Genus: Elachista
- Species: E. megagnathos

Binomial name
- Elachista megagnathos Sruoga, 1990

Species of moth

Elachista megagnathos is a moth of the family Elachistidae that is found in Russia (the Russian Far East and the southern Ural Mountains).

The length of the forewings is 2.6–2.9 millimetres (0.10–0.11 in) for males.

Adults have been recorded in July in the Russian Far East.
