= Elachista cornutifera =

Scientific classification
- Kingdom: Animalia
- Phylum: Arthropoda
- Clade: Pancrustacea
- Class: Insecta
- Order: Lepidoptera
- Family: Elachistidae
- Genus: Elachista
- Species: E. cornutifera

Binomial name
- Elachista cornutifera (Sruoga, 1995)

Synonyms
- Cosmiotes cornutifera Sruoga, 1995

Species of moth

Elachista cornutifera is a moth in the family Elachistidae. It was described by Sruoga in 1995. It is found in the Russian Far East.
