= Elachista argopis =

"Elachista" argopis

Scientific classification
- Kingdom: Animalia
- Phylum: Arthropoda
- Clade: Pancrustacea
- Class: Insecta
- Order: Lepidoptera
- Family: Cosmopterigidae
- Genus: incertae sedis
- Species: "E." argopis

Binomial name
- "Elachista" argopis Meyrick, 1897

Species of moth

"Elachista" argopis is a moth in the family Cosmopterigidae. It was described by Edward Meyrick in 1897. It is found in Australia, where it has been recorded from Western Australia.

The wingspan is 8–9 mm. The forewings are white, irrorated with dark fuscous. There is an indistinct blackish line on the fold. The plical and second discal stigmata are cloudy, indistinct and dark fuscous or blackish, the former followed by a clear white spot in males. The hindwings are dark grey.

== Taxonomy ==
The species was described in the family Elachistidae, but was excluded from this family and placed in the Cosmopterigidae in a later study.
