= Elachista arctodyta =

"Elachista" arctodyta

Scientific classification
- Kingdom: Animalia
- Phylum: Arthropoda
- Clade: Pancrustacea
- Class: Insecta
- Order: Lepidoptera
- Family: Scythrididae
- Genus: incertae sedis
- Species: "E." arctodyta

Binomial name
- "Elachista" arctodyta Meyrick, 1897

Species of moth

"Elachista" arctodyta is a moth of the family Scythrididae. It is found in Australia, including Western Australia.

The wingspan is about 8 mm. The head, palpi, antennae and thorax are whitish-fuscous. The abdomen is black above, with some white scales and ochreous-whitish beneath. The forewings are whitish-fuscous, irregularly sprinkled with dark fuscous. The hindwings are grey. Adults have been recorded in October.

== Taxonomy ==
The species was originally described in the family Elachistidae. It was recently moved to the Scythrididae, but has not been assigned to a new genus yet.
