= Elachista amseli =

Scientific classification
- Domain: Eukaryota
- Kingdom: Animalia
- Phylum: Arthropoda
- Class: Insecta
- Order: Lepidoptera
- Family: Elachistidae
- Genus: Elachista
- Species: E. amseli

Binomial name
- Elachista amseli (Parenti, 1981)

Synonyms
- Cosmiotes amseli Parenti, 1981; Cosmiotes kopetdagica Sruoga, 1990; Elachista kopetdagica

Species of moth

Elachista amseli is a moth of the family Elachistidae. It is found in Afghanistan, southern Tajikistan and Turkmenistan.

The wingspan is 6.5–7 millimetres (0.26–0.28 in).
