= Elachista demogenes =

"Elachista" demogenes

Scientific classification
- Kingdom: Animalia
- Phylum: Arthropoda
- Clade: Pancrustacea
- Class: Insecta
- Order: Lepidoptera
- Superfamily: Gelechioidea
- Genus: incertae sedis
- Species: "E." demogenes

Binomial name
- "Elachista" demogenes Meyrick, 1897

Species of moth

"Elachista" demogenes is a moth in the superfamily Gelechioidea. It was described by Edward Meyrick in 1897. It is found in Australia, where it has been recorded from South Australia.

The wingspan is 7–8 mm (0.28–0.31 in). The forewings are pale grey, irrorated with dark fuscous, sometimes with a suffusion of black irroration towards the dorsum anteriorly and toward the costa posteriorly. The plical and second discal stigmata are black. The hindwings are grey.

== Taxonomy ==
The species was described in the family Elachistidae, but was excluded from this family in a later study.
