= Elachista cataptila =

"Elachista" cataptila

Scientific classification
- Kingdom: Animalia
- Phylum: Arthropoda
- Clade: Pancrustacea
- Class: Insecta
- Order: Lepidoptera
- Family: Elachistidae
- Subfamily: Elachistinae
- Genus: incertae sedis
- Species: "E." cataptila

Binomial name
- "Elachista" cataptila Meyrick, 1897

Species of moth

"Elachista" cataptila is a moth with an unclear taxonomic position. It was described by Edward Meyrick in 1897. It is found in Australia, where it has been recorded from Western Australia.

The wingspan is 7–8 mm. The forewings are grey whitish, irrorated (sprinkled) with black or dark grey. There is an ill-defined blackish discal streak from the base to near the middle. The plical and second discal stigmata are black. The hindwings are grey.

== Taxonomy ==
The species was described in the family Elachistidae, but was excluded from this family in a later study.
