= List of moths of Australia (Blastodacnidae) =

Partial list of Australian moths

This is a list of the Australian species of the family Blastodacnidae. It also acts as an index to the species articles and forms part of the full List of moths of Australia.

- Chrysoclista monotyla Meyrick, 1921
- Microcolona arizela Meyrick, 1897
- Microcolona celaenospila Turner, 1916
- Microcolona characta Meyrick, 1897
- Microcolona crypsicasis Meyrick, 1897
- Microcolona embolopis Meyrick, 1897
- Microcolona epixutha Meyrick, 1897
- Microcolona leptopis Meyrick, 1897
- Microcolona leucochtha Meyrick, 1897
- Microcolona nodata Meyrick, 1897
- Microcolona polygethes Turner, 1939
- Microcolona ponophora Meyrick, 1897
- Microcolona sollennis Meyrick, 1897
- Microcolona spaniospila Turner, 1923
- Microcolona thymopis Meyrick, 1897
- Microcolona toropis (Meyrick, 1897)
- Microcolona trigonospila Meyrick, 1897
- Zaratha crotolitha Meyrick, 1915
- Zaratha trisecta Meyrick, 1915
