= Homoeoprepes =

Scientific classification
- Domain: Eukaryota
- Kingdom: Animalia
- Phylum: Arthropoda
- Class: Insecta
- Order: Lepidoptera
- Family: Elachistidae
- Subfamily: Parametriotinae
- Genus: Homoeoprepes; Walsingham, 1909

Genus of moths

Homoeoprepes is a genus of moths of the family Elachistidae.

== Species ==
- Homoeoprepes felisae Clarke, 1962
- Homoeoprepes sympatrica Clarke, 1962
- Homoeoprepes trochiloides Walsingham, 1909
