= Microcolona autotypa =

Scientific classification
- Kingdom: Animalia
- Phylum: Arthropoda
- Class: Insecta
- Order: Lepidoptera
- Family: Elachistidae
- Genus: Microcolona
- Species: M. autotypa

Binomial name
- Microcolona autotypa Meyrick, 1922

Species of moth

Microcolona autotypa is a moth in the family Elachistidae. It is found in southern India.

The wingspan is about 11 mm. The forewings are grey, the tips of the scales minutely ochreous-whitish, forming a very fine transverse striation and a tuft beneath the fold at one-fourth. The stigmata is blackish, accompanied by tufts. The hindwings are grey.
