= Zaratha mesonyctia =

Scientific classification
- Kingdom: Animalia
- Phylum: Arthropoda
- Class: Insecta
- Order: Lepidoptera
- Family: Elachistidae
- Genus: Zaratha
- Species: Z. mesonyctia

Binomial name
- Zaratha mesonyctia Meyrick, 1909

Species of moth

Zaratha mesonyctia is a moth of the family Elachistidae. It is found in Bolivia.
