= Zaratha plumbilinea =

Scientific classification
- Domain: Eukaryota
- Kingdom: Animalia
- Phylum: Arthropoda
- Class: Insecta
- Order: Lepidoptera
- Family: Elachistidae
- Genus: Zaratha
- Species: Z. plumbilinea

Binomial name
- Zaratha plumbilinea (Diakonoff, 1955)

Synonyms
- Acrocercops plumbilinea Diakonoff, 1955

Species of moth

Zaratha plumbilinea is a moth in the family Elachistidae. It was described by Alexey Diakonoff in 1955. It is found in New Guinea.
