= Zaratha macrocera =

Scientific classification
- Kingdom: Animalia
- Phylum: Arthropoda
- Class: Insecta
- Order: Lepidoptera
- Family: Elachistidae
- Genus: Zaratha
- Species: Z. macrocera

Binomial name
- Zaratha macrocera Felder & Rogenhofer, 1875

Species of moth

Zaratha macrocera is a moth of the family Elachistidae. It is found in Panama, Colombia and Brazil.
