= Microcolona aurantiella =

Scientific classification
- Kingdom: Animalia
- Phylum: Arthropoda
- Clade: Pancrustacea
- Class: Insecta
- Order: Lepidoptera
- Family: Elachistidae
- Genus: Microcolona
- Species: M. aurantiella

Binomial name
- Microcolona aurantiella Sinev, 1988

Species of moth

Microcolona aurantiella is a moth in the family Elachistidae. It is found in south-eastern Siberia and Korea.
