= Microcolona leucosticta =

Scientific classification
- Kingdom: Animalia
- Phylum: Arthropoda
- Class: Insecta
- Order: Lepidoptera
- Family: Elachistidae
- Genus: Microcolona
- Species: M. leucosticta

Binomial name
- Microcolona leucosticta Meyrick, 1928

Species of moth

Microcolona leucosticta is a moth in the family Elachistidae. It is found in southern India.
