= Zaratha dicellias =

Scientific classification
- Kingdom: Animalia
- Phylum: Arthropoda
- Class: Insecta
- Order: Lepidoptera
- Family: Elachistidae
- Genus: Zaratha
- Species: Z. dicellias

Binomial name
- Zaratha dicellias Meyrick, 1909

Species of moth

Zaratha dicellias is a moth of the family Elachistidae. It is found in India (Assam).
