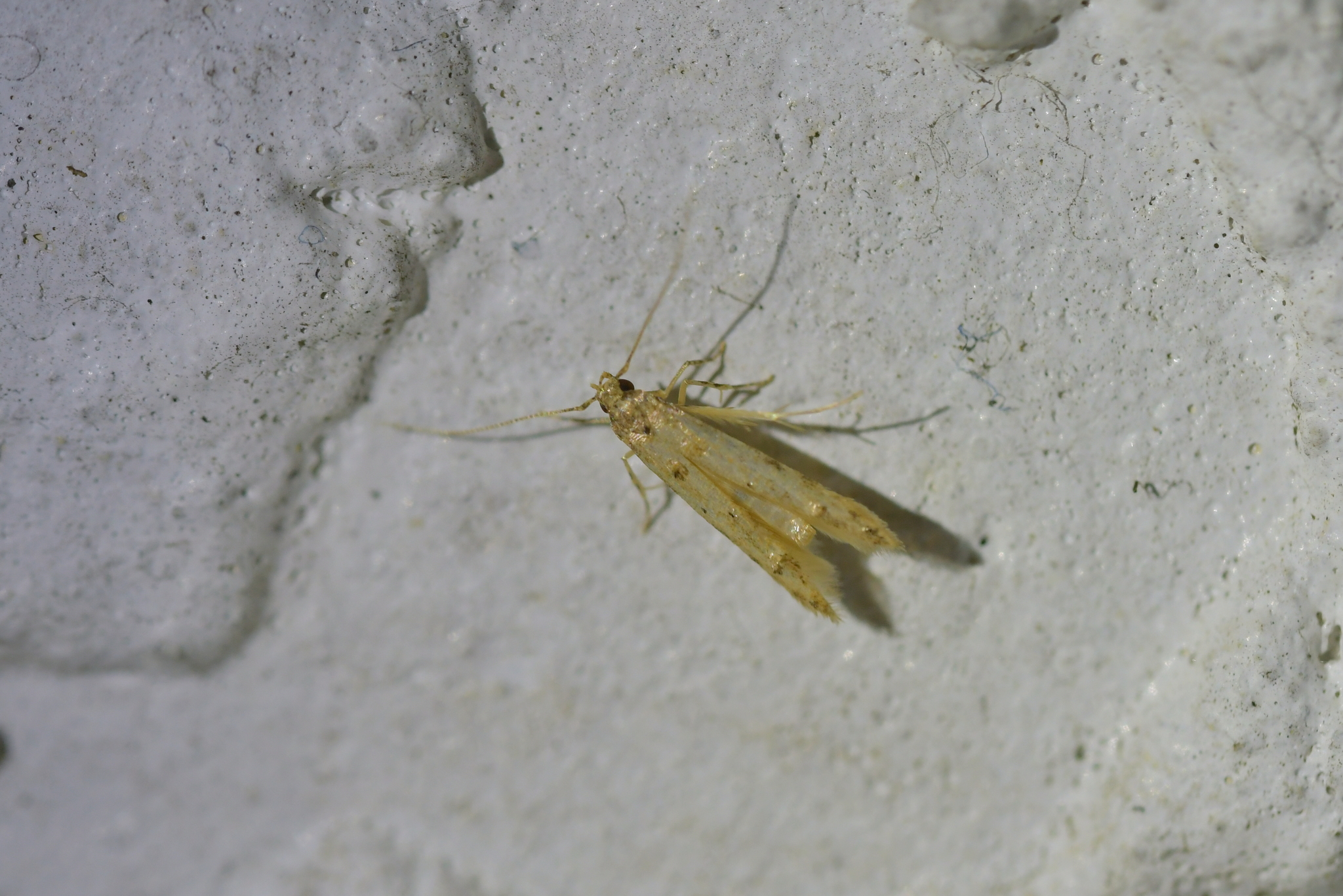

Scientific classification
- Kingdom: Animalia
- Phylum: Arthropoda
- Clade: Pancrustacea
- Class: Insecta
- Order: Lepidoptera
- Family: Elachistidae
- Genus: Microcolona
- Species: M. limodes

Binomial name
- Microcolona limodes Meyrick, 1897

= Microcolona limodes =

Species of moth

Microcolona limodes is a species of moth in the family Elachistidae. It is endemic to New Zealand. The larvae of this moth eat the seeds of endemic Myrsine species.

== Taxonomy ==
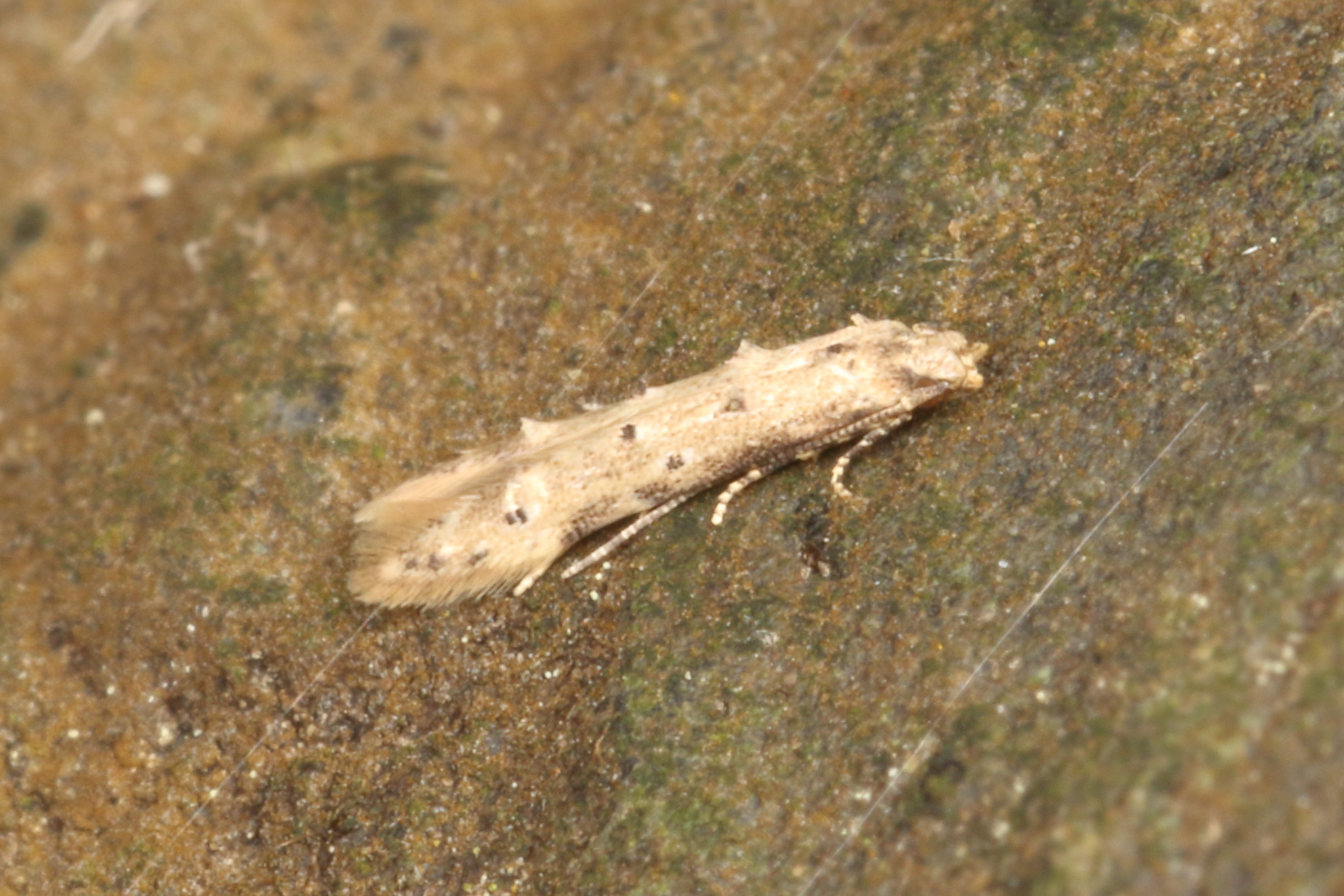
Observation of M. limodes.

This species was described by Edward Meyrick in 1897 using material collected at Riccarton Bush in Christchurch during March. George Hudson discussed this species in his 1928 publication The Butterflies and Moths of New Zealand. The lectotype specimen is held at the Natural History Museum, London.

== Description ==
Meyrick described the species as follows:

♂︎♀︎. 7-8 mm. Head white, crown fuscous-sprinkled. Palpi white, second joint with a blackish lateral line, terminal joint with black subbasal and subapical rings. Antennae whitish, beneath fuscous-spotted. Thorax whitish-ochreous, with two dark fuscous posterior spots. Abdomen whitish. Legs dark fuscous, irrorated and ringed with whitish. Forewings very narrow, ochreous, mixed with white and sprinkled with dark fuscous, almost wholly suffused with white on anterior half and sometimes throughout; a raised black dot on fold at 1/6, a larger one beneath fold at 1/3, a third in disc before middle, a fourth beneath fold obliquely beyond third, almost dorsal, and two transversely placed close together or confluent above tornus; sometimes a blackish costal dot beyond middle; a black apical dot, and another obliquely above and before it : cilia whitish-ochreous, round apex sprinkled with black. Hindwings whitish-grey; cilia whitish-grey-ochreous.

== Distribution ==
This species is endemic to New Zealand. Other than in Canterbury, this species has also been found at Pitt Island and Northland.

== Habitat and host species ==
This species has been found in gumland heath habitat. The larvae of this moth feed on the seeds of Myrsine australis and Myrsine salicina.
