= Araucarivora =

Scientific classification
- Kingdom: Animalia
- Phylum: Arthropoda
- Clade: Pancrustacea
- Class: Insecta
- Order: Lepidoptera
- Family: Elachistidae
- Subfamily: Parametriotinae
- Genus: Araucarivora; Hodges, 1997
- Species: A. gentilii

Binomial name
- Araucarivora gentilii Hodges, 1997

Genus of moths

Araucarivora is a monotypic moth genus in the family Elachistidae. Its only species, Araucarivora gentilii, is found in Argentina. Both the genus and species were described by Ronald W. Hodges in 1997.
