= Homoeoprepes trochiloides =

Scientific classification
- Domain: Eukaryota
- Kingdom: Animalia
- Phylum: Arthropoda
- Class: Insecta
- Order: Lepidoptera
- Family: Elachistidae
- Genus: Homoeoprepes
- Species: H. trochiloides

Binomial name
- Homoeoprepes trochiloides Walsingham, 1909

Synonyms
- Mompha trochiloides Walsingham, 1909

Species of moth

Homoeoprepes trochiloides is a moth in the family Elachistidae. It was described by Thomas de Grey, 6th Baron Walsingham, in 1909. It is found in Costa Rica.

The wingspan is about 25 mm. The forewings are iridescent purplish, or bluish, grey, smeared with dark ferruginous, which becomes rich chestnut-brown in some lights, especially towards the apex. This dark shading commences at the base of the costa, where it forms an elongate patch of diffused scaling, scarcely separated from a large median blotch commencing near the middle of the base, following the cell almost to its outer extremity and diffused upward to the costa and downward into the middle of the fold. There is a patch of partly raised chestnut scales on the cell at one-third from the base, as well as a few similar scales in the fold somewhat beyond it, and, at the outer extremity of the cell a strong patch of raised dull golden scales, mixed with fuscous, whence a rich chestnut streak is produced to the apex, somewhat dilated upward to the costa above it. The hindwings are pale cupreous.
