= Zaratha pterodactylella =

Scientific classification
- Kingdom: Animalia
- Phylum: Arthropoda
- Class: Insecta
- Order: Lepidoptera
- Family: Elachistidae
- Genus: Zaratha
- Species: Z. pterodactylella

Binomial name
- Zaratha pterodactylella Walker, 1864

Synonyms
- Zaratha niveiventris Felder, 1875

Species of moth

Zaratha pterodactylella is a moth of the family Elachistidae. It is found in Central America.
