= Microcolona pycnitis =

Scientific classification
- Kingdom: Animalia
- Phylum: Arthropoda
- Class: Insecta
- Order: Lepidoptera
- Family: Elachistidae
- Genus: Microcolona
- Species: M. pycnitis

Binomial name
- Microcolona pycnitis Meyrick, 1915

Species of moth

Microcolona pycnitis is a moth in the family Elachistidae. It is found in Sri Lanka.

The wingspan is 9–13 mm. The forewings are fuscous with large tufts above the dorsum at one-fourth and the middle of the wing, edged with whitish-ochreous or whitish. The discal stigmata is blackish edged with whitish-ochreous or whitish. There is an elongate dark fuscous mark on the costa at two-thirds, edged laterally with whitish-ochreous or whitish. There are three costal and one terminal cloudy dark fuscous dots towards the apex, partially pale-edged. The hindwings are grey.
