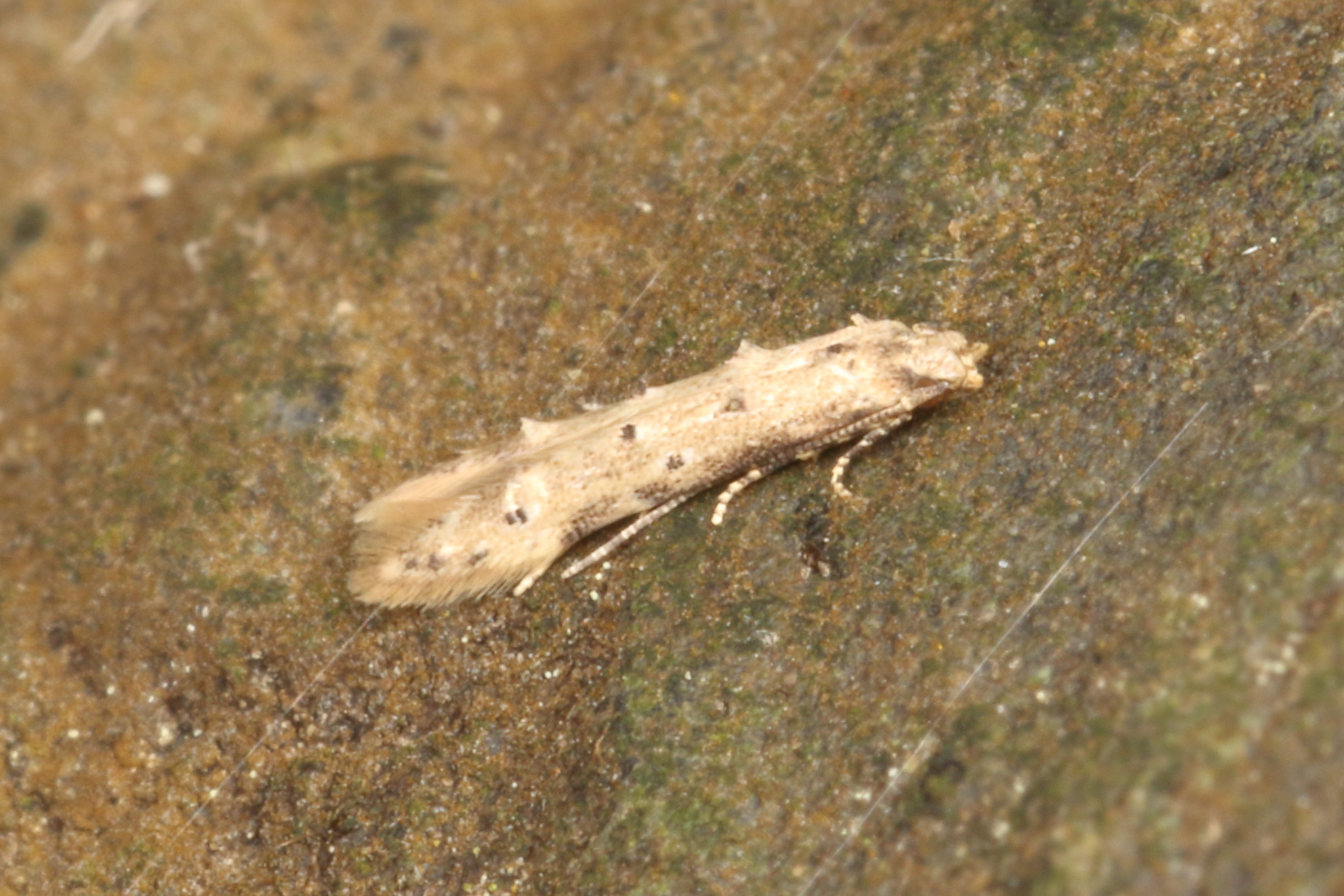
- Microcolona limodes
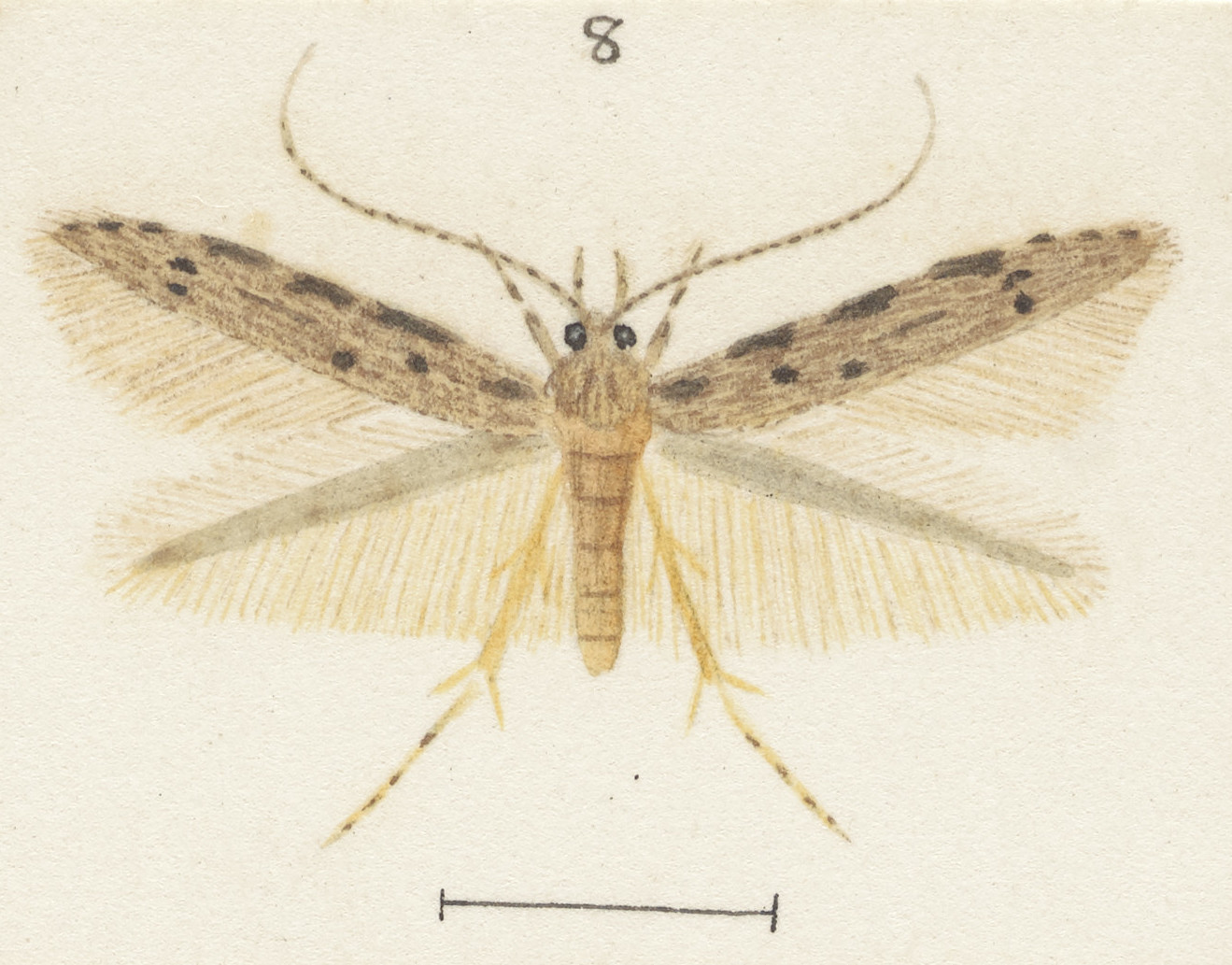
- Microcolona characta

Scientific classification
- Kingdom: Animalia
- Phylum: Arthropoda
- Class: Insecta
- Order: Lepidoptera
- Family: Elachistidae
- Subfamily: Parametriotinae
- Genus: Microcolona; Meyrick, 1897

Type species
- Microcolona characta Meyrick, 1897

Synonyms
- Griphocosma T. B. Fletcher, 1929 (disputed)

= Microcolona =

Genus of moths

Microcolona is a genus of moths of the family Elachistidae described by Edward Meyrick in 1897.

== Taxonomy ==
The genus is mostly placed in the family Elachistidae, but other authors list it as a member of the families Agonoxenidae or Blastodacnidae.

== Species ==
- Microcolona arizela Meyrick, 1897
- Microcolona aurantiella Sinev, 1988
- Microcolona autotypa
- Microcolona celaenospila Turner, 1916
- Microcolona characta Meyrick, 1897
- Microcolona cricota
- Microcolona crypsicasis Meyrick, 1897
- Microcolona dorochares
- Microcolona embolopis Meyrick, 1897
- Microcolona emporica
- Microcolona epixutha Meyrick, 1897
- Microcolona eriptila
- Microcolona leptopis Meyrick, 1897
- Microcolona leucochtha Meyrick, 1897
- Microcolona leucosticta
- Microcolona limodes
- Microcolona nodata Meyrick, 1897
- Microcolona omphalias
- Microcolona pantominia
- Microcolona phalarota
- Microcolona polygethes Turner, 1939
- Microcolona ponophora Meyrick, 1897
- Microcolona porota Meyrick, 1917
- Microcolona pycnitis Meyrick, 1915
- Microcolona sollennis Meyrick, 1897
- Microcolona spaniospila Turner, 1923
- Microcolona technographa Meyrick, 1928
- Microcolona thymopis Meyrick, 1897
- Microcolona toropis Meyrick, 1897
- Microcolona transennata Meyrick, 1922 (from Brazil & Peru)
- Microcolona trigonospila Meyrick, 1897
- Microcolona tumulifera Meyrick, 1921
