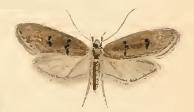
- Luquetia lobella

Scientific classification
- Kingdom: Animalia
- Phylum: Arthropoda
- Clade: Pancrustacea
- Class: Insecta
- Order: Lepidoptera
- Family: Depressariidae
- Subfamily: Depressariinae
- Genus: Luquetia; Leraut, 1991

= Luquetia =

Genus of moths

Luquetia is a moth genus of the superfamily Gelechioidea described by Patrice J.A. Leraut in 1991. It is mostly placed in the family Depressariidae, which is often – particularly in older treatments – considered a subfamily of the Oecophoridae or included in the Elachistidae.

== Species ==
- Luquetia lobella (Denis & Schiffermüller, 1775)
- Luquetia orientella (Rebel 1893)
