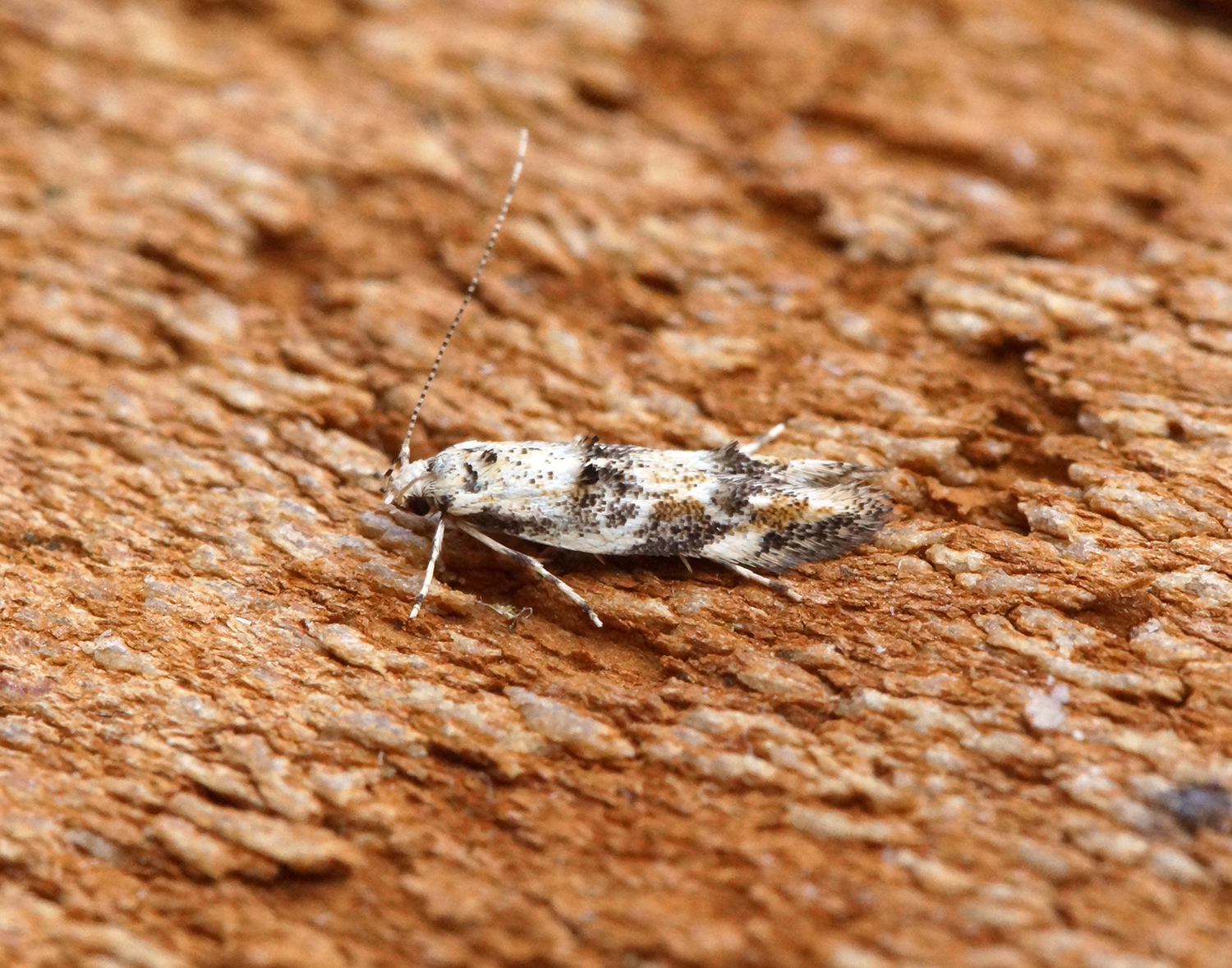
- Dystebenna stephensi

Scientific classification
- Kingdom: Animalia
- Phylum: Arthropoda
- Class: Insecta
- Order: Lepidoptera
- Family: Elachistidae
- Subfamily: Parametriotinae
- Genus: Dystebenna; Spuler, 1910
- Species: D. stephensi

Binomial name
- Dystebenna stephensi (Stainton, 1849)

Synonyms
- List: Elachista stephensi Stainton, 1849; Tebenna tesselatella Herrich-Schäffer, [1854]; Laverna stephensiella Doubleday, 1859

= Dystebenna =

Genus of moths

Dystebenna is a genus of moths of the family Elachistidae. The genus is mostly placed in the family Elachistidae, but other authors list it as a member of the family Agonoxenidae. It contains only one species Dystebenna stephensi, which is found in Asia and Europe.

== Description ==
The wingspan is 8–9 mm. Adults are on wing from the end of June to September and can be found resting on the trunk of the host tree.

The larvae feed on oak (Quercus species) and chestnut (Castanea species).

The species overwinters in the pupal stage within the mine.

== Distribution ==
Dystebenna stephensi is found in central Europe, Great Britain, southern Sweden, the Crimea and western Transcaucasia.
