= Microcolona phalarota =

Scientific classification
- Domain: Eukaryota
- Kingdom: Animalia
- Phylum: Arthropoda
- Class: Insecta
- Order: Lepidoptera
- Family: Elachistidae
- Genus: Microcolona
- Species: M. phalarota

Binomial name
- Microcolona phalarota Meyrick, 1915

Species of moth

Microcolona phalarota is a moth in the family Elachistidae. It is found in India (Assam).

The wingspan is 10–11 mm. The forewings are ochreous-brown with a narrow costal and median and broader dorsal streaks and the entire apical third of the wing dark grey, irrorated with blackish. There is an irregular ochreous-white blotch along the dorsum from the base to one-fourth of the wing, terminated by a large blackish tuft. There is a rounded ochreous-white blotch resting on the costa before the middle, containing an elongate black first discal stigma. There are leaden-metallic spots on the tornus and the middle of the termen, as well as a blackish-grey tuft in the disc between these. The hindwings are grey.
