= Microcolona tumulifera =

Scientific classification
- Kingdom: Animalia
- Phylum: Arthropoda
- Class: Insecta
- Order: Lepidoptera
- Family: Elachistidae
- Genus: Microcolona
- Species: M. tumulifera

Binomial name
- Microcolona tumulifera Meyrick, 1921

Species of moth

Microcolona tumulifera is a moth in the family Elachistidae. It is found on Java.

The wingspan is about 8 mm. The forewings are ochreous-brown, irregularly irrorated with blackish. There is a very large subdorsal tuft at one-third and a very small one in the disc before the middle, a moderate subdorsal tuft beyond the middle and a large transverse tuft mixed with whitish at three-fourths. The hindwings are pale grey.
