= Microcolona cricota =

Scientific classification
- Kingdom: Animalia
- Phylum: Arthropoda
- Class: Insecta
- Order: Lepidoptera
- Family: Elachistidae
- Genus: Microcolona
- Species: M. cricota

Binomial name
- Microcolona cricota Meyrick, 1917

Species of moth

Microcolona cricota is a moth in the family Elachistidae. It is found in southern India and Assam.

The wingspan is about 9 mm. The forewings are brownish-ochreous, irregularly sprinkled with blackish, sometimes forming a streak connecting discal tufts and a dorsal blotch before the middle. The base is tinged with ochreous whitish. There is an indistinct ochreous-whitish transverse line at one-fifth and a tuft mixed with black beneath the fold at one-fourth of the wing. There is a minute black dot circled with ochreous-whitish towards the costa at two-fifths. There is an elongate blackish mark along the costa at about two-thirds and an ochreous-whitish dot preceding a tuft towards the dorsum in the middle. There is also a tuft on the disc at three-fourths, edged posteriorly with black. Towards the apex, there are some scattered pale golden-metallic scales in the disc, as well as two small black dots on each margin. The hindwings are light grey.
