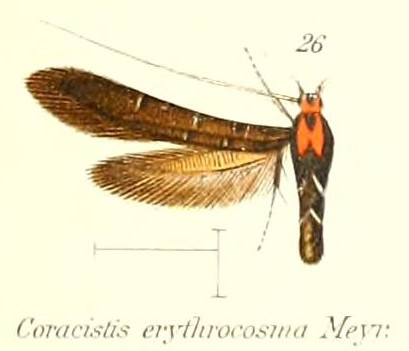

Scientific classification
- Kingdom: Animalia
- Phylum: Arthropoda
- Class: Insecta
- Order: Lepidoptera
- Family: Elachistidae
- Subfamily: Parametriotinae
- Genus: Coracistis; Meyrick, 1897
- Species: C. erythrocosma

Binomial name
- Coracistis erythrocosma Meyrick, 1897

= Coracistis =

Genus of moths

Coracistis is a monotypic moth genus in the family Elachistidae. Its only species, Coracistis erythrocosma, is found in Australia, where it has been recorded from Victoria. Both the genus and species were first described by Edward Meyrick in 1897. It

The wingspan is 21–22 mm. The forewings are blackish fuscous, coppery tinged posteriorly. The scale tufts are shining purple anteriorly. The hindwings are dark fuscous, tinged with bronzy.
