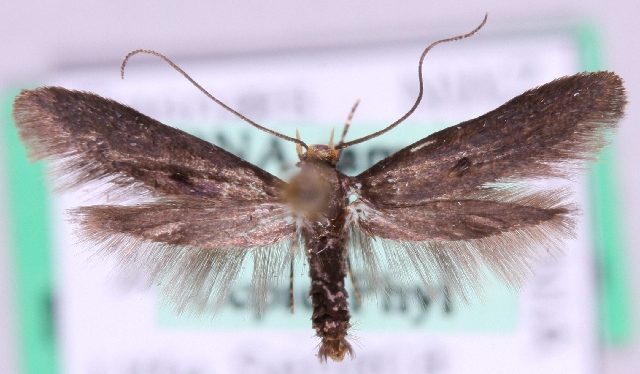
- Spuleria flavicaput

Scientific classification
- Kingdom: Animalia
- Phylum: Arthropoda
- Clade: Pancrustacea
- Class: Insecta
- Order: Lepidoptera
- Family: Elachistidae
- Subfamily: Parametriotinae; Capuse, 1971

Synonyms
- Parametriotidae Capuse, 1971; Blastodacnidae Clarke, 1962 (unavail.); Blastodacnidae Sinev, 1979 (disputed); Lamprysticinae Lvovsky, 1996

= Parametriotinae =

Subfamily of moths

Parametriotinae is a subfamily of moths in the family Elachistidae.

== Genera ==
- Araucarivora Hodges, 1997
- Auxotricha Meyrick, 1931
- Blastodacna Wocke in Heinemann & Wocke, 1876
- Chrysoclista Stainton, 1854
- Coracistis Meyrick, 1897
- Dystebenna Spuler, 1910
- Glaucacna Forbes, 1931
- Haplochrois Meyrick, 1897
- Heinemannia Wocke in Heinemann & Wocke, 1876
- Homoeoprepes Walsingham, 1909
- Microcolona Meyrick, 1897
- Pammeces Zeller, 1863
- Spuleria Hofmann, 1898
- Tocasta Busck, 1912
- Zaratha Walker, 1864

== Former genera ==
- Leptozestis Meyrick, 1924
- Trachydora Meyrick, 1897
