= Microcolona dorochares =

Scientific classification
- Kingdom: Animalia
- Phylum: Arthropoda
- Class: Insecta
- Order: Lepidoptera
- Family: Elachistidae
- Genus: Microcolona
- Species: M. dorochares

Binomial name
- Microcolona dorochares Meyrick, 1927

Species of moth

Microcolona dorochares is a moth in the family Elachistidae. It is found on Samoa.
