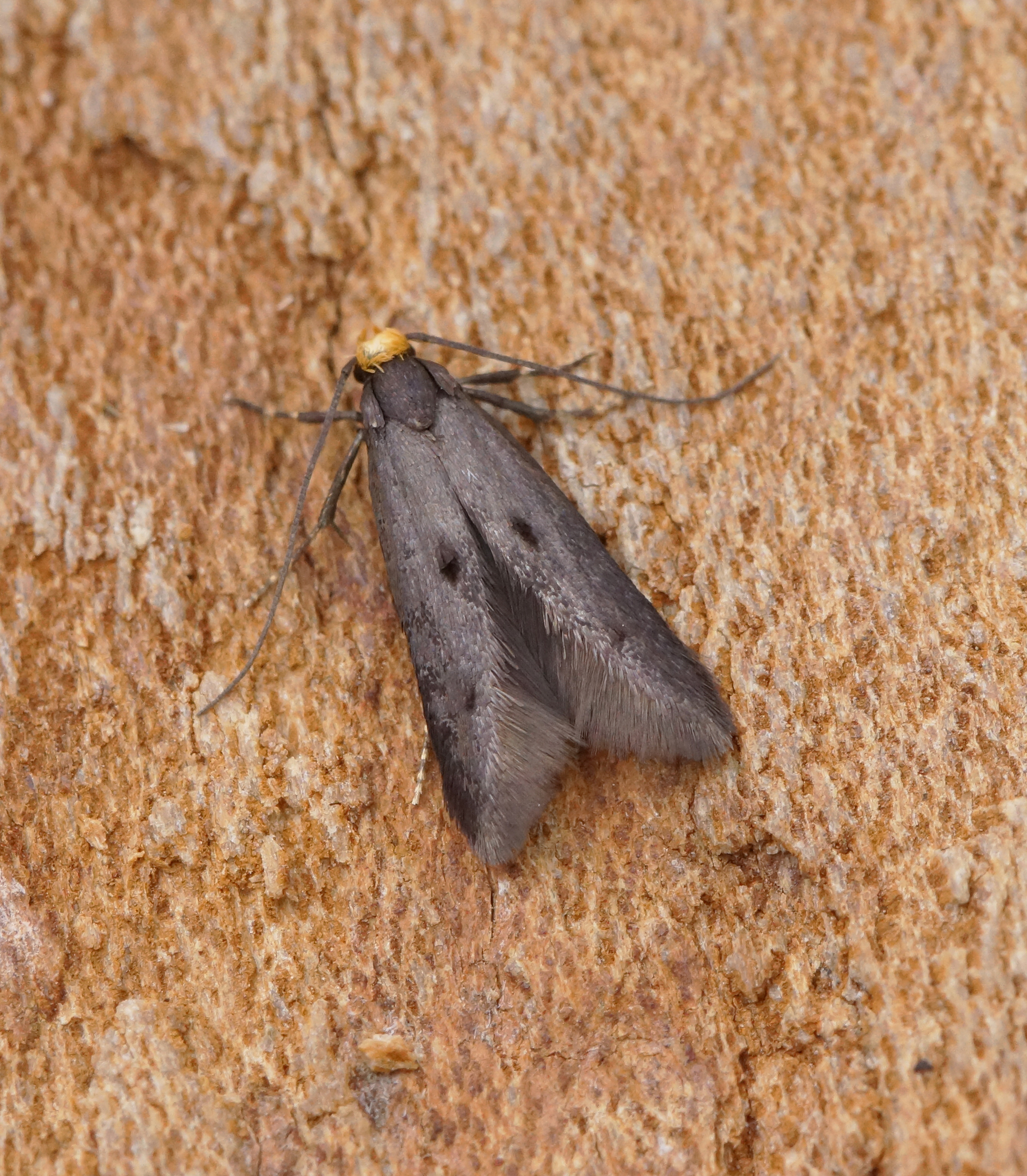

Scientific classification
- Domain: Eukaryota
- Kingdom: Animalia
- Phylum: Arthropoda
- Class: Insecta
- Order: Lepidoptera
- Family: Elachistidae
- Subfamily: Parametriotinae
- Genus: Spuleria; Hofmann, 1897
- Species: S. flavicaput

Binomial name
- Spuleria flavicaput (Haworth, 1828)

Synonyms
- List: Porrectaria flavicaput Haworth, 1828; Chrysoclista flavicaput; Tinea aurifrontella Geyer, [1832]; Rösler[s]tammia aurocapitella Bruand, [1851]; Chrysoclysta flavicapitella Doubleday, 1859

= Spuleria =

Genus of moths

Spuleria is a genus of moths of the family Elachistidae. It contains only one species Spuleria flavicaput, which is found in most of Europe and Anatolia. The larvae mine the twigs of hawthorns.

== Taxonomy ==
Some authors list the genus as a synonym of Chrysoclista. If valid, the genus is mostly placed in the family Elachistidae, but other authors list it as a member of the family Agonoxenidae, Cosmopterigidae or Blastodacnidae.

The genus Spuleria was raised by the German entomologist Ottmar Hofmann in 1897, in honour of Arnold Spuler; also a German entomologist. Adrian Hardy Haworth gave the moth the specific name flavicaput in 1828, from ″flavus″ – yellow and ″caput″ – the head, which describes the adult. The type specimen was found in England at Battersea Fields, London.

== Description of Spuleria flavicaput ==
The wingspan is 12–14 mm. The head is orange-yellow. Palpi yellow, basal half blackish, terminal joint very short. Forewings are purplish-black; plical and second discal stigmata black, raised. Hindwings are dark fuscous. The larva is slender and whitish with the head and anal plates dark brown.

== Biology ==
Adults are diurnal, i.e. flying in the morning from May to June, around the larval food plant. The moths lay their eggs, in July and August, on a small twig of hawthorn (Crataegus monogyna) and midland hawthorn (Crataegus laevigata); at the base of a small side shoot. The twigs are the thickness of a knitting needle and larvae start boring into the pith at a fork towards the tip. The gallery follows the pith and is approximately 3 centimetres (1.2 in) long, broad with blackish walls. At the end it turns towards the outside of the twig, usually on the underside. Larvae mine the twigs from August to October. The only indication of a mine is an exit hole, which is oval and about 3 mm wide and partly covered by a thin covering of bark; there is no sign of frass in the gallery or extruding from the exit hole. Before pupation the larva closes the gallery near the exit hole with a web. At the other end of the mine, the larva makes a broader section in the gallery which can partly enter the main twig and pupation takes place there before winter.
