= Nodata =

Nodata may refer to:

- A lack of data
- Benimakia nodata, a species of sea snail
- Microcolona nodata, a species of moth
- Pilsbryspira nodata, a species of sea snail
