= Homoeoprepes felisae =

Scientific classification
- Domain: Eukaryota
- Kingdom: Animalia
- Phylum: Arthropoda
- Class: Insecta
- Order: Lepidoptera
- Family: Elachistidae
- Genus: Homoeoprepes
- Species: H. felisae

Binomial name
- Homoeoprepes felisae Clarke, 1962

Synonyms
- Mompha felisae Clarke, 1962

Species of moth

Homoeoprepes felisae is a moth in the family Elachistidae. It was described by Clarke in 1962. It is found in Colombia.

The wingspan is 24–27 mm. The forewings are fuscous with slight reddish violet luster. There is a small ochreous white spot at the apical fourth. There are seven groups of raised scales at the apical fourth. The hindwings are grey with a brassy hue.
