= Microcolona eriptila =

Scientific classification
- Kingdom: Animalia
- Phylum: Arthropoda
- Class: Insecta
- Order: Lepidoptera
- Family: Elachistidae
- Genus: Microcolona
- Species: M. eriptila

Binomial name
- Microcolona eriptila Meyrick, 1915

Species of moth

Microcolona eriptila is a moth in the family Elachistidae. It is found in southern India.

The wingspan is about 7 mm. The forewings are brown, densely irrorated with blackish. There is a very large tuft above the dorsum at one-third of the wing and one at the disc at three-fourths. The first discal stigma is black surrounded by an ochreous-whitish ring, rather obliquely beyond the first tuft. The hindwings are grey.
