= Microcolona porota =

Scientific classification
- Kingdom: Animalia
- Phylum: Arthropoda
- Class: Insecta
- Order: Lepidoptera
- Family: Elachistidae
- Genus: Microcolona
- Species: M. porota

Binomial name
- Microcolona porota Meyrick, 1917

Species of moth

Microcolona porota is a moth in the family Elachistidae. It is found in India (Assam).

The wingspan is 10–12 mm. The forewings are brown with a tuft of scales mixed with dark fuscous and blackish towards the dorsum at two-fifths and another in the disc at three-fourths. There is an indistinct spot of dark fuscous irroration towards the costa at two-thirds. There is an elongate mark of dark fuscous irroration on the costa at two-thirds. There are a few scattered blackish scales in the disc and towards the apex. The hindwings are grey.
