= Microcolona technographa =

Scientific classification
- Domain: Eukaryota
- Kingdom: Animalia
- Phylum: Arthropoda
- Class: Insecta
- Order: Lepidoptera
- Family: Elachistidae
- Genus: Microcolona
- Species: M. technographa

Binomial name
- Microcolona technographa Meyrick, 1928

Species of moth

Microcolona technographa is a moth in the family Elachistidae. It is found in north-eastern India.

The wingspan is about 10 mm. The forewings are brownish-fuscous, with a slender blackish-grey streak along the basal third of the costa, interrupted in the middle by a whitish dot. A blotch of whitish suffusion occupies the dorsal half from the base to one-third and there is a whitish oval ring in the disc slightly before the middle, from which a slender blackish-grey streak extends to the end of the cell. There is also a dark elongate blotch along the posterior half of the dorsum, anteriorly with a large tuft and edged by whitish suffusion. There is an oblique whitish strigula from the costa beyond the middle and a dark grey rounded or transverse blotch resting on the middle of the termen, edged above by an oblique white line. There is also a blackish-grey blotch crossing the wing just before the apex. The hindwings are dark grey with a pale or whitish base.

The larvae feed on Psidium guajava. They bore in the tender shoots of their host plant and pupate within the feeding tunnel.
