= Microcolona pantominia =

Scientific classification
- Kingdom: Animalia
- Phylum: Arthropoda
- Clade: Pancrustacea
- Class: Insecta
- Order: Lepidoptera
- Family: Elachistidae
- Genus: Microcolona
- Species: M. pantominia

Binomial name
- Microcolona pantominia Meyrick, 1917

Species of moth

Microcolona pantominia is a moth in the family Elachistidae first described by Edward Meyrick in 1917. It is found in the Central African Republic and South Africa.

The wingspan is 16–17 mm. The forewings are ochreous brown with a pale yellow basal fascia with a dark fuscous costal edge. There are four roundish pale yellow spots containing tufts and there are dark fuscous spots on the costa at two-thirds and the dorsum before the tornus, each preceded by a pale yellow spot. There is an irregular pale yellow mark before the apex. The hindwings are dark fuscous.

The larvae feed on Terminalia sericea.
