= Microcolona emporica =

Scientific classification
- Kingdom: Animalia
- Phylum: Arthropoda
- Class: Insecta
- Order: Lepidoptera
- Family: Elachistidae
- Genus: Microcolona
- Species: M. emporica

Binomial name
- Microcolona emporica Meyrick, 1917

Species of moth

Microcolona emporica is a moth in the family Elachistidae. It is found in Sri Lanka.

The wingspan is about 12 mm. The forewings are brownish-ochreous, somewhat sprinkled irregularly with blackish. There is a patch of blackish suffusion extending along the costa from the base to two-thirds. The hindwings are dark grey.
