= Microcolona omphalias =

Scientific classification
- Kingdom: Animalia
- Phylum: Arthropoda
- Clade: Pancrustacea
- Class: Insecta
- Order: Lepidoptera
- Family: Elachistidae
- Genus: Microcolona
- Species: M. omphalias

Binomial name
- Microcolona omphalias Meyrick, 1913

Species of moth

Microcolona omphalias is a moth in the family Elachistidae. It is found in South Africa, where it has been recorded from Mpumalanga.
