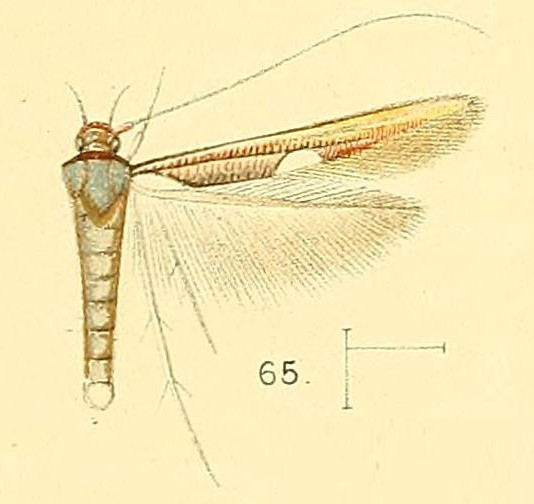

Scientific classification
- Domain: Eukaryota
- Kingdom: Animalia
- Phylum: Arthropoda
- Class: Insecta
- Order: Lepidoptera
- Family: Elachistidae
- Genus: Zaratha
- Species: Z. muricicoma

Binomial name
- Zaratha muricicoma Walsingham, 1891

= Zaratha muricicoma =

Species of moth

Zaratha muricicoma is a moth of the family Elachistidae. It was described by Lord Walsingham in 1891 and is found in western Africa.
