= Homoeoprepes sympatrica =

Scientific classification
- Domain: Eukaryota
- Kingdom: Animalia
- Phylum: Arthropoda
- Class: Insecta
- Order: Lepidoptera
- Family: Elachistidae
- Genus: Homoeoprepes
- Species: H. sympatrica

Binomial name
- Homoeoprepes sympatrica Clarke, 1962

Synonyms
- Mompha sympatrica Clarke, 1962

Species of moth

Homoeoprepes sympatrica is a moth in the family Elachistidae. It was described by Clarke in 1962. It is found in Colombia.

The wingspan is 18–19 mm. The forewings are fuscous, overlaid by rust red. At the base of the fold with a small black spot and a similar spot at the basal fifth on the fold. Similar black spots of raised scales are found at two-fifths, in the cell and at the end of the cell. These spots are surrounded by red and ochreous scales. The hindwings are shining greyish, paler basally.
