= Deuterogonia =

Scientific classification
- Kingdom: Animalia
- Phylum: Arthropoda
- Clade: Pancrustacea
- Class: Insecta
- Order: Lepidoptera
- Family: Oecophoridae
- Subfamily: Deuterogoniinae
- Genus: Deuterogonia; Rebel, 1901
- Species: D. pudorina

Binomial name
- Deuterogonia pudorina (Wocke, 1857)

Synonyms
- Gelechia pudorina Wocke, 1857

Genus of moths

Deuterogonia is a monotypic genus of moths in the family Oecophoridae described by Rebel in 1901. Its only species, Deuterogonia pudorina, was described by Wocke in 1857 as Gelechia pudorina.

The species is native to Eurasia.
