= Microcolona celaenospila =

Scientific classification
- Domain: Eukaryota
- Kingdom: Animalia
- Phylum: Arthropoda
- Class: Insecta
- Order: Lepidoptera
- Family: Elachistidae
- Genus: Microcolona
- Species: M. celaenospila

Binomial name
- Microcolona celaenospila Turner, 1916

Species of moth

Microcolona celaenospila is a moth in the family Elachistidae. It was described by Alfred Jefferis Turner in 1916. It is found in Australia, where it has been recorded from New South Wales.

The wingspan is 9–10 mm. The forewings are whitish, suffused with grey (especially towards the costa) and with dark fuscous irroration. There is a blackish discal spot which is narrowly ringed with whitish. There is a second spot preceding the first on the fold and a third in the disc at three-fourths. There is also a blackish apical dot surrounded with whitish. The hindwings are grey.
