= Microperittia =

Scientific classification
- Kingdom: Animalia
- Phylum: Arthropoda
- Class: Insecta
- Order: Lepidoptera
- Family: Elachistidae
- Genus: †Microperittia; Kozlov, 1987
- Species: †M. proboscifera

Binomial name
- †Microperittia proboscifera Kozlov, 1987

Extinct genus of moths

Microperittia is an extinct genus of moths in the family Elachistidae. It was described by Kozlov in 1987. It contains the species M. proboscifera, which was described from Baltic amber, more specifically Priabonian terrestrial amber in the Russian Federation.
