= Aeolanthes oculigera =

Scientific classification
- Domain: Eukaryota
- Kingdom: Animalia
- Phylum: Arthropoda
- Class: Insecta
- Order: Lepidoptera
- Family: Depressariidae
- Genus: Aeolanthes
- Species: A. oculigera

Binomial name
- Aeolanthes oculigera Diakonoff, 1952

Species of moth

Aeolanthes oculigera is a moth in the family Depressariidae. It was described by Alexey Diakonoff in 1952. It is found in Burma.
