= Microcolona sollennis =

Scientific classification
- Kingdom: Animalia
- Phylum: Arthropoda
- Class: Insecta
- Order: Lepidoptera
- Family: Elachistidae
- Genus: Microcolona
- Species: M. sollennis

Binomial name
- Microcolona sollennis Meyrick, 1897

Species of moth

Microcolona sollennis is a moth in the family Elachistidae. It was described by Edward Meyrick in 1897. It is found in Australia, where it has been recorded from New South Wales.

The wingspan is 8–12 mm. The forewings are fuscous, irrorated (sprinkled) with dark fuscous, with a few irregular whitish scales and a blackish basal median dot. The stigmata is rather large, raised, black and partially whitish edged. The first discal before the middle, the second at three-fourths and the plical is large, somewhat obliquely before the first discal. There is a small black dot beneath the second discal. The hindwings are fuscous.
