= Aeolanthes lychnidias =

Scientific classification
- Kingdom: Animalia
- Phylum: Arthropoda
- Class: Insecta
- Order: Lepidoptera
- Family: Depressariidae
- Genus: Aeolanthes
- Species: A. lychnidias

Binomial name
- Aeolanthes lychnidias Meyrick, 1908

Species of moth

Aeolanthes lychnidias is a moth in the family Depressariidae. It was described by Edward Meyrick in 1908. It is found in southern India.

The wingspan is about 22 mm. The forewings are pale whitish-yellowish with the basal area mixed with brown, with an orange tuft near the base in the middle, and a larger brown tuft mixed with dark fuscous near the dorsum. Beyond this, there is a broad undefined fascia of blackish and whitish irroration from one-third of the costa to the middle of the dorsum, the costal projecting scales mixed with pale rosy. A subovate white spot is found in the disc beyond the middle outlined with black irroration and centred with a yellow spot. Beyond this is a trapezoidal patch of whitish and black irroration, of which one angle rests on the costa beyond the middle and one projects strongly towards the apex. The apical area beyond this is ferruginous-brown, including a white apical spot produced along the termen, its anterior edge rosy-tinged. There is also a tornal patch of ground colour partially tinged with pale rosy. The hindwings are pale yellowish.
