= Lamprozela metadesmia =

Scientific classification
- Kingdom: Animalia
- Phylum: Arthropoda
- Class: Insecta
- Order: Lepidoptera
- Family: Heliozelidae
- Genus: Lamprozela
- Species: L. metadesmia

Binomial name
- Lamprozela metadesmia Meyrick, 1934

Species of moth

Lamprozela metadesmia is a moth of the Heliozelidae family. It was described by Edward Meyrick in 1934. It is found on Java.
