= Microcolona embolopis =

Scientific classification
- Kingdom: Animalia
- Phylum: Arthropoda
- Class: Insecta
- Order: Lepidoptera
- Family: Elachistidae
- Genus: Microcolona
- Species: M. embolopis

Binomial name
- Microcolona embolopis Meyrick, 1897

Species of moth

Microcolona embolopis is a moth in the family Elachistidae. It was described by Edward Meyrick in 1897. It is found in Australia, where it has been recorded from Queensland.

The wingspan is about 11 mm. The forewings are whitish ochreous, somewhat sprinkled with dark fuscous. There is a very small dark fuscous raised dot beneath the fold before one-third and the stigmata is very small, raised and black. There is a transverse raised black dot beneath the second discal and a sharply defined semi-oval dark fuscous blotch on the costa at two-thirds. The hindwings are grey.
