= Aeolanthes rhodochrysa =

Scientific classification
- Kingdom: Animalia
- Phylum: Arthropoda
- Class: Insecta
- Order: Lepidoptera
- Family: Depressariidae
- Genus: Aeolanthes
- Species: A. rhodochrysa

Binomial name
- Aeolanthes rhodochrysa Meyrick, 1907

Species of moth

Aeolanthes rhodochrysa is a moth in the family Depressariidae. It was described by Edward Meyrick in 1907. It is found in India (Assam).

The wingspan is 18–19 mm. The forewings are deep orange-ochreous suffused with yellow, and partially tinged with crimson. There is an oblique spot of crimson suffusion in the disc towards the base and a broad curved oblique whitish fascia from the costa before the middle, suffused with yellowish posteriorly, becoming broken up in the disc and not reaching the dorsum. Beyond this is a narrower fascia of purplish-crimson suffusion, the edges irregularly dentate and marked with dark fuscous, obsolete towards the dorsum, an acute median projection of the posterior edge followed by some whitish suffusion. There is also a pale crimson streak mixed with white around the apex and tornus. The hindwings are pale grey, darker towards the tornus.
