= Aeolanthes callidora =

Scientific classification
- Kingdom: Animalia
- Phylum: Arthropoda
- Class: Insecta
- Order: Lepidoptera
- Family: Depressariidae
- Genus: Aeolanthes
- Species: A. callidora

Binomial name
- Aeolanthes callidora Meyrick, 1907

Species of moth

Aeolanthes callidora is a moth in the family Depressariidae. It was described by Edward Meyrick in 1907 and is found in India (Assam).

The wingspan is 21–24 mm. The forewings are deep orange-ochreous, more orange towards the costa and a narrow white median longitudinal streak from near the base to the middle, edged with grey, the space between this and the costa broadly suffused with white, towards the costal scale-protuberance white mixed with leaden-grey. There is a dark red-brown streak along the dorsum from near the base to three-fourths, edged with purplish-grey suffusion, and posteriorly dilated into a triangular spot edged with white. There is a transverse discal mark at three-fifths and some irregular suffused spots between the veins beyond and above this pale yellow. An oblique white mark is found beneath the costa towards the apex and two or three dots beneath it, preceded by some red-brown suffusion. Between this and the apex is some leaden-grey suffusion beneath the costa and there is an irregular interrupted white streak along the termen. The hindwings are pale greyish-ochreous, with fine scattered dark fuscous hair-scales, especially towards the tornus.
