= Aeolanthes meniscias =

Scientific classification
- Domain: Eukaryota
- Kingdom: Animalia
- Phylum: Arthropoda
- Class: Insecta
- Order: Lepidoptera
- Family: Depressariidae
- Genus: Aeolanthes
- Species: A. meniscias

Binomial name
- Aeolanthes meniscias Meyrick, 1918

Species of moth

Aeolanthes meniscias is a moth of the family Depressariidae. It is found in Burma.

The wingspan is about 25 mm. The forewings are pale ochreous-yellowish, whitish-tinged towards the costa in the middle and with the base mixed ferruginous in the middle and towards the costa. There are some ferruginous scales forming a very oblique series from the costa before one-third and there is a lilac-brownish band occupying the dorsal area as far as the cell to the tornus, streaked darker ochreous-brown on the margins of the cell, the fold and the dorsum, the dorsal streak thicker and enlarged before the tornus into a triangular prominence suffused ferruginous. A curved dark ferruginous-brown streak crosses the end of the cell and is prolonged towards the apex, enclosing a fine whitish lunule on the transverse vein, and followed by an ovate pale yellow spot indistinctly edged posteriorly ferruginous-brown. The veins between these markings and the termen are marked with fine dark brown lines and there is a fine dark brown terminal line. The hindwings are light yellowish, the basal third suffused light greyish.
