= Microcolona ponophora =

Scientific classification
- Kingdom: Animalia
- Phylum: Arthropoda
- Class: Insecta
- Order: Lepidoptera
- Family: Elachistidae
- Genus: Microcolona
- Species: M. ponophora

Binomial name
- Microcolona ponophora Meyrick, 1897

Species of moth

Microcolona ponophora is a moth in the family Elachistidae. It was described by Edward Meyrick in 1897. It is found in Australia, where it has been recorded from New South Wales.

The wingspan is 8–9 mm. The forewings are brown, irregularly sprinkled with dark fuscous. There is a broad whitish patch extending along the basal two-thirds of the dorsum and a small whitish spot on the middle of the dorsum and another before the tornus, separated by dark fuscous suffusion. The discal stigmata is black, raised and partially whitish edged, first in middle, second at three-fourths. There is a small ochreous-whitish oblique-triangular spot on the costa before two-thirds, preceded and followed by patches of dark fuscous suffusion. There are two or three black dots longitudinally placed towards the apex. The hindwings are fuscous.
