= Palaeoelachista =

Scientific classification
- Domain: Eukaryota
- Kingdom: Animalia
- Phylum: Arthropoda
- Class: Insecta
- Order: Lepidoptera
- Family: Elachistidae
- Genus: †Palaeoelachista; Kozlov, 1987
- Species: †P. traugottolseni

Binomial name
- †Palaeoelachista traugottolseni Kozlov, 1987

Extinct genus of moths

Palaeoelachista is an extinct genus of moths in the family Elachistidae. It was described by Kozlov in 1987. It contains the species P. traugottolseni, which was described from Baltic amber in the Russian Federation. It is dated to the Eocene.
