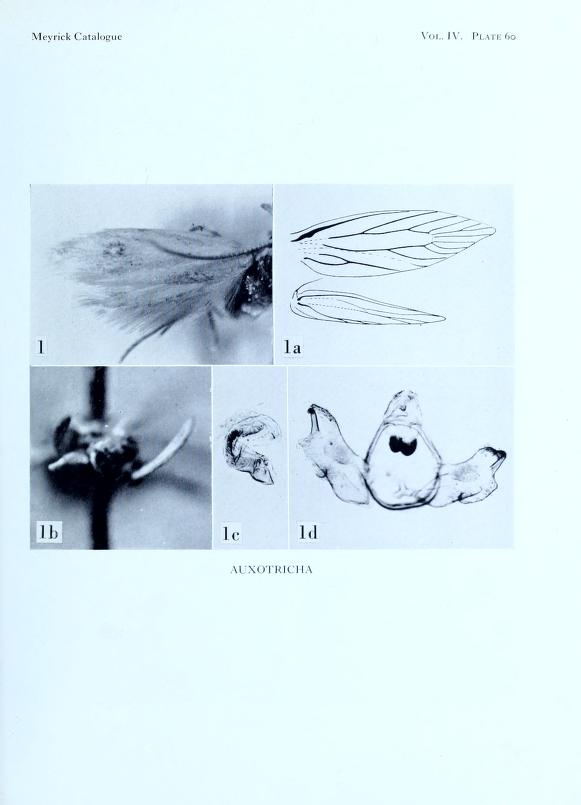
- Figure 1, left wings; 1a, venation (vein structure) of right wings; 1b, frontal view of palpus; 1c, lateral aspect of aedeagus; 1d, ventral view of male genitalia with aedeagus removed.

Scientific classification
- Kingdom: Animalia
- Phylum: Arthropoda
- Class: Insecta
- Order: Lepidoptera
- Family: Elachistidae
- Subfamily: Parametriotinae
- Genus: Auxotricha; Meyrick, 1931
- Species: A. ochrogypsa

Binomial name
- Auxotricha ochrogypsa Meyrick, 1931

= Auxotricha =

Species of moth

Auxotricha ochrogypsa is a moth in the family Elachistidae or Oechophoridae, and the only species in the genus Auxotricha. It was described by Edward Meyrick in 1931 from 3 specimens. It is found in the Iquitos region of Peru.
