= Aeolanthes cyclantha =

Scientific classification
- Kingdom: Animalia
- Phylum: Arthropoda
- Class: Insecta
- Order: Lepidoptera
- Family: Depressariidae
- Genus: Aeolanthes
- Species: A. cyclantha

Binomial name
- Aeolanthes cyclantha Meyrick, 1923

Species of moth

Aeolanthes cyclantha is a moth in the family Depressariidae. It was described by Edward Meyrick in 1923. It is found in southern India.

The wingspan is about 22 mm. The forewings are dark fuscous partially suffused light crimson-rosy, with irregularly strewn suffused yellow-ochreous spots and blotches partially tinged crimson, the largest blotch resting on the antemedian costal scale-projection, a distinct round spot in the disc beyond the middle. The hindwings are dark fuscous.
