= Microcolona epixutha =

Scientific classification
- Kingdom: Animalia
- Phylum: Arthropoda
- Class: Insecta
- Order: Lepidoptera
- Family: Elachistidae
- Genus: Microcolona
- Species: M. epixutha

Binomial name
- Microcolona epixutha Meyrick, 1897

Species of moth

Microcolona epixutha is a moth in the family Elachistidae. It was described by Edward Meyrick in 1897. It is found in Australia, where it has been recorded from New South Wales.

The wingspan is 6–8 mm. The forewings are reddish-ochreous, irregularly mixed with whitish, irrorated on the margins and sometimes also towards the middle of the disc with dark fuscous. There is a black basal median dot and the stigmata is raised and black. There is dark fuscous costal suffusion towards two-thirds. The hindwings are fuscous.
