= Microcolona polygethes =

Scientific classification
- Kingdom: Animalia
- Phylum: Arthropoda
- Class: Insecta
- Order: Lepidoptera
- Family: Elachistidae
- Genus: Microcolona
- Species: M. polygethes

Binomial name
- Microcolona polygethes Turner, 1939

Species of moth

Microcolona polygethes is a moth in the family Elachistidae. It was described by Alfred Jefferis Turner in 1939. It is found in Australia, where it has been recorded from Tasmania.
