= Aeolanthes dicraea =

Scientific classification
- Kingdom: Animalia
- Phylum: Arthropoda
- Class: Insecta
- Order: Lepidoptera
- Family: Depressariidae
- Genus: Aeolanthes
- Species: A. dicraea

Binomial name
- Aeolanthes dicraea Meyrick, 1908

Species of moth

Aeolanthes dicraea is a moth in the family Depressariidae. It was described by Edward Meyrick in 1908. It is found in India (Assam).

The wingspan is 20–22 mm. The forewings are white, towards the costa irregularly suffused with pale yellowish and with the basal third of the costa ferruginous-yellow. There is a ferruginous subcostal dash before the middle and an elongate patch of yellow suffusion in the middle of the disc, as well as a reddish-brown dorsal patch extending from the base to near the tornus, and reaching nearly half across the wing, containing a triangular dark reddish-brown dorsal spot at three-fourths, partially whitish-edged. There is a ferruginous-yellow suffusion along the posterior half of the costa, with a black mark beneath it near the apex and veins 5 and 6 are marked with reddish-brown lines becoming blackish posteriorly, vein 4 less distinctly lined with brownish, between veins 5-7 two light ferruginous-brown streaks, sometimes partially yellowish-suffused, between 4 and 5 a yellowish streak, and on tornus a deep yellow elongate patch. There is also a fine blackish line along the termen. The hindwings are grey, the apex sometimes suffused with whitish-yellowish.
