= Aeolanthes deltogramma =

Scientific classification
- Domain: Eukaryota
- Kingdom: Animalia
- Phylum: Arthropoda
- Class: Insecta
- Order: Lepidoptera
- Family: Depressariidae
- Genus: Aeolanthes
- Species: A. deltogramma

Binomial name
- Aeolanthes deltogramma Meyrick, 1923

Species of moth

Aeolanthes deltogramma is a moth in the family Depressariidae. It was described by Edward Meyrick in 1923. It is found in India (Assam).

The wingspan is about 25 mm. The forewings are deep ochreous, somewhat greyish-tinged in the disc, greyer-suffused towards the dorsum, on the costal third ochreous orange, the veins more or less lined ferruginous. There are two superimposed elongate light yellow spots beneath the middle of the costa and a spot of ferruginous suffusion on the end of the cell, containing a minute white dot, and followed by two light yellow spots surrounded by ferruginous suffusion and some slight dark fuscous irroration. There is a triangular ferruginous subdorsal spot beneath the end of the cell, finely edged laterally white, the anterior edge extended as a fine white subdorsal line halfway to the base. There are streaks of fuscous suffusion mixed silvery-white between veins 9-11 towards the costa and a large equilateral triangular white blotch resting on the upper two-thirds of the termen, limited above by vein 8 and cut by ferruginous lines on 5 and 6. The terminal edge is finely blackish. The hindwings are ochreous-whitish thinly strewn with grey hair-scales. The veins are grey.
