= Microcolona leptopis =

Scientific classification
- Kingdom: Animalia
- Phylum: Arthropoda
- Class: Insecta
- Order: Lepidoptera
- Family: Elachistidae
- Genus: Microcolona
- Species: M. leptopis

Binomial name
- Microcolona leptopis Meyrick, 1897

Species of moth

Microcolona leptopis is a moth in the family Elachistidae. It was described by Edward Meyrick in 1897. It is found in Australia, where it has been recorded from Western Australia.

The wingspan is about 8 mm. The forewings are ochreous, suffusedly mixed with white, and irrorated with black. There is a clear white longitudinal streak from the base beneath the costa to the second discal stigma, edged above by an irregular clear bright ochreous streak. The stigmata is raised, black and the first discal is placed in the middle of the white longitudinal streak, while the plical is directly below it. The second discal is large. The hindwings are light grey.
