= Praemendesia =

Scientific classification
- Kingdom: Animalia
- Phylum: Arthropoda
- Class: Insecta
- Order: Lepidoptera
- Family: Elachistidae
- Genus: †Praemendesia; Kozlov, 1987
- Species: †P. minima

Binomial name
- †Praemendesia minima Kozlov, 1987

Extinct genus of moths

Praemendesia is an extinct genus of moths in the family Elachistidae. It was described by Kozlov in 1987. It contains the species P. minima, which was described from Baltic amber in Russia. It is dated to the Eocene.
