= Aeolanthes euryatma =

Scientific classification
- Domain: Eukaryota
- Kingdom: Animalia
- Phylum: Arthropoda
- Class: Insecta
- Order: Lepidoptera
- Family: Depressariidae
- Genus: Aeolanthes
- Species: A. euryatma

Binomial name
- Aeolanthes euryatma Meyrick, 1908

Species of moth

Aeolanthes euryatma is a moth in the family Depressariidae. It was described by Edward Meyrick in 1908. It is found in Assam, India.

The wingspan is about 17 mm. The forewings are white, mixed towards the termen with light grey and towards the tornus with pale ochreous yellowish and there are two dark fuscous patches mixed with deep indigo purplish and blackish. The first basal, extending on the costa to beyond one-third and on the dorsum to three-fourths, the outer edge prominent at three-fourths from the costa. The second is subtriangular extending on the costa from the middle to near the apex, its apex almost connected with prominence of the first. There is an interrupted dark fuscous terminal line. The hindwings are pale yellowish, towards the dorsum greyish tinged.
