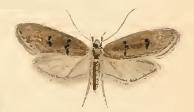

Scientific classification
- Domain: Eukaryota
- Kingdom: Animalia
- Phylum: Arthropoda
- Class: Insecta
- Order: Lepidoptera
- Family: Depressariidae
- Genus: Luquetia
- Species: L. lobella

Binomial name
- Luquetia lobella (Denis & Schiffermüller, 1775)

Synonyms
- Tinea lobella Denis & Schiffermuller, 1775; Enicostoma lobella; Pyralis thunbergana Fabricius, 1787; Haemylis lugubrella Duponchel, 1838

= Luquetia lobella =

Species of moth

Luquetia lobella is a moth of the family Depressariidae. It is found in most of Europe, except Ireland, the Iberian Peninsula, Finland, Estonia and most of the Balkan Peninsula.

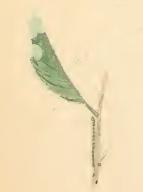
A sloe leaf folded downwards by larva

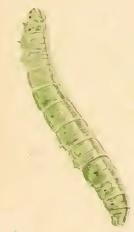
Larva

The wingspan is 23–26 mm. Adults are on wing in June.

The larvae feed on blackthorn (Prunus spinosa), hawthorn (Crataegus species) and Sorbus species.
