= Lamprozela desmophanes =

Scientific classification
- Kingdom: Animalia
- Phylum: Arthropoda
- Class: Insecta
- Order: Lepidoptera
- Family: Heliozelidae
- Genus: Lamprozela
- Species: L. desmophanes

Binomial name
- Lamprozela desmophanes Meyrick, 1922

Species of moth

Lamprozela desmophanes is a moth of the Heliozelidae family. It was described by Edward Meyrick in 1922. It is found in India.
