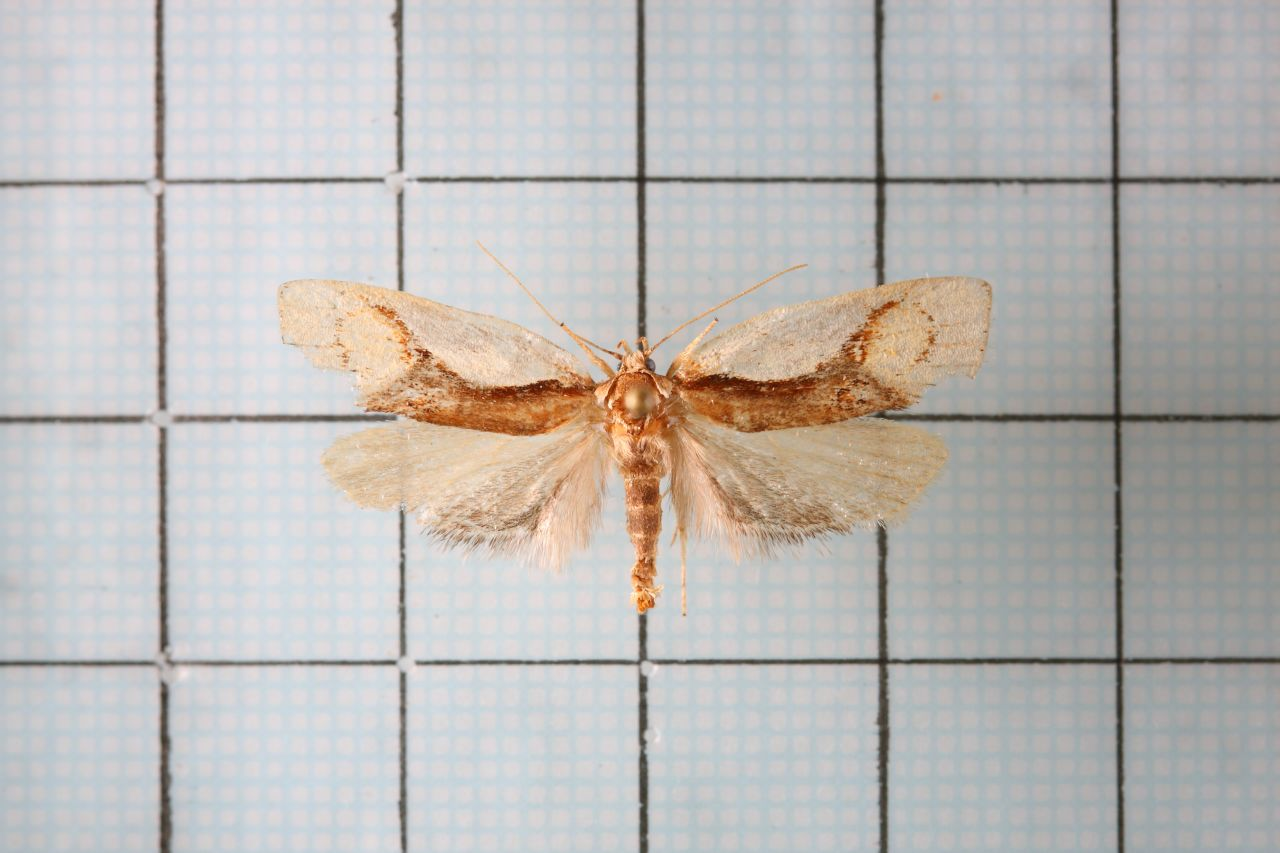
- Aeolanthes brochias

Scientific classification
- Kingdom: Animalia
- Phylum: Arthropoda
- Class: Insecta
- Order: Lepidoptera
- Family: Depressariidae
- Subfamily: Aeolanthinae; Kuznetzov & Stekolnikov, 1984
- Genus: Aeolanthes; Meyrick, 1907

= Aeolanthes =

Genus of moths

Aeolanthes is a genus of small moths in the superfamily Gelechioidea.

Its relationships are enigmatic – many authors separate it in a monotypic subfamily Aeolanthinae, but there is disagreement over whether to place them in the Elachistidae, Lecithoceridae or Oecophoridae. Recent studies place it in the Depressariidae.

== Species ==
- Aeolanthes ampelurga Meyrick, 1925
- Aeolanthes brochias Meyrick, 1938
- Aeolanthes callidora Meyrick, 1907
- Aeolanthes ceratopis Meyrick, 1934
- Aeolanthes cianolitha Meyrick, 1938
- Aeolanthes cladophora Meyrick, 1938
- Aeolanthes clinacta Meyrick, 1925
- Aeolanthes conductella (Walker, 1863)
- Aeolanthes coronifera Meyrick, 1938
- Aeolanthes cyclantha Meyrick, 1923
- Aeolanthes deltogramma Meyrick, 1923
- Aeolanthes diacritica Meyrick, 1918
- Aeolanthes dicraea Meyrick, 1908
- Aeolanthes erebomicta Meyrick, 1931
- Aeolanthes erythrantis Meyrick, 1935
- Aeolanthes euryatma Meyrick, 1908
- Aeolanthes haematopa Meyrick, 1931
- Aeolanthes lychnidias Meyrick, 1908
- Aeolanthes megalophthalma Meyrick, 1930
- Aeolanthes meniscias Meyrick, 1918
- Aeolanthes oculigera Diakonoff, 1952
- Aeolanthes rhodochrysa Meyrick, 1907
- Aeolanthes sagulata Meyrick, 1917
- Aeolanthes semicarnea Diakonoff, 1952
- Aeolanthes semiostrina Meyrick, 1935
- Aeolanthes sericanassa Meyrick, 1934
- Aeolanthes siphonias Meyrick, 1908
