= Aeolanthes siphonias =

Scientific classification
- Kingdom: Animalia
- Phylum: Arthropoda
- Class: Insecta
- Order: Lepidoptera
- Family: Depressariidae
- Genus: Aeolanthes
- Species: A. siphonias

Binomial name
- Aeolanthes siphonias Meyrick, 1908

Species of moth

Aeolanthes siphonias is a moth in the family Depressariidae. It was described by Edward Meyrick in 1908. It is found in northern India.

The wingspan is 22–29 mm. The forewings are whitish with a fine oblique ferruginous line from one-third of the costa to the upper margin of the cell and there is a ferruginous line beneath the posterior half of the costa. The posterior margin of the cell and veins 3-9 are marked with fine ferruginous-brown lines and there is a ferruginous-brown patch along the dorsum from the base, terminating in a triangular spot before the tornus, of which the first half is dark ferruginous-brown edged anteriorly with whitish and posteriorly with black. The second half is dark fuscous and there is a fine blackish terminal line. The hindwings of the males are pale ochreous-yellowish, with the dorsal half suffused with pale greyish, in females the hindwings are light grey.
