= Aeolanthes coronifera =

Scientific classification
- Kingdom: Animalia
- Phylum: Arthropoda
- Class: Insecta
- Order: Lepidoptera
- Family: Depressariidae
- Genus: Aeolanthes
- Species: A. coronifera

Binomial name
- Aeolanthes coronifera Meyrick, 1938

Species of moth

Aeolanthes coronifera is a moth in the family Depressariidae. It was described by Edward Meyrick in 1938. It is found in Yunnan, China.
