= Microcolona leucochtha =

Scientific classification
- Kingdom: Animalia
- Phylum: Arthropoda
- Class: Insecta
- Order: Lepidoptera
- Family: Elachistidae
- Genus: Microcolona
- Species: M. leucochtha

Binomial name
- Microcolona leucochtha Meyrick, 1897

Species of moth

Microcolona leucochtha is a moth in the family Elachistidae. It was described by Edward Meyrick in 1897. It is found in Australia, where it has been recorded from New South Wales and South Australia.

The wingspan is 8–9 mm. The forewings are whitish, sprinkled with dark fuscous with a broad clear white longitudinal suffusion extending from the base to three-fourths, anteriorly nearly or quite reaching the costa, posteriorly discal and suffusedly edged above with yellow ochreous. There is sometimes a black basal median dot. The stigmata is raised and black. The hindwings are light grey.
