= Aeolanthes diacritica =

Scientific classification
- Kingdom: Animalia
- Phylum: Arthropoda
- Class: Insecta
- Order: Lepidoptera
- Family: Depressariidae
- Genus: Aeolanthes
- Species: A. diacritica

Binomial name
- Aeolanthes diacritica Meyrick, 1918

Species of moth

Aeolanthes diacritica is a moth of the family Depressariidae. It is found in India (Assam).

The wingspan is about 19 mm. The forewings are shining white, the costa tinged ochreous anteriorly and with an irregular ferruginous-orange basal spot reaching the costa but not the dorsum, sending a short streak along the fold. The dorsal area up to the cell is suffused brown, the dorsal edge towards the base whitish, otherwise dark fuscous terminating posteriorly in a blotch of dark fuscous suffusion limited by vein two. The lower and posterior margins of the cell are dark brown, with veins 2–6 marked by dark brown lines and 7–9 by fine orange lines. A ferruginous-orange streak is found along the costa from the middle, posteriorly slightly diverging and sprinkled dark fuscous, not reaching the apex and there is a dark fuscous terminal line. The hindwings are pale grey.
