= Microcolona trigonospila =

Scientific classification
- Kingdom: Animalia
- Phylum: Arthropoda
- Class: Insecta
- Order: Lepidoptera
- Family: Elachistidae
- Genus: Microcolona
- Species: M. trigonospila

Binomial name
- Microcolona trigonospila Meyrick, 1897

Species of moth

Microcolona trigonospila is a moth in the family Elachistidae. It was described by Edward Meyrick in 1897. It is found in Australia, where it has been recorded from New South Wales and Victoria.

The wingspan is 8–10 mm. The forewings are light reddish ochreous, the margins suffusedly irrorated (sprinkled) with dark fuscous. The stigmata is raised, black and edged with whitish ochreous. The first discal is somewhat before the middle, the second at three-fourths and the plical obliquely before the first discal. The hindwings are fuscous.
