= Microcolona arizela =

Scientific classification
- Kingdom: Animalia
- Phylum: Arthropoda
- Class: Insecta
- Order: Lepidoptera
- Family: Elachistidae
- Genus: Microcolona
- Species: M. arizela

Binomial name
- Microcolona arizela Meyrick, 1897

Species of moth

Microcolona arizela is a moth in the family Elachistidae. It was described by Edward Meyrick in 1897. It is found in Australia, where it has been recorded from New South Wales and Tasmania.

The wingspan is 11–13 mm. The forewings are white with a small black plical tuft and a small blackish dorsal spot near the base. The costal edge is sometimes irrorated (sprinkled) with blackish. The stigmata is rather large, raised and black. There is a ferruginous-ochreous fascia from the costa, traversing the first discal stigma and terminating in a broader blackish dorsal suffusion. There is also a very oblique ferruginous-ochreous fascia from beyond the middle of the costa to the termen below the apex. The termen and posterior half of the costa are variably suffused with coarse black irroration. The hindwings are dark fuscous.
