= Aeolanthes sagulata =

Scientific classification
- Kingdom: Animalia
- Phylum: Arthropoda
- Class: Insecta
- Order: Lepidoptera
- Family: Depressariidae
- Genus: Aeolanthes
- Species: A. sagulata

Binomial name
- Aeolanthes sagulata Meyrick, 1917

Species of moth

Aeolanthes sagulata is a moth in the family Depressariidae. It was described by Edward Meyrick in 1917. It is found in India (Bengal).

The wingspan is about 19 mm. The forewings are deep orange mostly suffused with light crimson-rose and with a tuft near the base, and one on the fold before the middle of the wing. There is a yellower irregular blotch in the disc at two-fifths and a transverse-oval pale yellow blotch in the disc at two-thirds, containing an orange-yellow spot. The apical and upper part of the terminal area are marbled with pale yellowish and there are some dark ferruginous scales on the veins in the disc towards the termen. The hindwings are light orange.
