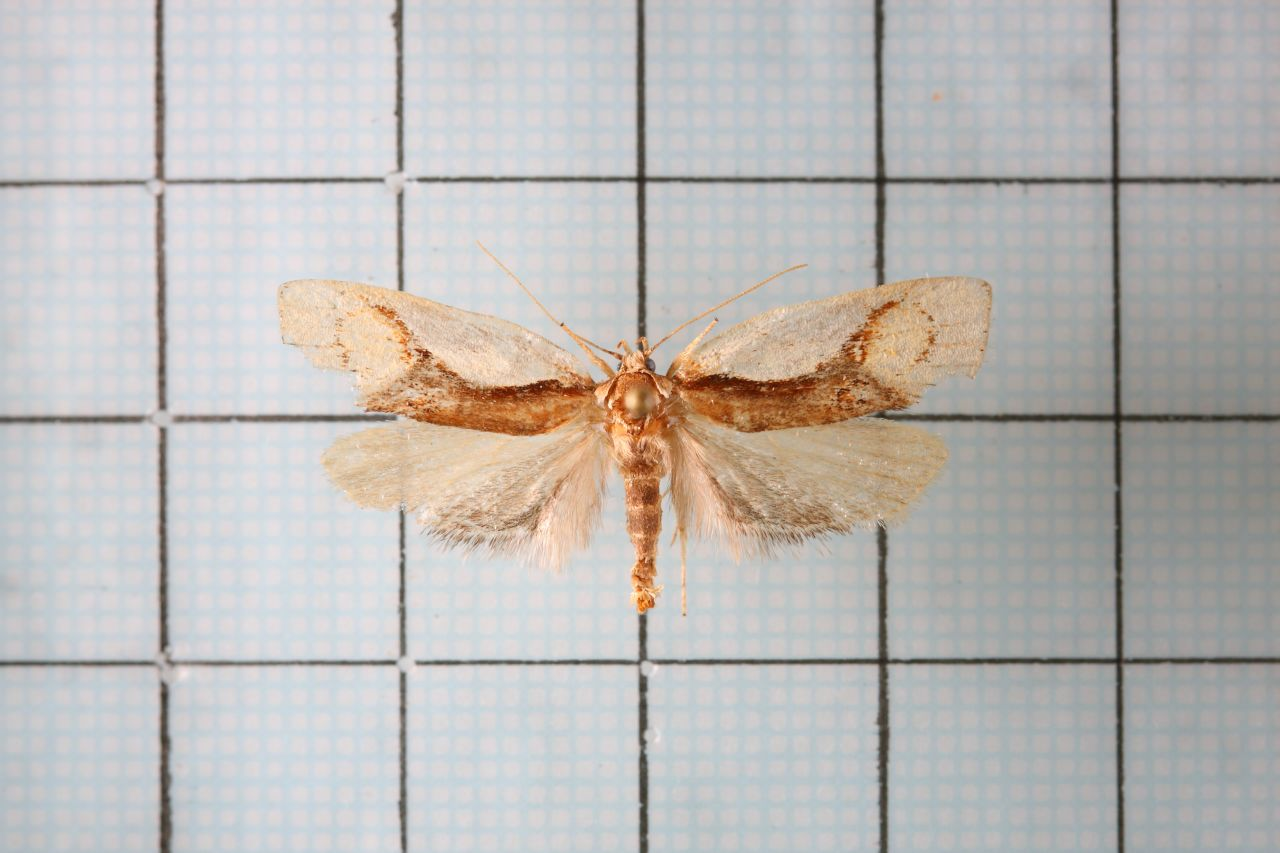

Scientific classification
- Kingdom: Animalia
- Phylum: Arthropoda
- Class: Insecta
- Order: Lepidoptera
- Family: Depressariidae
- Genus: Aeolanthes
- Species: A. brochias

Binomial name
- Aeolanthes brochias Meyrick, 1938

= Aeolanthes brochias =

Species of moth

Aeolanthes brochias is a moth of the family Depressariidae. It is found in China (Yunnan) and Taiwan.
