= Aeolanthes ceratopis =

Scientific classification
- Kingdom: Animalia
- Phylum: Arthropoda
- Class: Insecta
- Order: Lepidoptera
- Family: Depressariidae
- Genus: Aeolanthes
- Species: A. ceratopis

Binomial name
- Aeolanthes ceratopis Meyrick, 1934

Species of moth

Aeolanthes ceratopis is a moth in the family Depressariidae. It was described by Edward Meyrick in 1934. It is found in China.
