= Eretmograptis coniodoxa =

Scientific classification
- Kingdom: Animalia
- Phylum: Arthropoda
- Clade: Pancrustacea
- Class: Insecta
- Order: Lepidoptera
- Family: Elachistidae
- Subfamily: Elachistinae
- Genus: Eretmograptis; Meyrick, 1938
- Species: E. coniodoxa

Binomial name
- Eretmograptis coniodoxa Meyrick, 1938

Species of moth

Eretmograptis coniodoxa is a moth in the family Elachistidae, and the only species in the genus Eretmograptis. It was described by Edward Meyrick in 1938. It is found in the Democratic Republic of Congo (North Kivu).
