= Luquetia orientella =

Scientific classification
- Domain: Eukaryota
- Kingdom: Animalia
- Phylum: Arthropoda
- Class: Insecta
- Order: Lepidoptera
- Family: Depressariidae
- Genus: Luquetia
- Species: L. orientella

Binomial name
- Luquetia orientella (Rebel, 1893)

Synonyms
- Epigraphia orientella Rebel, 1893; Semioscopis orientella; Luquetia abchasiella Lvovsky, 1995

Species of moth

Luquetia orientella is a moth of the family Depressariidae. It is found in Greece, North Macedonia, Albania and Russia.

The wingspan is 20–22 mm.
