= Aeolanthes haematopa =

Scientific classification
- Kingdom: Animalia
- Phylum: Arthropoda
- Class: Insecta
- Order: Lepidoptera
- Family: Depressariidae
- Genus: Aeolanthes
- Species: A. haematopa

Binomial name
- Aeolanthes haematopa Meyrick, 1931

Species of moth

Aeolanthes haematopa is a moth in the family Depressariidae. It was described by Edward Meyrick in 1931. It is found in China.
