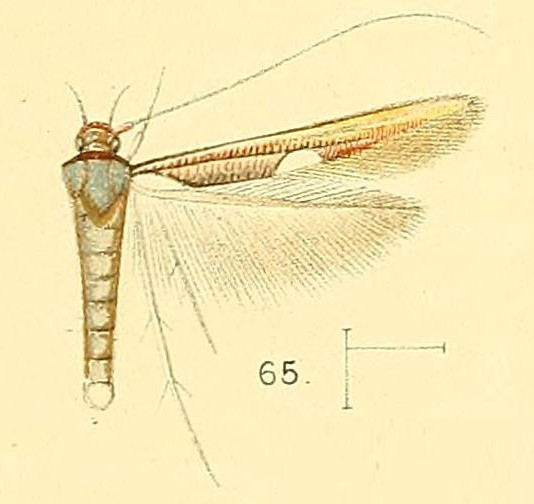
- Zaratha muricicoma

Scientific classification
- Kingdom: Animalia
- Phylum: Arthropoda
- Clade: Pancrustacea
- Class: Insecta
- Order: Lepidoptera
- Family: Elachistidae
- Subfamily: Agonoxeninae
- Genus: Zaratha; Walker, 1864

= Zaratha =

Genus of insects

Zaratha is a genus of moths of the subfamily Agonoxeninae.

== Taxonomy ==
The genus is placed in the family Elachistidae, Agonoxenidae or Blastodacnidae.

== Species ==
- Zaratha crotolitha Meyrick, 1915 (from Australia)
- Zaratha dicellias Meyrick, 1909 (from India)
- Zaratha macrocera (Felder & Rogenhofer, 1875) (from the Amazon basin)
- Zaratha mesonyctia Meyrick, 1909 (from Bolivia)
- Zaratha muricicoma Walsingham, 1891 (from Gambia)
- Zaratha plumbilinea (Diakonoff, 1955) (from New Guinea)
- Zaratha prosarista Meyrick, 1909 (from India)
- Zaratha pterodactylella Walker, 1864 (from Colombia and Brazil)
- Zaratha trisecta Meyrick, 1915 (from Australia)
