= Aeolanthes erebomicta =

Scientific classification
- Kingdom: Animalia
- Phylum: Arthropoda
- Class: Insecta
- Order: Lepidoptera
- Family: Depressariidae
- Genus: Aeolanthes
- Species: A. erebomicta

Binomial name
- Aeolanthes erebomicta Meyrick, 1931

Species of moth

Aeolanthes erebomicta is a moth in the family Depressariidae. It was described by Edward Meyrick in 1931. It is found in China.
