= Microcolona toropis =

Scientific classification
- Kingdom: Animalia
- Phylum: Arthropoda
- Class: Insecta
- Order: Lepidoptera
- Family: Elachistidae
- Genus: Microcolona
- Species: M. toropis

Binomial name
- Microcolona toropis Meyrick, 1897

Synonyms
- Elachista toropis Meyrick, 1897

Species of moth

Microcolona toropis is a moth of the family Elachistidae. It is found in Australia, where it has been recorded from Western Australia.

The wingspan is about 9 mm. The head and thorax are whitish, the antennae grey and the abdomen grey-whitish. The forewings are ochreous-whitish, slightly fuscous-sprinkled. The hindwings are light grey. Adults have been recorded in October.
