= Microcolona crypsicasis =

Scientific classification
- Kingdom: Animalia
- Phylum: Arthropoda
- Class: Insecta
- Order: Lepidoptera
- Family: Elachistidae
- Genus: Microcolona
- Species: M. crypsicasis

Binomial name
- Microcolona crypsicasis Meyrick, 1897

Species of moth

Microcolona crypsicasis is a moth in the family Elachistidae. It was described by Edward Meyrick in 1897. It is found in Australia, where it has been recorded from New South Wales and Tasmania.

The wingspan is 7–10 mm. The forewings are whitish ochreous, irrorated (sprinkled) with fuscous. There is a raised black dot on the fold at one-sixth and another beneath the fold at one-third. A third is found in the disc slightly above the middle and a fourth beneath the fold obliquely beyond the third, almost dorsal, and two transversely placed close together above the tornus. There is a cloudy fuscous spot on the costa before two-thirds and two black dots longitudinally placed at the apex. The hindwings are grey.
