= Microcolona thymopis =

Scientific classification
- Kingdom: Animalia
- Phylum: Arthropoda
- Class: Insecta
- Order: Lepidoptera
- Family: Elachistidae
- Genus: Microcolona
- Species: M. thymopis

Binomial name
- Microcolona thymopis Meyrick, 1897

Species of moth

Microcolona thymopis is a moth in the family Elachistidae. It was described by Edward Meyrick in 1897. It is found in Australia, where it has been recorded from New South Wales.

The wingspan is 6–7 mm. The forewings are light ochreous, irregularly mixed with darker ochreous and whitish, the margins suffusedly irrorated (sprinkled) with black. There is some black irroration on the fold towards the base and a blackish dorsal spot near the base. The stigmata is raised, black and partly white edged. The first discal before the middle, sometimes followed immediately by a small irregular dark fuscous patch. The second is small and the plical is found obliquely before the first discal. There is a patch of blackish suffusion on the costa at about two-thirds. The hindwings are grey.
