= Aeolanthes sericanassa =

Scientific classification
- Kingdom: Animalia
- Phylum: Arthropoda
- Class: Insecta
- Order: Lepidoptera
- Family: Depressariidae
- Genus: Aeolanthes
- Species: A. sericanassa

Binomial name
- Aeolanthes sericanassa Meyrick, 1934

Species of moth

Aeolanthes sericanassa is a moth in the family Depressariidae. It was described by Edward Meyrick in 1934. It is found in China.
