= Aeolanthes ampelurga =

Scientific classification
- Domain: Eukaryota
- Kingdom: Animalia
- Phylum: Arthropoda
- Class: Insecta
- Order: Lepidoptera
- Family: Depressariidae
- Genus: Aeolanthes
- Species: A. ampelurga

Binomial name
- Aeolanthes ampelurga Meyrick, 1925

Species of moth

Aeolanthes ampelurga is a moth in the family Depressariidae. It was described by Edward Meyrick in 1925. It is found in northern India (Kumaon).

The wingspan is about 24 mm. The forewings are pale ochreous-yellowish, irregularly tinged pale rosy with three or four small yellow-whitish spots and some irregular ferruginous marking on the basal area. There is an irregular rather curved transverse ferruginous line with some raised dark fuscous scales in the disc from the costa before one-third not reaching the dorsum, followed by two small yellow-whitish spots on the lower portion, and a yellow whitish ferruginous-edged oblique trapezoidal blotch from the costa, beyond this a yellow-whitish ferruginous-edged round spot in the disc and a broad triangular light purplish-rosy costal patch with the apex extended around the discal spot. There are two ferruginous waved-dentate lines towards the termen, the first marked with some dark fuscous scales in the disc, the second tending to enclose small yellow-whitish terminal spots, a pale rosy marginal line irrorated dark fuscous around the apex and termen. The hindwings are light grey.
