= Myrrhinitis =

Scientific classification
- Kingdom: Animalia
- Phylum: Arthropoda
- Class: Insecta
- Order: Lepidoptera
- Family: Elachistidae
- Genus: Myrrhinitis; Meyrick, 1913
- Species: M. sporeuta

Binomial name
- Myrrhinitis sporeuta Meyrick, 1913

Species of moth

Myrrhinitis sporeuta is a moth in the family Elachistidae, and the only species in the genus Myrrhinitis. It was described by Edward Meyrick in 1913. It is found in South Africa.
