= Zaratha crotolitha =

Scientific classification
- Kingdom: Animalia
- Phylum: Arthropoda
- Clade: Pancrustacea
- Class: Insecta
- Order: Lepidoptera
- Family: Elachistidae
- Genus: Zaratha
- Species: Z. crotolitha

Binomial name
- Zaratha crotolitha Meyrick, 1915

Species of moth

Zaratha crotolitha is a moth of the family Elachistidae. It is found in Australia.
