= Aeolanthes conductella =

Scientific classification
- Kingdom: Animalia
- Phylum: Arthropoda
- Class: Insecta
- Order: Lepidoptera
- Family: Depressariidae
- Genus: Aeolanthes
- Species: A. conductella

Binomial name
- Aeolanthes conductella (Walker, 1863)

Synonyms
- Psecadia conductella Walker, 1863

Species of moth

Aeolanthes conductella is a moth in the family Depressariidae. It was described by Francis Walker in 1863. It is found in Australia, where it has been recorded from Tasmania.

Adults are brown, with numerous hoary hairs, paler beneath. The forewings are slightly acute, with a few black points in the disk and the costa very slightly convex towards the base and the exterior border is extremely oblique. The hindwings are brownish cinereous.
