= Mylocrita =

Scientific classification
- Kingdom: Animalia
- Phylum: Arthropoda
- Class: Insecta
- Order: Lepidoptera
- Family: Elachistidae
- Genus: Mylocrita; Meyrick, 1916
- Species: M. acratopis

Binomial name
- Mylocrita acratopis Meyrick, 1922

Species of moth

Mylocrita acratopis is a moth in the family Elachistidae, and the only species in the genus Mylocrita. It was described by Edward Meyrick in 1922. It is found in Australia.
