= Zaratha trisecta =

Scientific classification
- Kingdom: Animalia
- Phylum: Arthropoda
- Class: Insecta
- Order: Lepidoptera
- Family: Elachistidae
- Genus: Zaratha
- Species: Z. trisecta

Binomial name
- Zaratha trisecta Meyrick, 1915

Species of moth

Zaratha trisecta is a moth of the family Elachistidae. It is found in Australia.
