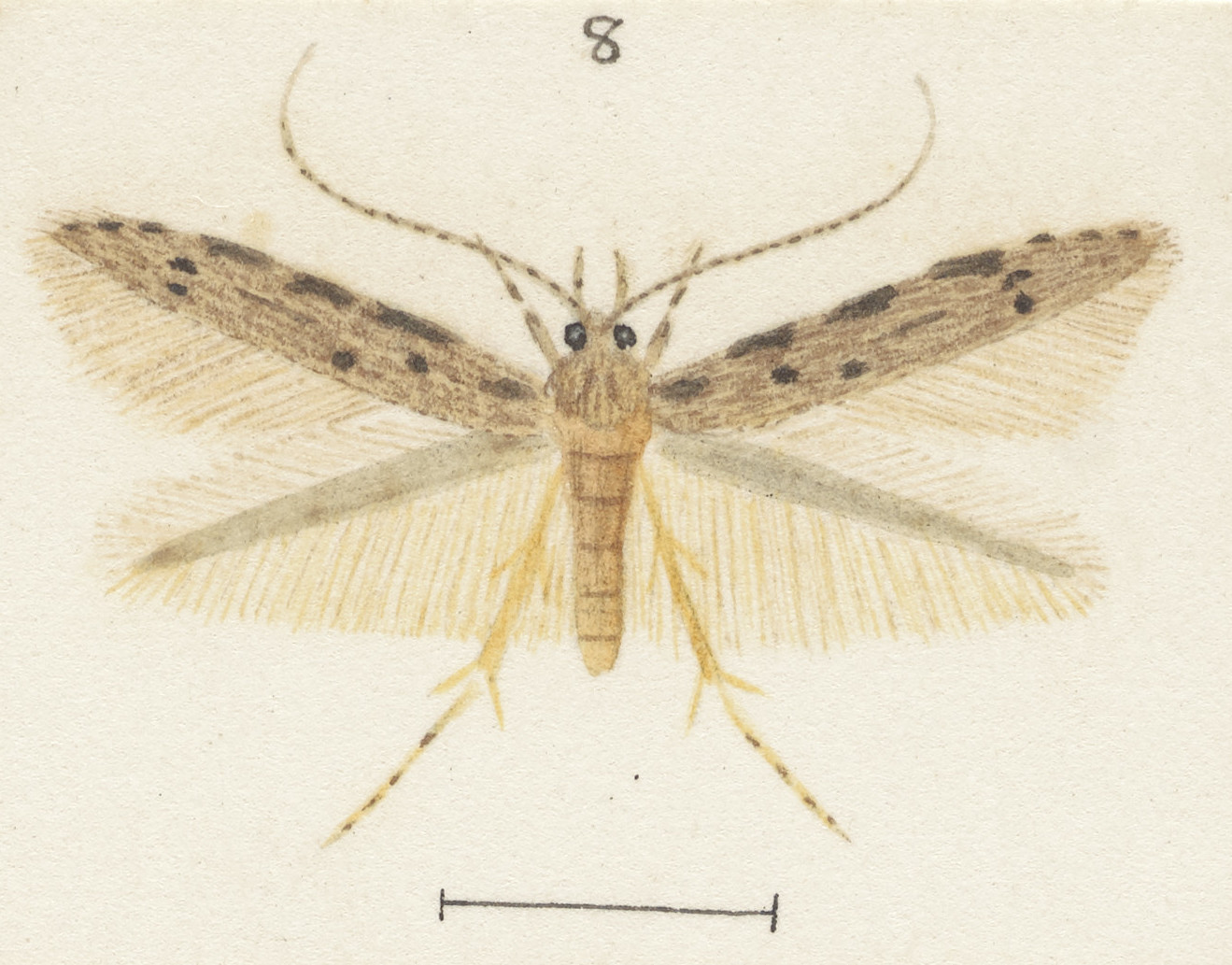

Scientific classification
- Domain: Eukaryota
- Kingdom: Animalia
- Phylum: Arthropoda
- Class: Insecta
- Order: Lepidoptera
- Family: Elachistidae
- Genus: Microcolona
- Species: M. characta

Binomial name
- Microcolona characta Meyrick, 1897

= Microcolona characta =

Species of moth

Microcolona characta is a moth in the family Elachistidae. It was described by Edward Meyrick in 1897. It is found in New Zealand and Australia, where it has been recorded from New South Wales.

The wingspan is 9–11 mm. The forewings are ochreous fuscous, more or less irrorated (sprinkled) irregularly with dark fuscous, sometimes mixed with whitish towards the dorsum anteriorly, and towards the termen and costa posteriorly. Sometimes, there is a blackish costal mark near the base. There is a tuft of ochreous and black scales beneath the fold and a raised black white-edged elongate dot in the disc somewhat before the middle, as well as a blackish raised dot beneath the fold somewhat beyond this. There is also an irregular black, sometimes whitish-edged, raised dot in the disc and a blackish spot on the costa before this, preceded by a pale spot. There are two or three irregularly placed undefined dark fuscous spots towards the apex. The hindwings are fuscous.
