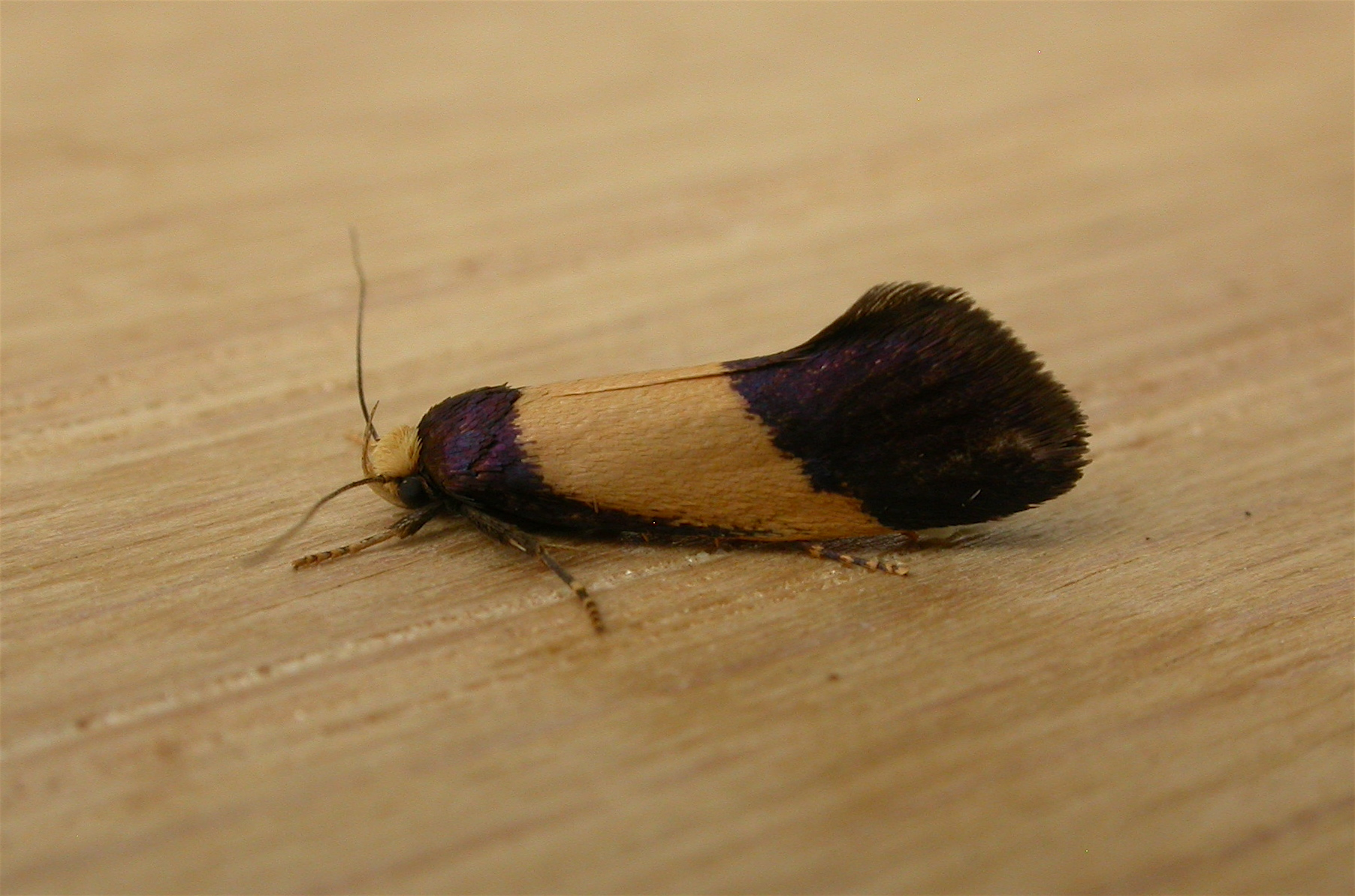
- Adult of unidentified Oecophorinae species, Aranda (Australia)

Scientific classification
- Kingdom: Animalia
- Phylum: Arthropoda
- Clade: Pancrustacea
- Class: Insecta
- Order: Lepidoptera
- Superfamily: Gelechioidea
- Family: Oecophoridae; Bruand, 1851

Diversity
- 7 subfamilies (but see text)

Synonyms
- Ashinagidae Matsumura, 1929

= Oecophoridae =

Concealer moths

Family of moths

Oecophoridae (concealer moths) is a family of small moths in the superfamily Gelechioidea. The phylogeny and systematics of gelechoid moths are still not fully resolved, and the circumscription of the Oecophoridae is strongly affected by this.

== Taxonomy and systematics ==
- Pleurotinae Toll, 1956
- Deuterogoniinae Spuler, 1910
- Unplaced
  - Colchia Lvovsky, 1995

Also possibly included is the Peruvian species Auxotricha ochrogypsa, described by Edward Meyrick in 1931 as the sole member of its genus. In the past, the family was circumscribed more widely and included the following subfamilies:

- Amphisbatinae (sometimes in Depressariinae)
- Autostichinae
- Depressariinae (including Cryptolechiinae)
- Hypertrophinae
- Metachandinae
- Oecophorinae (including Chimabachinae, Deuterogoniinae, Peleopodinae, Philobotinae)
- Stathmopodinae
- Stenomatinae

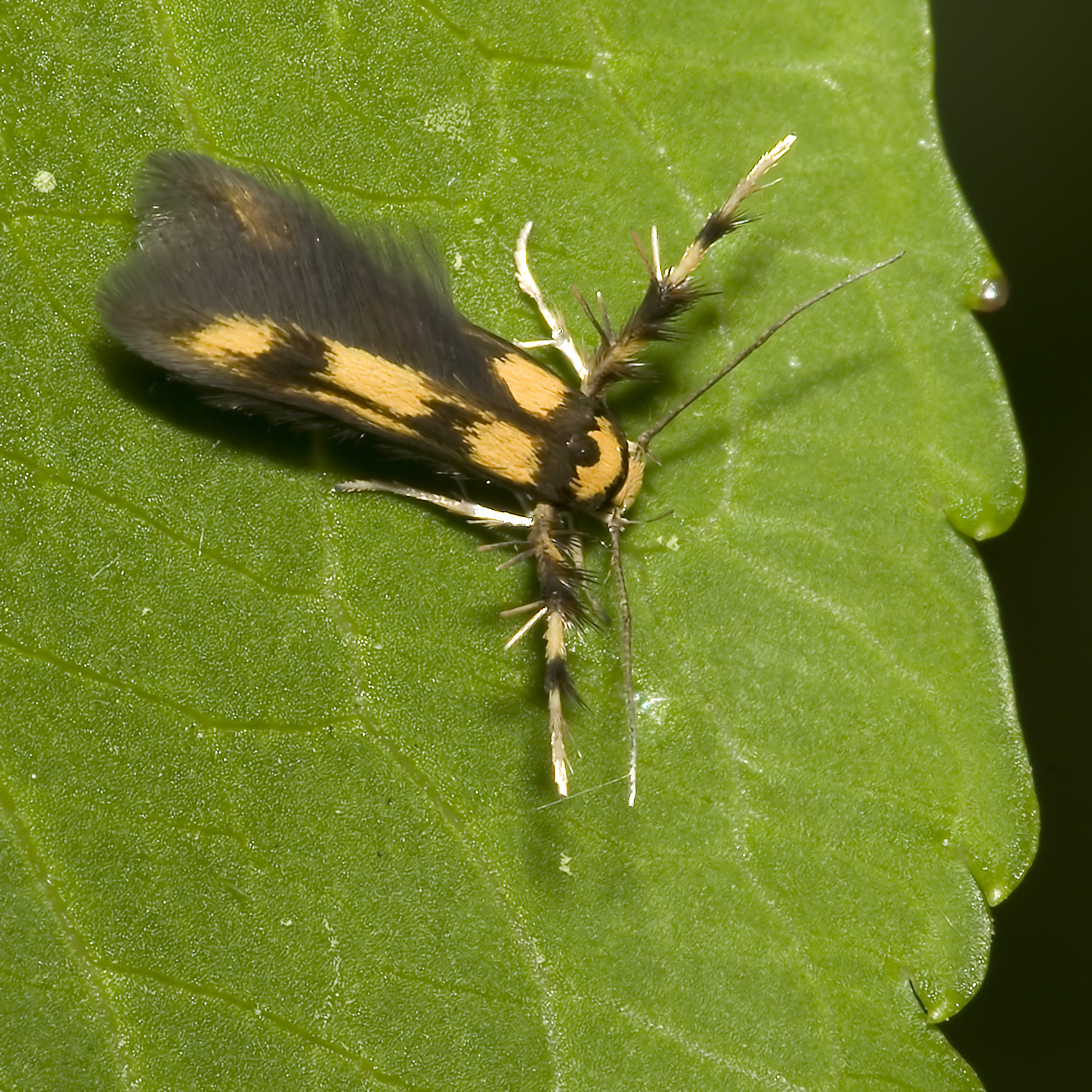
Stathmopoda pedella (Stathmopodinae) near Ilmenau (Thuringia, Germany)

Some treatments include only the Oecophorinae and Stathmopodinae here, placing the others elsewhere in the Gelechoidea (typically in the Elachistidae, but occasionally as independent families). But this approach might make Elachistidae highly paraphyletic. Other authors go as far as to expand the Oecophoridae beyond the delimitation used here, including also such groups as the Ethmiidae and Xyloryctidae. The latter may indeed be part of a monophyletic Oecophoridae, but more research is required; the Ethmiidae on the other hand are more likely a distinct family. The mysterious genus Aeolanthes is also sometimes included in the Oecophoridae (as a monotypic subfamily Aeolanthinae), but its actual relationships are quite obscure.

Some additional genera are also treated as Oecophoridae incertae sedis in recent studies:

- Amseloecia Povolný, 1983
- Callimodes Leraut, 1989 (Oecophorinae?)
  - subgenus Orienta Lvovsky, 1995
- Colchia Lvovsky, 1995
- Luquetia Leraut, 1991 (Depressariinae?)
- Minetia Leraut, 1991 (Oecophorinae?)
- Odonna Clarke, 1982
- Schiffermuellerina Leraut, 1989 (Oecophorinae?)
  - Schiffermuellerina grandis (Desvignes, 1842)
- Zizyphia Chrétien, 1908 (Oecophorinae? Formerly in Gelechiidae)
- †Epiborkhausenites Skalski, 1973 (Bartonian age, Baltic amber, Lithuania)

== Relationship with humans ==
Many concealer moths feed on dead plant material and are nutrient recyclers. On the other hand, the family includes the white-shouldered house moth (Endrosis sarcitrella), which is a widely distributed moth that has caterpillars that infest stored grain, and the brown house moth (Hofmannophila pseudospretella), which feeds on textiles and carpets as well as stored foodstuffs.

Concealer moths have also been put to useful service. Agonopterix ulicetella, a native of Europe, has been introduced to New Zealand and Hawaii in an attempt to control the European gorse (Ulex europaeus), and the defoliating hemlock moth (Agonopterix alstroemeriana) has been used against Conium maculatum poison hemlock in the United States.
