= Proterochyta =

Scientific classification
- Kingdom: Animalia
- Phylum: Arthropoda
- Class: Insecta
- Order: Lepidoptera
- Family: Scythrididae
- Genus: Proterochyta; Meyrick, 1918
- Species: P. epicoena

Binomial name
- Proterochyta epicoena (Meyrick, 1914)

Synonyms
- Elachista epicoena Meyrick, 1914; Scythris epicoena; Scythris calciflua Meyrick, 1921

Genus of moths

Proterochyta is a monotypic moth genus in the family Scythrididae. Its only species, Proterochyta epicoena is found in Mozambique, Namibia, Zimbabwe and Gauteng, South Africa. Both the genus and species were first described by Edward Meyrick in 1914.

The wingspan is about 13–14 mm. The forewings are whitish with some scattered light brownish scales in the disc and posteriorly. The hindwings are grey.
