= Microcolona nodata =

Scientific classification
- Kingdom: Animalia
- Phylum: Arthropoda
- Class: Insecta
- Order: Lepidoptera
- Family: Elachistidae
- Genus: Microcolona
- Species: M. nodata

Binomial name
- Microcolona nodata Meyrick, 1897

Species of moth

Microcolona nodata is a moth in the family Elachistidae. It was described by Edward Meyrick in 1897. It is found in Australia, where it has been recorded from New South Wales, Western Australia and Tasmania.

The wingspan is 7–8 mm. The forewings are ochreous, mixed with white and sprinkled with dark fuscous, almost wholly suffused with white on the anterior half and sometimes throughout. There is a raised black dot on the fold at one-sixth and a larger one beneath the fold at one-third, a third in the disc before the middle, as well as a fourth beneath the fold obliquely beyond the third. There are two transversely placed close together or confluent above the tornus. There is sometimes a blackish costal dot beyond the middle and always a black apical dot and another obliquely above and before it. The hindwings are whitish grey.
