= Deuterogoniinae =

Scientific classification
- Domain: Eukaryota
- Kingdom: Animalia
- Phylum: Arthropoda
- Class: Insecta
- Order: Lepidoptera
- Family: Oecophoridae
- Subfamily: Deuterogoniinae; Spuler, 1910

Subfamily of moths

Deuterogoniinae is a subfamily of moths in the family Oecophoridae.

== Taxonomy and systematics ==
- Deuterogonia Rebel in Staudinger & Rebel, 1901
