= Lamprozela =

Scientific classification
- Kingdom: Animalia
- Phylum: Arthropoda
- Class: Insecta
- Order: Lepidoptera
- Family: Heliozelidae
- Genus: Lamprozela; Meyrick, 1916

Synonyms
- Praefulgens Meyrick, 1916; Microplitica Meyrick, 1935; Microplitis Meyrick, 1922 (Preocc.)

Genus of moths

Lamprozela is a genus of moths from the Heliozelidae family. It was first described by Edward Meyrick, in 1916.

== Species ==
- Lamprozela desmophanes
- Lamprozela metadesmia
