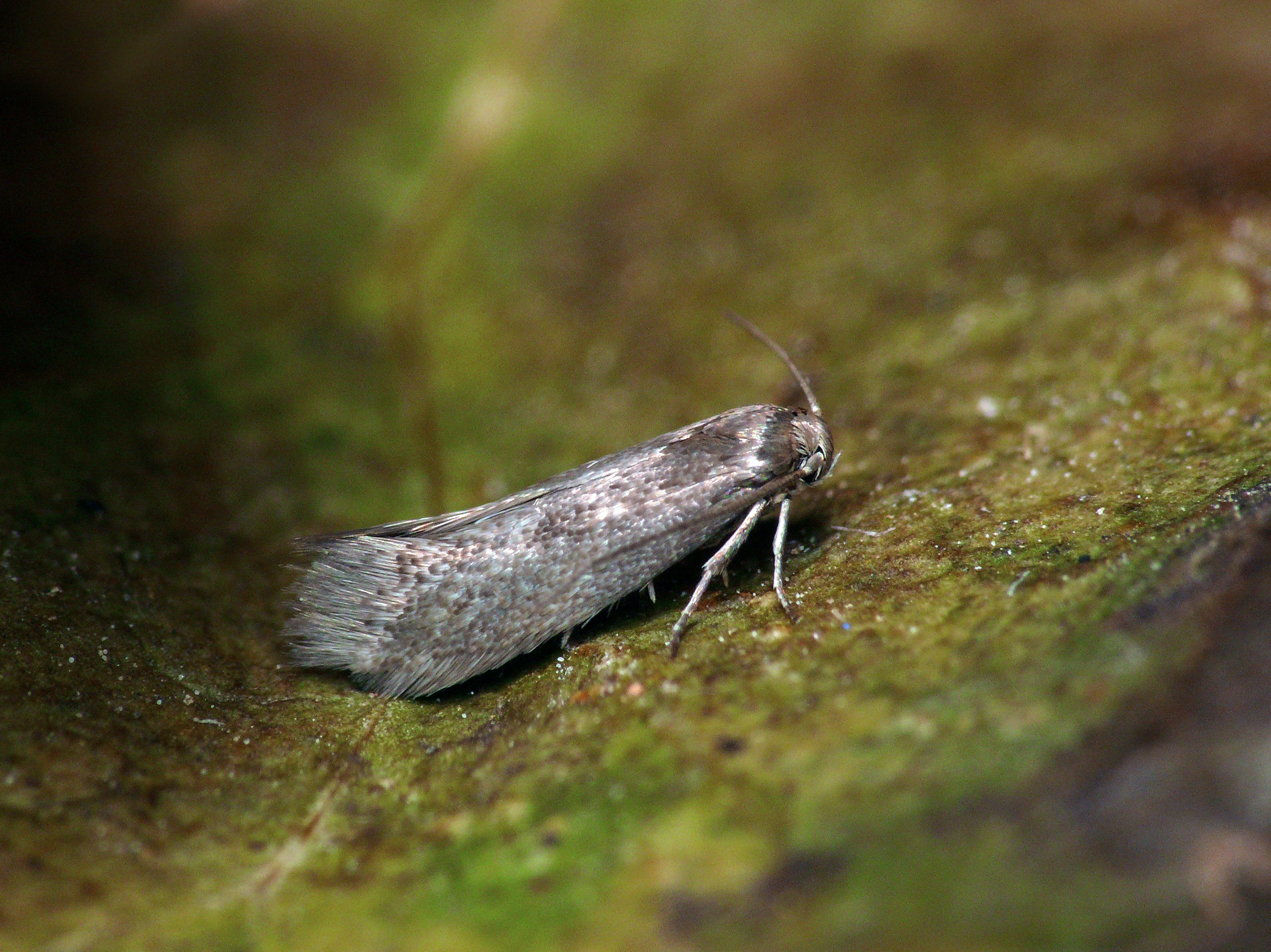
- Perittia obscurepunctella

Scientific classification
- Kingdom: Animalia
- Phylum: Arthropoda
- Class: Insecta
- Order: Lepidoptera
- Family: Elachistidae
- Subfamily: Elachistinae
- Genus: Perittia; Stainton, 1854

Synonyms
- List: Scirtopoda Wocke in Heineman, 1876; Mendesia de Joannis, 1902; Polymetis Walsingham, 1908; Triboloneura Walsingham, 1908; Phthinostoma Mayrick, 1914; Symphoristis Meyrick, 1918; Aristoptila Meyrick, 1932; Zemiocrita Meyrick, 1933; Onceroptila Braun, 1948; Swezeyula Zimmerman & Bradley, 1950; Perittoides Sinev, 1992; Habeleria Traugott-Olsen, 1995; Sineviana Traugott-Olsen, 1995; Pretoriana Traugott-Olsen, 1995 (unavailable name); Sruogania Traugott-Olsen, 1995; Bradleyana Traugott-Olsen, 1995; Whitebreadia Traugott-Olsen, 1995; Annettenia Traugott-Olsen, 1995; Kuznetsoviana Traugott-Olsen, 1995; Gautengia Kemal & Koçak, 2006

= Perittia =

Genus of moths

Perittia is a genus of moths of the family Elachistidae. It occurs in Eurasia, North and South Africa, Hawaii, and the Americas.

== Species ==
- Perittia aganopa (Meyrick, 1911)
- Perittia andoi Inoue et al., 1982
- Perittia antauges Kaila, 2011
- Perittia biloba Sruoga, 1990
- Perittia carlinella (Walsingham, 1908)
- Perittia cinereipunctella Turati, 1930
- Perittia constantinella (Rebel, 1901)
- Perittia cygnodiella (Busck, 1921)
- Perittia daleris Kaila, 2011
- Perittia deroga Kaila, 2011
- Perittia echiella (de Joannis, 1902)
- Perittia eremonoma (Braun, 1948)
- Perittia ernsti Kaila, 2000
- Perittia eselkopensis Mey, 2011
- Perittia farinella (Thunberg, 1794)
- Perittia fraudatrix Kaila, 2000
- Perittia granadensis (Traugott-Olsen, 1995)
- Perittia herrichiella (Herrich-Schäffer, 1855)
- Perittia huemeri (Traugott-Olsen, 1990)
- Perittia infumata (Meyrick, 1914) (previously in Phthinostoma)
- Perittia junnilaisella Kaila, 2009
- Perittia karadaghella Sinev & Budashkin, 1991
- Perittia lonicerae (Zimmerman and Bradley, 1950)
- Perittia mastodon Kaila, 2000
- Perittia metaxea (Kaila, 1995)
- Perittia minitaurella Kaila, 2009
- Perittia morgana Kaila, 2000
- Perittia mucronata (Parenti, 2001)
- Perittia nephele Kaila, 2000
- Perittia nimbifera (Meyrick, 1913)
- Perittia obscurepunctella (Stainton, 1848)
- Perittia ochrella (Sinev, 1992)
- Perittia pachyzona (Meyrick, 1921) (previously in Phthinostoma)
- Perittia passula Kaila, 1995
- Perittia patagonica Kaila, 2000
- Perittia petrosa Sruoga, 1992
- Perittia piperatella (Staudinger, 1859)
- Perittia punatensis Kaila, 2000
- Perittia ramona Kaila, 2000
- Perittia ravida Kaila, 2009
- Perittia regina Kaila, 2000
- Perittia secutrix Meyrick, 1914
- Perittia sepulchrella (Stainton, 1872)
- Perittia serica (Kaila, 1995)
- Perittia sibirica Sinev, 1992
- Perittia smaragdophanes (Meyrick, 1932)
- Perittia spermatopis (Meyrick, 1933)
- Perittia tectusella Sruoga, 1997
- Perittia tucumana Kaila, 2000
- Perittia unicolorella Sinev, 1992
- Perittia unifasciella Sinev, 1992
- Perittia weberella Whitebread, 1984

== Former species ==
- Perittia falciferella Sruoga & J. de Prins, 2009
- Perittia gnoma Sruoga & J. de Prins, 2009
- Perittia olelella Westwood in Wood, 1854
- Perittia podonosmella (Amsel, 1953)
- Perittia spatulata Sruoga & J. de Prins, 2009
- Perittia tantilla Sruoga & J. de Prins, 2009
