= Elachista occidentella =

Scientific classification
- Kingdom: Animalia
- Phylum: Arthropoda
- Class: Insecta
- Order: Lepidoptera
- Family: Elachistidae
- Genus: Elachista
- Species: E. occidentella

Binomial name
- Elachista occidentella Traugott-Olsen, 1992

Synonyms
- E. hispanica (Traugott-Olsen, 1992); E. vivesi (Traugott-Olsen, 1992); E. cuencaensis (Traugott-Olsen, 1992); E. vanderwolfi (Traugott-Olsen, 1992); E. amparoae (Traugott-Olsen, 1992); E. varensis (Traugott-Olsen, 1992); E. luqueti (Traugott-Olsen, 1992); E. occidentella (Traugott-Olsen, 1992); E. clintoni (Traugott-Olsen, 1992)

Species of moth

Elachista occidentella is a moth of the family Elachistidae that is endemic to Portugal.
