= Elachista vanderwolfi =

Scientific classification
- Kingdom: Animalia
- Phylum: Arthropoda
- Class: Insecta
- Order: Lepidoptera
- Family: Elachistidae
- Genus: Elachista
- Species: E. vanderwolfi

Binomial name
- Elachista vanderwolfi Traugott-Olsen, 1992

Synonyms
- Biselachista vanderwolfi (Traugott-Olsen & Nielsen, 1977); Cosmiotes vanderwolfi (Clemens, 1860); Elachista hispanica (Traugott-Olsen, 1992); Elachista vivesi (Traugott-Olsen, 1992); Elachista cuencaensis (Traugott-Olsen, 1992); Elachista vanderwolfi (Traugott-Olsen, 1992); Elachista amparoae (Traugott-Olsen, 1992); Elachista varensis (Traugott-Olsen, 1992); Elachista luqueti (Traugott-Olsen, 1992); Elachista occidentella (Traugott-Olsen, 1992); Elachista clintoni (Traugott-Olsen, 1992)

Species of moth

Elachista vanderwolfi is a moth of the family Elachistidae that is found in Spain, France and Austria.
