= Elachista veletaella =

Scientific classification
- Kingdom: Animalia
- Phylum: Arthropoda
- Class: Insecta
- Order: Lepidoptera
- Family: Elachistidae
- Genus: Elachista
- Species: E. veletaella

Binomial name
- Elachista veletaella Traugott-Olsen, 1992

Synonyms
- Biselachista veletaella (Traugott-Olsen & Nielsen, 1977); Cosmiotes veletaella (Clemens, 1860); Elachista tribertiella (Traugott-Olsen, 1985); Elachista toveella (Traugott-Olsen, 1985); Elachista baldizzonella (Traugott-Olsen, 1985); Elachista veletaella (Traugott-Olsen, 1992); Elachista bazaella (Traugott-Olsen, 1992); Elachista louiseae (Traugott-Olsen, 1992)

Species of moth

Elachista veletaella is a moth of the family Elachistidae that is endemic to Spain.
