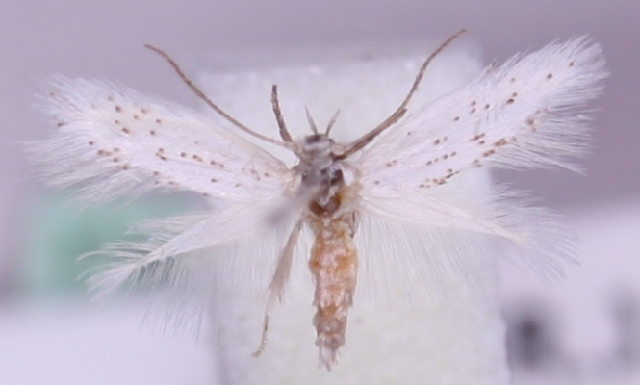

Scientific classification
- Kingdom: Animalia
- Phylum: Arthropoda
- Class: Insecta
- Order: Lepidoptera
- Family: Elachistidae
- Genus: Elachista
- Species: E. cahorsensis

Binomial name
- Elachista cahorsensis Traugott-Olsen, 1992

Synonyms
- E. dispunctella (Duponchel, 1843); E. cahorsensis (Traugott-Olsen, 1992); E. imbi (Traugott-Olsen, 1992); E. karsholti (Traugott-Olsen, 1992); E. mannella (Traugott-Olsen, 1992); E. multipunctella (Traugott-Olsen, 1992); E. pocopunctella (Traugott-Olsen, 1992); E. povolnyi (Traugott-Olsen, 1992); E. punctella (Traugott-Olsen, 1992); E. hallini (Traugott-Olsen, 1992); E. intrigella (Traugott-Olsen, 1992); E. nielspederi (Traugott-Olsen, 1992); E. skulei (Traugott-Olsen, 1992)

= Elachista cahorsensis =

Species of moth

Elachista cahorsensis is a moth of the family Elachistidae. It is found from Great Britain, Ireland and Germany to the Pyrenees.

The wingspan is about 8 millimetres (0.31 in).

The larvae feed on red fescue (Festuca rubra) mining the leaves. Larvae can be found in July and again from September to November. They are pale grey with a semi-transparent, reddish brown head.
