= Elachista totanaensis =

Scientific classification
- Kingdom: Animalia
- Phylum: Arthropoda
- Class: Insecta
- Order: Lepidoptera
- Family: Elachistidae
- Genus: Elachista
- Species: E. totanaensis

Binomial name
- Elachista totanaensis Traugott-Olsen, 1992

Synonyms
- E. glaseri (Traugott-Olsen, 1992); E. rikkeae (Traugott-Olsen, 1992); E. totanaensis (Traugott-Olsen, 1992); E. olemartini (Traugott-Olsen, 1992); E. bengtssoni (Traugott-Olsen, 1992); E. senecai (Traugott-Olsen, 1992); E. wadielhiraensis (Traugott-Olsen, 1992); E. rissaniensis (Traugott-Olsen, 1992); E. michelseni (Traugott-Olsen, 1992)

Species of moth

Elachista totanaensis is a moth of the family Elachistidae that is endemic to Spain.
