= Elachista gerdmaritella =

Scientific classification
- Kingdom: Animalia
- Phylum: Arthropoda
- Class: Insecta
- Order: Lepidoptera
- Family: Elachistidae
- Genus: Elachista
- Species: E. gerdmaritella

Binomial name
- Elachista gerdmaritella Traugott-Olsen, 1992

Synonyms
- E. maboulella (Chrétien, 1915); E. catalunella (Traugott-Olsen, 1992); E. gerdmaritella (Traugott-Olsen, 1992); E. gielisi (Traugott-Olsen, 1992)

Species of moth

Elachista gerdmaritella is a moth of the family Elachistidae that is endemic to Spain.
