= Elachista louiseae =

Scientific classification
- Kingdom: Animalia
- Phylum: Arthropoda
- Class: Insecta
- Order: Lepidoptera
- Family: Elachistidae
- Genus: Elachista
- Species: E. louiseae

Binomial name
- Elachista louiseae Traugott-Olsen, 1992

Synonyms
- E. tribertiella (Traugott-Olsen, 1985); E. toveella (Traugott-Olsen, 1985); E. baldizzonella (Traugott-Olsen, 1985); E. veletaella (Traugott-Olsen, 1992); E. bazaella (Traugott-Olsen, 1992); E. louiseae (Traugott-Olsen, 1992)

Species of moth

Elachista louiseae is a moth of the family Elachistidae. It is found in Spain.
