= Elachista minusculella =

Scientific classification
- Kingdom: Animalia
- Phylum: Arthropoda
- Class: Insecta
- Order: Lepidoptera
- Family: Elachistidae
- Genus: Elachista
- Species: E. minusculella

Binomial name
- Elachista minusculella Traugott-Olsen, 1992

Synonyms
- E. parvula (Parenti, 1978); E. minusculella (Traugott-Olsen, 1992); E. blancella (Traugott-Olsen, 1992)

Species of moth

Elachista minusculella is a moth of the family Elachistidae. It is found in Turkey.
