= Elachista pocopunctella =

Scientific classification
- Kingdom: Animalia
- Phylum: Arthropoda
- Class: Insecta
- Order: Lepidoptera
- Family: Elachistidae
- Genus: Elachista
- Species: E. pocopunctella

Binomial name
- Elachista pocopunctella Traugott-Olsen, 1992

Synonyms
- E. dispunctella (Duponchel, 1843); E. cahorsensis (Traugott-Olsen, 1992); E. imbi (Traugott-Olsen, 1992); E. karsholti (Traugott-Olsen, 1992); E. mannella (Traugott-Olsen, 1992); E. multipunctella (Traugott-Olsen, 1992); E. pocopunctella (Traugott-Olsen, 1992); E. povolnyi (Traugott-Olsen, 1992); E. punctella (Traugott-Olsen, 1992); E. hallini (Traugott-Olsen, 1992); E. intrigella (Traugott-Olsen, 1992); E. nielspederi (Traugott-Olsen, 1992); E. skulei (Traugott-Olsen, 1992)

Species of moth

Elachista pocopunctella is a moth of the family Elachistidae. It is found in Austria.
