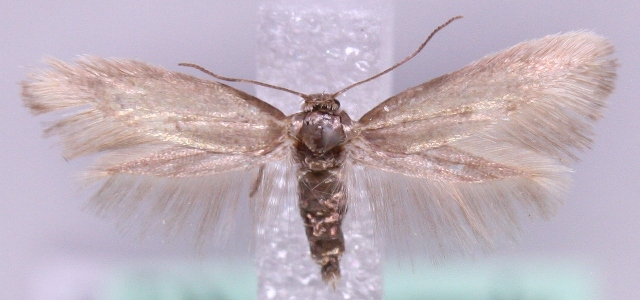

Scientific classification
- Kingdom: Animalia
- Phylum: Arthropoda
- Clade: Pancrustacea
- Class: Insecta
- Order: Lepidoptera
- Family: Elachistidae
- Genus: Perittia
- Species: P. obscurepunctella

Binomial name
- Perittia obscurepunctella (Stainton, 1848)

Synonyms
- Aphelosetia obscurepunctella Stainton, 1848; Aphelosetia olelella Wood, 1839

= Perittia obscurepunctella =

Species of moth

Perittia obscurepunctella is a moth of the family Elachistidae found in Europe.

== Description ==
The wingspan is 8–10 mm. The forewings are light shining grey, somewhat darker-sprinkled; plical stigma dark fuscous, elongate, followed by some whitish scales, second discal fuscous, indistinct. Hindwings are grey. The larva is greenish grey;dorsal line darker; head dark brown; plate of 2 blackish.

== Biology ==
Adults are on wing from April to June.

The larvae feed on honeysuckle (Lonicera periclymenum), Tatarian honeysuckle (Lonicera tatarica), fly honeysuckle (Lonicera xylosteum) and sometimes common snowberry (Symphoricarpos albus). They mine the leaves of their host plant. Larvae can be found from June to early August.

== Distribution ==
It is found from Sweden and Finland to the Pyrenees and Slovakia and from Ireland to the Baltic region and Poland.
