= Perittia granadensis =

Scientific classification
- Kingdom: Animalia
- Phylum: Arthropoda
- Clade: Pancrustacea
- Class: Insecta
- Order: Lepidoptera
- Family: Elachistidae
- Genus: Perittia
- Species: P. granadensis

Binomial name
- Perittia granadensis (Traugott-Olsen, 1995)

Synonyms
- Whitebreadia granadensis Traugott-Olsen, 1995

Species of moth

Perittia granadensis is a moth of the family Elachistidae. It is found in Spain.
