= Elachista nedaella =

Scientific classification
- Kingdom: Animalia
- Phylum: Arthropoda
- Class: Insecta
- Order: Lepidoptera
- Family: Elachistidae
- Genus: Elachista
- Species: E. nedaella

Binomial name
- Elachista nedaella Traugott-Olsen, 1985

Species of moth

Elachista nedaella is a moth of the family Elachistidae. It is found on Crete.
