= U. maculata =

U. maculata may refer to:

- Uapou maculata, a linyphiid spider
- Urodeta maculata, a Namibian moth
- Uropeltis maculata, a shield tail snake
- Usnea maculata, an old man's beard
