= Elachista lambeseella =

Scientific classification
- Kingdom: Animalia
- Phylum: Arthropoda
- Class: Insecta
- Order: Lepidoptera
- Family: Elachistidae
- Genus: Elachista
- Species: E. lambeseella

Binomial name
- Elachista lambeseella Nielsen & Traugott-Olsen, 1987

Species of moth

Elachista lambeseella is a moth in the family Elachistidae. It was described by Nielsen and Traugott-Olsen in 1987. It is found in Algeria.
