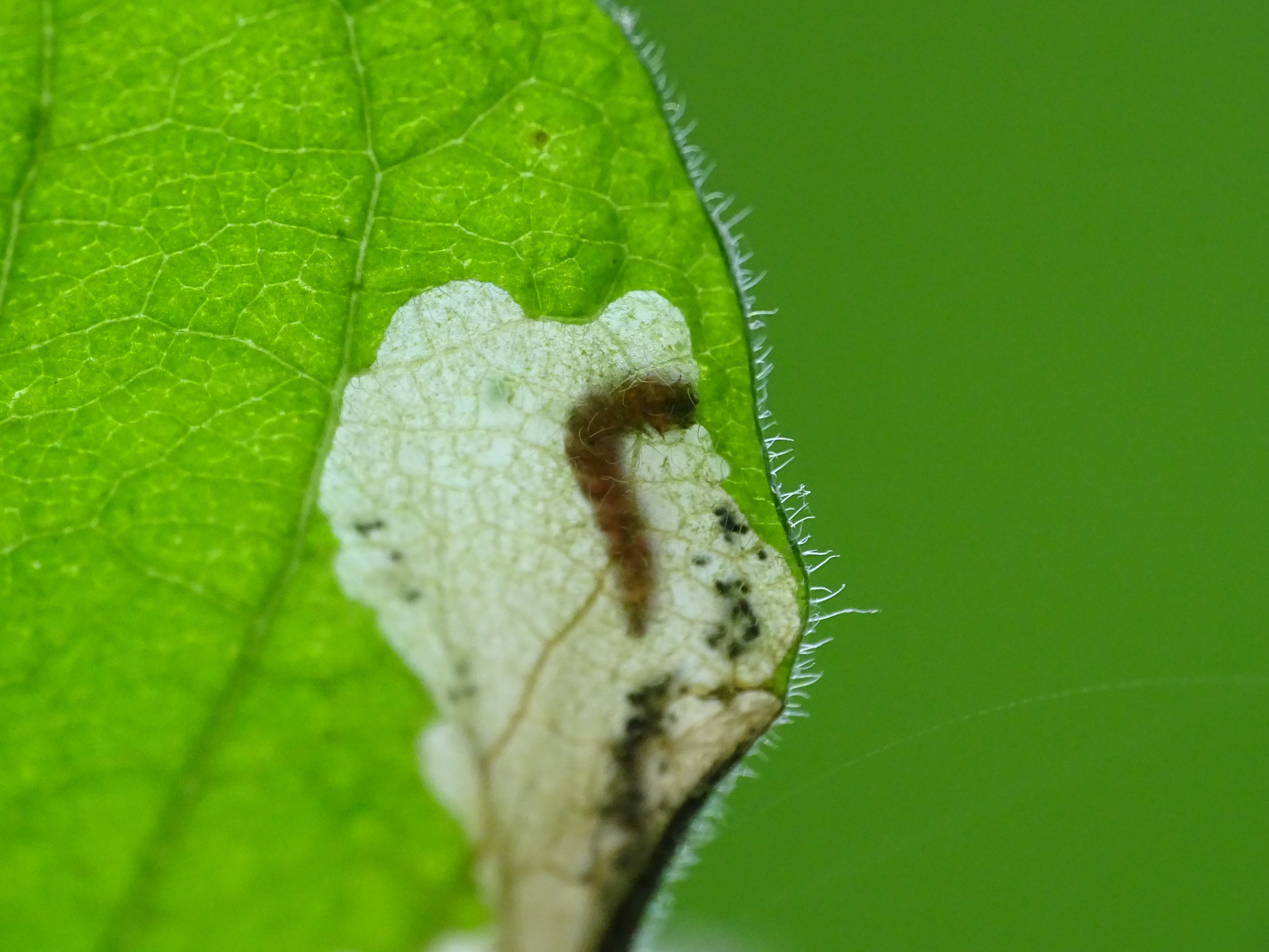
- Larva of Perittia herrichiella mining the leaf of Lonicera xylosteum

Scientific classification
- Kingdom: Animalia
- Phylum: Arthropoda
- Clade: Pancrustacea
- Class: Insecta
- Order: Lepidoptera
- Family: Elachistidae
- Genus: Perittia
- Species: P. herrichiella

Binomial name
- Perittia herrichiella (Herrich-Schaffer, 1855)

Synonyms
- Tinagma herrichiella Herrich-Schaffer, 1855; Dyselachista herrichiella; Scirtopoda herrichiella

= Perittia herrichiella =

Species of moth

Perittia herrichiella is a moth of the family Elachistidae. It is found from Sweden and Finland to the Pyrenees and Italy and from France to the Baltic region and Romania. It has also been recorded from Russia and North America, including New York, Ontario, Indiana and Michigan. The expected range of the species is south-eastern Canada and the north-central and north-eastern parts of the United States.

The wingspan is 8–9 mm. Adults are on wing from May to August.

The larvae feed on Lonicera alpigena, Lonicera periclymenum, Lonicera tatarica, Lonicera xylosteum and Symphoricarpos albus. They mine the leaves of their host plant. Larvae can be found from June to mid August or October depending on the location.
