= Perittia weberella =

Scientific classification
- Kingdom: Animalia
- Phylum: Arthropoda
- Clade: Pancrustacea
- Class: Insecta
- Order: Lepidoptera
- Family: Elachistidae
- Genus: Perittia
- Species: P. weberella

Binomial name
- Perittia weberella Whitebread, 1984

Species of moth

Perittia weberella is a moth of the family Elachistidae. It is found in Switzerland.

There are probably two generations per year.

The larvae feed on Lonicera xylosteum. They mine the leaves of their host plant. Larvae can be found from June and July.
