= Elachista kosteri =

Scientific classification
- Kingdom: Animalia
- Phylum: Arthropoda
- Class: Insecta
- Order: Lepidoptera
- Family: Elachistidae
- Genus: Elachista
- Species: E. kosteri

Binomial name
- Elachista kosteri Traugott-Olsen, 1995

Species of moth

Elachista kosteri is a moth of the family Elachistidae which is endemic to Greece.

The species is nocturnal.
