= Perittia lonicerae =

Scientific classification
- Kingdom: Animalia
- Phylum: Arthropoda
- Class: Insecta
- Order: Lepidoptera
- Family: Elachistidae
- Genus: Perittia
- Species: P. lonicerae

Binomial name
- Perittia lonicerae (Zimmerman and Bradley, 1950)

Synonyms
- Swezeyula lonicerae Zimmerman and Bradley, 1950; Perittia kurokoi Traugott-Olsen, 1995

Species of moth

Perittia lonicerae, the honeysuckle leaf miner, is a moth of the family Elachistidae. It was first discovered in Hawaii in 1949. It was later found in Japan in 1982, although it was described as new. Several other species are known from the eastern Palearctic Region, so it is likely that P. lonicerae originated there instead of Hawaii where it was first found.

The larvae feed on Lonicera japonica. They mine the leaves of their host plant.
