= Perittia andoi =

Scientific classification
- Kingdom: Animalia
- Phylum: Arthropoda
- Class: Insecta
- Order: Lepidoptera
- Family: Elachistidae
- Genus: Perittia
- Species: P. andoi

Binomial name
- Perittia andoi Kuroko, 1982

Synonyms
- Whitebreadia sineverella Traugott-Olsen, 1995

Species of moth

Perittia andoi is a moth of the family Elachistidae. It is found in Japan and the Russian Far East.

The length of the forewings is 6–6.5 mm (0.24–0.26 in).
