= Elachista falirakiensis =

Scientific classification
- Kingdom: Animalia
- Phylum: Arthropoda
- Class: Insecta
- Order: Lepidoptera
- Family: Elachistidae
- Genus: Elachista
- Species: E. falirakiensis

Binomial name
- Elachista falirakiensis Traugott-Olsen, 2000

Species of moth

Elachista falirakiensis is a moth of the family Elachistidae. It is found in Greece (the Dodecanese Islands).
