= Elachista christenseni =

Scientific classification
- Kingdom: Animalia
- Phylum: Arthropoda
- Class: Insecta
- Order: Lepidoptera
- Family: Elachistidae
- Genus: Elachista
- Species: E. christenseni

Binomial name
- Elachista christenseni Traugott-Olsen, 2000

Species of moth

Elachista christenseni is a moth of the family Elachistidae. It is found in Greece.
