= Elachista gebzeensis =

Scientific classification
- Kingdom: Animalia
- Phylum: Arthropoda
- Class: Insecta
- Order: Lepidoptera
- Family: Elachistidae
- Genus: Elachista
- Species: E. gebzeensis

Binomial name
- Elachista gebzeensis Traugott-Olsen, 1990

Species of moth

Elachista gebzeensis is a moth in the family Elachistidae. It was described by Traugott-Olsen in 1990. It is found in Turkey.
