= Elachista deresyensis =

Scientific classification
- Kingdom: Animalia
- Phylum: Arthropoda
- Class: Insecta
- Order: Lepidoptera
- Family: Elachistidae
- Genus: Elachista
- Species: E. deresyensis

Binomial name
- Elachista deresyensis Traugott-Olsen, 1988

Species of moth

Elachista deresyensis is a moth of the family Elachistidae. It was described by Traugott-Olsen in 1988. It is found in Turkey.
