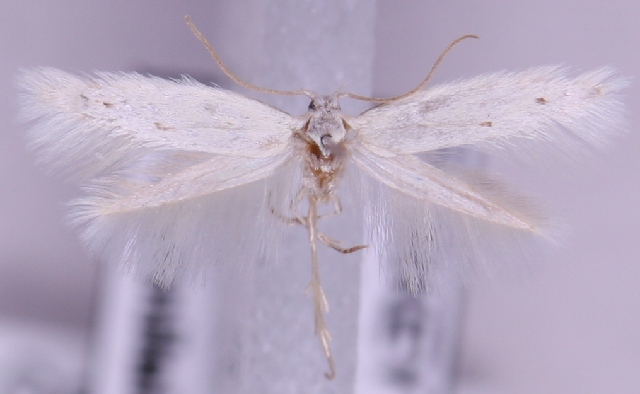

Scientific classification
- Kingdom: Animalia
- Phylum: Arthropoda
- Class: Insecta
- Order: Lepidoptera
- Family: Elachistidae
- Genus: Elachista
- Species: E. turkensis

Binomial name
- Elachista turkensis Traugott-Olsen, 1990

= Elachista turkensis =

Species of moth

Elachista turkensis is a moth in the family Elachistidae. It was described by Traugott-Olsen in 1990. It is found in Turkey.
