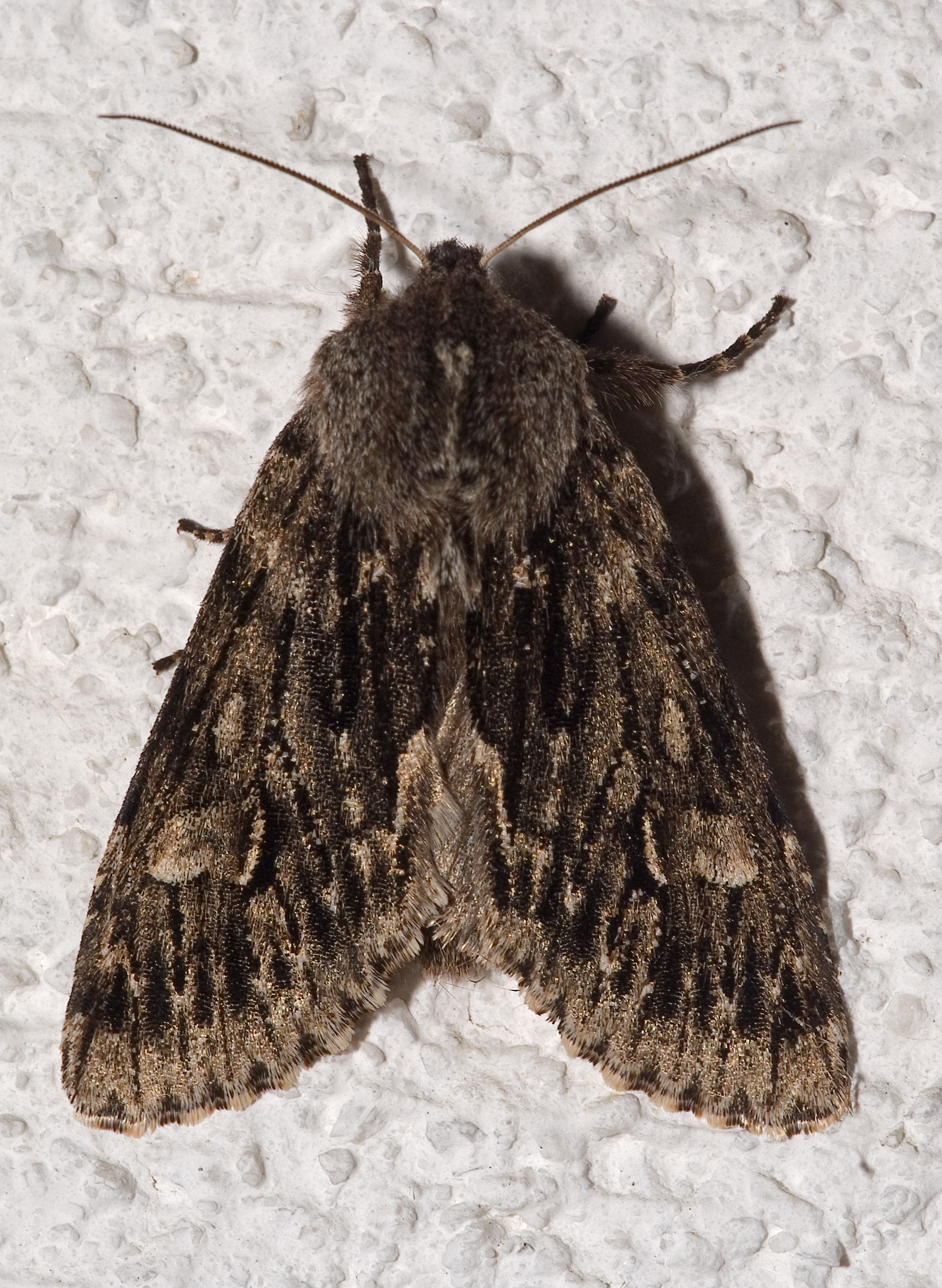

Scientific classification
- Domain: Eukaryota
- Kingdom: Animalia
- Phylum: Arthropoda
- Class: Insecta
- Order: Lepidoptera
- Superfamily: Noctuoidea
- Family: Noctuidae
- Genus: Brachionycha
- Species: B. nubeculosa

Binomial name
- Brachionycha nubeculosa (Esper, 1785)

= Brachionycha nubeculosa =

Species of moth

Brachionycha nubeculosa, the Rannoch sprawler, is a moth of the family Noctuoidea. It is found across the Palearctic from the British Isles in the west, across central and northern Europe over Russia, Siberia to China. The species is only locally distributed in central Europe, but is often relatively common in this region. In southern Europe, the occurrence is limited to some mountainous regions. In Germany, it reaches as far as the summit regions of the low mountain ranges. The species is moisture loving and prefers moist, cool temperate forests, mixed forests, wooded valleys, river and stream edges as well as orchards.

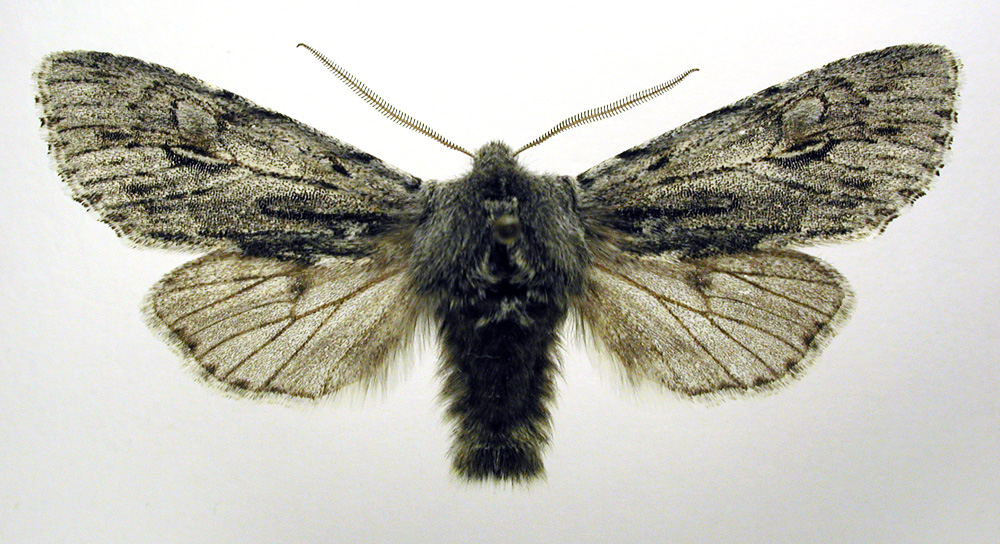
Mounted

The wingspan is 48–60 mm. Edward Meyrick describes it thus: Forewings pale brownish mixed with whitish and much sprinkled with black; veins marked with blackish; first, median, and second lines dark fuscous; reniform whitish, black edged, enclosing two dark marks; claviform, oval, black edged. Hindwings whitish fuscous, with dark fuscous discal spot and terminal dots. Larva pale yellow green deeper laterally; tubercular dots pale yellow; an oblique lateral streak on 4, and transverse streak on 12 yellow; legs more or less red. The larva habitually rests with the anterior segments strongly thrown back over the body and the legs outspread.

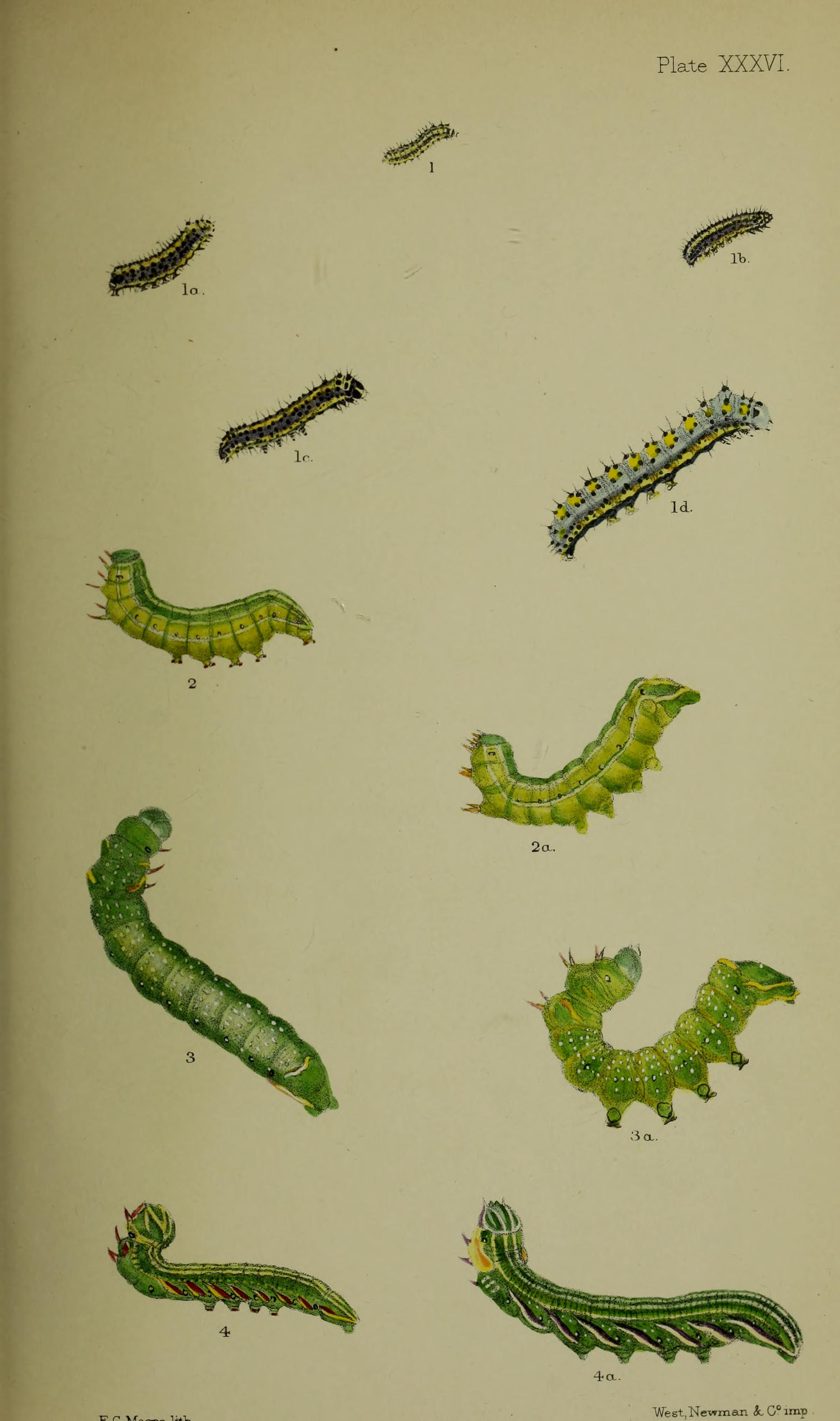
Figs.3, 3a larvae after final moult

The moth flies from March to April.^{a}

The larvae feed on birch, willow, Populus tremula, Prunus padus, Lonicera xylosteum, Tilia, Rhamnus frangula and Aster species.

== Notes ==
^{a} The flight season refers to Belgium and the Netherlands. This may vary in other parts of the range.
