= Elachista neapolisella =

Scientific classification
- Kingdom: Animalia
- Phylum: Arthropoda
- Class: Insecta
- Order: Lepidoptera
- Family: Elachistidae
- Genus: Elachista
- Species: E. neapolisella

Binomial name
- Elachista neapolisella Traugott-Olsen, 1985

Species of moth

Elachista neapolisella is a moth of the family Elachistidae. It is found on Crete.
