= Perittia cygnodiella =

Scientific classification
- Kingdom: Animalia
- Phylum: Arthropoda
- Clade: Pancrustacea
- Class: Insecta
- Order: Lepidoptera
- Family: Elachistidae
- Genus: Perittia
- Species: P. cygnodiella

Binomial name
- Perittia cygnodiella (Busck, 1921)

Synonyms
- Aphelosetia cygnodiella Busck, 1921; Onceroptila cygnodiella (Busck, 1921); Perittia clarkei Traugott-Olsen, 1995

Species of moth

Perittia cygnodiella is a moth of the family Elachistidae. It is found from Alberta and British Columbia through Washington to California.

The length of the forewings is 3.5–5.5 mm.
