= Perittia huemeri =

Scientific classification
- Kingdom: Animalia
- Phylum: Arthropoda
- Clade: Pancrustacea
- Class: Insecta
- Order: Lepidoptera
- Family: Elachistidae
- Genus: Perittia
- Species: P. huemeri

Binomial name
- Perittia huemeri (Traugott-Olsen, 1990)

Synonyms
- Mendesia huemeri Traugott-Olsen, 1990; Habeleria huemeri

Species of moth

Perittia huemeri is a moth of the family Elachistidae. It is found in Hungary, Croatia and Turkey.
