= Elachista anatoliensis =

Scientific classification
- Kingdom: Animalia
- Phylum: Arthropoda
- Clade: Pancrustacea
- Class: Insecta
- Order: Lepidoptera
- Family: Elachistidae
- Genus: Elachista
- Species: E. anatoliensis

Binomial name
- Elachista anatoliensis Traugott-Olsen, 1990

Synonyms
- Dibrachia anatoliensis (Traugott-Olsen, 1990)

Species of moth

Elachista anatoliensis is a moth of the family Elachistidae. It is found in Greece, Turkey, and Turkmenistan.

The length of the forewings is 4.4-4.9 mm.
