= Urodeta trilobata =

Scientific classification
- Kingdom: Animalia
- Phylum: Arthropoda
- Clade: Pancrustacea
- Class: Insecta
- Order: Lepidoptera
- Family: Elachistidae
- Genus: Urodeta
- Species: U. trilobata

Binomial name
- Urodeta trilobata J. de Prins & Sruoga, 2012

Species of moth

Urodeta trilobata is a moth of the family Elachistidae first described by Jurate De Prins and Virginijus Sruoga in 2012. It is found in South Africa, where it has been recorded from the Tswaing Crater Reserve in Gauteng.

The wingspan is 5.9–6 mm for males and about 5.8 mm for females.

== Etymology ==
The specific name refers to the shape of the valva and is derived from Latin tri- (meaning short three) and lobate (meaning having lobes).
