= Perittia passula =

Scientific classification
- Domain: Eukaryota
- Kingdom: Animalia
- Phylum: Arthropoda
- Class: Insecta
- Order: Lepidoptera
- Family: Elachistidae
- Genus: Perittia
- Species: P. passula

Binomial name
- Perittia passula Kaila, 1995

Species of moth

Perittia passula is a moth of the family Elachistidae. It is found in California, United States.

The length of the forewings is 3–4 mm (0.12–0.16 in).

The larvae feed on Lonicera hispidula. They mine the leaves of their host plant.
