= Perittia biloba =

Scientific classification
- Kingdom: Animalia
- Phylum: Arthropoda
- Clade: Pancrustacea
- Class: Insecta
- Order: Lepidoptera
- Family: Elachistidae
- Genus: Perittia
- Species: P. biloba

Binomial name
- Perittia biloba Sruoga, 1990

Synonyms
- Bradleyana biloba ( Sruoga, 1990)

Species of moth

Perittia biloba is a moth of the family Elachistidae. It is found in Tajikistan, Kazakhstan and Uzbekistan.

The length of the forewings is about 3 mm. Adults have been recorded in June.
