= Perittia petrosa =

Scientific classification
- Kingdom: Animalia
- Phylum: Arthropoda
- Clade: Pancrustacea
- Class: Insecta
- Order: Lepidoptera
- Family: Elachistidae
- Genus: Perittia
- Species: P. petrosa

Binomial name
- Perittia petrosa Sruoga, 1992

Synonyms
- Sruogania petrosa

Species of moth

Perittia petrosa is a moth in the family Elachistidae. It was described by Sruoga in 1992. It is found in Central Asia.
