= Urodeta faro =

Scientific classification
- Kingdom: Animalia
- Phylum: Arthropoda
- Clade: Pancrustacea
- Class: Insecta
- Order: Lepidoptera
- Family: Elachistidae
- Genus: Urodeta
- Species: U. faro

Binomial name
- Urodeta faro Sruoga & J. de Prins, 2011

Species of moth

Urodeta faro is a moth of the family Elachistidae. It is found in Cameroon.

The wingspan is 6–6.6 mm. Adults have been recorded in late April and early May.
