= Urodeta noreikai =

Scientific classification
- Kingdom: Animalia
- Phylum: Arthropoda
- Clade: Pancrustacea
- Class: Insecta
- Order: Lepidoptera
- Family: Elachistidae
- Genus: Urodeta
- Species: U. noreikai

Binomial name
- Urodeta noreikai Sruoga & De Prins, 2013

Species of moth

Urodeta noreikai is a moth of the family Elachistidae. It is found in the Nepalese Himalayas.
