= Perittia nimbifera =

Scientific classification
- Domain: Eukaryota
- Kingdom: Animalia
- Phylum: Arthropoda
- Class: Insecta
- Order: Lepidoptera
- Family: Elachistidae
- Genus: Perittia
- Species: P. nimbifera

Binomial name
- Perittia nimbifera (Meyrick, 1913)

Synonyms
- Elachista nimbifera Meyrick, 1913; Symphoristis ptychospila Meyrick, 1918

Species of moth

Perittia nimbifera is a moth of the family Elachistidae that is endemic to South Africa.
