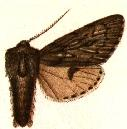

Scientific classification
- Domain: Eukaryota
- Kingdom: Animalia
- Phylum: Arthropoda
- Class: Insecta
- Order: Lepidoptera
- Superfamily: Noctuoidea
- Family: Noctuidae
- Genus: Brachionycha
- Species: B. borealis

Binomial name
- Brachionycha borealis Smith, 1899

= Brachionycha borealis =

Species of moth

Brachionycha borealis is a moth of the family Noctuidae first described by Smith in 1899. It is found in North America from Maine and Pennsylvania west to central Alberta.

The wingspan is about 45 mm. The moth flies from April to May depending on the location. There is one generation per year.

The larvae feed on Quercus and Vaccinium species.
