= Perittia piperatella =

Scientific classification
- Kingdom: Animalia
- Phylum: Arthropoda
- Clade: Pancrustacea
- Class: Insecta
- Order: Lepidoptera
- Family: Elachistidae
- Genus: Perittia
- Species: P. piperatella

Binomial name
- Perittia piperatella (Staudinger, 1859)

Synonyms
- Elachista piperatella Staudinger, 1859; Polymetis piperatella; Mendesia joannisiella Mendes, 1909

Species of moth

Perittia piperatella is a moth of the family Elachistidae. It is found on the Iberian Peninsula.

The wingspan is 8.5–10 mm.

The larvae feed on Cistus ladanifer. They mine the leaves of their host plant. Larvae can be found from November to March.
