= Perittia farinella =

Scientific classification
- Kingdom: Animalia
- Phylum: Arthropoda
- Clade: Pancrustacea
- Class: Insecta
- Order: Lepidoptera
- Family: Elachistidae
- Genus: Perittia
- Species: P. farinella

Binomial name
- Perittia farinella (Thunberg, 1794)

Synonyms
- Tinea farinella Thunberg, 1794; Mendesia farinella; Mendesia subargentella Dattin, 1932

Species of moth

Perittia farinella is a moth of the family Elachistidae. It is found in most of Europe (except Ireland, Norway, the Iberian Peninsula, most of the Balkan Peninsula, Slovakia, Romania and Ukraine).

The wingspan is 12–14 mm.

The larvae probably feed on a species of the family Boraginaceae.
