= Perittia cinereipunctella =

Scientific classification
- Domain: Eukaryota
- Kingdom: Animalia
- Phylum: Arthropoda
- Class: Insecta
- Order: Lepidoptera
- Family: Elachistidae
- Genus: Perittia
- Species: P. cinereipunctella

Binomial name
- Perittia cinereipunctella Turati, 1930

Species of moth

Perittia cinereipunctella is a moth in the family Elachistidae. It was described by Turati in 1930. It is found in Zimbabwe.
