= Perittia ramona =

Scientific classification
- Kingdom: Animalia
- Phylum: Arthropoda
- Class: Insecta
- Order: Lepidoptera
- Family: Elachistidae
- Genus: Perittia
- Species: P. ramona

Binomial name
- Perittia ramona Kaila, 2000

Species of moth

Perittia ramona is a moth in the family Elachistidae. It was described by Lauri Kaila in 2000. It is found in Argentina.
