= Urodeta quadrifida =

Scientific classification
- Kingdom: Animalia
- Phylum: Arthropoda
- Clade: Pancrustacea
- Class: Insecta
- Order: Lepidoptera
- Family: Elachistidae
- Genus: Urodeta
- Species: U. quadrifida

Binomial name
- Urodeta quadrifida J. de Prins & Sruoga, 2012

Species of moth

Urodeta quadrifida is a moth of the family Elachistidae. It is found in South Africa, where it has been recorded from the Tswaing Crater Reserve in Gauteng.

The wingspan is about 6.8 mm. Adults have been recorded on wing in February.
