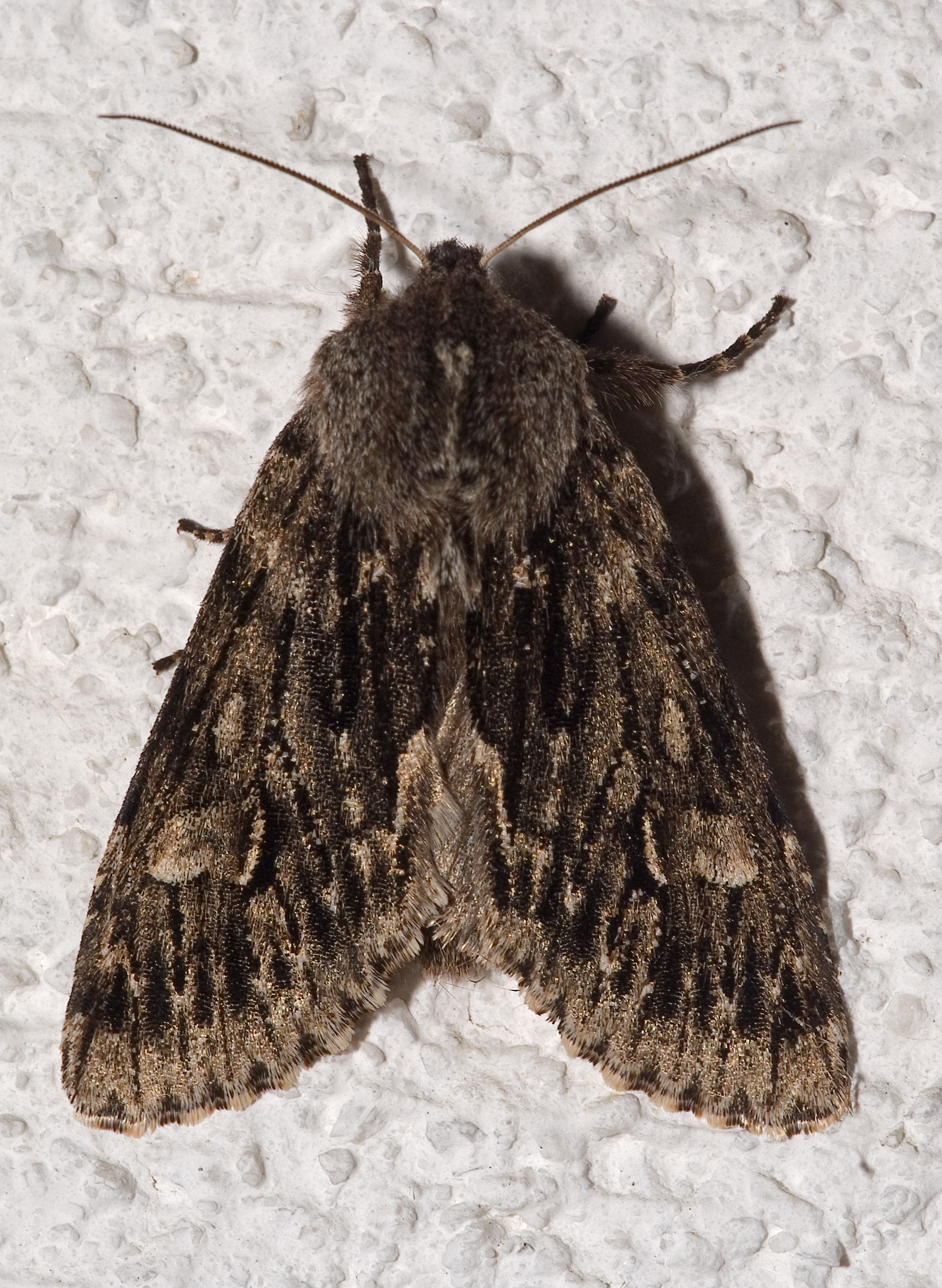
- Brachionycha nubeculosa

Scientific classification
- Kingdom: Animalia
- Phylum: Arthropoda
- Clade: Pancrustacea
- Class: Insecta
- Order: Lepidoptera
- Superfamily: Noctuoidea
- Family: Noctuidae
- Tribe: Psaphidini
- Genus: Brachionycha; Hübner, 1819

Synonyms
- Selenoscopus Heinemann, 1859

= Brachionycha =

Genus of moths

Brachionycha is a genus of moths of the family Noctuidae. The genus was erected by Jacob Hübner in 1819.

== Species ==
- Brachionycha nubeculosa (Esper, 1785) – Rannoch sprawler – Europe, Siberia
- Brachionycha sajana Draudt, 1934 Sajan, Altai, Komi
- Brachionycha borealis (Smith, 1899) Michigan, Wisconsin, Manitoba, Alberta, Saskatchewan, Quebec, Ontario, Pennsylvania, northern West Virginia
- Brachionycha permixta Sugi, 1970 Japan
