= Perittia mucronata =

Scientific classification
- Kingdom: Animalia
- Phylum: Arthropoda
- Clade: Pancrustacea
- Class: Insecta
- Order: Lepidoptera
- Family: Elachistidae
- Genus: Perittia
- Species: P. mucronata

Binomial name
- Perittia mucronata (Parenti, 2001)

Synonyms
- Mendesia mucronata Parenti, 2001

Species of moth

Perittia mucronata is a moth of the family Elachistidae. It is found in Greece.
