= Perittia metaxea =

Scientific classification
- Domain: Eukaryota
- Kingdom: Animalia
- Phylum: Arthropoda
- Class: Insecta
- Order: Lepidoptera
- Family: Elachistidae
- Genus: Perittia
- Species: P. metaxea

Binomial name
- Perittia metaxea (Kaila, 1995)

Synonyms
- Mendesia metaxea Kaila, 1995

Species of moth

Perittia metaxea is a moth of the family Elachistidae. It is found in Texas, United States.

The length of the forewings is about 5 mm.
