= Urodeta crenata =

Scientific classification
- Kingdom: Animalia
- Phylum: Arthropoda
- Clade: Pancrustacea
- Class: Insecta
- Order: Lepidoptera
- Family: Elachistidae
- Genus: Urodeta
- Species: U. crenata

Binomial name
- Urodeta crenata Sruoga & J. de Prins, 2011

Species of moth

Urodeta crenata is a moth of the family Elachistidae. It is found in Cameroon.

The wingspan is 5-5.2 mm. Adults have been recorded in early May.
