= Perittia minitaurella =

Scientific classification
- Kingdom: Animalia
- Phylum: Arthropoda
- Clade: Pancrustacea
- Class: Insecta
- Order: Lepidoptera
- Family: Elachistidae
- Genus: Perittia
- Species: P. minitaurella

Binomial name
- Perittia minitaurella Kaila, 2009

Species of moth

Perittia minitaurella is a moth of the family Elachistidae. It is found in Greece (Crete).
