= Brachionycha sajana =

Scientific classification
- Domain: Eukaryota
- Kingdom: Animalia
- Phylum: Arthropoda
- Class: Insecta
- Order: Lepidoptera
- Superfamily: Noctuoidea
- Family: Noctuidae
- Genus: Brachionycha
- Species: B. sajana

Binomial name
- Brachionycha sajana Draudt, 1934

Species of moth

Brachionycha sajana is a moth of the family Noctuidae. It is found in Eastern Siberia and Irkutsk.
