= Perittia constantinella =

Scientific classification
- Domain: Eukaryota
- Kingdom: Animalia
- Phylum: Arthropoda
- Class: Insecta
- Order: Lepidoptera
- Family: Elachistidae
- Genus: Perittia
- Species: P. constantinella

Binomial name
- Perittia constantinella (Rebel, 1901)

Synonyms
- Elachista constantinella Rebel, 1901; Mendesia constantinella Rebel, 1901

Species of moth

Perittia constantinella is a moth in the family Elachistidae. It was described by Rebel in 1901. It is found in Algeria.
