= Perittia deroga =

Scientific classification
- Kingdom: Animalia
- Phylum: Arthropoda
- Class: Insecta
- Order: Lepidoptera
- Family: Elachistidae
- Genus: Perittia
- Species: P. deroga

Binomial name
- Perittia deroga Kaila, 2011

Species of moth

Perittia deroga is a moth of the family Elachistidae. It is found in New South Wales, Australia.

The wingspan is about 8.8 mm for males.
