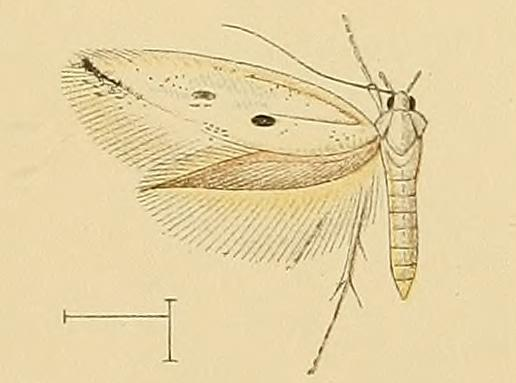

Scientific classification
- Kingdom: Animalia
- Phylum: Arthropoda
- Clade: Pancrustacea
- Class: Insecta
- Order: Lepidoptera
- Family: Elachistidae
- Genus: Perittia
- Species: P. echiella

Binomial name
- Perittia echiella (de Joannis, 1902)

Synonyms
- Mendesia echiella de Joannis, 1902; Mendesia symphytella Walsingham, 1907; Elachista eremella Amsel, 1935; Mendesia podonosmella Amsel, 1931

= Perittia echiella =

Species of moth

Perittia echiella is a moth of the family Elachistidae. It is found on the Iberian Peninsula, Sardinia and Sicily and in Greece.

The wingspan is about 11 mm.

The larvae feed on Echium decaisnei, Echium lusitanicum, Echium plantagineum, Podonosma orientalis and Symphytum species. They mine the leaves of their host plant. Larvae can be found from March onwards.
