= Perittia serica =

Scientific classification
- Domain: Eukaryota
- Kingdom: Animalia
- Phylum: Arthropoda
- Class: Insecta
- Order: Lepidoptera
- Family: Elachistidae
- Genus: Perittia
- Species: P. serica

Binomial name
- Perittia serica (Kaila, 1995)

Synonyms
- Mendesia serica Kaila, 1995

Species of moth

Perittia serica is a moth of the family Elachistidae. It is found in Colorado.

The length of the forewings is about 6 mm.
