= Perittia sepulchrella =

Scientific classification
- Kingdom: Animalia
- Phylum: Arthropoda
- Clade: Pancrustacea
- Class: Insecta
- Order: Lepidoptera
- Family: Elachistidae
- Genus: Perittia
- Species: P. sepulchrella

Binomial name
- Perittia sepulchrella (Stainton, 1872)

Synonyms
- Elachista sepulchrella Stainton, 1872

Species of moth

Perittia sepulchrella is a moth in the family Elachistidae. It was described by Stainton in 1872. It is found in Morocco.
