= Perittia daleris =

Scientific classification
- Kingdom: Animalia
- Phylum: Arthropoda
- Class: Insecta
- Order: Lepidoptera
- Family: Elachistidae
- Genus: Perittia
- Species: P. daleris

Binomial name
- Perittia daleris Kaila, 2011

Species of moth

Perittia daleris is a moth of the family Elachistidae. It is found in Western Australia.

The wingspan is 9.8–10.5 mm for males.
