= Perittia pachyzona =

Scientific classification
- Kingdom: Animalia
- Phylum: Arthropoda
- Clade: Pancrustacea
- Class: Insecta
- Order: Lepidoptera
- Family: Elachistidae
- Genus: Perittia
- Species: P. pachyzona

Binomial name
- Perittia pachyzona (Meyrick, 1921)

Synonyms
- Phthinostoma pachyzona Meyrick, 1921

Species of moth

Perittia pachyzona is a moth of the family Elachistidae. It is found in South Africa.

The wingspan is about 7 mm. The forewings are white irregularly speckled with black and the basal area mixed with grey. There is a broad slightly oblique blackish median fascia, more or less suffused with yellow-ochreous posteriorly except at the extremities, the ground colour clearer white before and beyond this. The second discal stigma is black, surrounded with white, and then by an irregular ring of ochreous suffusion. The hindwings are grey.
