= Perittia smaragdophanes =

Scientific classification
- Kingdom: Animalia
- Phylum: Arthropoda
- Class: Insecta
- Order: Lepidoptera
- Family: Elachistidae
- Genus: Perittia
- Species: P. smaragdophanes

Binomial name
- Perittia smaragdophanes (Meyrick, 1932)

Synonyms
- Aristoptila smaragdophanes Meyrick, 1932

Species of moth

Perittia smaragdophanes is a moth in the family Elachistidae. It was described by Edward Meyrick in 1932. It is found in Ecuador.
