= Perittia tectusella =

Scientific classification
- Kingdom: Animalia
- Phylum: Arthropoda
- Clade: Pancrustacea
- Class: Insecta
- Order: Lepidoptera
- Family: Elachistidae
- Genus: Perittia
- Species: P. tectusella

Binomial name
- Perittia tectusella Sruoga, 1997

Species of moth

Perittia tectusella is a moth in the family Elachistidae. It was described by Sruoga in 1997. It is found in Central Asia, where it has been recorded from Tajikistan.

The wingspan is 6.1-7.7 mm.

The larvae feed on Lonirica korolkowii. They mine the leaves of their host plant.
