= Perittia ochrella =

Scientific classification
- Kingdom: Animalia
- Phylum: Arthropoda
- Clade: Pancrustacea
- Class: Insecta
- Order: Lepidoptera
- Family: Elachistidae
- Genus: Perittia
- Species: P. ochrella

Binomial name
- Perittia ochrella (Sinev, 1992)

Synonyms
- Perittoides ochrella Sinev, 1992

Species of moth

Perittia ochrella is a moth in the family Elachistidae. It was described by Sinev in 1992. It is found in the Russian Far East and Japan.
