= Perittia spermatopis =

Scientific classification
- Kingdom: Animalia
- Phylum: Arthropoda
- Class: Insecta
- Order: Lepidoptera
- Family: Elachistidae
- Genus: Perittia
- Species: P. spermatopis

Binomial name
- Perittia spermatopis (Meyrick, 1933)

Synonyms
- Zemiocrita spermatopis Meyrick, 1933

Species of moth

Perittia spermatopis is a moth in the family Elachistidae. It was described by Edward Meyrick in 1933. It is found in Argentina.
