= Urodeta acinacella =

Scientific classification
- Kingdom: Animalia
- Phylum: Arthropoda
- Clade: Pancrustacea
- Class: Insecta
- Order: Lepidoptera
- Family: Elachistidae
- Genus: Urodeta
- Species: U. acinacella

Binomial name
- Urodeta acinacella J. De Prins & Sruoga, 2012

Species of moth

Urodeta acinacella is a moth of the family Elachistidae first described by Jurate De Prins and Virginijus Sruoga in 2012. It is found in South Africa, where it has been recorded from the Tswaing Crater Reserve in Gauteng.

The wingspan is 5.6–6.5 mm. Adults have been recorded on wing in November.

== Etymology ==
The specific name refers to the shape of the signum and is derived from Latin acinaces (meaning short sword, short saber, scimitar).

== Taxonomy ==
It took almost 150 years to identify more species of this once single-species genus, in addition to the main species U. hibernella. Kaila moved six Afrotropical species that were formerly connected to Phthinostoma Meyrick and Perittia Stainton to Urodeta in a thorough study on Australian Elachistinae. Following Elachista, Urodeta is now the second most diverse genus of Elachistinae in the Afrotropics as a result of current research findings. We present three newly discovered Urodeta species from South Africa in this paper.
