= Perittia eremonoma =

Scientific classification
- Domain: Eukaryota
- Kingdom: Animalia
- Phylum: Arthropoda
- Class: Insecta
- Order: Lepidoptera
- Family: Elachistidae
- Genus: Perittia
- Species: P. eremonoma

Binomial name
- Perittia eremonoma (Braun, 1948)

Synonyms
- Onceroptila eremonoma Braun, 1948; Annettenia eremonoma (Braun, 1948)

Species of moth

Perittia eremonoma is a moth of the family Elachistidae described by Annette Frances Braun in 1948. It is found in the United States from Oregon, Utah, Nebraska and Colorado to California.

The length of the forewings is 4–4.5 mm.
