= Urodeta inusta =

Scientific classification
- Kingdom: Animalia
- Phylum: Arthropoda
- Class: Insecta
- Order: Lepidoptera
- Family: Elachistidae
- Genus: Urodeta
- Species: U. inusta

Binomial name
- Urodeta inusta Kaila, 2011

Species of moth

Urodeta inusta is a moth of the family Elachistidae. It is found in north-western Western Australia.

The wingspan is 7.2–7.8 mm for males and 7-7.2 mm for females.
