= Perittia unifasciella =

Scientific classification
- Kingdom: Animalia
- Phylum: Arthropoda
- Clade: Pancrustacea
- Class: Insecta
- Order: Lepidoptera
- Family: Elachistidae
- Genus: Perittia
- Species: P. unifasciella

Binomial name
- Perittia unifasciella Sinev, 1992

Species of moth

Perittia unifasciella is a moth in the family Elachistidae. It was described by Sinev in 1992. It is found in the Russian Far East.
