= Perittia antauges =

Scientific classification
- Kingdom: Animalia
- Phylum: Arthropoda
- Class: Insecta
- Order: Lepidoptera
- Family: Elachistidae
- Genus: Perittia
- Species: P. antauges

Binomial name
- Perittia antauges Kaila, 2011

Species of moth

Perittia antauges is a moth of the family Elachistidae. It is found in Western Australia.

The wingspan is 8.8–10.9 mm for males.
