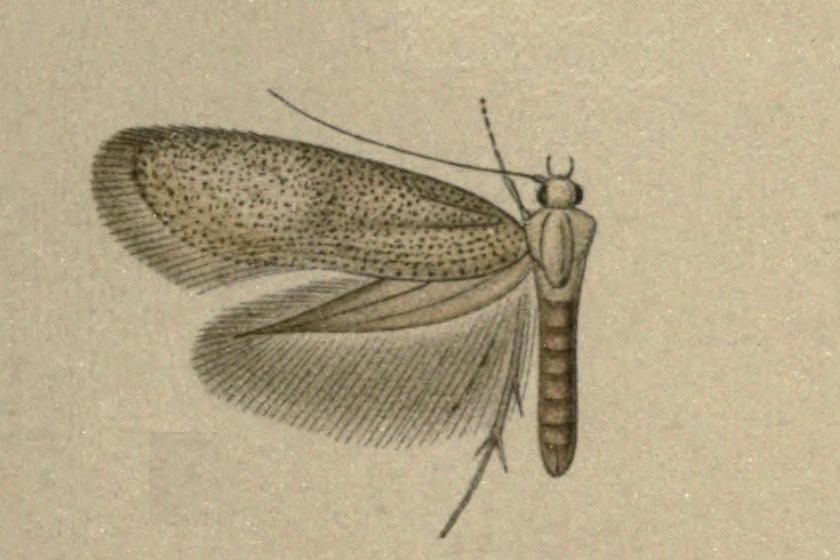

Scientific classification
- Kingdom: Animalia
- Phylum: Arthropoda
- Clade: Pancrustacea
- Class: Insecta
- Order: Lepidoptera
- Family: Elachistidae
- Genus: Perittia
- Species: P. carlinella

Binomial name
- Perittia carlinella (Walsingham, 1908)

Synonyms
- Polymetis carlinella Walsingham, 1908; Metzneria carlinella

= Perittia carlinella =

Species of moth

Perittia carlinella is a moth of the family Elachistidae. It is found on the Canary Islands and Madeira.

The wingspan is 10–11 mm. The forewings are white, dusted with pale greyish brown scales. The hindwings are grey.

The larvae feed on Carlina salicifolia. They mine the leaves of their host plant. Larvae can be found from March to April.
