= Perittia karadaghella =

Scientific classification
- Kingdom: Animalia
- Phylum: Arthropoda
- Clade: Pancrustacea
- Class: Insecta
- Order: Lepidoptera
- Family: Elachistidae
- Genus: Perittia
- Species: P. karadaghella

Binomial name
- Perittia karadaghella Sinev & Budashkin, 1991

Species of moth

Perittia karadaghella is a moth of the family Elachistidae. It is found in Ukraine and Turkey.
