= Perittia secutrix =

Scientific classification
- Kingdom: Animalia
- Phylum: Arthropoda
- Class: Insecta
- Order: Lepidoptera
- Family: Elachistidae
- Genus: Perittia
- Species: P. secutrix

Binomial name
- Perittia secutrix (Meyrick, 1914)

Synonyms
- Mendesia secutrix Meyrick, 1914

Species of moth

Perittia secutrix is a moth of the family Elachistidae. It is found in South Africa.

The wingspan is 11–13 mm. The forewings are ochreous-whitish and the hindwings are pale greyish.
