= Perittia ravida =

Scientific classification
- Kingdom: Animalia
- Phylum: Arthropoda
- Clade: Pancrustacea
- Class: Insecta
- Order: Lepidoptera
- Family: Elachistidae
- Genus: Perittia
- Species: P. ravida

Binomial name
- Perittia ravida Kaila, 2009

Species of moth

Perittia ravida is a moth of the family Elachistidae. It is found in Turkey and Greece.
