= Urodeta hibernella =

Scientific classification
- Kingdom: Animalia
- Phylum: Arthropoda
- Class: Insecta
- Order: Lepidoptera
- Family: Elachistidae
- Genus: Urodeta
- Species: U. hibernella

Binomial name
- Urodeta hibernella (Staudinger, 1859)

Synonyms
- Butalis hibernella Staudinger, 1859; Urodeta cisticolella Stainton, 1869

Species of moth

Urodeta hibernella is a moth of the family Elachistidae. It is known from France, Corsica and the Iberian Peninsula.

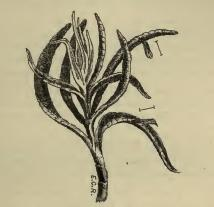
Mine

The larvae feed on Cistus monspeliensis and Helianthemum. They mine the leaves of their host plant.
