= Perittia aganopa =

Scientific classification
- Kingdom: Animalia
- Phylum: Arthropoda
- Class: Insecta
- Order: Lepidoptera
- Family: Elachistidae
- Genus: Perittia
- Species: P. aganopa

Binomial name
- Perittia aganopa (Meyrick, 1911)

Synonyms
- Mendesia aganopa Meyrick, 1911; Perittia aganope

Species of moth

Perittia aganopa is a moth of the family Elachistidae. It is found in South Africa.
