= Perittia infumata =

Scientific classification
- Kingdom: Animalia
- Phylum: Arthropoda
- Class: Insecta
- Order: Lepidoptera
- Family: Elachistidae
- Genus: Perittia
- Species: P. infumata

Binomial name
- Perittia infumata (Meyrick, 1914)

Synonyms
- Phthinostoma infumata Meyrick, 1914

Species of moth

Perittia infumata is a moth of the family Elachistidae. It is found in South Africa.

The wingspan is 6–8 mm. The forewings are grey-whitish irrorated with blackish. There are narrow obscure very oblique fasciae of denser irroration from the costa before and beyond the middle, the latter running to the termen above the tornus. A basal patch and cloudy spot on the fold before the middle are also obscurely defined. The hindwings are grey.
