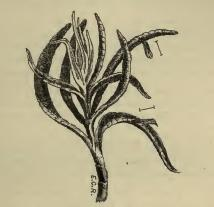
- Urodeta hibernella

Scientific classification
- Kingdom: Animalia
- Phylum: Arthropoda
- Clade: Pancrustacea
- Class: Insecta
- Order: Lepidoptera
- Family: Elachistidae
- Subfamily: Elachistinae
- Genus: Urodeta; Stainton, 1869

Synonyms
- Urodela Stainton, 1869

= Urodeta =

Genus of moths

Urodeta is a genus of moths of the family Elachistidae. The genus was originally assigned to the family Momphidae.

== Species ==
- Urodeta absidata Sruoga & J. de Prins, 2011
- Urodeta acerba Sruoga & J. de Prins, 2011
- Urodeta acinacella J. de Prins & Sruoga, 2012
- Urodeta aculeata Sruoga & J. de Prins, 2011
- Urodeta bucera Sruoga & J. de Prins, 2011
- Urodeta crenata Sruoga & J. de Prins, 2011
- Urodeta cuspidis Sruoga & J. de Prins, 2011
- Urodeta falciferella (Sruoga & De Prins, 2009) (previously in Perittia)
- Urodeta faro Sruoga & J. de Prins, 2011
- Urodeta gnoma (Sruoga & De Prins, 2009) (previously in Perittia)
- Urodeta hibernella (Staudinger 1859)
- Urodeta inusta Kaila, 2011
- Urodeta maculata (Mey, 2007) (previously in Phthinostoma)
- Urodeta noreikai Sruoga & De Prins, 2013
- Urodeta quadrifida J. de Prins & Sruoga, 2012
- Urodeta spatulata (Sruoga & De Prins, 2009) (previously in Perittia)
- Urodeta taeniata (Mey, 2007) (previously in Phthinostoma)
- Urodeta talea Sruoga & J. de Prins, 2011
- Urodeta tantilla (Sruoga & De Prins, 2009) (previously in Perittia)
- Urodeta tortuosa Sruoga & J. de Prins, 2011
- Urodeta trilobata J. de Prins & Sruoga, 2012
