= Perittia eselkopensis =

Scientific classification
- Kingdom: Animalia
- Phylum: Arthropoda
- Clade: Pancrustacea
- Class: Insecta
- Order: Lepidoptera
- Family: Elachistidae
- Genus: Perittia
- Species: P. eselkopensis

Binomial name
- Perittia eselkopensis Mey, 2011

Species of moth

Perittia eselkopensis is a moth in the family Elachistidae. It was described by Wolfram Mey in 2011. It is found in South Africa.
