= Urodeta bucera =

Scientific classification
- Kingdom: Animalia
- Phylum: Arthropoda
- Clade: Pancrustacea
- Class: Insecta
- Order: Lepidoptera
- Family: Elachistidae
- Genus: Urodeta
- Species: U. bucera

Binomial name
- Urodeta bucera Sruoga & J. de Prins, 2011

Species of moth

Urodeta bucera is a moth of the family Elachistidae. It is found in the Democratic Republic of the Congo.

The wingspan is 5.1–5.8 mm.
