= Urodeta gnoma =

Scientific classification
- Kingdom: Animalia
- Phylum: Arthropoda
- Clade: Pancrustacea
- Class: Insecta
- Order: Lepidoptera
- Family: Elachistidae
- Genus: Urodeta
- Species: U. gnoma

Binomial name
- Urodeta gnoma (Sruoga & De Prins, 2009)

Synonyms
- Perittia gnoma Sruoga & De Prins, 2009

Species of moth

Urodeta gnoma is a moth of the family Elachistidae. It is found in Kenya.

The wingspan is 5.2–5.9 mm.

== Etymology ==
The species name refers to the small body size of the species and is derived from Latin gnomus (meaning dwarf).
