= Urodeta falciferella =

Scientific classification
- Kingdom: Animalia
- Phylum: Arthropoda
- Clade: Pancrustacea
- Class: Insecta
- Order: Lepidoptera
- Family: Elachistidae
- Genus: Urodeta
- Species: U. falciferella

Binomial name
- Urodeta falciferella (Sruoga & De Prins, 2009)

Synonyms
- Perittia falciferella Sruoga & De Prins, 2009

Species of moth

Urodeta falciferella is a moth of the family Elachistidae. It is found in Kenya.

The wingspan is 7.3–8.1 mm.

== Etymology ==
The species name refers to the shape of the signum and is derived from Latin falcifera (meaning carrying a scythe or sickle).
