= Urodeta spatulata =

Scientific classification
- Kingdom: Animalia
- Phylum: Arthropoda
- Clade: Pancrustacea
- Class: Insecta
- Order: Lepidoptera
- Family: Elachistidae
- Genus: Urodeta
- Species: U. spatulata

Binomial name
- Urodeta spatulata (Sruoga & De Prins, 2009)

Synonyms
- Perittia spatulata Sruoga & De Prins, 2009

Species of moth

Urodeta spatulata is a moth of the family Elachistidae. It is found in Kenya.

The wingspan is 3.9–4.9 mm.
