= Urodeta maculata =

Scientific classification
- Kingdom: Animalia
- Phylum: Arthropoda
- Clade: Pancrustacea
- Class: Insecta
- Order: Lepidoptera
- Family: Elachistidae
- Genus: Urodeta
- Species: U. maculata

Binomial name
- Urodeta maculata (Mey, 2007)

Synonyms
- Phthinostoma maculata Mey, 2007

Species of moth

Urodeta maculata is a moth of the family Elachistidae. It is found in Namibia.
