= Urodeta tantilla =

Scientific classification
- Kingdom: Animalia
- Phylum: Arthropoda
- Clade: Pancrustacea
- Class: Insecta
- Order: Lepidoptera
- Family: Elachistidae
- Genus: Urodeta
- Species: U. tantilla

Binomial name
- Urodeta tantilla (Sruoga & De Prins, 2009)

Synonyms
- Perittia tantilla Sruoga & De Prins, 2009

Species of moth

Urodeta tantilla is a moth of the family Elachistidae. It is found in Kenya.

== Etymology ==
The species name refers to the very small size of the species and is derived from Latin tantillus (meaning so small).
