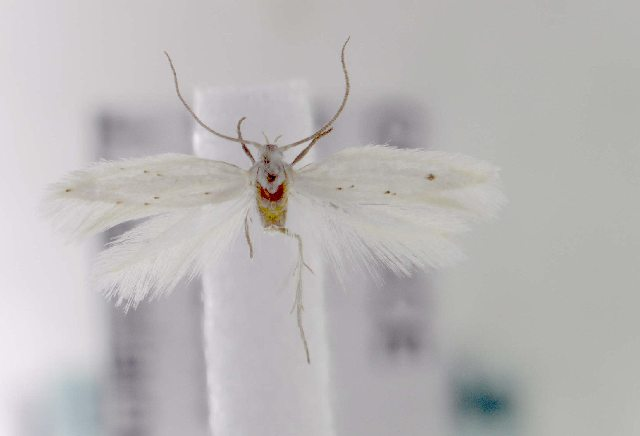

Scientific classification
- Domain: Eukaryota
- Kingdom: Animalia
- Phylum: Arthropoda
- Class: Insecta
- Order: Lepidoptera
- Family: Elachistidae
- Genus: Elachista
- Species: E. parvula

Binomial name
- Elachista parvula Parenti, 1978

= Elachista parvula =

Species of moth

Elachista parvula is a moth of the family Elachistidae. It is found in France, Switzerland, Italy and Bulgaria. However, some sources say it can be found in North Macedonia, Greece, Turkey and Ukraine.
