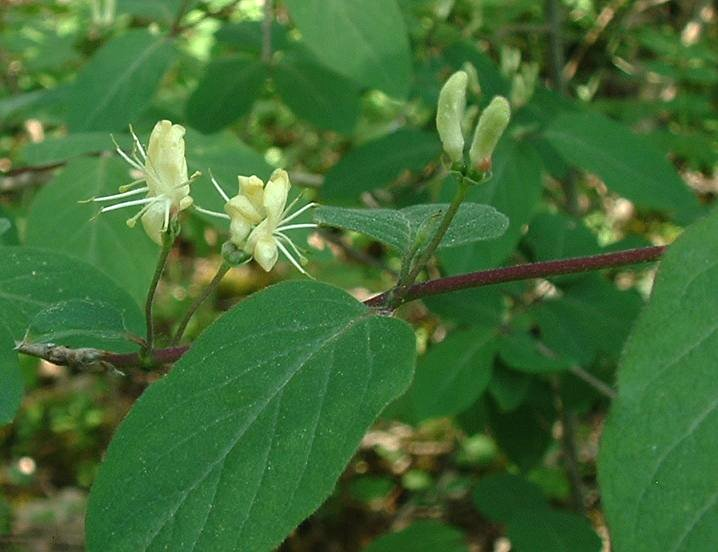

Scientific classification
- Kingdom: Plantae
- Clade: Tracheophytes
- Clade: Angiosperms
- Clade: Eudicots
- Clade: Asterids
- Order: Dipsacales
- Family: Caprifoliaceae
- Genus: Lonicera
- Species: L. xylosteum

Binomial name
- Lonicera xylosteum L.

= Lonicera xylosteum =

Species of honeysuckle plant

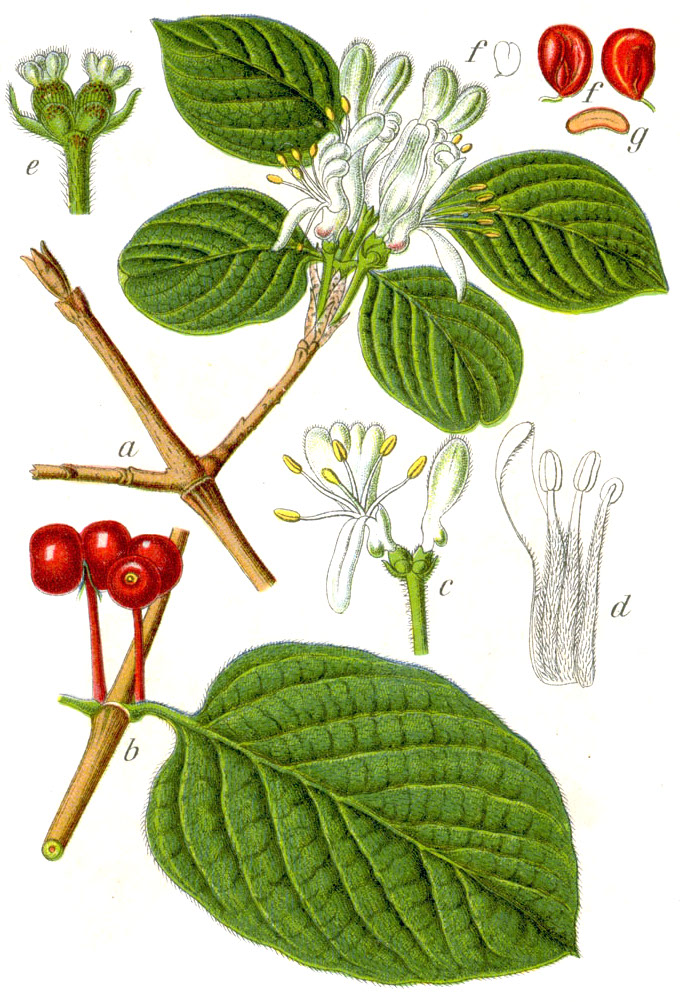
Lonicera xylosteum

Lonicera xylosteum, commonly known as fly honeysuckle, European fly honeysuckle, dwarf honeysuckle or fly woodbine is a deciduous shrub.

Its fruit persists for an average of 15.4 days, and bears an average of 4.5 seeds per fruit. Fruits average 88.6% water, and their dry weight includes 43.4% carbohydrates and 1.2% lipids.

The glossy red (or occasionally yellow) berries of this shrub are mildly poisonous to humans – children who ingest a large number (c. 30) of berries may experience abdominal pain and vomiting.

== Bibliography ==
- Ehrlén, Johan; Eriksson, Ove (1991). "Phenological variation in fruit characteristics in vertebrate-dispersed plants". Oecologia. 86 (4): 463–470. doi:10.1007/BF00318311. ISSN 0029-8549.
