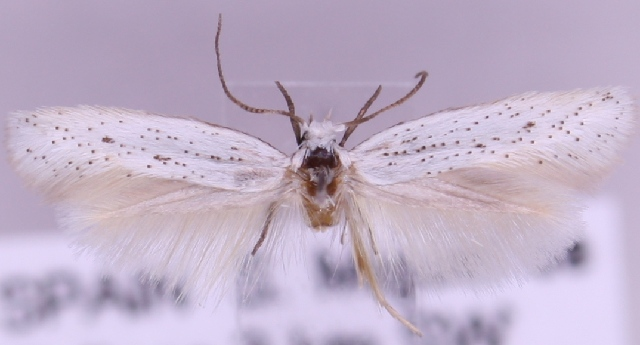

Scientific classification
- Kingdom: Animalia
- Phylum: Arthropoda
- Class: Insecta
- Order: Lepidoptera
- Family: Elachistidae
- Genus: Elachista
- Species: E. tribertiella

Binomial name
- Elachista tribertiella Traugott-Olsen, 1985

= Elachista tribertiella =

Species of moth

Elachista tribertiella is a moth of the family Elachistidae that is endemic to Spain.
