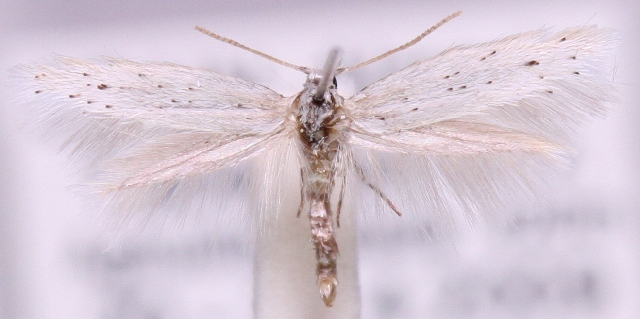

Scientific classification
- Kingdom: Animalia
- Phylum: Arthropoda
- Class: Insecta
- Order: Lepidoptera
- Family: Elachistidae
- Genus: Elachista
- Species: E. glaseri

Binomial name
- Elachista glaseri Traugott-Olsen, 1992

= Elachista glaseri =

Species of moth

Elachista glaseri is a moth of the family Elachistidae, that is endemic to Spain.
