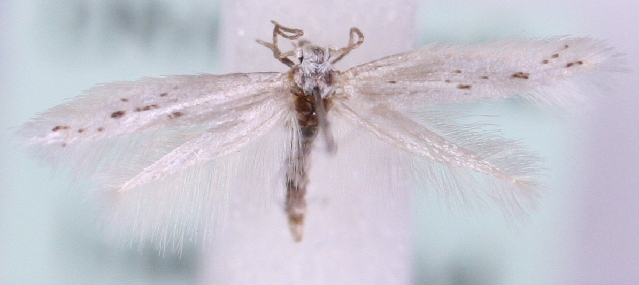

Scientific classification
- Domain: Eukaryota
- Kingdom: Animalia
- Phylum: Arthropoda
- Class: Insecta
- Order: Lepidoptera
- Family: Elachistidae
- Genus: Elachista
- Species: E. dispunctella

Binomial name
- Elachista dispunctella (Duponchel, 1843)

Synonyms
- Oecophora dispunctella Duponchel, 1843

= Elachista dispunctella =

Species of moth

Elachista dispunctella is a moth of the family Elachistidae. It is found in most of Europe, except most of the Balkan Peninsula, Fennoscandia, the Benelux, Portugal, Great Britain, Ireland and Iceland.

Adults are on wing from April to May and again from July to August.

The larvae feed on Festuca species, including Festuca ovina and Festuca duriuscula. They mine the blades of their host plant. Larvae can be found from April to May and again from June to July.
