= Ernst Christian Traugott-Olsen =

Danish entomologist

- Died: 2004
- Citizenship: Danish
- Known for: Research on Elachistidae and Danish Microlepidoptera
- Scientific career
- Fields: Entomology
- Institutions: Natural History Museum of Denmark

Ernst Christian Traugott-Olsen (died 2004) was a Danish entomologist specialising in Lepidoptera, particularly the micro-moth family Elachistidae. He co-authored the taxonomic monograph The Elachistidae (Lepidoptera) of Fennoscandia and Denmark.. Several insect species have been named after him in his honour, e.g. Neotelphusa traugotti, Parornix traugotti, Coleophora traugotti, Scythris traugotti, and Palaeoelachista traugottolseni.

== See also ==
- Category:Taxa named by Ernst Christian Traugott-Olsen
