= Elachista adelpha =

Scientific classification
- Kingdom: Animalia
- Phylum: Arthropoda
- Class: Insecta
- Order: Lepidoptera
- Family: Elachistidae
- Genus: Elachista
- Species: E. adelpha

Binomial name
- Elachista adelpha Kaila & Jalava, 1994

Species of moth

Elachista adelpha is a moth of the family Elachistidae. It is found in the northern Caucasus.
