= Elachista jaskai =

Scientific classification
- Kingdom: Animalia
- Phylum: Arthropoda
- Class: Insecta
- Order: Lepidoptera
- Family: Elachistidae
- Genus: Elachista
- Species: E. jaskai

Binomial name
- Elachista jaskai Kaila, 1998

Species of moth

Elachista jaskai is a moth of the family Elachistidae that is found in northern Russia.
