= Elachista virgatula =

Scientific classification
- Domain: Eukaryota
- Kingdom: Animalia
- Phylum: Arthropoda
- Class: Insecta
- Order: Lepidoptera
- Family: Elachistidae
- Genus: Elachista
- Species: E. virgatula

Binomial name
- Elachista virgatula Kaila, 1997

Synonyms
- Phigalia albella Chambers, 1875 (not Elachista albella (Chambers, 1877)); Elachista albella

Species of moth

Elachista virgatula is a moth of the family Elachistidae. It was introduced as a replacement name for the preoccupied Elachista albella (Chambers, 1875) (=Phigalia albella Chambers, 1875). It occurs in the interior of North America, with records from Alberta, Manitoba, and Saskatchewan in Canada and from Arizona, Colorado, Nebraska, South Dakota, and Wyoming in the United States.

The length of the forewings is 4.5–6.9 millimetres (0.18–0.27 in).

== Etymology ==
The species name is derived from Latin virgatula (meaning striped).
