= Elachista achrantella =

Scientific classification
- Domain: Eukaryota
- Kingdom: Animalia
- Phylum: Arthropoda
- Class: Insecta
- Order: Lepidoptera
- Family: Elachistidae
- Genus: Elachista
- Species: E. achrantella

Binomial name
- Elachista achrantella Kaila, 1997

Species of moth

Elachista achrantella is a moth of the family Elachistidae. It is found in North America in Saskatchewan and Colorado.

The length of the forewings is 4.2–5.7 mm.
