= Elachista arduella =

Scientific classification
- Kingdom: Animalia
- Phylum: Arthropoda
- Class: Insecta
- Order: Lepidoptera
- Family: Elachistidae
- Genus: Elachista
- Species: E. arduella

Binomial name
- Elachista arduella Kaila, 2003

Species of moth

Elachista arduella is a moth of the family Elachistidae. It is found in Russia (the Southern Ural Mountains).

The wingspan is about 7.6 mm.
