= Elachista ossuaria =

Scientific classification
- Domain: Eukaryota
- Kingdom: Animalia
- Phylum: Arthropoda
- Class: Insecta
- Order: Lepidoptera
- Family: Elachistidae
- Genus: Elachista
- Species: E. ossuaria

Binomial name
- Elachista ossuaria Kaila, 1997

Species of moth

Elachista ossuaria is a moth of the family Elachistidae first described from Alberta (Canada) and also known from Arizona, Colorado, Montana, and Wyoming (the United States).

The length of the forewings is 4.9–6 millimetres (0.19–0.24 in) and the forewing costa in the basal 1/6 is grey.
