= Elachista aspila =

Scientific classification
- Kingdom: Animalia
- Phylum: Arthropoda
- Class: Insecta
- Order: Lepidoptera
- Family: Elachistidae
- Genus: Elachista
- Species: E. aspila

Binomial name
- Elachista aspila Kaila, 1997

Species of moth

Elachista aspila is a moth of the family Elachistidae. It is found in North America in Washington, Alberta and Oregon.

The length of the forewings is 5.1–5.8 mm.

== Etymology ==
The species name is derived from Greek aspilos (meaning spotless).
