= Elachista gibbera =

Scientific classification
- Kingdom: Animalia
- Phylum: Arthropoda
- Class: Insecta
- Order: Lepidoptera
- Family: Elachistidae
- Genus: Elachista
- Species: E. gibbera

Binomial name
- Elachista gibbera Kaila, 2003

Species of moth

Elachista gibbera is a moth of the family Elachistidae that can be found in Russia (the Cheliabinsk district in the southern Ural Mountains).

The wingspan is 9.9–11.7 mm.
