= Elachista lurida =

Scientific classification
- Domain: Eukaryota
- Kingdom: Animalia
- Phylum: Arthropoda
- Class: Insecta
- Order: Lepidoptera
- Family: Elachistidae
- Genus: Elachista
- Species: E. lurida

Binomial name
- Elachista lurida Kaila, 1997

Species of moth

Elachista lurida is a moth of the family Elachistidae that is found in California.

The length of the forewings is 5.3 millimetres (0.21 in).
