= Elachista acutella =

Scientific classification
- Domain: Eukaryota
- Kingdom: Animalia
- Phylum: Arthropoda
- Class: Insecta
- Order: Lepidoptera
- Family: Elachistidae
- Genus: Elachista
- Species: E. acutella

Binomial name
- Elachista acutella Kaila, 2003

Species of moth

Elachista acutella is a moth of the family Elachistidae. It is found in Russia (the Southern Ural Mountains).

The wingspan is 9.5–10.3 mm.
