= Elachista louisella =

Scientific classification
- Kingdom: Animalia
- Phylum: Arthropoda
- Class: Insecta
- Order: Lepidoptera
- Family: Elachistidae
- Genus: Elachista
- Species: E. louisella

Binomial name
- Elachista louisella Kaila, 1997

Species of moth

Elachista louisella is a moth of the family Elachistidae that is found in California.

The length of the forewings is 5 millimetres (0.20 in).
