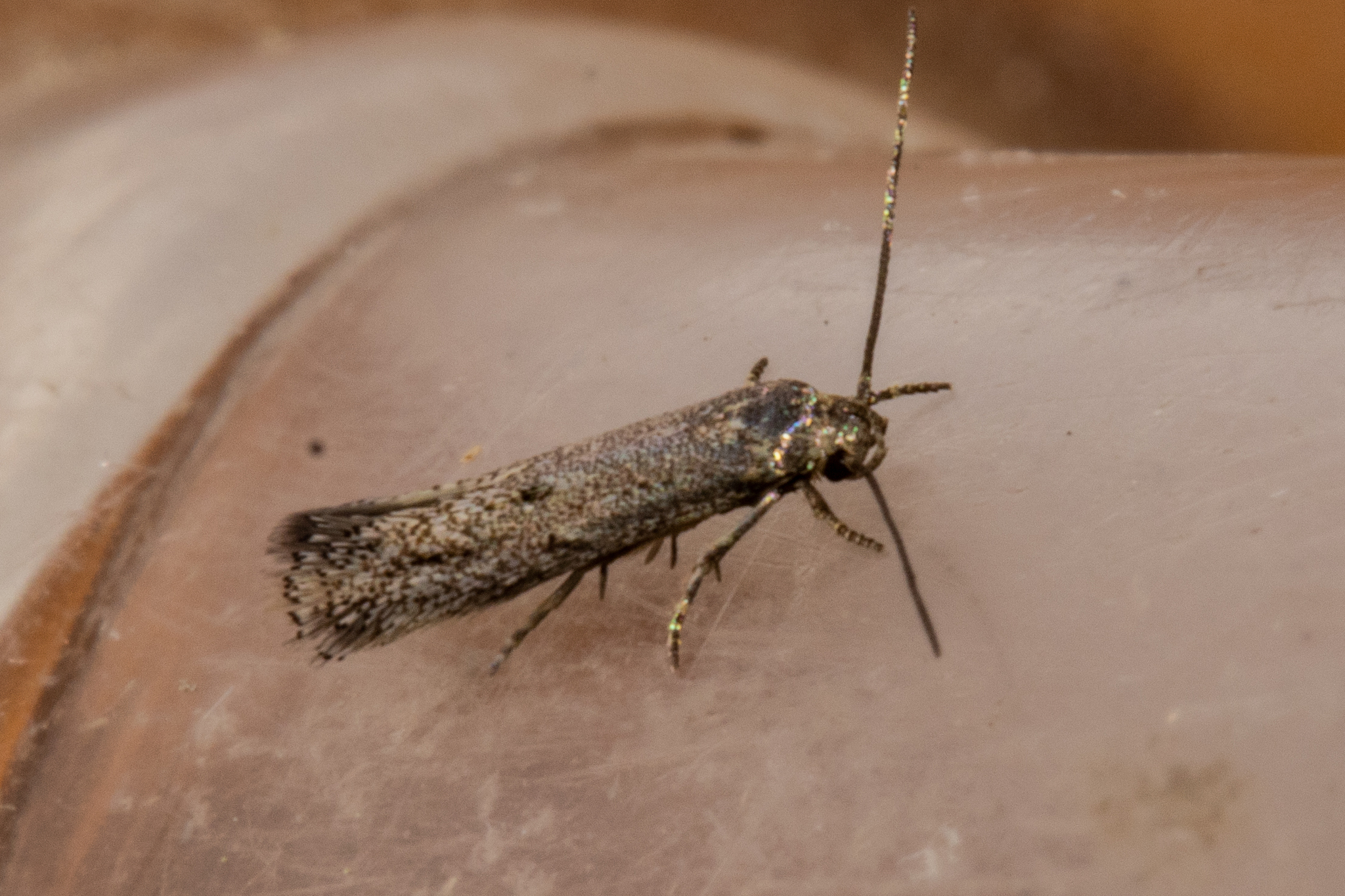

Scientific classification
- Kingdom: Animalia
- Phylum: Arthropoda
- Class: Insecta
- Order: Lepidoptera
- Family: Elachistidae
- Genus: Elachista
- Species: E. ombrodoca

Binomial name
- Elachista ombrodoca Meyrick, 1889

= Elachista ombrodoca =

Species of moth

Elachista ombrodoca is a moth in the family Elachistidae. It was described by Edward Meyrick in 1889. It is found in New Zealand.

The wingspan is 6–8 mm. The forewings are dark grey, irrorated with whitish. The basal area in females is distinctly paler. There is an oblique pale fascia before the middle, which is very obscure and indistinct in males, while it is white and conspicuous in females. Beyond this is a more or less defined blackish suffusion, tending to form two separate spots, the lower more marked. There are indications of a short longitudinal dark fuscous streak in disc at about two-thirds. In females, there are two conspicuous white opposite almost connected spots beyond two-thirds, while they are not traceable in males. The hindwings are grey.
