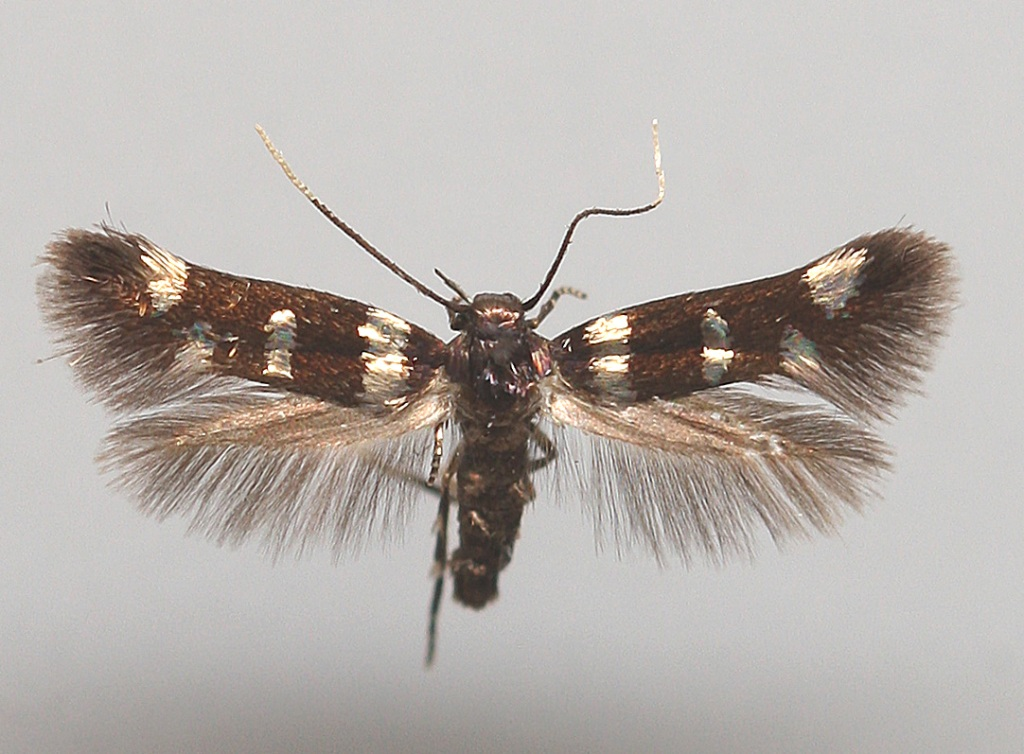

Scientific classification
- Kingdom: Animalia
- Phylum: Arthropoda
- Clade: Pancrustacea
- Class: Insecta
- Order: Lepidoptera
- Family: Elachistidae
- Genus: Elachista
- Species: E. tengstromi

Binomial name
- Elachista tengstromi Kaila, Bengtsson, Sulcs & Junnilainen, 2001

= Elachista tengstromi =

Species of moth

Elachista tengstromi is a moth of the family Elachistidae found in Europe and Japan. The moth was formerly considered to be a form of Elachista regificella.

== Description ==
The wingspan is 7–9.3 millimetres (0.28–0.37 in).

The larvae feed on hairy wood-rush (Luzula pilosa).

== Distribution ==
It is found from Fennoscandia to Switzerland and Austria, and from Great Britain to Poland. It is also found in Japan.
