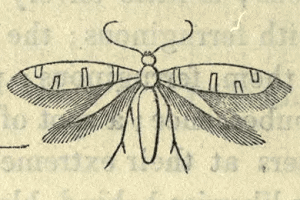

Scientific classification
- Domain: Eukaryota
- Kingdom: Animalia
- Phylum: Arthropoda
- Class: Insecta
- Order: Lepidoptera
- Family: Elachistidae
- Genus: Elachista
- Species: E. regificella

Binomial name
- Elachista regificella Sircom, 1849

= Elachista regificella =

Species of moth

Elachista regificella is a moth of the family Elachistidae, with a restricted distribution in Europe.

== Description ==
The wingspan is about 8 millimetres (0.31 in). Adults are on wing in July in one generation per year.

The larvae feed on greater wood-rush (Luzula sylvatica) mining the leaves of their host plant. Pupation takes place outside of the mine.

== Distribution ==
The moth has been found in Great Britain and Romania. It might also occur in the Netherlands.
