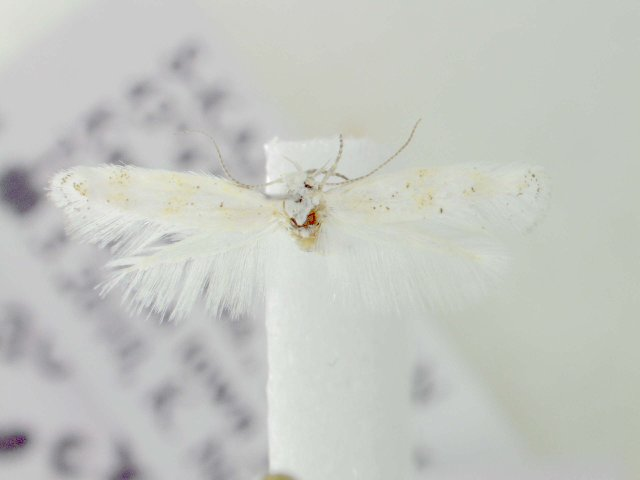

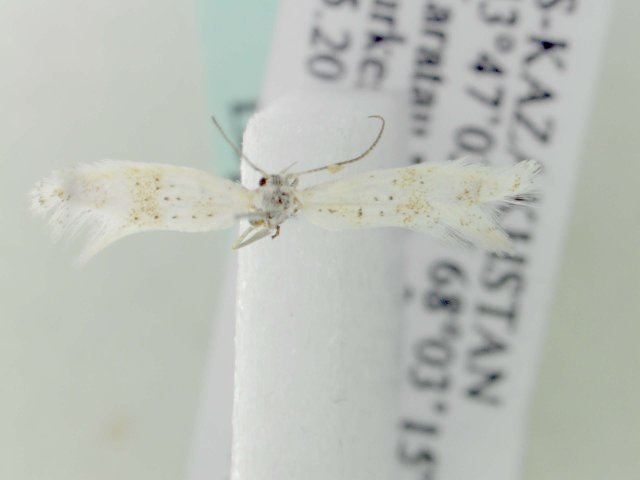

Scientific classification
- Domain: Eukaryota
- Kingdom: Animalia
- Phylum: Arthropoda
- Class: Insecta
- Order: Lepidoptera
- Family: Elachistidae
- Genus: Elachista
- Species: E. szocsi

Binomial name
- Elachista szocsi Parenti, 1978

= Elachista szocsi =

Species of moth

Elachista szocsi is a moth of the family Elachistidae. It is found in Slovakia, Hungary, Russia, Uzbekistan and Kazakhstan.
