= Elachista crocogastra =

Scientific classification
- Kingdom: Animalia
- Phylum: Arthropoda
- Class: Insecta
- Order: Lepidoptera
- Family: Elachistidae
- Genus: Elachista
- Species: E. crocogastra

Binomial name
- Elachista crocogastra Meyrick, 1908

Species of moth

Elachista crocogastra is a moth of the family Elachistidae. It is found in Madagascar and South Africa.

== Description ==
The wingspan is about 6.5 mm. The ground colour of the forewings is yellowish white. The hindwings are white. Adults have been recorded in August, December, February and April.
