= Elachista pollutissima =

Scientific classification
- Kingdom: Animalia
- Phylum: Arthropoda
- Class: Insecta
- Order: Lepidoptera
- Family: Elachistidae
- Genus: Elachista
- Species: E. pollutissima

Binomial name
- Elachista pollutissima Staudinger, 1880

Species of moth

Elachista pollutissima is a moth of the family Elachistidae. It is found in Turkey.
