= List of moths of the United States =

This is a list of moths of the United States.

== List ==
- Abablemma brimleyana
- Abagrotis alternata
- Abagrotis brunneipennis
- Abagrotis cupida
- Abagrotis discoidalis
- Abagrotis dodi
- Abagrotis glenni
- Abagrotis hermina
- Abagrotis magnicupida
- Abagrotis mirabilis
- Abagrotis nefascia
- Abagrotis rubricundis
- Abrenthia cuprea
- Acalyptris bicornutus
- Acalyptris bipinnatellus
- Acalyptris distaleus
- Acalyptris lotella
- Acalyptris postalatratus
- Acalyptris punctulata
- Acalyptris scirpi
- Acalyptris tenuijuxtus
- Acalyptris thoracealbella
- Acanthopteroctetes aurulenta
- Acanthopteroctetes bimaculata
- Acanthopteroctetes tripunctata
- Acanthopteroctetes unifascia
- Achatia distincta
- Acleris semipurpurana
- Acleris variana
- Acleris youngana
- Acossus centerensis
- Acrapex relicta
- Acrobasis aurorella
- Acrobasis betulivorella
- Acrobasis blanchardorum
- Acrobasis caliginella
- Acrobasis caryalbella
- Acrobasis cirroferella
- Acrobasis comptella
- Acrobasis coryliella
- Acrobasis elyi
- Acrobasis evanescentella
- Acrobasis exsulella
- Acrobasis irrubriella
- Acrobasis juglanivorella
- Acrobasis kylesi
- Acrobasis latifasciella
- Acrobasis minimella
- Acrobasis ostryella
- Acrobasis pallicornella
- Acrobasis texana
- Acrobasis vaccinii
- Acrocercops arbutella
- Acrocercops insulariella
- Acrocercops quinquistrigella
- Acrocercops rhombiferellum
- Acroncosa minima
- Acroncosa similella
- Acronicta beameri
- Acronicta betulae
- Acronicta brumosa
- Acronicta fallax
- Acronicta hastulifera
- Acronicta heitzmani
- Acronicta perblanda
- Acronicta sinescripta
- Acronicta valliscola
- Acroplectis haemanthes
- Adaina zephyria
- Adela oplerella
- Adela thorpella
- Aethes angustana
- Aethes baloghi
- Aethes biscana
- Aethes bomonana
- Aethes fernaldana
- Aethes floccosana
- Aethes heleniana
- Aethes intactana
- Aethes interruptofasciata
- Aethes louisiana
- Aethes matheri
- Aethes mymara
- Aethes obliquana
- Aethes patricia
- Aethes promptana
- Aethes rana
- Aethes sexdentata
- Aethes spartinana
- Aethes terriae
- Aethes vachelliana
- Aethes westratei
- Afeda biloba
- Aglossa electalis
- Aglossa oculalis
- Agnippe laudatella
- Agnorisma badinodis
- Agnorisma bollii
- Agnorisma bugrai
- Agonopterix paulae
- Alberada bidentella
- Alberada californiensis
- Alberada candida
- Alberada franclemonti
- Alberada parabates
- Aleptina arenaria
- Aleptina clinopetes
- Alexicles aspersa
- Alpheias oculiferalis
- Alpheias querula
- Alpheias transferens
- Alpheias vicarilis
- Alucita adriendenisi
- Alypia mariposa
- Alypia wittfeldii
- Ambesa dentifera
- Amorbia knudsoni
- Amorbia vero
- Amphipoea americana
- Amphipoea interoceanica
- Amyelois transitella
- Anacampsis coverdalella
- Anacamptodes fragilaria
- Anadelosemia condigna
- Anadelosemia texanella
- Anagrapha falcifera
- Anaplectoides brunneomedia
- Anatrachyntis coriacella
- Ancylosis morrisonella
- Anderida peorinella
- Andropolia aedon
- Andropolia diversilineata
- Andropolia olorina
- Andropolia theodori
- Anemosella obliquata
- Anicla illapsa
- Anicla lubricans
- Anicla tepperi
- Anisota oslari
- Anisota peigleri
- Anisota senatoria
- Anisota stigma
- Anisota virginiensis
- Anoncia conia
- Anoncia episcia
- Anoncia fasciata
- Anopina ainslieana
- Anopina chiricahuae
- Anopina eleonora
- Anopina hermana
- Anopina silvertonana
- Anopina triangulana
- Anopina wrighti
- Anstenoptilia marmarodactyla
- Antaeotricha arizonensis
- Anterastria teratophora
- Antheraea polyphemus
- Apamea acera
- Apamea albina
- Apamea alia
- Apamea bernardino
- Apamea burgessi
- Apamea cariosa
- Apamea centralis
- Apamea digitula
- Apamea gabrieli
- Apamea remissa
- Apamea rubrirena
- Apantesis nais
- Apantesis vittata
- Apocrisias
- Apomyelois bistriatella
- Apotomops texasana
- Apreta
- Arachnis nedyma
- Archips magnolianus
- Areniscythris brachypteris
- Argyresthia castaneella
- Argyresthia eugeniella
- Argyresthia libocedrella
- Argyresthia luteella
- Argyresthia subreticulata
- Argyresthia thoracella
- Argyrostrotis anilis
- Argyrostrotis flavistriaria
- Argyrotaenia amatana
- Argyrotaenia bialbistriata
- Argyrotaenia burnsorum
- Argyrotaenia burroughsi
- Argyrotaenia cupressae
- Argyrotaenia floridana
- Argyrotaenia franciscana
- Argyrotaenia hodgesi
- Argyrotaenia isolatissima
- Argyrotaenia kimballi
- Argyrotaenia klotsi
- Argyrotaenia lignitaenia
- Argyrotaenia martini
- Argyrotaenia montezumae
- Argyrotaenia niscana
- Argyrotaenia paiuteana
- Argyrotaenia quadrifasciana
- Argyrotaenia quercifoliana
- Argyrotaenia velutinana
- Arivaca albicostella
- Arivaca albidella
- Arivaca artella
- Arivaca linella
- Arivaca ostreella
- Arivaca pimella
- Arivaca poohella
- Arla tenuicornis
- Aroga compositella
- Aroga trialbamaculella
- Arta brevivalvalis
- Arta epicoenalis
- Arta olivalis
- Arta statalis
- Aseptis catalina
- Aspitates aberrata
- Atascosa glareosella
- Atascosa heitzmani
- Autographa californica
- Baileya australis
- Batrachedra decoctor
- Batrachedra libator
- Beet armyworm
- Blastobasis yuccaecolella
- Bleptina caradrinalis
- Cabnia myronella
- Callionima parce
- Caloptilia aceriella
- Caloptilia acerifoliella
- Caloptilia agrifoliella
- Caloptilia atomosella
- Caloptilia behrensella
- Caloptilia diversilobiella
- Caloptilia ferruginella
- Caloptilia flavimaculella
- Caloptilia juglandiella
- Caloptilia macranthes
- Caloptilia minimella
- Caloptilia murtfeldtella
- Caloptilia nondeterminata
- Caloptilia obscuripennella
- Caloptilia ovatiella
- Caloptilia palustriella
- Caloptilia paradoxum
- Caloptilia porphyretica
- Caloptilia quercinigrella
- Caloptilia reticulata
- Caloptilia ribesella
- Caloptilia sanguinella
- Caloptilia sauzalitoeella
- Caloptilia sebastianiella
- Caloptilia violacella
- Cameraria temblorensis
- Caryocolum nearcticum
- Caryocolum protectum
- Catabenoides vitrina
- Catocala andromache
- Catocala andromedae
- Catocala angusi
- Catocala atocala
- Catocala benjamini
- Catocala californiensis
- Catocala dulciola
- Catocala francisca
- Catocala grisatra
- Catocala grotiana
- Catocala herodias
- Catocala irene
- Catocala jair
- Catocala jessica
- Catocala johnsoniana
- Catocala lincolnana
- Catocala maestosa
- Catocala marmorata
- Catocala mcdunnoughi
- Catocala messalina
- Catocala minuta
- Catocala miranda
- Catocala muliercula
- Catocala ophelia
- Catocala orba
- Catocala pretiosa
- Catocala semirelicta hippolyta
- Catocala texanae
- Catocala ulalume
- Catocala violenta
- Ceratophaga vicinella
- Chrysoclista grandis
- Chytonix palliatricula
- Citheronia regalis
- Cleora sublunaria
- Clepsis consimilana
- Clepsis flavidana
- Clydonopteron sacculana
- Cochylichroa hoffmanana
- Coleophora accordella
- Coleophora acutipennella
- Coleophora aenusella
- Coleophora alabama
- Coleophora albacostella
- Coleophora alniella
- Coleophora annulicola
- Coleophora apicialbella
- Coleophora argentella
- Coleophora argentialbella
- Coleophora arizoniella
- Coleophora astericola
- Coleophora atriplicivora
- Coleophora basistrigella
- Coleophora bella
- Coleophora bidens
- Coleophora biforis
- Coleophora biminimmaculella
- Coleophora bipunctella
- Coleophora bistrigella
- Coleophora borea
- Coleophora brunneipennis
- Coleophora chambersella
- Coleophora coenosipennella
- Coleophora cornella
- Coleophora corylifoliella
- Coleophora cratipennella
- Coleophora crinita
- Coleophora demissella
- Coleophora discostriata
- Coleophora entoloma
- Coleophora fagicorticella
- Coleophora fuscostrigella
- Coleophora glaucella
- Coleophora indefinitella
- Coleophora infuscatella
- Coleophora irroratella
- Coleophora leucochrysella
- Coleophora lineapulvella
- Coleophora luteocostella
- Coleophora lynosyridella
- Coleophora nigrostriata
- Coleophora ochrostriata
- Coleophora octagonella
- Coleophora polemoniella
- Coleophora portulacae
- Coleophora prepostera
- Coleophora quadrilineella
- Coleophora quadristrigella
- Coleophora ramitella
- Coleophora sacramenta
- Coleophora sparsipulvella
- Coleophora sparsipuncta
- Coleophora suaedae
- Coleophora suaedicola
- Coleophora subapicis
- Coleophora tenuis
- Coleophora timarella
- Coleophora trilineella
- Coleophora umbratica
- Coleophora vernoniaeella
- Coleophora viburniella
- Coleophora viridicuprella
- Coleophora viscidiflorella
- Coleophora wyethiae
- Coleophora xyridella
- Coleotechnites gibsonella
- Cosmia calami
- Crambus daeckellus
- Cudonigera houstonana
- Decaturia pectinalis
- Deidamia inscriptum
- Depressaria palousella
- Dichomeris furia
- Didasys belae
- Dioryctria fordi
- Dioryctria westerlandi
- Diviana eudoreella
- Dolba hyloeus
- Drasteria convergens
- Drasteria divergens
- Drasteria edwardsii
- Drasteria fumosa
- Drasteria grandirena
- Drasteria graphica
- Drasteria hastingsii
- Drasteria howlandii
- Drasteria inepta
- Drasteria ingeniculata
- Drasteria ochracea
- Drasteria parallela
- Drasteria perplexa
- Drasteria tejonica
- Drasteria walshi
- Drepana arcuata
- Dyotopasta yumaella
- Echinocereta strigalis
- Ectoedemia acanthella
- Ectoedemia andrella
- Ectoedemia anguinella
- Ectoedemia clemensella
- Ectoedemia coruscella
- Ectoedemia grandisella
- Ectoedemia mesoloba
- Ectoedemia nyssaefoliella
- Ectoedemia phleophaga
- Ectoedemia piperella
- Ectoedemia platanella
- Ectoedemia quadrinotata
- Ectoedemia reneella
- Ectoedemia rubifoliella
- Ectoedemia similella
- Ectoedemia trinotata
- Ectoedemia ulmella
- Ectoedemia virgulae
- Elachista absaroka
- Elachista adianta
- Elachista aerinella
- Elachista amrodella
- Elachista anagna
- Elachista angularis
- Elachista aphyodes
- Elachista aredhella
- Elachista argentosa
- Elachista argillacea
- Elachista aristoteliella
- Elachista arthadella
- Elachista brachyelythrifoliella
- Elachista bregorella
- Elachista calusella
- Elachista caranthirella
- Elachista celegormella
- Elachista cerasella
- Elachista ciliigera
- Elachista conidia
- Elachista coniophora
- Elachista controversa
- Elachista daeronella
- Elachista dagnirella
- Elachista diorella
- Elachista dolabella
- Elachista dulcinella
- Elachista eilinella
- Elachista enitescens
- Elachista finarfinella
- Elachista galadella
- Elachista gildorella
- Elachista glenni
- Elachista guilinella
- Elachista haldarella
- Elachista hedionella
- Elachista helodella
- Elachista huron
- Elachista ibunella
- Elachista indisella
- Elachista inopina
- Elachista lenape
- Elachista leucofrons
- Elachista maglorella
- Elachista marachella
- Elachista miriella
- Elachista nienorella
- Elachista nucula
- Elachista parvipulvella
- Elachista pelaena
- Elachista praelineata
- Elachista pusilla
- Elachista radiantella
- Elachista ragnorella
- Elachista rianella
- Elachista sabulella
- Elachista salinaris
- Elachista scobifera
- Elachista serindella
- Elachista sincera
- Elachista solitaria
- Elachista spatiosa
- Elachista staintonella
- Elachista suavella
- Elachista sylvestris
- Elachista symmorpha
- Elachista synopla
- Elachista tauronella
- Elachista telcharella
- Elachista telerella
- Elachista texanica
- Elachista triangulifera
- Elachista tuorella
- Elachista turgonella
- Elachista turinella
- Elachista uniolae
- Elaphria agrotina
- Elaphria nucicolora
- Elaphria subobliqua
- Elophila occidentalis
- Enteucha gilvafascia
- Enyo ocypete
- Epermenia californica
- Epiphyas postvittana
- Erinnyis obscura
- Eriopyga crista
- Estigmene acrea
- Ethmia albitogata
- Ethmia nadia
- Eubaphe meridiana
- Eublemma recta
- Euchromius californicalis
- Eucosmophora sideroxylonella
- Eumorpha fasciatus
- Eupackardia calleta
- Eupithecia acutipennis
- Eupithecia adequata
- Eupithecia agnesata
- Eupithecia albigrisata
- Eupithecia alpinata
- Eupithecia behrensata
- Eupithecia biedermanata
- Eupithecia bivittata
- Eupithecia bolterii
- Eupithecia broui
- Eupithecia carneata
- Eupithecia castellata
- Eupithecia catalinata
- Eupithecia cazieri
- Eupithecia cestata
- Eupithecia cestatoides
- Eupithecia chiricahuata
- Eupithecia classicata
- Eupithecia cognizata
- Eupithecia cretata
- Eupithecia cupressata
- Eupithecia edna
- Eupithecia flavigutta
- Eupithecia gilata
- Eupithecia helena
- Eupithecia herefordaria
- Eupithecia hohokamae
- Eupithecia huachuca
- Eupithecia implorata
- Eupithecia insolabilis
- Eupithecia jamesi
- Eupithecia joanata
- Eupithecia karenae
- Eupithecia litoris
- Eupithecia macdunnoughi
- Eupithecia macfarlandi
- Eupithecia macrocarpata
- Eupithecia mystiata
- Eupithecia nabokovi
- Eupithecia neomexicana
- Eupithecia owenata
- Eupithecia palmata
- Eupithecia peckorum
- Eupithecia penablanca
- Eupithecia persimulata
- Eupithecia pertusata
- Eupithecia phyllisae
- Eupithecia piccata
- Eupithecia plumasata
- Eupithecia prostrata
- Eupithecia purpurissata
- Eupithecia quakerata
- Eupithecia redingtonia
- Eupithecia rindgei
- Eupithecia sabulosata
- Eupithecia segregata
- Eupithecia shirleyata
- Eupithecia sinuata
- Eupithecia sperryi
- Eupithecia subapicata
- Eupithecia subvirens
- Eupithecia suspiciosata
- Eupithecia tricolorata
- Eupithecia uinta
- Eupithecia vicksburgi
- Eupithecia vitreotata
- Eupithecia woodgatata
- Eupithecia zelmira
- Euprora argentiliniella
- Euproserpinus euterpe
- Euproserpinus phaeton
- Euproserpinus wiesti
- Eutelia furcata
- Euxoa aberrans
- Euxoa adumbrata
- Euxoa aequalis
- Euxoa agema
- Euxoa mimallonis
- Euxoa nomas
- Euxoa satiens
- Euxoa simulata
- Euxoa tronellus
- Euzophera aglaeella
- Euzophera magnolialis
- Euzophera ostricolorella
- Euzophera vinnulella
- Evergestis aridalis
- Evergestis borregalis
- Evergestis rimosalis
- Exaeretia scabella
- Fabiola lucidella
- Fomoria pteliaeella
- Fundella argentina
- Gazoryctra confusus
- Glyphipterix californiae
- Glyphipterix unifasciata
- Glyphocistis viridivallis
- Gnamptonychia ventralis
- Gnophaela vermiculata
- Goya ovaliger
- Haimbachia floridalis
- Helcystogramma hystricella
- Helicoverpa zea
- Heliolonche celeris
- Hellinsia auster
- Hellinsia australis
- Hellinsia cadmus
- Hellinsia caudelli
- Hellinsia chlorias
- Hellinsia citrites
- Hellinsia confusus
- Hellinsia contortus
- Hellinsia corvus
- Hellinsia costatus
- Hellinsia elliottii
- Hellinsia eros
- Hellinsia falsus
- Hellinsia fieldi
- Hellinsia fishii
- Hellinsia glenni
- Hellinsia gratiosus
- Hellinsia habecki
- Hellinsia helianthi
- Hellinsia homodactylus
- Hellinsia inconditus
- Hellinsia iobates
- Hellinsia kellicottii
- Hellinsia lacteodactylus
- Hellinsia linus
- Hellinsia longifrons
- Hellinsia luteolus
- Hellinsia medius
- Hellinsia meyricki
- Hellinsia mizar
- Hellinsia pan
- Hellinsia perditus
- Hellinsia phoebus
- Hellinsia pollux
- Hellinsia rigidus
- Hellinsia serenus
- Hellinsia simplicissimus
- Hellinsia subochraceus
- Hellinsia sulphureodactylus
- Hellinsia thor
- Hellinsia thoracica
- Hellinsia tinctus
- Hellinsia triton
- Hellinsia unicolor
- Hellinsia varioides
- Hellinsia varius
- Hellinsia venapunctus
- Hemaris diffinis
- Hemaris gracilis
- Hemaris thetis
- Hemaris thysbe
- Hemiplatytes epia
- Hemiplatytes prosenes
- Holcocera iceryaeella
- Horama panthalon
- Hydraecia micacea
- Hypena abalienalis
- Hypena baltimoralis
- Hypena bijugalis
- Hypena deceptalis
- Hypena edictalis
- Hypena humuli
- Hypena madefactalis
- Hypena manalis
- Hypochalcia ahenella
- Hypotrix basistriga
- Iridopsis pergracilis
- Iscadia aperta
- Keiferia lycopersicella
- Lamprosema victoriae
- Lasionycta uniformis
- Leucoptera smilaciella
- Lineodes fontella
- Loxostege floridalis
- Macaria abydata
- Macaria fissinotata
- Magusa orbifera
- Manduca sexta
- Melitara subumbrella
- Mesepiola specca
- Mocis latipes
- Mompha canicinctella
- Monoptilota pergratialis
- Nedra stewarti
- Nematocampa brehmeata
- Neocrania bifasciata
- Neopalpa donaldtrumpi
- Nola cereella
- Nola involuta
- Oidaematophorus catalinae
- Oiketicus kirbyi
- Opharus muricolor
- Ornarantia dyari
- Oxycnemis fusimacula
- Ozamia fuscomaculella
- Ozamia thalassophila
- Pachysphinx occidentalis
- Palpita maritima
- Paonias excaecatus
- Parategeticula pollenifera
- Paratrea plebeja
- Parochromolopis floridana
- Parornix alta
- Parornix arbitrella
- Parornix arbutifoliella
- Parornix dubitella
- Parornix festinella
- Parornix innotata
- Parornix obliterella
- Parornix strobivorella
- Parornix texanella
- Parornix trepidella
- Parornix vicinella
- Patania silicalis
- Peridroma saucia
- Perittia eremonoma
- Perittia metaxea
- Perittia passula
- Perittia serica
- Phaloesia saucia
- Phalonidia plicana
- Phryganeopsis brunnea
- Phryganidia californica
- Phryganidia californica
- Phyllocnistis insignis
- Phyllocnistis magnoliella
- Phyllocnistis vitegenella
- Phyllodesma americana
- Phyllonorycter apicinigrella
- Phyllonorycter arbutusella
- Phyllonorycter arizonella
- Phyllonorycter bataviella
- Phyllonorycter caryaealbella
- Phyllonorycter celtifoliella
- Phyllonorycter cretaceella
- Phyllonorycter deceptusella
- Phyllonorycter diaphanella
- Phyllonorycter gemmea
- Phyllonorycter holodisci
- Phyllonorycter incanella
- Phyllonorycter insignis
- Phyllonorycter inusitatella
- Phyllonorycter kearfottella
- Phyllonorycter latus
- Phyllonorycter lysimachiaeella
- Phyllonorycter manzanita
- Phyllonorycter memorabilis
- Phyllonorycter mildredae
- Phyllonorycter minutella
- Phyllonorycter obscuricostella
- Phyllonorycter obsoleta
- Phyllonorycter occitanica
- Phyllonorycter olivaeformis
- Phyllonorycter oregonensis
- Phyllonorycter pernivalis
- Phyllonorycter platani
- Phyllonorycter rhododendrella
- Phyllonorycter ribefoliae
- Phyllonorycter rileyella
- Phyllonorycter sandraella
- Phyllonorycter sexnotella
- Phyllonorycter symphoricarpaeella
- Polychrysia esmeralda
- Prodoxus marginatus
- Prorella albida
- Prorella emmedonia
- Prorella leucata
- Prorella mellisa
- Proserpinus clarkiae
- Proserpinus flavofasciata
- Proserpinus lucidus
- Pseudogalleria inimicella
- Pyrausta laticlavia
- Schinia antonio
- Schinia arefacta
- Schinia avemensis
- Schinia carmosina
- Schinia indiana
- Schinia lynda
- Schinia maculata
- Schinia rufipenna
- Scopula aemulata
- Scopula fuscata
- Scopula junctaria
- Scopula plantagenaria
- Semioscopis aurorella
- Semioscopis megamicrella
- Semioscopis merriccella
- Semioscopis packardella
- Sericoplaga externalis
- Sitochroa palealis
- Smerinthus cerisyi
- Smerinthus jamaicensis
- Smerinthus saliceti
- Sparkia immacula
- Sphinx dollii
- Sphinx libocedrus
- Sphinx perelegans
- Sphinx sequoiae
- Sphinx vashti
- Spodoptera albula
- Spodoptera dolichos
- Spodoptera eridania
- Spodoptera frugiperda
- Spodoptera latifascia
- Spodoptera ornithogalli
- Spodoptera pulchella
- Stenoptilia exclamationis
- Stephensia cunilae
- Stigmella altella
- Stigmella amelanchierella
- Stigmella apicialbella
- Stigmella argentifasciella
- Stigmella belfrageella
- Stigmella braunella
- Stigmella ceanothi
- Stigmella cerea
- Stigmella condaliafoliella
- Stigmella diffasciae
- Stigmella flavipedella
- Stigmella heteromelis
- Stigmella inconspicuella
- Stigmella juglandifoliella
- Stigmella longisacca
- Stigmella nigriverticella
- Stigmella pallida
- Stigmella purpuratella
- Stigmella rhamnicola
- Stigmella rhoifoliella
- Stigmella tiliella
- Stigmella unifasciella
- Stigmella variella
- Stigmella villosella
- Symmetrischema pallidochrella
- Sympistis acheron
- Sympistis amun
- Sympistis anubis
- Sympistis arizonensis
- Sympistis aterrima
- Sympistis buto
- Sympistis cherti
- Sympistis chorda
- Sympistis dischorda
- Sympistis doris
- Sympistis dunbari
- Sympistis extremis
- Sympistis figurata
- Sympistis glennyi
- Sympistis greyi
- Sympistis major
- Sympistis mut
- Sympistis ra
- Sympistis ragani
- Sympistis richersi
- Sympistis riparia
- Sympistis sandaraca
- Sympistis semicollaris
- Sympistis shirleyae
- Syngrapha altera
- Syngrapha epigaea
- Syngrapha montana
- Syngrapha orophila
- Syngrapha sackenii
- Syngrapha selecta
- Syngrapha u-aureum
- Tarache albifusa
- Tarache areloides
- Tebenna gemmalis
- Tegeticula california
- Tetracis hirsutaria
- Tetragma gei
- Tiracola grandirena
- Tischeria ceanothi
- Trichocosmia inornata
- Tridentaforma fuscoleuca
- Trifurcula saccharella
- Trocodima fuscipes
- Udea aenigmatica
- Udea vacunalis
- Udea washingtonalis
- Uinta oreadella
- Vespina quercivora
- Xanthopastis regnatrix
- Xestia badicollis
- Xestia elimata
- Xestia normaniana
- Ypsolopha angelicella
- Ypsolopha arizonella
- Ypsolopha barberella
- Ypsolopha buscki
- Ypsolopha cockerella
- Ypsolopha delicatella
- Ypsolopha frustella
- Ypsolopha gerdanella
- Ypsolopha lyonothamnae
- Ypsolopha maculatella
- Ypsolopha manella
- Ypsolopha nella
- Ypsolopha oliviella
- Ypsolopha querciella
- Ypsolopha rubrella
- Ypsolopha schwarziella
- Ypsolopha striatella
- Ypsolopha sublucella
- Ypsolopha undulatella
- Ypsolopha unicipunctella
- Ypsolopha vintrella
- Ypsolopha walsinghamiella
- Zanclognatha atrilineella
- Zanclognatha bryanti
- Zanclognatha dentata
- Zanclognatha laevigata
- Zanclognatha lituralis
- Zanclognatha marcidilinea
- Zanclognatha martha
- Zanclognatha obscuripennis
- Zanclognatha pedipilalis
- Zanclognatha protumnusalis
- Zimmermannia bosquella
