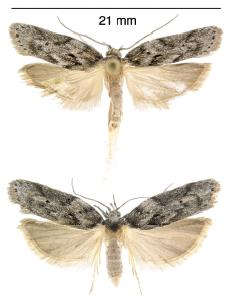
- Male (top), female (bottom)

Scientific classification
- Kingdom: Animalia
- Phylum: Arthropoda
- Clade: Pancrustacea
- Class: Insecta
- Order: Lepidoptera
- Family: Depressariidae
- Genus: Antaeotricha
- Species: A. arizonensis

Binomial name
- Antaeotricha arizonensis Ferris, 2010

= Antaeotricha arizonensis =

Ferris's antaeotricha moth

Species of moth in genus Antaeotricha

Antaeotricha arizonensis (Ferris's antaeotricha) is a moth of the family Depressariidae. It is found in the United States in the mountain ranges in south-eastern Arizona and south-western New Mexico. Although Antaeotricha arizonensis are easily differentiated within their genus through the dark spots on their forewings, the distinction between sexes can be complicated. The sexes of A. arizonensis differentiate between themselves by distinct characteristics on their antennas and anatomy of their genitalia.

The forewing length is 9–11 mm (0.35–0.43 in) and the wingspan is about 21 mm (0.83 in). Adults are on wing from mid-June to October, suggesting more than one generation. Larvae have been reared from Quercus hypoleucoides.

== Etymology ==
The name arizonensis (adjective) denotes the geographic locality from which the species is described.
