= Elachista controversa =

Scientific classification
- Domain: Eukaryota
- Kingdom: Animalia
- Phylum: Arthropoda
- Class: Insecta
- Order: Lepidoptera
- Family: Elachistidae
- Genus: Elachista
- Species: E. controversa

Binomial name
- Elachista controversa Braun, 1923

Species of moth

Elachista controversa is a moth of the family Elachistidae. It is found in California, United States.

The length of the forewings is 5.8 millimetres (0.23 in).
