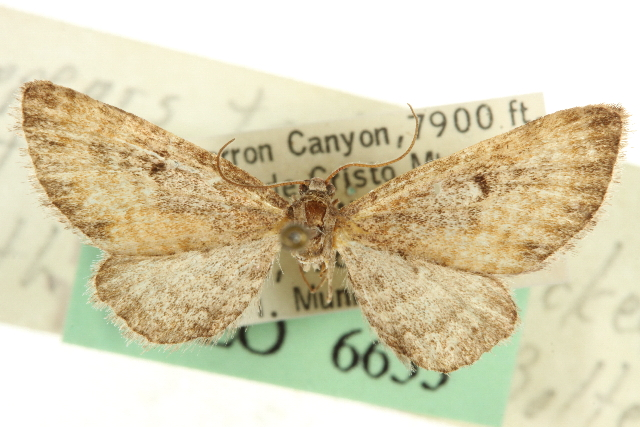
- Eupithecia biedermanata

Scientific classification
- Kingdom: Animalia
- Phylum: Arthropoda
- Clade: Pancrustacea
- Class: Insecta
- Order: Lepidoptera
- Family: Geometridae
- Genus: Eupithecia
- Species: E. biedermanata

Binomial name
- Eupithecia biedermanata Cassino & Swett, 1922

Synonyms
- Eupithecia miamata Cassino, 1925

= Eupithecia biedermanata =

Species of moth

Eupithecia biedermanata is a moth in the family Geometridae first described by Samuel E. Cassino and Louis W. Swett in 1922. It is found in the US state of Arizona.

The length of the forewings is 9–10.5 mm.

The larvae feed on the flowers of Arbutus arizonica.
