= Coleophora suaedae =

Scientific classification
- Kingdom: Animalia
- Phylum: Arthropoda
- Class: Insecta
- Order: Lepidoptera
- Family: Coleophoridae
- Genus: Coleophora
- Species: C. suaedae

Binomial name
- Coleophora suaedae Busck, 1915

Species of moth

Coleophora suaedae is a moth of the family Coleophoridae. It is found in the United States, including California.

The specimen has white labial palpi and a widened antennae towards the base of the structure.

The larvae feed on the leaves of Suaeda suffrudescens.
