= Eupithecia insolabilis =

Scientific classification
- Domain: Eukaryota
- Kingdom: Animalia
- Phylum: Arthropoda
- Class: Insecta
- Order: Lepidoptera
- Family: Geometridae
- Genus: Eupithecia
- Species: E. insolabilis

Binomial name
- Eupithecia insolabilis (Hulst, 1900)

Synonyms
- Tephroclystia insolabilis Hulst, 1900

Species of moth

Eupithecia insolabilis is a moth in the family Geometridae first described by George Duryea Hulst in 1900. It is found in the southern United States, including Utah, Arizona and New Mexico.

The wingspan is about 21 mm. Adults have been recorded on wing from June to August.
