= Ethmia nadia =

Scientific classification
- Kingdom: Animalia
- Phylum: Arthropoda
- Class: Insecta
- Order: Lepidoptera
- Family: Depressariidae
- Genus: Ethmia
- Species: E. nadia

Binomial name
- Ethmia nadia Clarke, 1950

Species of moth

Ethmia nadia is a moth in the family Depressariidae. It is found in California.

The length of the forewings is 7.7–9.7 millimetres (0.30–0.38 in). The ground color of the forewings is dark gray, but paler distally. There are dark spots adjoining a longitudinal streak. Adults are on wing from March to May (in southern California) and from June to July (in Siskiyou County).

The larvae feed on Phacelia ramosissima.
