= Coleophora ramitella =

Scientific classification
- Kingdom: Animalia
- Phylum: Arthropoda
- Clade: Pancrustacea
- Class: Insecta
- Order: Lepidoptera
- Family: Coleophoridae
- Genus: Coleophora
- Species: C. ramitella

Binomial name
- Coleophora ramitella J.-F. Landry & Wright, 1993

Species of moth

Coleophora ramitella is a moth of the family Coleophoridae. It is found in the north-eastern United States.

The wingspan is about 11 mm.
