= Eupithecia penablanca =

Scientific classification
- Domain: Eukaryota
- Kingdom: Animalia
- Phylum: Arthropoda
- Class: Insecta
- Order: Lepidoptera
- Family: Geometridae
- Genus: Eupithecia
- Species: E. penablanca

Binomial name
- Eupithecia penablanca Ferris, 2007

Species of moth

Eupithecia penablanca is a moth in the family Geometridae first described by Clifford D. Ferris in 2007. It is found in Carr Canyon in the US state of Arizona. The habitat consists of oak chaparral forests.

The length of the forewings is 7–8 mm for males and 7–9 mm for females. Adults have been recorded on wing in August.
