= Elachista sylvestris =

Scientific classification
- Kingdom: Animalia
- Phylum: Arthropoda
- Clade: Pancrustacea
- Class: Insecta
- Order: Lepidoptera
- Family: Elachistidae
- Genus: Elachista
- Species: E. sylvestris

Binomial name
- Elachista sylvestris Braun, 1920

Species of moth

Elachista sylvestris is a moth of the family Elachistidae. It is found in the United States, where it has been recorded from Maine, Ohio, Illinois and New Hampshire.

The wingspan is 8–8.5 mm. Adults have been recorded on wing from May to July.

The larvae feed on Poa sylvestris. They mine the stem leaves of their host plant. Mining larvae can be found in April and early May.
