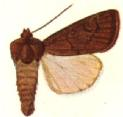

Scientific classification
- Domain: Eukaryota
- Kingdom: Animalia
- Phylum: Arthropoda
- Class: Insecta
- Order: Lepidoptera
- Superfamily: Noctuoidea
- Family: Noctuidae
- Genus: Euxoa
- Species: E. mimallonis

Binomial name
- Euxoa mimallonis Smith, 1890

Synonyms
- Agrotis mimallonis; Agrotis rufipennis; Agrotis caenis; Agrotis muscosa; Euxoa lenola; Porosagrotis mimallonis

= Euxoa mimallonis =

Species of moth

Euxoa mimallonis is a species of moth of the family Noctuidae first described by Smith in 1890. It is found in North America from Nova Scotia west to coastal British Columbia, south in the east to Michigan and Minnesota, in the west to central California and New Mexico.

The wingspan is 38–42 mm. Adults are on wing from July to September. There is one generation per year.

== Subspecies ==
- Euxoa mimallonis gagates (western United States)
- Euxoa mimallonis mimallonis
