= Euxoa satiens =

Scientific classification
- Domain: Eukaryota
- Kingdom: Animalia
- Phylum: Arthropoda
- Class: Insecta
- Order: Lepidoptera
- Superfamily: Noctuoidea
- Family: Noctuidae
- Genus: Euxoa
- Species: E. satiens

Binomial name
- Euxoa satiens (Smith, 1890)

Synonyms
- Agrotis satiens; Porosagrotis satiens

Species of moth

Euxoa satiens is a species of moth of the family Noctuidae. It is found from British Columbia, south to California.

The wingspan is about 34 mm.
