= Coleophora polemoniella =

Scientific classification
- Kingdom: Animalia
- Phylum: Arthropoda
- Class: Insecta
- Order: Lepidoptera
- Family: Coleophoridae
- Genus: Coleophora
- Species: C. polemoniella

Binomial name
- Coleophora polemoniella Braun, 1919

Species of moth

Coleophora polemoniella is a moth of the family Coleophoridae. It is found in the United States, including Ohio.

The larvae feed on the leaves of Polemonium reptans. They create a tubular, bivalved silken case.
