= Elachista praelineata =

Scientific classification
- Domain: Eukaryota
- Kingdom: Animalia
- Phylum: Arthropoda
- Class: Insecta
- Order: Lepidoptera
- Family: Elachistidae
- Genus: Elachista
- Species: E. praelineata

Binomial name
- Elachista praelineata Braun, 1915

Species of moth

Elachista praelineata is a moth of the family Elachistidae. It is found in the United States, where it has been recorded from Ohio. The habitat consists of dry hillside woods.

== Description ==
The wingspan is 6.5 – 7.5 mm.
