= Dichomeris furia =

Scientific classification
- Kingdom: Animalia
- Phylum: Arthropoda
- Clade: Pancrustacea
- Class: Insecta
- Order: Lepidoptera
- Family: Gelechiidae
- Genus: Dichomeris
- Species: D. furia

Binomial name
- Dichomeris furia Hodges, 1986

Species of moth

Dichomeris furia is a moth in the family Gelechiidae. It was described by Ronald W. Hodges in 1986. It is found in North America, where it has been recorded from Illinois, Connecticut, Massachusetts, Georgia, Missouri and New York.
