= Hellinsia auster =

Scientific classification
- Domain: Eukaryota
- Kingdom: Animalia
- Phylum: Arthropoda
- Class: Insecta
- Order: Lepidoptera
- Family: Pterophoridae
- Genus: Hellinsia
- Species: H. auster

Binomial name
- Hellinsia auster (Barnes & Lindsey, 1921)

Synonyms
- Oidaematophorus auster Barnes & Lindsey, 1921

Species of plume moth

Hellinsia auster is a moth of the family Pterophoridae that is found in the U.S. state of Arizona (including the type location, Mohave County). The species was first described by William Barnes and Arthur Ward Lindsey in 1921.

The wingspan is 20–27 millimetres (0.79–1.06 in). The head is blackish brown, white between antennae, which are dark with a white line above, sometimes broken into dots. The thorax is whitish, although the scales are lightly tipped with gray brown, more heavily in a band which crosses the thorax. The abdomen is gray brown with a few white scales. Above it is marked with two white stripes which contain a pair of diverging black streaks on each segment. In the posterior half of the abdomen, the bases of each pair of streaks are connected by a broad dorsal dash in the posterior margin of the preceding segment. There are also some blackish lateral dashes and two pale ventral stripes. The forewings are clothed with mixed white and brownish-gray scales and more or less sprinkled with black. The hindwings and their fringes are brownish gray.

Adults have been recorded in May, August and September.
