= Elachista anagna =

Scientific classification
- Kingdom: Animalia
- Phylum: Arthropoda
- Class: Insecta
- Order: Lepidoptera
- Family: Elachistidae
- Genus: Elachista
- Species: E. anagna

Binomial name
- Elachista anagna Kaila, 1997

Species of moth

Elachista anagna is a moth of the family Elachistidae. It is found in the United States in Arizona and Colorado.

The length of the forewings is 4–4.9 mm.

== Etymology ==
The species name is an artificial combination of letters.
