= Elachista inopina =

Scientific classification
- Domain: Eukaryota
- Kingdom: Animalia
- Phylum: Arthropoda
- Class: Insecta
- Order: Lepidoptera
- Family: Elachistidae
- Genus: Elachista
- Species: E. inopina

Binomial name
- Elachista inopina Kaila, 1997

Species of moth

Elachista inopina is a moth of the family Elachistidae that is found in California.

The length of the forewings is 6.3–6.7 millimetres (0.25–0.26 in).
