= Eupithecia sperryi =

Scientific classification
- Kingdom: Animalia
- Phylum: Arthropoda
- Class: Insecta
- Order: Lepidoptera
- Family: Geometridae
- Genus: Eupithecia
- Species: E. sperryi

Binomial name
- Eupithecia sperryi McDunnough, 1939

Species of moth

Eupithecia sperryi is a moth in the family Geometridae. It is found in the US state of New Mexico and the White Mountain region of Arizona. It is a rare species, and was last spotted in 2018.
