= Coleophora umbratica =

Scientific classification
- Kingdom: Animalia
- Phylum: Arthropoda
- Class: Insecta
- Order: Lepidoptera
- Family: Coleophoridae
- Genus: Coleophora
- Species: C. umbratica

Binomial name
- Coleophora umbratica Braun, 1914

Species of moth

Coleophora umbratica is a moth of the family Coleophoridae. It is found in the United States, including Ohio.

The larvae feed on the leaves of Prunus and Betula species. They create a spatulate leaf case.
