= Hellinsia simplicissimus =

Scientific classification
- Kingdom: Animalia
- Phylum: Arthropoda
- Clade: Pancrustacea
- Class: Insecta
- Order: Lepidoptera
- Family: Pterophoridae
- Genus: Hellinsia
- Species: H. simplicissimus

Binomial name
- Hellinsia simplicissimus (McDunnough, 1938)

Synonyms
- Oidaematophorus simplicissimus McDunnough, 1938

Species of moth

Hellinsia simplicissimus, also known as simplest plume moth, is a moth of the family Pterophoridae. It is known from the U.S. states of California and Texas. The Global Lepidoptera Index places this species in the genus Oidaematophorus.

The wingspan is 12–14 mm (0.47–0.55 in).
