= Coleophora chambersella =

Scientific classification
- Kingdom: Animalia
- Phylum: Arthropoda
- Clade: Pancrustacea
- Class: Insecta
- Order: Lepidoptera
- Family: Coleophoridae
- Genus: Coleophora
- Species: C. chambersella

Binomial name
- Coleophora chambersella Dyar, 1903

Synonyms
- Coleophora atremisicolella Chambers, 1877

Species of moth

Coleophora chambersella is a moth of the family Coleophoridae. It is found in the United States, including Colorado.
