= Coleophora entoloma =

Scientific classification
- Kingdom: Animalia
- Phylum: Arthropoda
- Class: Insecta
- Order: Lepidoptera
- Family: Coleophoridae
- Genus: Coleophora
- Species: C. entoloma

Binomial name
- Coleophora entoloma Busck, 1913

Species of moth

Coleophora entoloma is a moth of the family Coleophoridae. It is found in the United States, including California.
