= Coleophora bipunctella =

Scientific classification
- Kingdom: Animalia
- Phylum: Arthropoda
- Class: Insecta
- Order: Lepidoptera
- Family: Coleophoridae
- Genus: Coleophora
- Species: C. bipunctella

Binomial name
- Coleophora bipunctella Walsingham, 1882

Species of moth

Coleophora bipunctella is a moth of the family Coleophoridae. It is found in Texas, United States.

The wingspan is about 10 mm.
