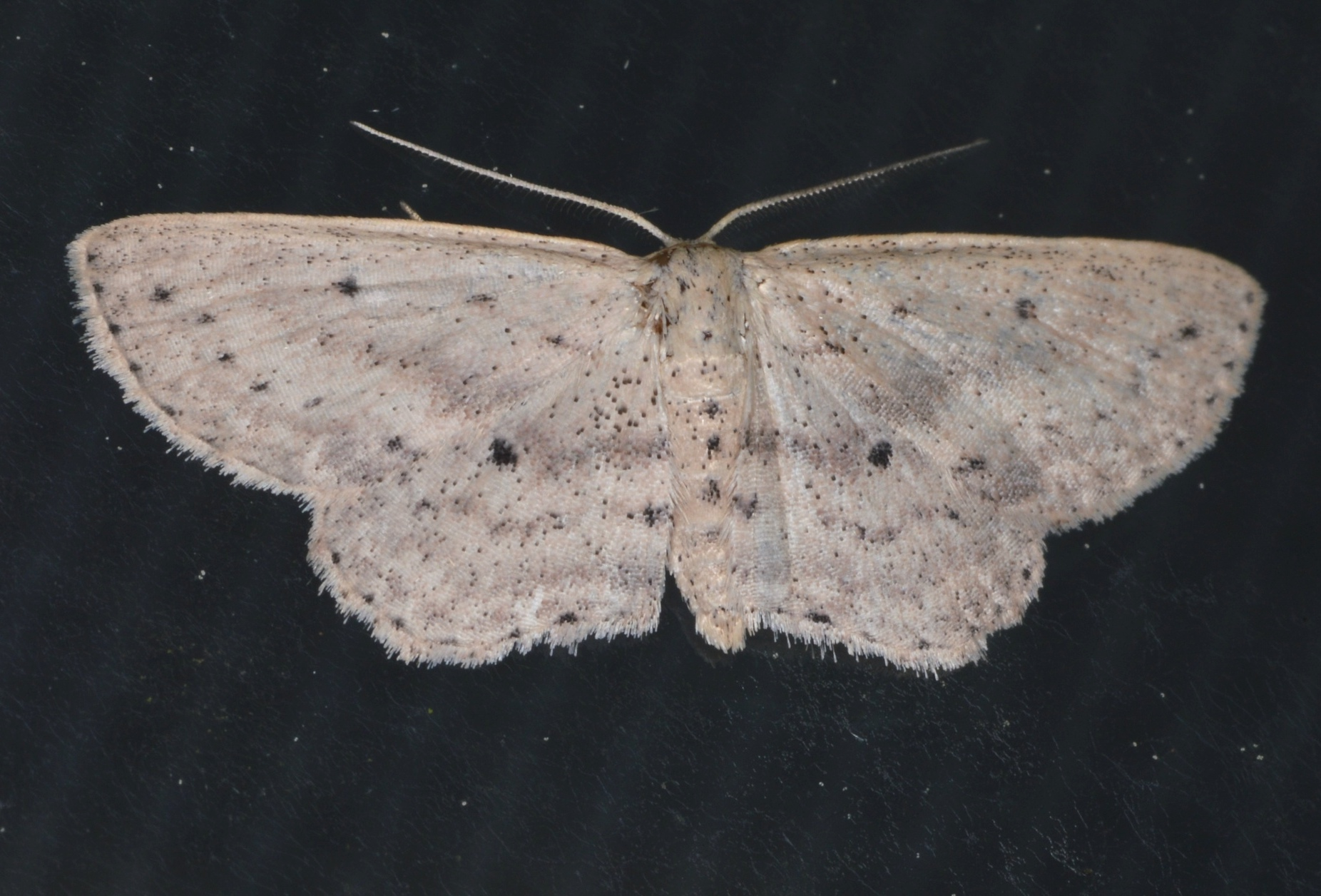

Scientific classification
- Kingdom: Animalia
- Phylum: Arthropoda
- Class: Insecta
- Order: Lepidoptera
- Family: Geometridae
- Genus: Scopula
- Species: S. aemulata

Binomial name
- Scopula aemulata (Hulst, 1896)

Synonyms
- Leptomeris aemulata Hulst, 1896; Acidalia tawneata Cassino, 1931

= Scopula aemulata =

Species of geometer moth in subfamily Sterrhinae

Scopula aemulata, the imitator wave, is a moth of the family Geometridae. It was described by George Duryea Hulst in 1896. It is found in the south-eastern United States (including Florida, Mississippi and South Carolina).

The wingspan is about 15 millimetres (0.59 in).
