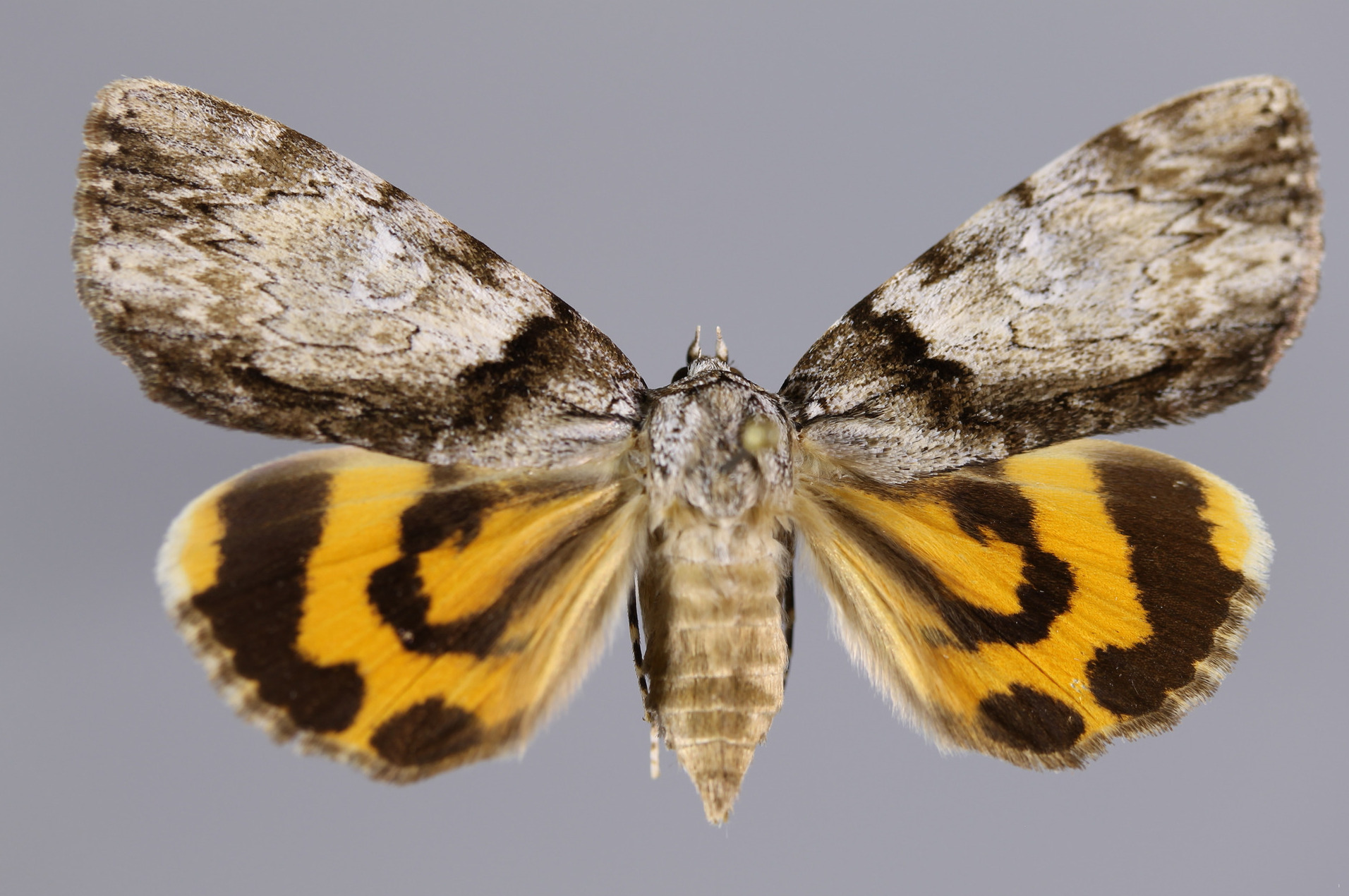

Scientific classification
- Kingdom: Animalia
- Phylum: Arthropoda
- Class: Insecta
- Order: Lepidoptera
- Superfamily: Noctuoidea
- Family: Erebidae
- Genus: Catocala
- Species: C. lincolnana

Binomial name
- Catocala lincolnana Brower, 1976

= Catocala lincolnana =

Species of moth

Catocala lincolnana, the Lincoln underwing, is a moth of the family Erebidae. The species was first described by Auburn Edmund Brower in 1976. It is found in the US from North Carolina south to Florida and west through Arkansas to Texas.

The wingspan is 40–50 mm. Adults are on wing from May to June. There is one generation per year.

The larvae feed on Crataegus.
