= Hellinsia perditus =

Scientific classification
- Domain: Eukaryota
- Kingdom: Animalia
- Phylum: Arthropoda
- Class: Insecta
- Order: Lepidoptera
- Family: Pterophoridae
- Genus: Hellinsia
- Species: H. perditus

Binomial name
- Hellinsia perditus (Barnes & Lindsey, 1921)

Synonyms
- Oidaematophorus perditus Barnes & Lindsey, 1921

Species of plume moth

Hellinsia perditus is a moth of the family Pterophoridae first described by William Barnes and Arthur Ward Lindsey in 1921. It is found in the US states of California and Colorado.

The wingspan is 19–25 mm. The head is dark brown, but yellowish white between the antennae. These are dark with a slender line of whitish above. The thorax is pale yellowish white. The abdomen is similar to the thorax, but with some gray scales and a faint brown dorsal stripe. The costa of the forewings is yellowish, sometimes obscured toward the base. Just inside of this line, the wing is brownish gray, becoming gradually paler toward the inner margin with an increasing admixture of whitish scales. The veins are sometimes darker in the second lobe. The fringes are brownish gray with paler bases but yellowish on the costa. The hindwings and their fringes are brownish gray.
