= Elachista scobifera =

Scientific classification
- Domain: Eukaryota
- Kingdom: Animalia
- Phylum: Arthropoda
- Class: Insecta
- Order: Lepidoptera
- Family: Elachistidae
- Genus: Elachista
- Species: E. scobifera

Binomial name
- Elachista scobifera Kaila, 1997

Species of moth

Elachista scobifera is a moth of the family Elachistidae that is found in Arizona.

The length of the forewings is 4–6.3 millimetres (0.16–0.25 in).
