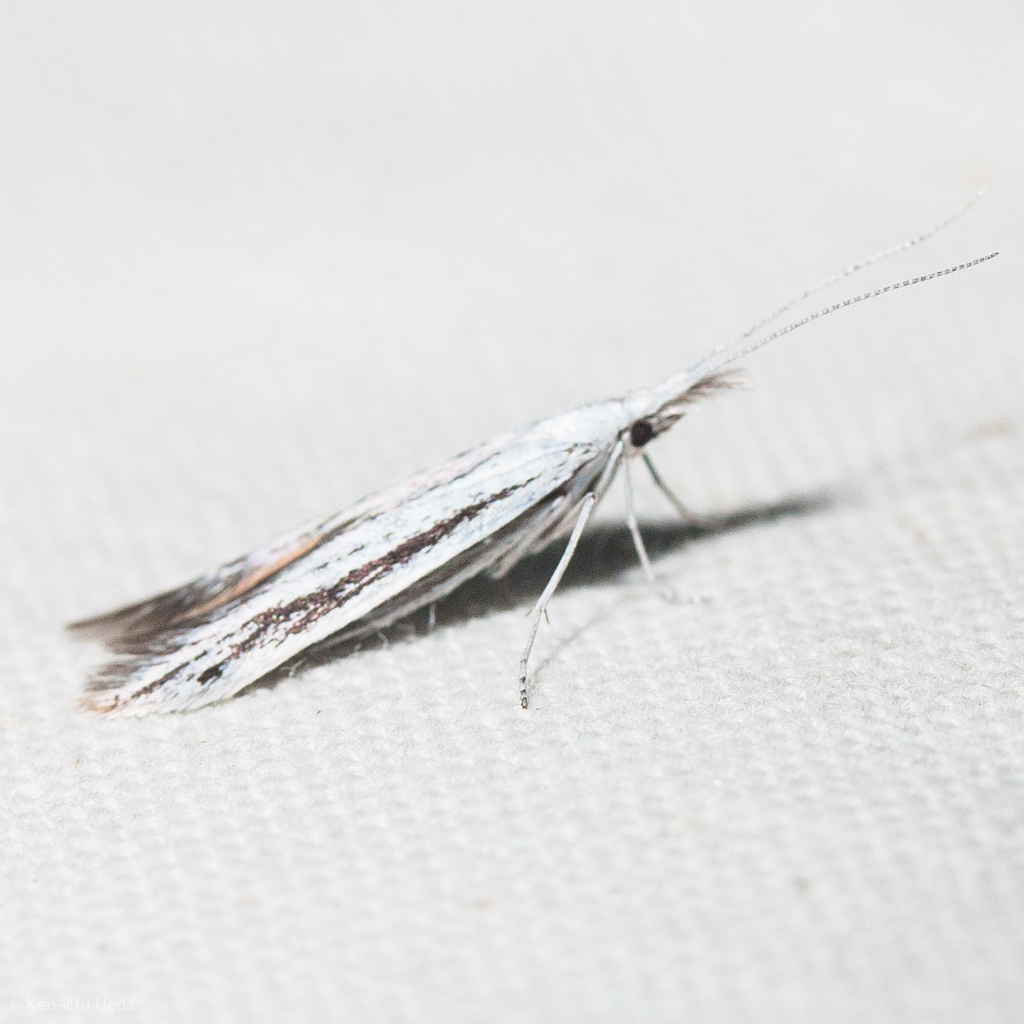

Scientific classification
- Kingdom: Animalia
- Phylum: Arthropoda
- Class: Insecta
- Order: Lepidoptera
- Family: Coleophoridae
- Genus: Coleophora
- Species: C. discostriata

Binomial name
- Coleophora discostriata Walsingham, 1882

= Coleophora discostriata =

Species of moth

Coleophora discostriata is a moth of the family Coleophoridae. It is found in the United States, including California.

The wingspan is about 16 mm. Adults have white forewings with a conspicuous brownish fuscous streak. Adults have been recorded in July and August.

The larvae feed on the leaves of Quercus species. They create a pistol case with a rounded excrescence on the underside. The apex of the case is rather small, the mouth oblique and the apical portion is rather blackish and decidedly darker than the rest of the case, which is grayish ocherous.
