= Coleophora portulacae =

Scientific classification
- Kingdom: Animalia
- Phylum: Arthropoda
- Class: Insecta
- Order: Lepidoptera
- Family: Coleophoridae
- Genus: Coleophora
- Species: C. portulacae

Binomial name
- Coleophora portulacae Cockerell, 1898

Species of moth

Coleophora portulacae is a moth of the family Coleophoridae. It is found in the United States, including New Mexico.

The larvae feed on the leaves of Portulaca species. They create a trivalved, tubular silken case.
