= Eupithecia macrocarpata =

Scientific classification
- Domain: Eukaryota
- Kingdom: Animalia
- Phylum: Arthropoda
- Class: Insecta
- Order: Lepidoptera
- Family: Geometridae
- Genus: Eupithecia
- Species: E. macrocarpata

Binomial name
- Eupithecia macrocarpata McDunnough, 1944

Species of moth

Eupithecia macrocarpata is a moth in the family Geometridae first described by James Halliday McDunnough in 1944. It is found in the US state of California.

The wingspan is about 23 mm. The forewings are brownish olivaceous.

The larvae feed on Cupressus macrocarpata and Cupressus forbesii.
