= Hellinsia phoebus =

Scientific classification
- Domain: Eukaryota
- Kingdom: Animalia
- Phylum: Arthropoda
- Class: Insecta
- Order: Lepidoptera
- Family: Pterophoridae
- Genus: Hellinsia
- Species: H. phoebus

Binomial name
- Hellinsia phoebus (Barnes & Lindsey, 1921)

Synonyms
- Oidaematophorus phoebus Barnes & Lindsey, 1921

Species of plume moth

Hellinsia phoebus is a moth of the family Pterophoridae first described by William Barnes and Arthur Ward Lindsey in 1921. It is found in the US states of California and Arizona.

The wingspan is 21–23 mm. The head is brown with a whitish band between the antennae. The antennae are faintly brown dotted above. The thorax is whitish in front, becoming tawny to brownish behind. The forewings are whitish to light tawny brown. The costa is whitish toward base, sprinkled with blackish scales. The cleft is preceded by a faint dark dot. There usually are some scattered black scales on the entire wing, although they are less numerous on the disk and tend to form streaks in the lobes and near the inner margin. The fringes are pale on the costa, elsewhere brownish gray to brownish black. The hindwings are brownish gray with concolorous or slightly darker fringes.

Adults have been recorded in March to July.
