= Coleophora demissella =

Scientific classification
- Kingdom: Animalia
- Phylum: Arthropoda
- Class: Insecta
- Order: Lepidoptera
- Family: Coleophoridae
- Genus: Coleophora
- Species: C. demissella

Binomial name
- Coleophora demissella Braun, 1914

Synonyms
- Coleophora pruniella Walsingham, 1907

Species of moth

Coleophora demissella is a moth of the family Coleophoridae. It is found in the eastern United States.

The larvae feed on the leaves of Prunus demissa.
