= Coleophora bidens =

Scientific classification
- Kingdom: Animalia
- Phylum: Arthropoda
- Class: Insecta
- Order: Lepidoptera
- Family: Coleophoridae
- Genus: Coleophora
- Species: C. bidens

Binomial name
- Coleophora bidens Braun, 1940

Species of moth

Coleophora bidens is a moth of the family Coleophoridae. It is found in the United States, including Ohio.

The larvae feed on the seeds of Aster umbellatus.
