= Coleophora indefinitella =

Scientific classification
- Kingdom: Animalia
- Phylum: Arthropoda
- Clade: Pancrustacea
- Class: Insecta
- Order: Lepidoptera
- Family: Coleophoridae
- Genus: Coleophora
- Species: C. indefinitella

Binomial name
- Coleophora indefinitella Oudejans, 1971

Synonyms
- Coleophora zelleriella Chambers, 1874 (Junior primary homonym of Coleophora zelleriella Heinemann, 1854)

Species of moth

Coleophora indefinitella is a moth of the family Coleophoridae. It is found in the United States, including Kentucky.
