= Coleophora apicialbella =

Scientific classification
- Kingdom: Animalia
- Phylum: Arthropoda
- Class: Insecta
- Order: Lepidoptera
- Family: Coleophoridae
- Genus: Coleophora
- Species: C. apicialbella

Binomial name
- Coleophora apicialbella Braun, 1920

Species of moth

Coleophora apicialbella is a moth of the family Coleophoridae. It is found in the United States, including Ohio, Cincinnati and Indiana.

The larvae feed on the leaves of Silene virginica. They create a tubular, trivalved silken case.
