= Euxoa aberrans =

Scientific classification
- Domain: Eukaryota
- Kingdom: Animalia
- Phylum: Arthropoda
- Class: Insecta
- Order: Lepidoptera
- Superfamily: Noctuoidea
- Family: Noctuidae
- Genus: Euxoa
- Species: E. aberrans

Binomial name
- Euxoa aberrans McDunnough, 1932

Species of moth

Euxoa aberrans is a moth of the family Noctuidae. It is found from British Columbia, Alberta, Saskatchewan and Manitoba in Canada. In the United States it has been recorded from Washington and Montana.
