= Elachista staintonella =

Scientific classification
- Kingdom: Animalia
- Phylum: Arthropoda
- Clade: Pancrustacea
- Class: Insecta
- Order: Lepidoptera
- Family: Elachistidae
- Genus: Elachista
- Species: E. staintonella

Binomial name
- Elachista staintonella Chambers, 1878

Species of moth

Elachista staintonella is a moth of the family Elachistidae. It is found in the United States, where it has been recorded from Texas.
