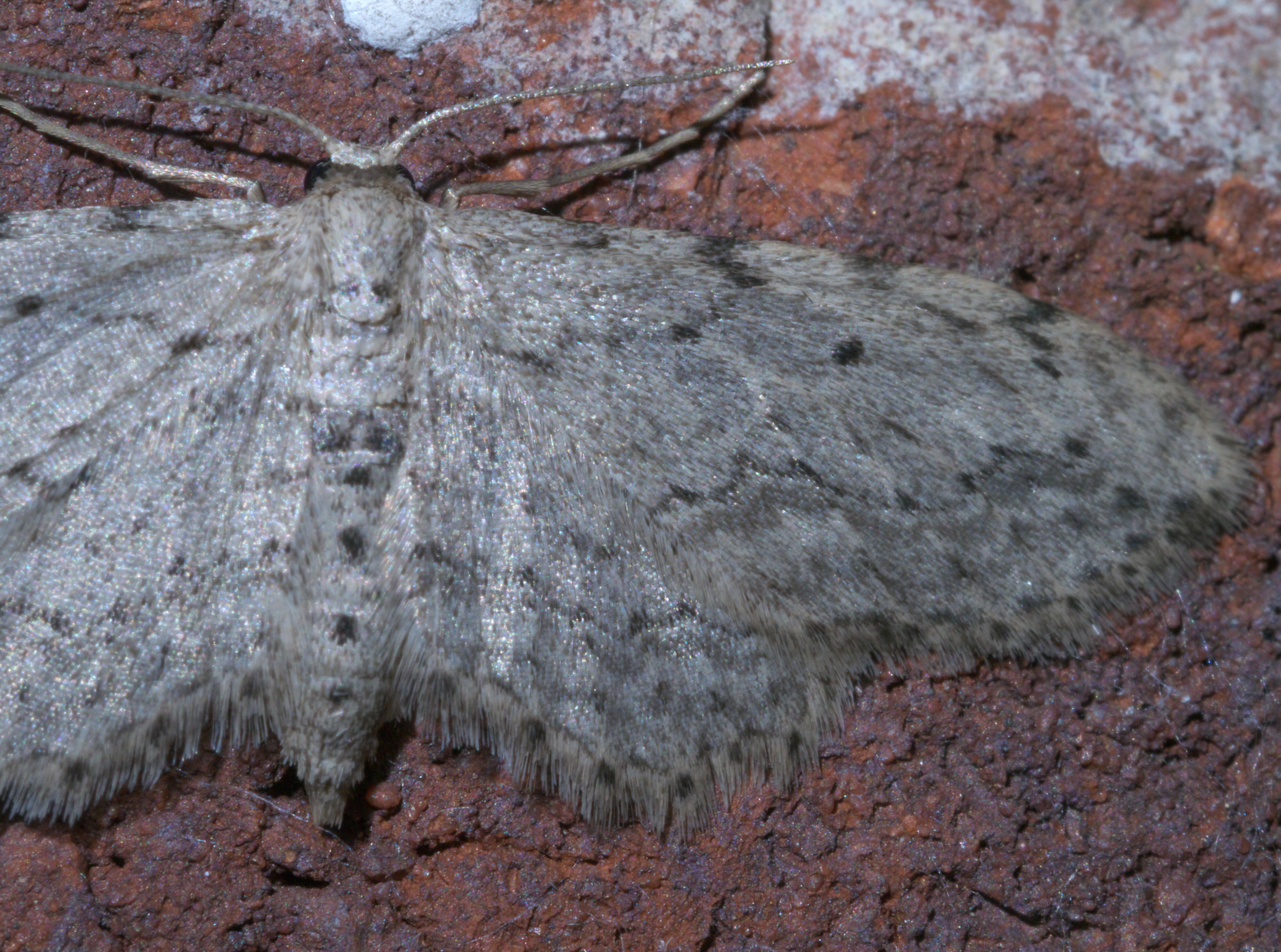

Scientific classification
- Domain: Eukaryota
- Kingdom: Animalia
- Phylum: Arthropoda
- Class: Insecta
- Order: Lepidoptera
- Family: Geometridae
- Genus: Scopula
- Species: S. plantagenaria

Binomial name
- Scopula plantagenaria (Hulst, 1887)

Synonyms
- Ephyra plantagenaria Hulst, 1887; Ptychopoda canthema Schaus, 1901; Scopula hieronyma Prout, 1922

= Scopula plantagenaria =

Species of geometer moth in subfamily Sterrhinae

Scopula plantagenaria is a moth of the family Geometridae. It is found from California to Utah east to Florida and Missouri.

The wingspan is about 21 mm.
