= Hellinsia varius =

Scientific classification
- Domain: Eukaryota
- Kingdom: Animalia
- Phylum: Arthropoda
- Class: Insecta
- Order: Lepidoptera
- Family: Pterophoridae
- Genus: Hellinsia
- Species: H. varius

Binomial name
- Hellinsia varius (Barnes & Lindsey, 1921)

Synonyms
- Oidaematophorus varius Barnes & Lindsey, 1921

Species of moth

Hellinsia varius is a moth of the family Pterophoridae that is found in the US states of California and Arizona. The species was first described by William Barnes and Arthur Ward Lindsey in 1921.

The wingspan is 19–23 millimetres (0.75–0.91 in). The head is whitish, faintly touched with brown above. The antennae are white and usually vaguely brown dotted above. The thorax and abdomen are white. The forewings are soft, pale, brownish gray with a variably heavy white overscaling which is slightly thinner on the costa and often appears to be confined to the spaces between the veins on the lobes so that the veins appear to be dark lined. The fringes and hindwings are concolorous but without white scales.
