= Elachista sincera =

Scientific classification
- Domain: Eukaryota
- Kingdom: Animalia
- Phylum: Arthropoda
- Class: Insecta
- Order: Lepidoptera
- Family: Elachistidae
- Genus: Elachista
- Species: E. sincera

Binomial name
- Elachista sincera Braun, 1925

Species of moth

Elachista sincera is a moth of the family Elachistidae. It is found in Utah, United States.
