= Eupithecia bivittata =

Scientific classification
- Domain: Eukaryota
- Kingdom: Animalia
- Phylum: Arthropoda
- Class: Insecta
- Order: Lepidoptera
- Family: Geometridae
- Genus: Eupithecia
- Species: E. bivittata

Binomial name
- Eupithecia bivittata (Hulst, 1896)

Synonyms
- Tephroclystia bivittata Hulst, 1896

Species of moth

Eupithecia bivittata is a moth in the family Geometridae first described by George Duryea Hulst in 1896. It is found in coastal central California, United States.

The wingspan is about 19–20 mm.
