= Coleophora annulicola =

Scientific classification
- Kingdom: Animalia
- Phylum: Arthropoda
- Class: Insecta
- Order: Lepidoptera
- Family: Coleophoridae
- Genus: Coleophora
- Species: C. annulicola

Binomial name
- Coleophora annulicola Braun, 1925

Species of moth

Coleophora annulicola is a moth of the family Coleophoridae. It is found in the United States, including Montana and Utah.

The larvae feed on the leaves of Aster and Solidago species. They create an annulate case.
