= Eupithecia chiricahuata =

Scientific classification
- Domain: Eukaryota
- Kingdom: Animalia
- Phylum: Arthropoda
- Class: Insecta
- Order: Lepidoptera
- Family: Geometridae
- Genus: Eupithecia
- Species: E. chiricahuata

Binomial name
- Eupithecia chiricahuata McDunnough, 1944

Species of moth

Eupithecia chiricahuata is a moth in the family Geometridae. It is found in Arizona (Chiricahua Mountains).

The wingspan is about 21 mm.
