= Catocala grotiana =

Grote's underwing

Scientific classification
- Kingdom: Animalia
- Phylum: Arthropoda
- Clade: Pancrustacea
- Class: Insecta
- Order: Lepidoptera
- Superfamily: Noctuoidea
- Family: Erebidae
- Genus: Catocala
- Species: C. grotiana

Binomial name
- Catocala grotiana Bailey, 1879

Synonyms
- Catocala georgeana Beutenmueller, 1918; Catocala groteiana

Species of moth

Catocala grotiana, or Grote's underwing, is a moth of the family Erebidae. The species was first described by James S. Bailey in 1879. It is found in the US from Arizona, north through Utah into Colorado. It has also been spotted in Washington and in the western US north and east of California.

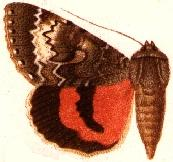
Illustration

The wingspan is 70–80 mm. Adults are on wing from August to September depending on the location. There is probably one generation per year.

The larvae feed on Populus and Salix species.

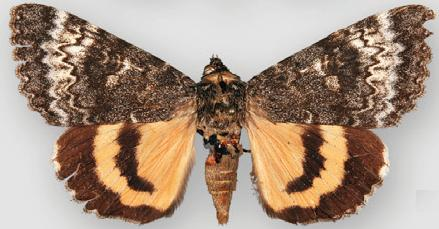
Catocala_grotiana
