= Hellinsia costatus =

Scientific classification
- Domain: Eukaryota
- Kingdom: Animalia
- Phylum: Arthropoda
- Class: Insecta
- Order: Lepidoptera
- Family: Pterophoridae
- Genus: Hellinsia
- Species: H. costatus

Binomial name
- Hellinsia costatus (Barnes & Lindsey, 1921)

Synonyms
- Oidaematophorus costatus Barnes & Lindsey, 1921

Species of plume moth

Hellinsia costatus is a moth of the family Pterophoridae first described by William Barnes and Arthur Ward Lindsey in 1921. It is found in North America, including California, Utah and British Columbia.

The wingspan is 30–33 mm. The head is pale grayish yellow, but paler between the antennae. The antennae and palpi are more whitish, the latter with a dark streak on the outside of the third joint and tip of the second. The thorax and abdomen are pale grayish yellow, the latter with a faint brown dorsal line. The forewings are yellowish white, shaded with gray and becoming darker and more brownish in the costal region. The fringes are mostly concolorous. The hindwings and their fringes are brownish gray.
