= Elachista angularis =

Scientific classification
- Domain: Eukaryota
- Kingdom: Animalia
- Phylum: Arthropoda
- Class: Insecta
- Order: Lepidoptera
- Family: Elachistidae
- Genus: Elachista
- Species: E. angularis

Binomial name
- Elachista angularis (Braun, 1918)

Synonyms
- Dicranoctetes angularis Braun, 1918

Species of moth

Elachista angularis is a moth of the family Elachistidae. It is found in the United States, where it has been recorded from Maryland, Mississippi and Tennessee.

The wingspan is about 7 mm. The forewings are gray, shading to brownish-black outwardly. There is an angulated white fascia beyond the middle. The hindwings are gray. Adults have been recorded on wing in April and from June to July.
