= Coleophora irroratella =

Scientific classification
- Kingdom: Animalia
- Phylum: Arthropoda
- Class: Insecta
- Order: Lepidoptera
- Family: Coleophoridae
- Genus: Coleophora
- Species: C. irroratella

Binomial name
- Coleophora irroratella Walsingham, 1882

Species of moth

Coleophora irroratella is a moth of the family Coleophoridae. It is found in the United States, including California.

The larvae feed on the leaves of Crataegus species. They create a tubular leaf case.
