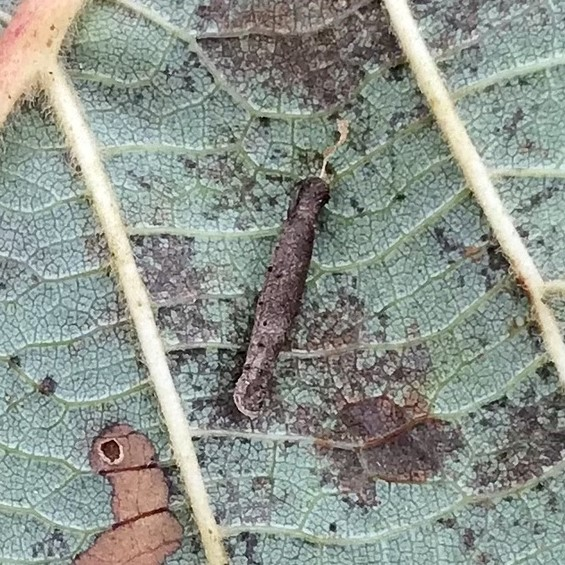
- Larva

Scientific classification
- Kingdom: Animalia
- Phylum: Arthropoda
- Clade: Pancrustacea
- Class: Insecta
- Order: Lepidoptera
- Family: Coleophoridae
- Genus: Coleophora
- Species: C. alniella

Binomial name
- Coleophora alniella Heinrich, 1914

= Coleophora alniella =

Species of moth

Coleophora alniella is a species of moth that belongs to the family Coleophoridae. It is found in the United States, including Maryland and Virginia.

The larvae feed on the leaves of Alnus species. They create a spatulate leaf case.
