= Hellinsia caudelli =

Scientific classification
- Kingdom: Animalia
- Phylum: Arthropoda
- Class: Insecta
- Order: Lepidoptera
- Family: Pterophoridae
- Genus: Hellinsia
- Species: H. caudelli

Binomial name
- Hellinsia caudelli (Dyar, 1903)

Synonyms
- Pterophorus caudelli Dyar, 1903; Oidaematophorus caudelli

Species of plume moth

Hellinsia caudelli is a moth of the family Pterophoridae that is found in California and Arizona.

The wingspan is 20–27 millimetres (0.79–1.06 in). The head is light brown, but yellowish white between the antennae. The antennae are whitish. The legs are also whitish, but the first two pairs are shaded with fuscous inside. The thorax and abdomen are yellowish white, the latter with a few faint brown stripes. The forewings are yellowish white with a light brown or grey brown subcostal shade. The fringes are concolorous. The hindwings and their fringes are pale brownish grey.
