= Eupithecia suspiciosata =

Scientific classification
- Domain: Eukaryota
- Kingdom: Animalia
- Phylum: Arthropoda
- Class: Insecta
- Order: Lepidoptera
- Family: Geometridae
- Genus: Eupithecia
- Species: E. suspiciosata

Binomial name
- Eupithecia suspiciosata Dietze, 1875

Species of moth

Eupithecia suspiciosata is a moth in the family Geometridae. It was described by Karl Dietze from the US state of California.
