= Hellinsia venapunctus =

Scientific classification
- Kingdom: Animalia
- Phylum: Arthropoda
- Class: Insecta
- Order: Lepidoptera
- Family: Pterophoridae
- Genus: Hellinsia
- Species: H. venapunctus

Binomial name
- Hellinsia venapunctus (Barnes & Lindsey, 1921)

Synonyms
- Oidaematophorus venapunctus Barnes & Lindsey, 1921

Species of moth

Hellinsia venapunctus is a moth of the family Pterophoridae first described by William Barnes and Arthur Ward Lindsey in 1921. It is found primarily in the US state of Texas.

== Description ==
The wingspan of Hellinsia venapunctus is 15–18 millimetres (0.59–0.71 in). The color of the head is whitish ocherous between the antennae and elsewhere it is light brown. The antennae and palpi are pale brownish ocherous, almost white. The thorax and legs are of the same shade of pale brownish ocherous, the fore and middle legs are tinged with brown inside. The abdomen is similar both above and below, with a fine, brown, middorsal line. The forewings are concolorous with the thorax, but darker toward the costa, especially in the first lobe, though this shade is scarcely evident in some specimens. Just before and below the base of the cleft is a small blackish-brown spot. In the outer margin of the second lobe there are four short, dark dashes on the tips of the veins. A similar but heavier spot occurs on the inner margin of the first lobe a short distance before its apex. The fringes are concolorous, slightly darker toward the apex of the wing and with their bases slightly paler. The hindwings are somewhat paler than the forewings and with a more grayish tinge. The fringes are concolorous with slightly paler bases.
