= Coleophora argentella =

Scientific classification
- Kingdom: Animalia
- Phylum: Arthropoda
- Clade: Pancrustacea
- Class: Insecta
- Order: Lepidoptera
- Family: Coleophoridae
- Genus: Coleophora
- Species: C. argentella

Binomial name
- Coleophora argentella Chambers, 1875

Synonyms
- Coleophora argentialbella Chambers, 1875

Species of moth

Coleophora argentella is a moth of the family Coleophoridae. It is found in the United States, including Colorado.
