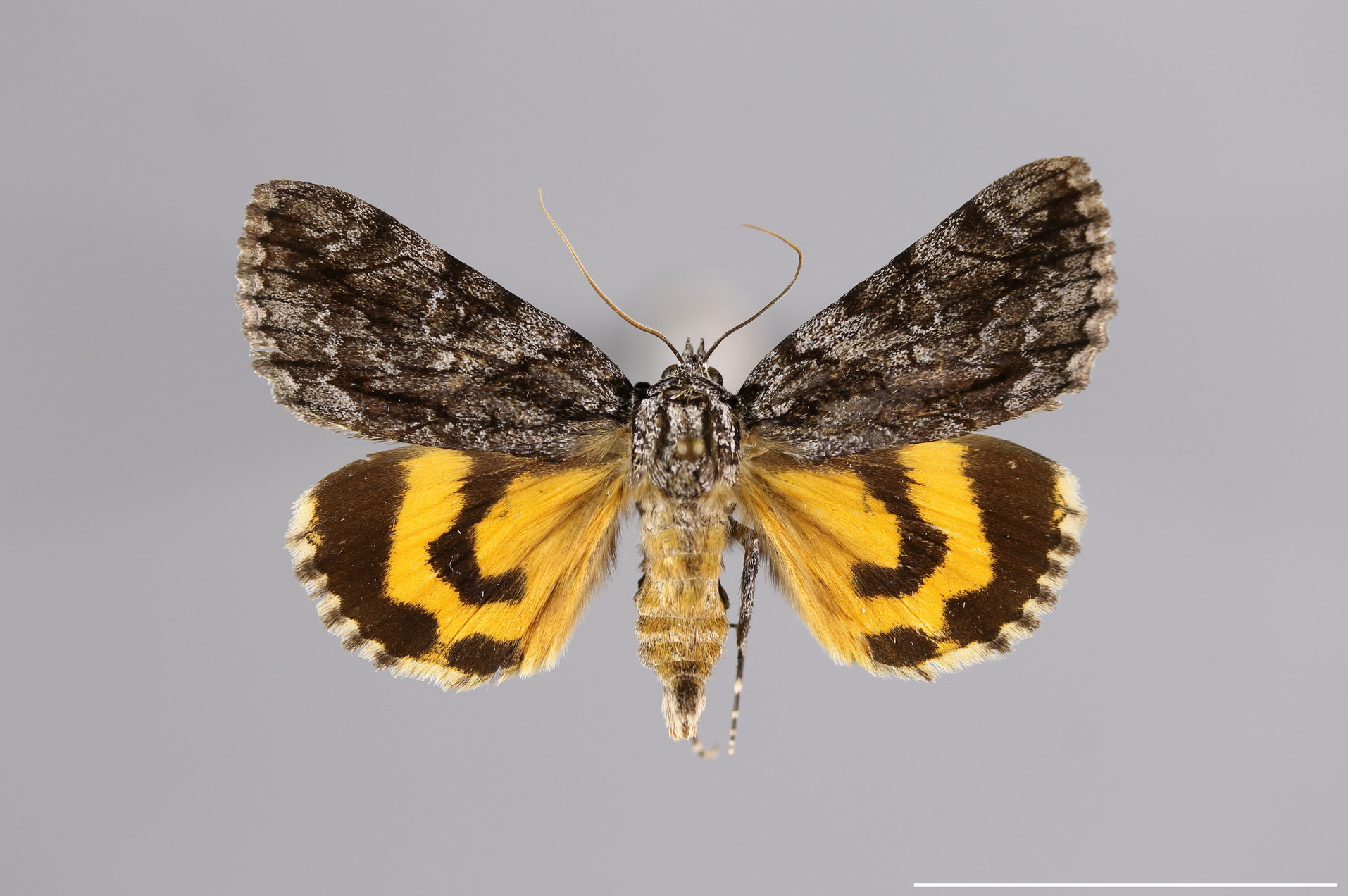

Scientific classification
- Kingdom: Animalia
- Phylum: Arthropoda
- Class: Insecta
- Order: Lepidoptera
- Superfamily: Noctuoidea
- Family: Erebidae
- Genus: Catocala
- Species: C. grisatra

Binomial name
- Catocala grisatra Brower, 1936

= Catocala grisatra =

Grisatra underwing

Species of moth

Catocala grisatra, the grisatra underwing, is a moth of the family Erebidae. It is found from the coastal plain in Bladen County, North Carolina, south through Georgia to Florida.

The wingspan is 48–55 mm. Adults are on wing from May to June. There is one generation per year.

The larvae feed on Crataegus.
