= Coleophora sparsipuncta =

Scientific classification
- Kingdom: Animalia
- Phylum: Arthropoda
- Class: Insecta
- Order: Lepidoptera
- Family: Coleophoridae
- Genus: Coleophora
- Species: C. sparsipuncta

Binomial name
- Coleophora sparsipuncta Heinrich, 1929

Species of moth

Coleophora sparsipuncta is a moth of the family Coleophoridae. It is found in the United States, including Indiana.

The larvae feed on the leaves of Aster species. They create a trivalved, tubular silken case.
