= Hellinsia elliottii =

Scientific classification
- Domain: Eukaryota
- Kingdom: Animalia
- Phylum: Arthropoda
- Class: Insecta
- Order: Lepidoptera
- Family: Pterophoridae
- Genus: Hellinsia
- Species: H. elliottii

Binomial name
- Hellinsia elliottii (Fernald, 1893)

Synonyms
- Alucita elliottii Fernald, 1893; Oidaematophora elliottii

Species of plume moth

Hellinsia elliottii is a moth of the family Pterophoridae. It is found in North America, including Mississippi, New York, Iowa, Quebec, Alberta and Ontario.

The wingspan is 21–26 mm. The head is very pale fuscous and the thorax and abdomen are whitish fuscous. The legs are white. The forewings are white, tinged with ocher yellow near the base and on the apical third of the costa. There is a very oblique streak of brown scales on the costa near the apex and a dark-brown spot before the fissure. A streak of irregular brown scales extends from the base of the wing to the fissure. The fringes are white. The hindwings are pure white, with a few ocher-yellow scales scattered over the surface in some specimens.

The larvae are light green with long, white, shiny hairs from the tubercles. Except on the prothorax, there is a distinct creamy dorsal line broken in the centre of each segment by a small, round dot of the ground color. Pupation takes place in a green pupa with pale ochreous markings.
