= Eupithecia bolterii =

Scientific classification
- Domain: Eukaryota
- Kingdom: Animalia
- Phylum: Arthropoda
- Class: Insecta
- Order: Lepidoptera
- Family: Geometridae
- Genus: Eupithecia
- Species: E. bolterii

Binomial name
- Eupithecia bolterii (Hulst, 1900)

Synonyms
- Tephroclystia bolterii Hulst, 1900

Species of moth

Eupithecia bolterii is a moth in the family Geometridae first described by George Duryea Hulst in 1900. It is found in the US states of Arizona and Texas.

The wingspan is about 18–20 mm. The ground color of the forewings is gray. They are crossed by numerous fine lines. Adults are on wing in early spring.
