= Eupithecia edna =

Scientific classification
- Kingdom: Animalia
- Phylum: Arthropoda
- Clade: Pancrustacea
- Class: Insecta
- Order: Lepidoptera
- Family: Geometridae
- Genus: Eupithecia
- Species: E. edna

Binomial name
- Eupithecia edna (Hulst, 1896)

Synonyms
- Tephroclystia edna Hulst, 1896

Species of moth

Eupithecia edna is a moth in the family Geometridae first described by George Duryea Hulst in 1896. It is found in the southwestern United States, including Arizona, California, Colorado, Nevada and New Mexico.

The wingspan is about 17–22 mm. Adults have been recorded on wing from May to September.
