= Coleophora arizoniella =

Scientific classification
- Kingdom: Animalia
- Phylum: Arthropoda
- Class: Insecta
- Order: Lepidoptera
- Family: Coleophoridae
- Genus: Coleophora
- Species: C. arizoniella

Binomial name
- Coleophora arizoniella (Kearfott, 1907)

Synonyms
- Holcocera arizoniella Kearfott, 1907; Scythris arizoniella

Species of moth

Coleophora arizoniella is a moth of the family Coleophoridae. It is found in the United States, including Arizona.

The wingspan is about 12 mm.
