= Coleophora crinita =

Scientific classification
- Kingdom: Animalia
- Phylum: Arthropoda
- Class: Insecta
- Order: Lepidoptera
- Family: Coleophoridae
- Genus: Coleophora
- Species: C. crinita

Binomial name
- Coleophora crinita Braun, 1921

Species of moth

Coleophora crinita is a moth of the family Coleophoridae. It is found in the United States, including Utah.
