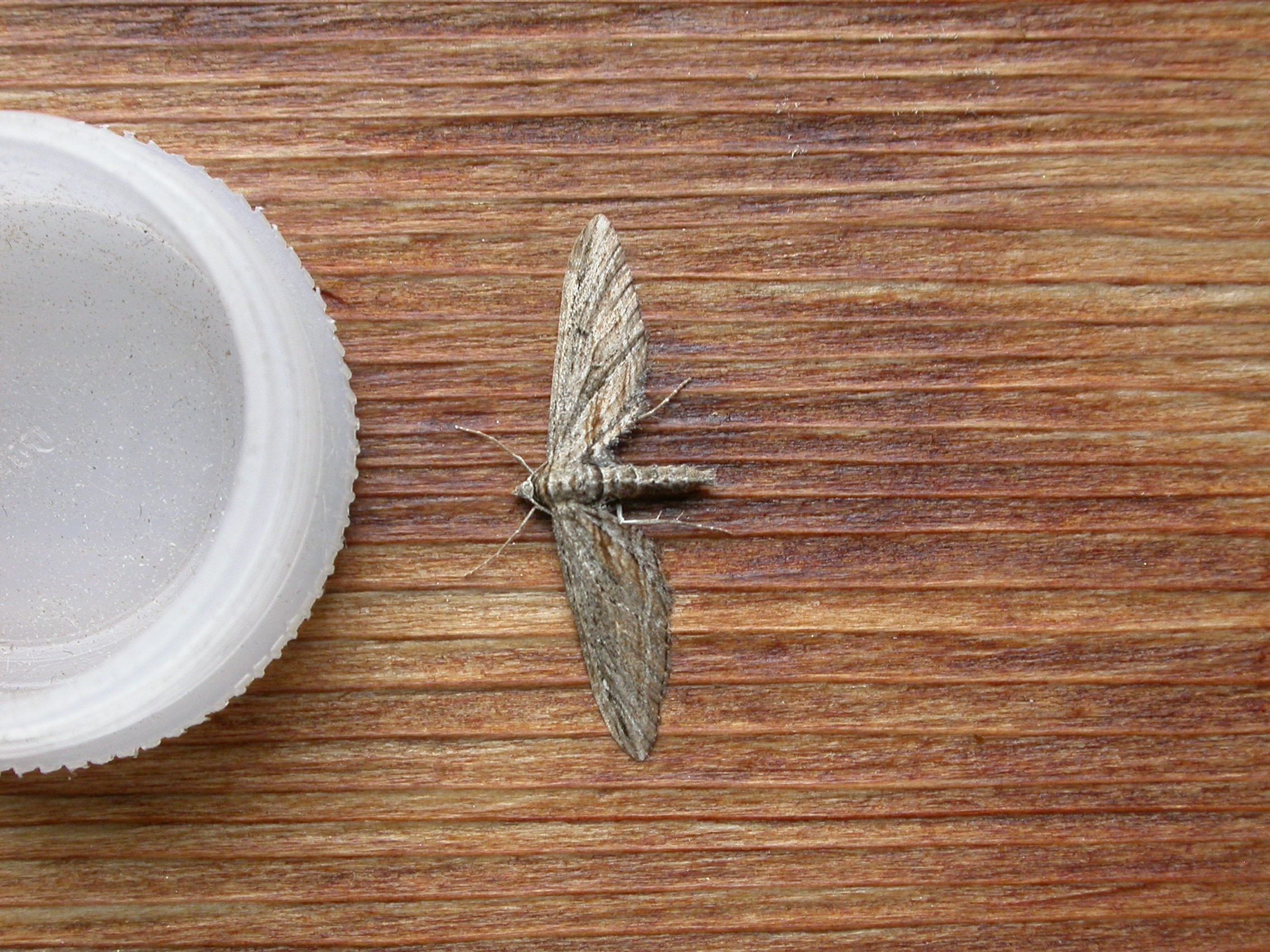

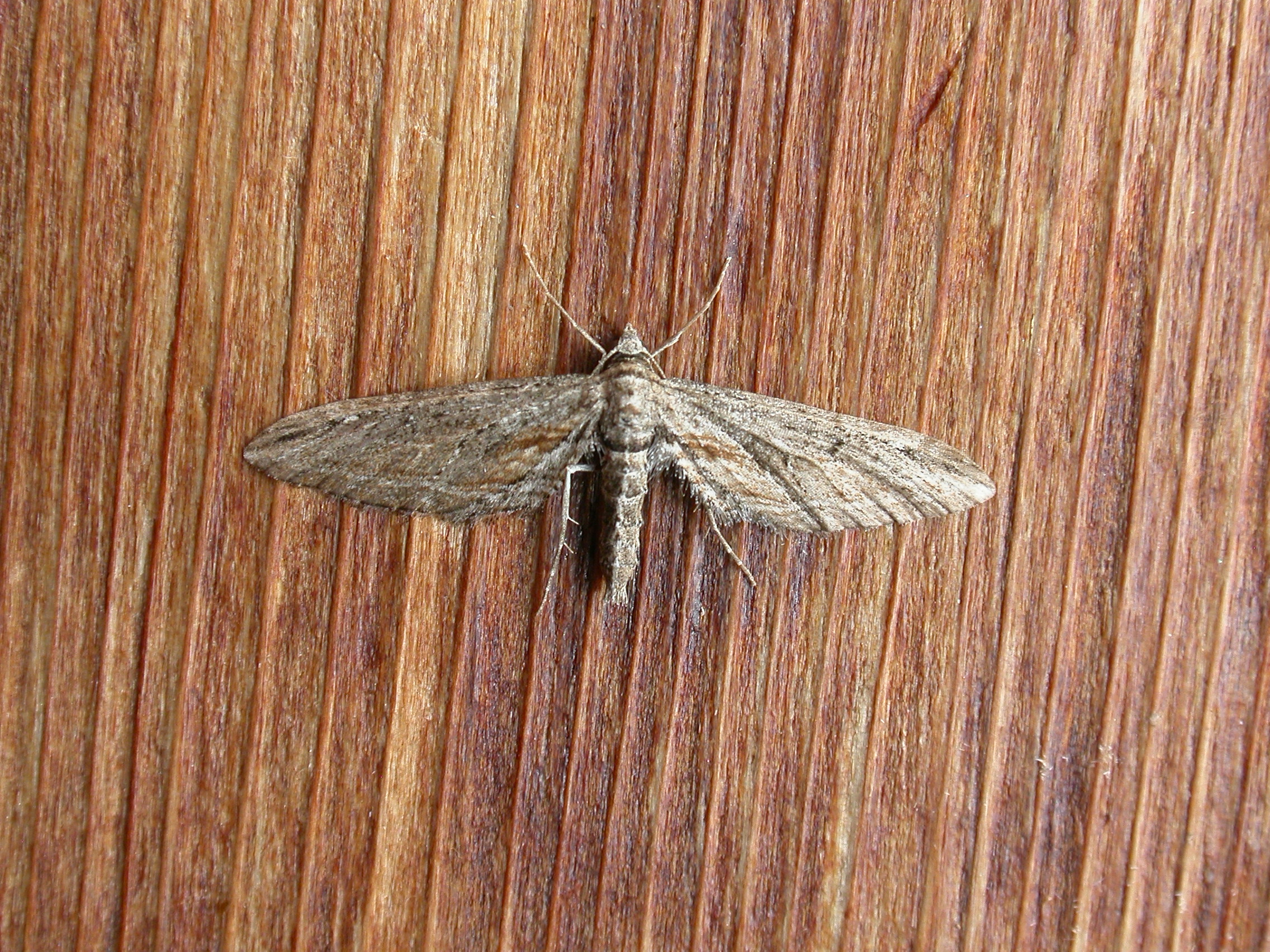

Scientific classification
- Domain: Eukaryota
- Kingdom: Animalia
- Phylum: Arthropoda
- Class: Insecta
- Order: Lepidoptera
- Family: Geometridae
- Genus: Eupithecia
- Species: E. acutipennis

Binomial name
- Eupithecia acutipennis (Hulst, 1898)

Synonyms
- Tephroclystia acutipennis Hulst, 1898

= Eupithecia acutipennis =

Geometer moth species

Eupithecia acutipennis is a moth of the family Geometridae first described by George Duryea Hulst in 1898. It is found in the US state of California.

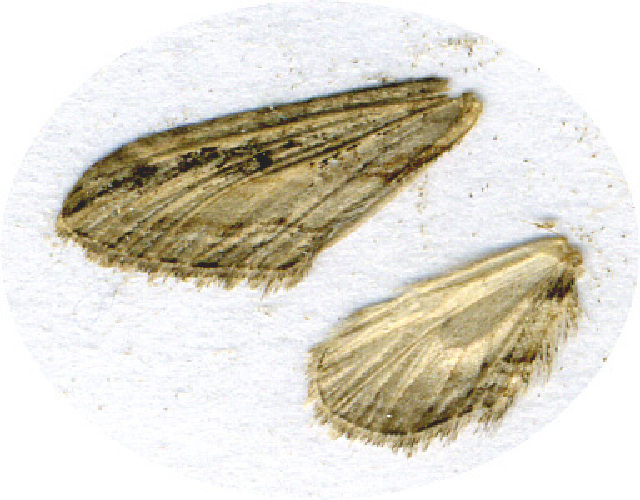
Wings

The wingspan is about 22 mm. The forewings are light smoky ocherous. Adults have been recorded on wing from October to April.
