= Eupithecia cupressata =

Scientific classification
- Domain: Eukaryota
- Kingdom: Animalia
- Phylum: Arthropoda
- Class: Insecta
- Order: Lepidoptera
- Family: Geometridae
- Genus: Eupithecia
- Species: E. cupressata

Binomial name
- Eupithecia cupressata Pearsall, 1910

Species of moth

Eupithecia cupressata is a moth in the family Geometridae. It is found in the Alameda, Mendocino, and Monterey counties in central coastal California.

The length of the forewings is 12–14 mm for both males and females. Adults are on wing from March to December.

Larvae have been reared on Cupressus macrocarpa and possibly also feed on Sequoia sempervirens.
