= Coleophora biminimmaculella =

Scientific classification
- Kingdom: Animalia
- Phylum: Arthropoda
- Clade: Pancrustacea
- Class: Insecta
- Order: Lepidoptera
- Family: Coleophoridae
- Genus: Coleophora
- Species: C. biminimmaculella

Binomial name
- Coleophora biminimmaculella Chambers, 1878

Species of moth

Coleophora biminimmaculella is a moth of the family Coleophoridae. It is found in the United States, including Texas.
