= Elachista argillacea =

Scientific classification
- Kingdom: Animalia
- Phylum: Arthropoda
- Class: Insecta
- Order: Lepidoptera
- Family: Elachistidae
- Genus: Elachista
- Species: E. argillacea

Binomial name
- Elachista argillacea Kaila, 1997

Species of moth

Elachista argillacea is a moth of the family Elachistidae. It is found in California, United States.

The length of the forewings is 3.7–4.8 mm.

== Etymology ==
The species name is derived from Latin argilla (meaning white clay).
