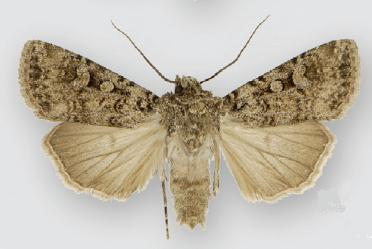
- Euxoa simulata (male)

Scientific classification
- Domain: Eukaryota
- Kingdom: Animalia
- Phylum: Arthropoda
- Class: Insecta
- Order: Lepidoptera
- Superfamily: Noctuoidea
- Family: Noctuidae
- Genus: Euxoa
- Species: E. simulata

Binomial name
- Euxoa simulata McDunnough, 1946

= Euxoa simulata =

Species of moth

Euxoa simulata is a moth of the family Noctuidae. It is found from British Columbia down to California.
