= Hellinsia gratiosus =

Scientific classification
- Domain: Eukaryota
- Kingdom: Animalia
- Phylum: Arthropoda
- Class: Insecta
- Order: Lepidoptera
- Family: Pterophoridae
- Genus: Hellinsia
- Species: H. gratiosus

Binomial name
- Hellinsia gratiosus (Fish, 1881)

Synonyms
- Oidaematophorus gratiosus Fish, 1881

Species of plume moth

Hellinsia gratiosus is a moth of the family Pterophoridae. It is found in North America (including California, British Columbia and Alberta)

The wingspan is about 22 millimetres (0.87 in). The head and palpi are dark brown and the antennae are pale brownish, dotted above with white and dark-brown scales. The thorax is greyish brown, although the anterior portion is lighter. The abdomen is fawn brown and the legs are greyish brown. The forewings are pale cinereous, dusted with dark brown. There is an oblique brown spot located before the base of the fissure and a longitudinal brown costal line nearly opposite the base of the fissure. The fringes are concolorous with the wings. The hindwings and fringes are brownish cinereous, although the third feather is whitish.
