= Elachista symmorpha =

Scientific classification
- Domain: Eukaryota
- Kingdom: Animalia
- Phylum: Arthropoda
- Class: Insecta
- Order: Lepidoptera
- Family: Elachistidae
- Genus: Elachista
- Species: E. symmorpha

Binomial name
- Elachista symmorpha Braun, 1948

Species of moth

Elachista symmorpha is a moth of the family Elachistidae. It is found in California and Oregon in the United States.

The length of the forewings is 5.5 mm.
