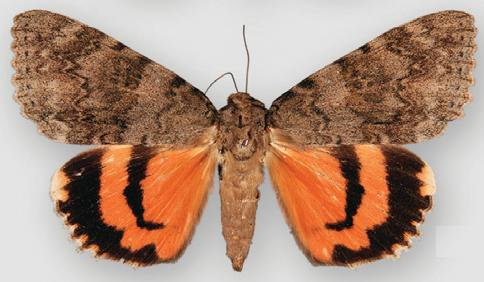

Scientific classification
- Kingdom: Animalia
- Phylum: Arthropoda
- Class: Insecta
- Order: Lepidoptera
- Superfamily: Noctuoidea
- Family: Erebidae
- Genus: Catocala
- Species: C. texanae

Binomial name
- Catocala texanae French, 1902

Synonyms
- Catocala texana

= Catocala texanae =

Species of moth

Catocala texanae, the Texan underwing, is a moth of the family Erebidae. The species was first described by George Hazen French in 1902. It is found in the US state of Texas.

Adults are on wing from May to June. There is probably one generation per year.
