= Elachista synopla =

Scientific classification
- Domain: Eukaryota
- Kingdom: Animalia
- Phylum: Arthropoda
- Class: Insecta
- Order: Lepidoptera
- Family: Elachistidae
- Genus: Elachista
- Species: E. synopla

Binomial name
- Elachista synopla Braun, 1948

Species of moth

Elachista synopla is a moth of the family Elachistidae. It is found in Wyoming and Utah in the United States.

The length of the forewings is 5.6 mm.
