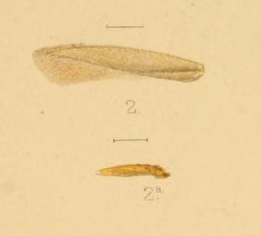

Scientific classification
- Kingdom: Animalia
- Phylum: Arthropoda
- Class: Insecta
- Order: Lepidoptera
- Family: Coleophoridae
- Genus: Coleophora
- Species: C. viridicuprella

Binomial name
- Coleophora viridicuprella Walsingham, 1882

= Coleophora viridicuprella =

Species of moth

Coleophora viridicuprella is a moth of the family Coleophoridae and was first described by Thomas de Grey, 6th Baron Walsingham in 1882. It is found in the United States, including California and Oregon. A related species with the same coloring is the Coleophora aenusella, de Grey believed this may have been the same species as the virdicuprella.

The larvae feed on the seeds of Juncus species. They create a trivalved, tubular silken case.

== Description ==
The wingspan is 9 millimeters.

Most parts of the moth including the pedipalp, antennae, and fore-wings are described as bearing a greenish-bronze color. The antennae includes some notes of white, the fore-wings also include grey cilia. The hind-wings are described with a brown color.
