= Elachista solitaria =

Scientific classification
- Domain: Eukaryota
- Kingdom: Animalia
- Phylum: Arthropoda
- Class: Insecta
- Order: Lepidoptera
- Family: Elachistidae
- Genus: Elachista
- Species: E. solitaria

Binomial name
- Elachista solitaria Braun, 1922

Species of moth

Elachista solitaria is a moth of the family Elachistidae. It is found in the United States, where it has been recorded from Florida, Kentucky and Ohio.

The wingspan is 5–5.5 mm. Adults have been recorded on wing from June to July.

The larvae feed on Panicum species. They mine the leaves of their host plant. Mining larvae can be found from the end of May to the end of June.
