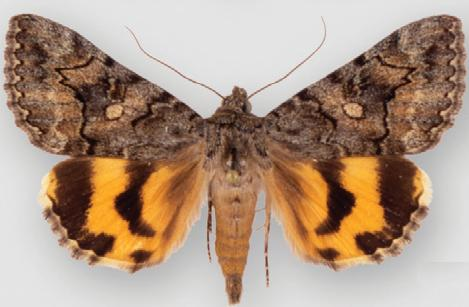

Scientific classification
- Kingdom: Animalia
- Phylum: Arthropoda
- Class: Insecta
- Order: Lepidoptera
- Superfamily: Noctuoidea
- Family: Erebidae
- Genus: Catocala
- Species: C. mcdunnoughi

Binomial name
- Catocala mcdunnoughi Brower, 1937

Synonyms
- Catocala mcdunnoughi browerarum Johnson, 1983

= Catocala mcdunnoughi =

McDunnough's underwing

Species of moth

Catocala mcdunnoughi, or McDunnough's underwing, is a moth of the family Erebidae. The species was first described by Auburn Edmund Brower in 1937. It is found in the US state of California.

Adults are on wing from June to August. There is probably one generation per year.

The larvae feed on Quercus chrysolepis.
