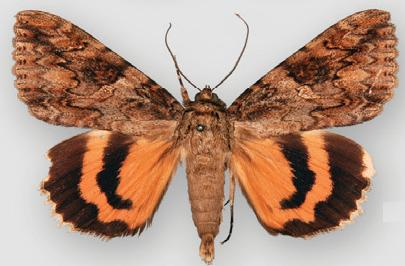

Scientific classification
- Kingdom: Animalia
- Phylum: Arthropoda
- Class: Insecta
- Order: Lepidoptera
- Superfamily: Noctuoidea
- Family: Erebidae
- Genus: Catocala
- Species: C. irene

Binomial name
- Catocala irene Behr, 1870

Synonyms
- Catocala volumnia H. Edwards, 1880; Catocala virgilia H. Edwards, 1880; Catocala irene var. valeria H. Edwards, 1880

= Catocala irene =

Irene's underwing

Species of moth

Catocala irene, or Irene's underwing, is a moth of the family Erebidae first described by Hans Hermann Behr in 1870. It is found in the western United States in Utah and California and Nevada.

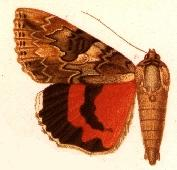
Illustration

The wingspan is 65–75 mm. Adults are on wing from July to September depending on the location. There is probably one generation per year.

The larvae feed on Populus and Salix species.

== Subspecies ==
- Catocala irene irene
- Catocala irene valeria H. Edwards, 1880 (Arizona)
