= Hellinsia eros =

Scientific classification
- Kingdom: Animalia
- Phylum: Arthropoda
- Class: Insecta
- Order: Lepidoptera
- Family: Pterophoridae
- Genus: Hellinsia
- Species: H. eros

Binomial name
- Hellinsia eros (Barnes & Lindsey, 1921)

Synonyms
- Oidaematophorus eros Barnes & Lindsey, 1921

Species of plume moth

Hellinsia eros is a moth of the family Pterophoridae first described by William Barnes and Arthur Ward Lindsey in 1921. It is found in California and Arizona (including the type location, Mohave County).

The wingspan is 14-17.5 mm. The head and thorax are white, the former with some gray-brown scales above and in front and the latter with a cluster of blackish-brown scales behind. The abdomen is mostly white but with a few gray-brown scales. The posterior margins of the segments have some paired dorsal dots. The antennae are white with gray-brown dots above. The palpi are white with scattered gray-brown scales, especially on the sides. The legs are mostly white. The forewings are whitish with gray-brown irroration (sprinkles) and spots. The hindwings are light brownish gray.

Adults have been recorded in September.
