= Hellinsia iobates =

Scientific classification
- Domain: Eukaryota
- Kingdom: Animalia
- Phylum: Arthropoda
- Class: Insecta
- Order: Lepidoptera
- Family: Pterophoridae
- Genus: Hellinsia
- Species: H. iobates

Binomial name
- Hellinsia iobates (Barnes & Lindsey, 1921)

Synonyms
- Oidaematophorus iobates Barnes & Lindsey, 1921

Species of plume moth

Hellinsia iobates is a moth of the family Pterophoridae that is found in the U.S. state of Arizona. The species was first described by William Barnes and Arthur Ward Lindsey in 1921.

The wingspan is 17–20 millimetres (0.67–0.79 in). The head is brown above and in front and brownish white between the antennae. These are slender with a somewhat broken brown line above. The thorax and abdomen are brownish white, the latter sprinkled with brown scales about as heavily as the forewings and usually marked with single brown dorsal dots in the posterior margins of the segments and a powdery ventral line. The forewings are brownish white to pale tawny, in the first case a little ocherous in first lobe and in the second more whitish toward the base. The wings are sprinkled with dark brown scales, most heavily in the second lobe and along the inner half. The irroration is limited to these areas in some specimens. The costa is usually darkened with these scales in the basal half, always with a long dash over the base of the cleft and one or two spots beyond, the outer one larger. The irroration forms a poorly defined spot at the base of the cleft and sometimes a smaller spot near the middle of the cell. The fringes are concolorous with the wing on the inner margin and in the base of the cleft, becoming much darker toward the apices of both lobes. The dark areas contain brownish-black basal scales at the apices of the lobes, and a few clusters of pale scales before the apices. The hindwings and fringes are pale gray brown.
