= Elachista salinaris =

Scientific classification
- Domain: Eukaryota
- Kingdom: Animalia
- Phylum: Arthropoda
- Class: Insecta
- Order: Lepidoptera
- Family: Elachistidae
- Genus: Elachista
- Species: E. salinaris

Binomial name
- Elachista salinaris Braun, 1925

Species of moth

Elachista salinaris is a moth of the family Elachistidae. It is found in the United States, where it has been recorded from Utah and California.

The wingspan is about 11 mm. Adults have been recorded on wing in May.

The larvae feed on Scirpus paludosus. They mine the leaves of their host plant.
