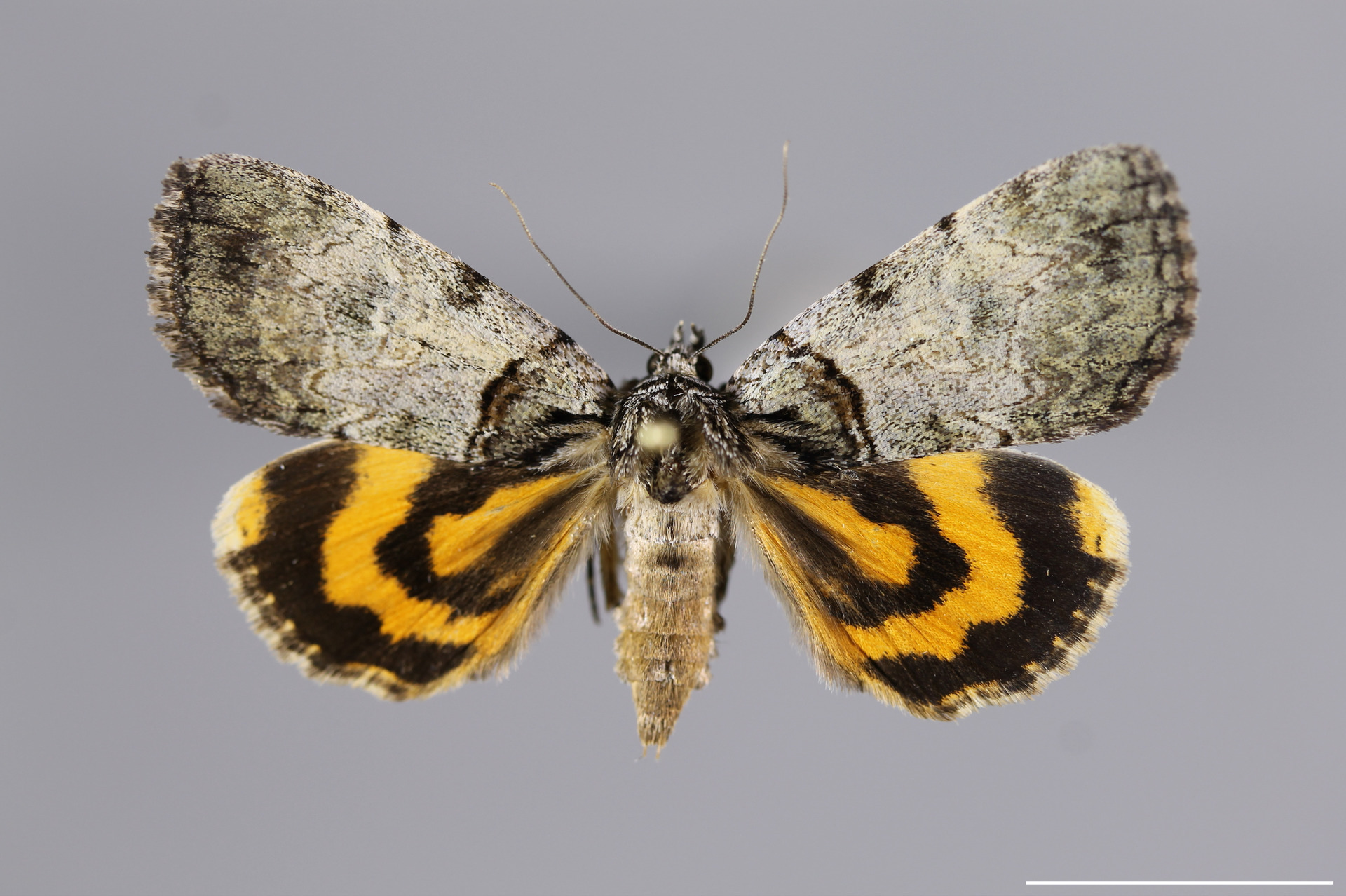

Scientific classification
- Kingdom: Animalia
- Phylum: Arthropoda
- Class: Insecta
- Order: Lepidoptera
- Superfamily: Noctuoidea
- Family: Erebidae
- Genus: Catocala
- Species: C. dulciola

Binomial name
- Catocala dulciola Grote, 1881

Synonyms
- Ephesia dulciola

= Catocala dulciola =

Species of moth

Catocala dulciola, the quiet underwing or sweet underwing, is a species of moth in the family Erebidae. The species was first described by Augustus Radcliffe Grote in 1881. It is found in the United States from New York through Virginia, west to Missouri and north to Illinois and Michigan.

The wingspan is 40–45 mm. Adults are on wing from June to July depending on the location. There is probably one generation per year.

The larvae feed on Crataegus.
