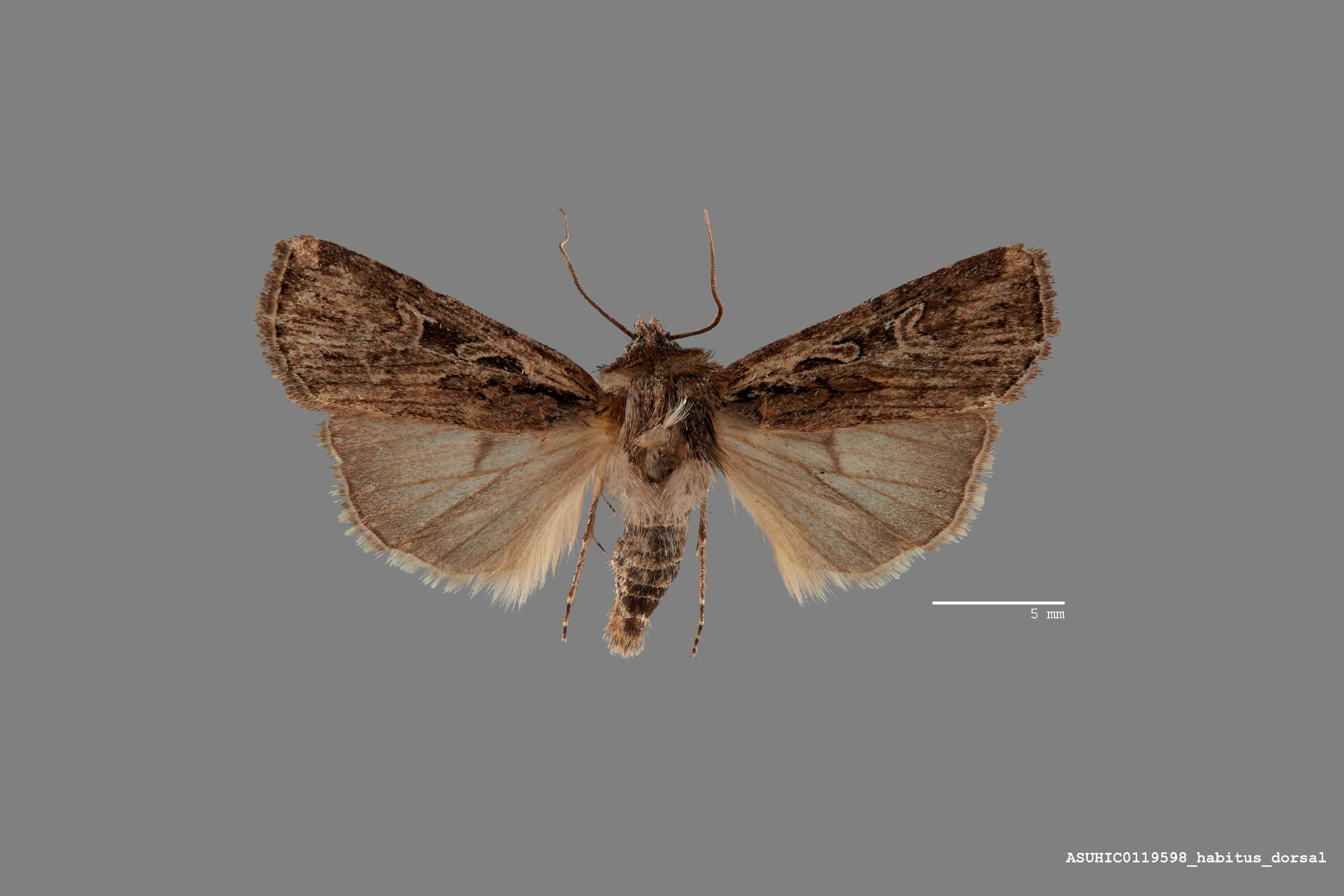

Scientific classification
- Domain: Eukaryota
- Kingdom: Animalia
- Phylum: Arthropoda
- Class: Insecta
- Order: Lepidoptera
- Superfamily: Noctuoidea
- Family: Noctuidae
- Genus: Euxoa
- Species: E. agema

Binomial name
- Euxoa agema (Strecker, 1899)

Synonyms
- Agrotis agema Strecker, 1899

= Euxoa agema =

Species of moth

Euxoa agema is a moth of the family Noctuidae. It is found from British Columbia, south to Colorado and California.

The wingspan is about 30 mm.
