= Hellinsia inconditus =

Scientific classification
- Domain: Eukaryota
- Kingdom: Animalia
- Phylum: Arthropoda
- Class: Insecta
- Order: Lepidoptera
- Family: Pterophoridae
- Genus: Hellinsia
- Species: H. inconditus

Binomial name
- Hellinsia inconditus (Walsingham, 1880)

Synonyms
- Lioptilus inconditus Walsingham, 1880

Species of plume moth

Hellinsia inconditus is a moth of the family Pterophoridae. It is found in North America (including California, Texas, Arizona, Utah and British Columbia).

The wingspan is about 19 millimetres (0.75 in). The head is pale brownish grey, but paler between the whitish antennae. The thorax and abdomen are slightly tinged with yellowish and the legs are yellowish white. The forewings are very pale brownish grey or bone colour, without any markings except faint traces of darker lines upon some of the veins. The fringes are slightly paler than the wings. The hindwings and fringes are very slightly darker, with a more decided cinereous tinge. The underside of all wings is brownish grey, with the costal margin of the forewings slightly paler.
