= Elachista triangulifera =

Scientific classification
- Domain: Eukaryota
- Kingdom: Animalia
- Phylum: Arthropoda
- Class: Insecta
- Order: Lepidoptera
- Family: Elachistidae
- Genus: Elachista
- Species: E. triangulifera

Binomial name
- Elachista triangulifera Kaila, 1997

Species of moth

Elachista triangulifera is a moth of the family Elachistidae. It was first described from Oregon and is also known from California (the United States).

The length of the forewings is 5.2 millimetres (0.20 in).

== Etymology ==
The species name is derived from Latin triangulus and -fera (meaning "bearing a triangle").
