= Eupithecia implorata =

Scientific classification
- Domain: Eukaryota
- Kingdom: Animalia
- Phylum: Arthropoda
- Class: Insecta
- Order: Lepidoptera
- Family: Geometridae
- Genus: Eupithecia
- Species: E. implorata

Binomial name
- Eupithecia implorata (Hulst, 1896)

Synonyms
- Tephroclystia implorata Hulst, 1896

Species of moth

Eupithecia implorata is a moth in the family Geometridae first described by George Duryea Hulst in 1896. It is found in the US states of California and Arizona.

The wingspan is about 23 mm. Adults have been recorded on wing from January to July.
