= Elachista argentosa =

Scientific classification
- Domain: Eukaryota
- Kingdom: Animalia
- Phylum: Arthropoda
- Class: Insecta
- Order: Lepidoptera
- Family: Elachistidae
- Genus: Elachista
- Species: E. argentosa

Binomial name
- Elachista argentosa Braun, 1920

Species of moth

Elachista argentosa is a moth of the family Elachistidae. It is found in the United States, where it has been recorded from Ohio and Maine.

The wingspan is 7–8 mm. Adults have been recorded on wing from May to August.

The larvae feed on Carex species. Mining larvae can be found in April and early May.
