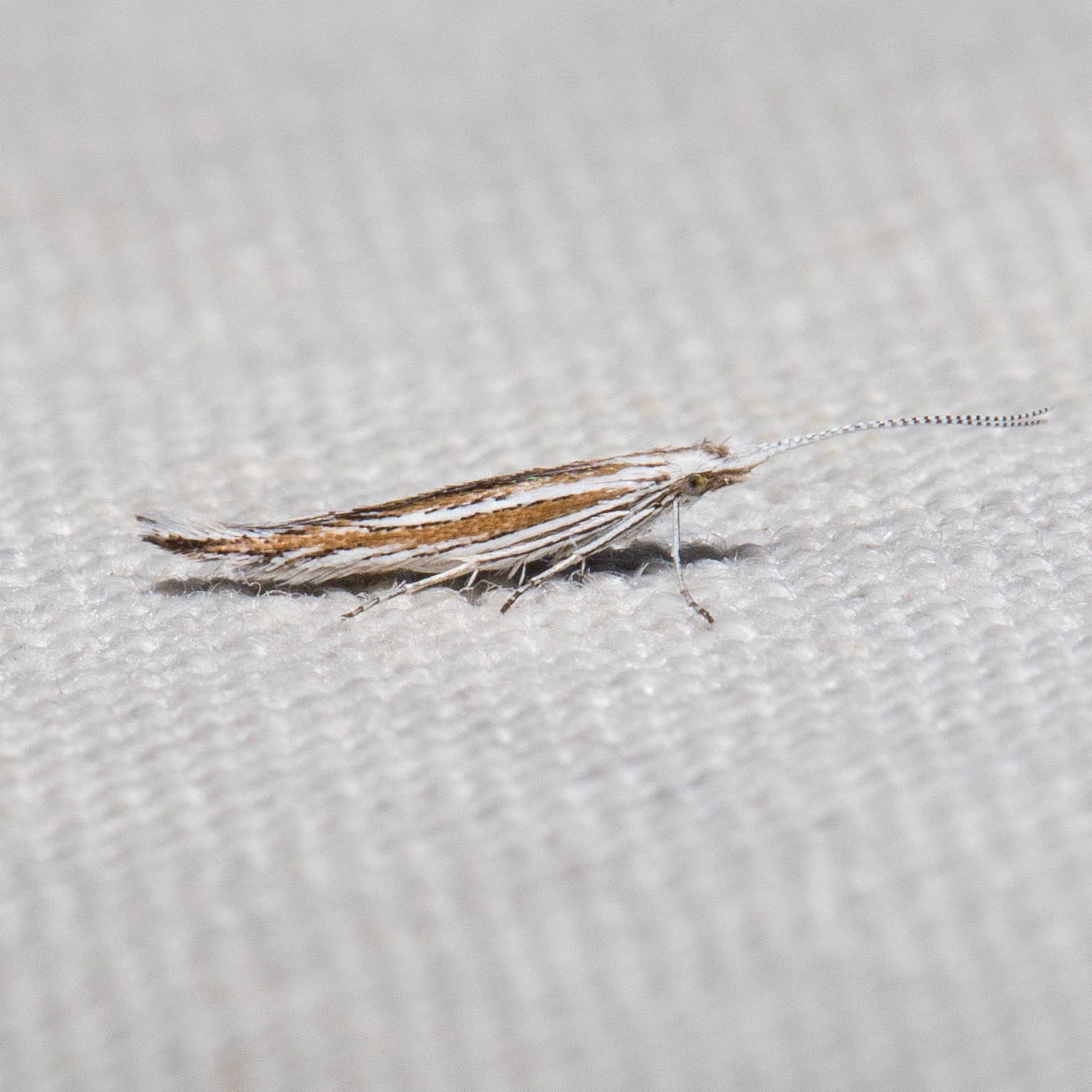

Scientific classification
- Kingdom: Animalia
- Phylum: Arthropoda
- Class: Insecta
- Order: Lepidoptera
- Family: Coleophoridae
- Genus: Coleophora
- Species: C. nigrostriata

Binomial name
- Coleophora nigrostriata Walsingham, 1882

= Coleophora nigrostriata =

Species of moth

Coleophora nigrostriata is a moth of the family Coleophoridae. It is found in the United States, including Oregon.
