= Elachista adianta =

Scientific classification
- Domain: Eukaryota
- Kingdom: Animalia
- Phylum: Arthropoda
- Class: Insecta
- Order: Lepidoptera
- Family: Elachistidae
- Genus: Elachista
- Species: E. adianta

Binomial name
- Elachista adianta Kaila, 1997

Species of moth

Elachista adianta is a moth of the family Elachistidae that is endemic to Colorado.

The length of the forewings is 5.2–6.8 millimetres (0.20–0.27 in).
