= Eupithecia nabokovi =

Scientific classification
- Kingdom: Animalia
- Phylum: Arthropoda
- Clade: Pancrustacea
- Class: Insecta
- Order: Lepidoptera
- Family: Geometridae
- Genus: Eupithecia
- Species: E. nabokovi

Binomial name
- Eupithecia nabokovi McDunnough, 1946

Species of moth

Eupithecia nabokovi is a moth in the family Geometridae first described by James Halliday McDunnough in 1946. It is found in the US states of California, Arizona, New Mexico, Utah, Colorado and Wyoming.

The wingspan is about 19 mm. Both the forewings and hindwings are gray brown.
