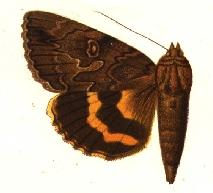

Scientific classification
- Kingdom: Animalia
- Phylum: Arthropoda
- Class: Insecta
- Order: Lepidoptera
- Superfamily: Noctuoidea
- Family: Erebidae
- Genus: Catocala
- Species: C. muliercula

Binomial name
- Catocala muliercula Guenée, 1852

Synonyms
- Catabapta muliercula; Catocala permanans Hulst, 1884; Catocala muliercula permanans

= Catocala muliercula =

Little wife underwing

Species of moth

Catocala muliercula, the little wife underwing, is a moth of the family Erebidae. The species was first described by Achille Guenée in 1852. It is found in the US from Massachusetts and Connecticut south to Florida and west to Texas and New Mexico.

The wingspan is 54–70 mm. Adults are on wing from May to July depending on the location. There is probably one generation per year.

The larvae feed on Myrica cerifera.
