= Elachista sabulella =

Scientific classification
- Domain: Eukaryota
- Kingdom: Animalia
- Phylum: Arthropoda
- Class: Insecta
- Order: Lepidoptera
- Family: Elachistidae
- Genus: Elachista
- Species: E. sabulella

Binomial name
- Elachista sabulella Kaila, 1997

Species of moth

Elachista sabulella is a moth of the family Elachistidae which is endemic to California. The name of the species is derived from the Latin sabulum, meaning gravel or sand.
