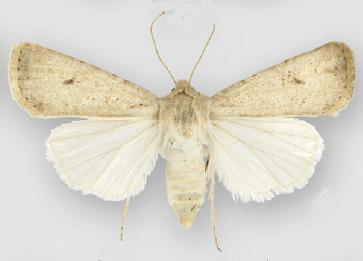
- Female

Scientific classification
- Domain: Eukaryota
- Kingdom: Animalia
- Phylum: Arthropoda
- Class: Insecta
- Order: Lepidoptera
- Superfamily: Noctuoidea
- Family: Noctuidae
- Genus: Euxoa
- Species: E. tronellus

Binomial name
- Euxoa tronellus Smith, 1903

Synonyms
- Euxoa tronella

= Euxoa tronellus =

Species of moth

Euxoa tronellus is a moth of the family Noctuidae first described by Smith in 1903. It is found in western North America.

The wingspan is 32–36 mm. The moth flies from August to September depending on the location.
