= Coleophora argentialbella =

Scientific classification
- Kingdom: Animalia
- Phylum: Arthropoda
- Clade: Pancrustacea
- Class: Insecta
- Order: Lepidoptera
- Family: Coleophoridae
- Genus: Coleophora
- Species: C. argentialbella

Binomial name
- Coleophora argentialbella Chambers, 1874

Species of moth

Coleophora argentialbella is a moth of the family Coleophoridae. It is found in the United States, including within the states of Kentucky and Oklahoma.
