= Eupithecia cestata =

Scientific classification
- Domain: Eukaryota
- Kingdom: Animalia
- Phylum: Arthropoda
- Class: Insecta
- Order: Lepidoptera
- Family: Geometridae
- Genus: Eupithecia
- Species: E. cestata

Binomial name
- Eupithecia cestata (Hulst, 1896)

Synonyms
- Tephroclystia cestata Hulst, 1896

Species of moth

Eupithecia cestata is a moth in the family Geometridae first described by George Duryea Hulst in 1896. It is found in the US state of California.

The wingspan is about 20–21 millimetres (0.79–0.83 in). Adults have been recorded on wing from March to June.
