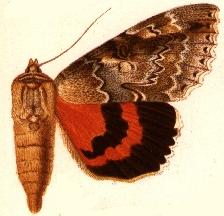

Scientific classification
- Kingdom: Animalia
- Phylum: Arthropoda
- Class: Insecta
- Order: Lepidoptera
- Superfamily: Noctuoidea
- Family: Erebidae
- Genus: Catocala
- Species: C. marmorata

Binomial name
- Catocala marmorata W. H. Edwards, 1864

= Catocala marmorata =

Species of moth

Catocala marmorata, the marbled underwing, is a moth of the family Erebidae. The species was first described by William Henry Edwards in 1864. It is found in the United States from Vermont to South Carolina and west to Indiana and Illinois.

The wingspan is 85–95 millimetres (3.3–3.7 in). Adults are on wing from July to September depending on the location. There is probably one generation per year.

The larvae feed on Populus and Salix species.
