= Hellinsia corvus =

Scientific classification
- Domain: Eukaryota
- Kingdom: Animalia
- Phylum: Arthropoda
- Class: Insecta
- Order: Lepidoptera
- Family: Pterophoridae
- Genus: Hellinsia
- Species: H. corvus

Binomial name
- Hellinsia corvus (Barnes & Lindsey, 1921)

Synonyms
- Oidaematophorus corvus Barnes & Lindsey, 1921

Species of plume moth

Hellinsia corvus is a moth of the family Pterophoridae first described by William Barnes and Arthur Ward Lindsey in 1921. The species is found in California, Colorado, Alberta and British Columbia.

The wingspan is 17–20 millimetres (0.67–0.79 in). The head is brown, but pale yellow between the antennae. These are whitish, dotted with brown above. The thorax and abdomen are pale yellow to very pale greyish yellow, the latter with a fine light brown dorsal line. The thorax is yellowish in front in darker specimens and slightly brownish above in the lighter ones. The forewings are clear pale yellow in the lightest specimens, with some brown scales near base, sometimes a small brown dot a short distance before the base of the cleft, and sometimes a brown subcostal shade which meets the costa in the first lobe. Sometimes, the wings have a pale yellowish or greyish yellow costal band running from the base to a point opposite the base of the cleft. Behind this the entire wing is clothed with brownish grey mixed with very pale yellowish scales, becoming more whitish toward the inner margin. The costal fringes on the first lobe are yellowish, while others are dark greyish. The hindwings and their fringes are brownish grey, in the pale specimens appearing dark in contrast to the yellow forewings.
