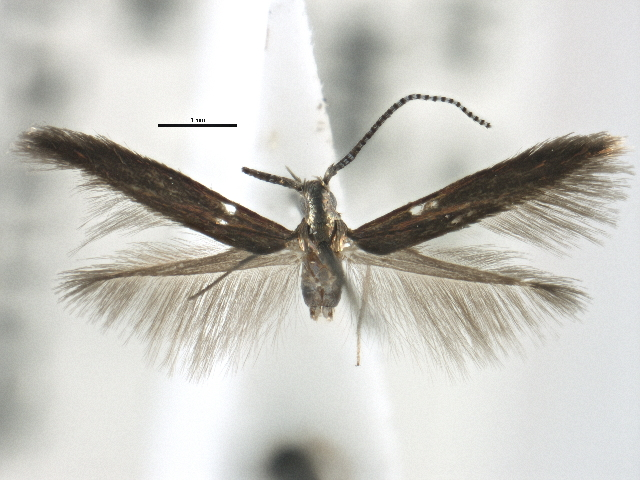

Scientific classification
- Kingdom: Animalia
- Phylum: Arthropoda
- Clade: Pancrustacea
- Class: Insecta
- Order: Lepidoptera
- Family: Coleophoridae
- Genus: Coleophora
- Species: C. alabama

Binomial name
- Coleophora alabama Landry, 1994

= Coleophora alabama =

Species of moth

Coleophora alabama is a moth of the family Coleophoridae. It is found in coastal Alabama and Texas in the United States.

The forewing length is 3.5–4.1 mm (0.14–0.16 in).
