= Elachista coniophora =

Scientific classification
- Kingdom: Animalia
- Phylum: Arthropoda
- Class: Insecta
- Order: Lepidoptera
- Family: Elachistidae
- Genus: Elachista
- Species: E. coniophora

Binomial name
- Elachista coniophora Braun, 1948

Species of moth

Elachista coniophora is a moth of the family Elachistidae. It is found in California, United States.

The length of the forewings is 4.5-5.5 mm.
