= Hellinsia serenus =

Scientific classification
- Kingdom: Animalia
- Phylum: Arthropoda
- Class: Insecta
- Order: Lepidoptera
- Family: Pterophoridae
- Genus: Hellinsia
- Species: H. serenus

Binomial name
- Hellinsia serenus (Meyrick, 1913)

Synonyms
- Pterophorus serenus Meyrick, 1913; Oidaematophorus serenus

Species of moth

Hellinsia serenus is a moth of the family Pterophoridae. It is found in Arizona, Utah, and California.

The wingspan is 23–35 mm. The head is cream-white between the antennae, while more or less brownish elsewhere. The antennae are white and the palpi are whitish. The thorax and abdomen are pale yellowish, the latter with two subdorsal pure white stripes and a slender brown dorsal stripe. The forewings are whitish to creamy or yellowish on the inner margin, blending into a deeper dull yellowish colour suffused with a light grey-brown shade in the costal region. The fringes are concolorous. The hindwings and fringes are grey brown, usually contrastingly dark but occasionally rather light in colour.

== Taxonomy ==
Hellinsia serenus is treated as a synonym of Hellinsia balanotes by some authors.
