= Elachista conidia =

Scientific classification
- Domain: Eukaryota
- Kingdom: Animalia
- Phylum: Arthropoda
- Class: Insecta
- Order: Lepidoptera
- Family: Elachistidae
- Genus: Elachista
- Species: E. conidia

Binomial name
- Elachista conidia Kaila, 1997

Species of moth

Elachista conidia is a moth of the family Elachistidae that is found in California, United States.

The length of the forewings is 6.3 millimetres (0.25 in).
