= Elachista lenape =

Scientific classification
- Kingdom: Animalia
- Phylum: Arthropoda
- Class: Insecta
- Order: Lepidoptera
- Family: Elachistidae
- Genus: Elachista
- Species: E. lenape

Binomial name
- Elachista lenape Kaila, 1996

Species of moth

Elachista lenape is a moth of the family Elachistidae. It is found in the United States, where it has been recorded from New Jersey.
