= Elachista nucula =

Scientific classification
- Domain: Eukaryota
- Kingdom: Animalia
- Phylum: Arthropoda
- Class: Insecta
- Order: Lepidoptera
- Family: Elachistidae
- Genus: Elachista
- Species: E. nucula

Binomial name
- Elachista nucula Kaila, 1997

Species of moth

Elachista nucula is a moth of the family Elachistidae first described from Colorado and also known from Utah.

The length of the forewings is 5–5.1 millimetres (0.20–0.20 in).

== Etymology ==
The species name is derived from Latin nucula (meaning kernel).
