= Elachista aphyodes =

Scientific classification
- Kingdom: Animalia
- Phylum: Arthropoda
- Class: Insecta
- Order: Lepidoptera
- Family: Elachistidae
- Genus: Elachista
- Species: E. aphyodes

Binomial name
- Elachista aphyodes Kaila, 1997

Species of moth

Elachista aphyodes is a moth of the family Elachistidae. It is found in Utah, United States.

The length of the forewings is 5.9 mm.
