= Eupithecia macfarlandi =

Scientific classification
- Domain: Eukaryota
- Kingdom: Animalia
- Phylum: Arthropoda
- Class: Insecta
- Order: Lepidoptera
- Family: Geometridae
- Genus: Eupithecia
- Species: E. macfarlandi

Binomial name
- Eupithecia macfarlandi Ferris, 2007

Species of moth

Eupithecia macfarlandi is a moth in the family Geometridae first described by Clifford D. Ferris in 2007. It is found in canyons on the east side of the Huachuca Mountains in the US state of Arizona. The habitat consists of oak and oak-conifer forests.

The length of the forewings is 9–9.5 mm for males and 9.5–11.0 mm for females. Adults are on wing from late August to mid-September.
