= Eupithecia cretata =

Scientific classification
- Domain: Eukaryota
- Kingdom: Animalia
- Phylum: Arthropoda
- Class: Insecta
- Order: Lepidoptera
- Family: Geometridae
- Genus: Eupithecia
- Species: E. cretata

Binomial name
- Eupithecia cretata (Hulst, 1896)

Synonyms
- Tephroclystia cretata Hulst, 1896

Species of moth

Eupithecia cretata is a moth in the family Geometridae first described by George Duryea Hulst in 1896. It is found in the US state of Colorado.

The forewings are pale. There is a broad, smoky brown terminal band on both wings.
