= Coleophora fagicorticella =

Scientific classification
- Kingdom: Animalia
- Phylum: Arthropoda
- Clade: Pancrustacea
- Class: Insecta
- Order: Lepidoptera
- Family: Coleophoridae
- Genus: Coleophora
- Species: C. fagicorticella

Binomial name
- Coleophora fagicorticella Chambers, 1874

Species of moth

Coleophora fagicorticella is a moth of the family Coleophoridae. It is found in the United States, including Kentucky.

The larvae feed on the seeds of Juncus compactus. They create a tubular silken seed case.
