= Coleophora suaedicola =

Scientific classification
- Kingdom: Animalia
- Phylum: Arthropoda
- Class: Insecta
- Order: Lepidoptera
- Family: Coleophoridae
- Genus: Coleophora
- Species: C. suaedicola

Binomial name
- Coleophora suaedicola Cockerell, 1898

Species of moth

Coleophora suaedicola is a moth of the family Coleophoridae. It is found in the United States, including Indiana.

The larvae feed on the leaves of Suaeda species. They create a trivalved, tubular silken case.
