= Elachista radiantella =

Scientific classification
- Domain: Eukaryota
- Kingdom: Animalia
- Phylum: Arthropoda
- Class: Insecta
- Order: Lepidoptera
- Family: Elachistidae
- Genus: Elachista
- Species: E. radiantella

Binomial name
- Elachista radiantella Braun, 1922

Species of moth

Elachista radiantella is a moth of the family Elachistidae. It is found in the United States, where it has been observed in the District of Columbia, Virginia, Ohio, Kentucky and Maine.

The wingspan is 5.5-6.4 mm. Adults have been recorded on wing from June to July.

The larvae mine the leaves of several Panicum species, often Panicum dichotomum and Panicum clandestinum.
