= List of things named after J. R. R. Tolkien and his works =

The British author J. R. R. Tolkien (1892–1973) and the names of fictional characters and places he invented for his legendarium have had a substantial impact on culture, and have become the namesakes of various things around and outside the world, including street names, mountains, companies, species of animals and plants, asteroids, and other notable objects.

== Astronomy ==
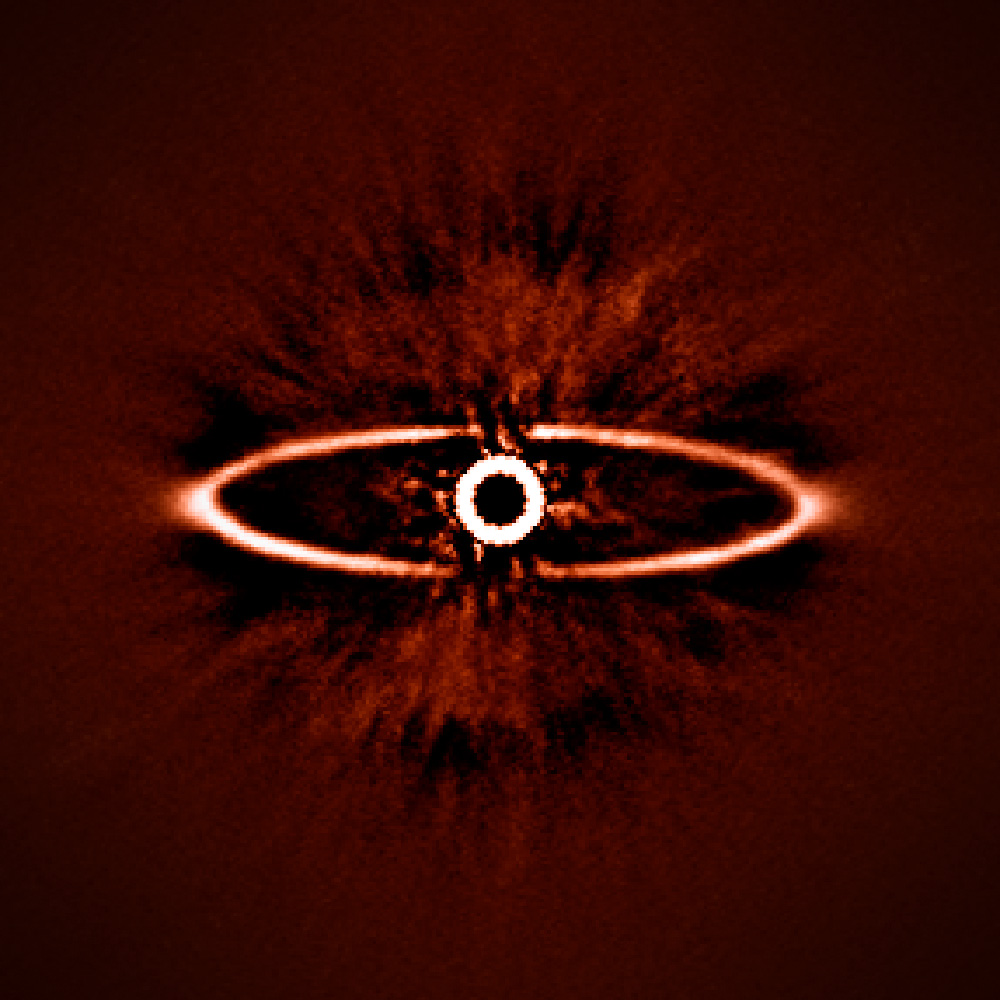
"Eye of Sauron": dust ring around HR 4796A. The black circle at the centre is the telescope's coronagraph.

- The asteroids 2991 Bilbo and 2675 Tolkien were both discovered and named in 1982.
- The Kuiper belt object 385446 Manwë and its moon Thorondor were discovered in 2003.
- Earendel, the most-distant known star.
- The nickname "Eye of Sauron" has been given to multiple eye-like objects, namely the planetary nebulae M 1-42 and Helix Nebula, the star system HR 4796A, the intermediate spiral Seyfert galaxy NGC 4151, the star Fomalhaut, and the image of a cosmic jet - directed towards Earth - from blazar PKS 1424+240.
- The Mars-crossing asteroid 378214 Sauron was discovered in 2007.
- The trans-Neptunian object 174567 Varda and its moon Ilmarë were discovered in 2006 and 2011 (respectively) and named in 2014.

=== Geography of Titan ===
By convention, certain classes of features on Saturn's moon Titan are named after elements from Middle-earth. Colles (small hills or knobs) are named for characters, while montes (mountains) are named for mountains of Middle-earth.

==== Colles ====
Collis	Coordinates	Diameter (km)	Named after
Arwen Colles	7.5°S 250.0°W	64	Arwen, character from The Lord of the Rings
Bilbo Colles	4.2°S 38.6°W	164	bilbo, character from The Lord of the Rings
Faramir Colles	4.0°N 153.8°W	82	Faramir, character from The Lord of the Rings
Gandalf Colles	14.6°N 209.5°W	102	Gandalf, character from The Lord of the Rings
Handir Colles	10.0°N 356.7°W	100	Handir, character from The Silmarillion
Nimloth Colles	11.9°N 151.3°W	90	Nimloth, name of a character and a tree from Middle-earth

==== Montes ====
Mons	Coordinates	Named after
Angmar Montes	10.0°S 221.0°W	Mountains of Angmar
Dolmed Montes	11.6°S 216.8°W	Mount Dolmed
Doom Mons	14.65°S 40.42°W	Mount Doom
Echoriat Montes	7.4°S 213.8°W	Echoriath
Erebor Mons	4.97°S 36.23°W	Erebor, the Lonely Mountain
Gram Montes	9.9°S 207.9°W	Mount Gram
Irensaga Montes	5.68°S 212.71°W	Irensaga
Merlock Montes	8.9°S 211.8°W	Merlock Mountains
Mindolluin Montes	3.3°S 208.96°W	Mindolluin
Misty Montes	56.8°N 62.44°W	Misty Mountains
Mithrim Montes	2.16°S 127.42°W	Mountains of Mithrim
Moria Montes	15.1°N 190.5°W	Mountains of Moria
Rerir Montes	4.8°S 212.1°W	Mount Rerir
Taniquetil Montes	3.67°S 213.26°W	Taniquetil

=== Other planetary bodies ===
==== Mercury ====
A crater adjacent the planet's north pole, Tolkien, is named after the author.

==== Pluto system ====
Various maculae on Pluto and Charon are unofficially named after subjects in Middle Earth.

Maculae	Object	Coordinates	Named after
Balrog Macula	Pluto	10°S 80°W	Balrog, a race of demons from the mythos.
Mordor Macula	Charon	80°N 00°W	Mordor It was nicknamed after the shadow lands in Tolkien's The Lord of the Rings, which it resembles in shape. It is now officially named "Neverland Regio", after Neverland, a fictional island featured in Peter Pan.
Morgoth Macula	Pluto	20°S 172°E	Morgoth, the dark lord of Arda and the main antagonist up to the First Age.

== Individuals ==
- Troels Kløvedal (born Troels Beha Erichsen) changed his last name to Danish for Rivendell after joining the Svanemølle-collective.
- Gurli Marie Kløvedal, Danish author and journalist and daughter of Troels Kløvedal
- Pernille Kløvedal Nørgaard, Danish actor
- Ebbe Kløvedal Reich, Danish author and political commentator
- Nadia Kløvedal Reich, Danish author and daughter of Ebbe Kløvedal
- Mogens Kløvedal Pedersen, Danish screen writer
- Lasse Legolas, Danish football player for Odense Boldklub

== Companies and other entities ==
- Anduril Industries, named after Aragorn's sword, is an American defense technology company that specializes in autonomous systems.
- ByWater Solutions is an opensource software company named after the village in the Shire.
- A mining company called Durin Drilling is named about the Dwarven line of kings named Dúrin.
- Iron Crown Enterprises produces role playing, board, miniature, and collectible card games since 1980. Many of ICE's better-known products were related to Tolkien's world of Middle-earth. It was named after the crown worn by Morgoth.
- Isengard Industries is a company building AI-guided precision munitions. It is named after the fortress ruled by Saruman.
- Lembas Capital is a San Francisco-based investment firm named after the Elven waybread that appears in The Lord of the Rings and The Silmarillion. The company invests in both public equity and private equity.
- Lorien Novalis School is a private school in Sydney.
- Middle-earth Enterprises, formerly known as Tolkien Enterprises, is a trading name for a division of The Saul Zaentz Company, located in Berkeley, California. The company owns the worldwide exclusive rights to certain elements of J. R. R. Tolkien's two most famous literary works: The Lord of the Rings and The Hobbit. These elements include the titles of the works, the names of characters contained within as well as the names of places, objects and events within them, and certain short phrases and sayings from the works.
- Mithril, a decentralized social media platform
- Mithril Capital, a venture capital firm which was founded in 2012 by Peter Thiel and Ajay Rojan.
- Palantir Technologies is a private American software and services company, specializing in data analysis. Named after the crystal balls from Tolkien's legendarium, Palantir's original clients were federal agencies of the United States Intelligence Community like CIA and NSA.
- The Rivendell Winery operated from 1987 to December 2008 in New York's Hudson River Valley; in 2003 Rivendell's 2003 Dry Riesling captured the Governor's Cup at the 19th annual New York Wine and Food Classic.
- Rivendell Bicycle Works, a steel frame bicycle producer in Walnut Creek, California, U.S.
- Rivendell School is a private Christian school in Arlington, Virginia.
- The Tolkien Estate is the legal body which manages the property of J. R. R. Tolkien, including the copyright in his works. The individual copyrights have for the most part been assigned by the Estate to subsidiary entities such as the J. R. R. Tolkien Discretionary Settlement and The Tolkien Trust.
- Silmarils, named for the 3 jewels, was a French gaming company known for the Ishar trilogy.
- Valar Atomics is a startup planning to build small nuclear reactors.
- Valar Ventures, named after the Valar, is a US-based venture capital fund founded by Andrew McCormack.

== Writing ==
- Athelas typeface is named after the healing plant from Lord of the Rings.
- The Balrog Awards were given to recognized authors of speculative fiction, named after the race of demons occurring throughout the legendarium.
- The Gandalf Award honored achievement in fantasy literature and were named after the wizard.

=== Comics ===
Sauron, a Marvel supervillain who takes the form of an anthropomorphic pterodactyl and renamed himself after the dark lord. He battled the X-Men as a would-be conqueror.

=== Encryption ===
KHAZAD, a block cipher named after the Dwarvish term for dwarves.

== Genes and proteins ==
- Smaug, a protein that inhibits translation of mRNA nanos (Greek for dwarf) in Drosophila embryos. Named after the dragon Smaug from The Hobbit.
- Glorund, a protein that inhibits translation of mRNA nanos in Drosophila ovaries. Named after Glórund, an early name for Glaurung, the first dragon in Tolkien's legendarium.
- Bard, a gene in Drosophila that encodes the protein Bard, which is essential in degrading the protein Smaug. Named after Bard the Bowman, who killed Smaug in The Hobbit.
- Gimli, Gloin and Legolas, retrotransposon elements in the Arabidopsis thaliana plant. Named after two dwarves and an elf.
- Galadriel, a retrotransposon from Lycopersicon esculentum. Named after the elf.

== Scientific hardware and software ==
- An astrophysical method for locating gamma ray bursts has been named BALROG, for "BAyesian Location Reconstruction Of GRBs".
- A prokaryotic gene finder is named Balrog (Bacterial Annotation via Learned Representation of Genes).
- A protein model used to assess genome annotation is named PSAURON (Protein Sequence Assessment Using a Reference ORF Network).
- An astronomical telescope at the Lowell Observatory, using a main mirror with spherical curvature, has the acronym PALANTIR, standing for Precision Array of Large-Aperture New Telescopes for Image Reconstruction.

== Individual plants and animals ==
- Iluvatar is a redwood tree in Prairie Creek Redwoods State Park in Northern California that has been confirmed to be at least 20.5 feet (6.2 m) in diameter at breast height, and 320 feet (98 m) in height. Measured by botanist Stephen C. Sillett, it is the world's third-largest coast redwood, the largest being Lost Monarch.
- Silmaril is a retired American thoroughbred mare racehorse named after the Silmarils featured in The Silmarillion.

== Geographical features ==
=== Mountains ===
- Four mountains in the Cadwallader Range of British Columbia, Canada: Mount Shadowfax, Mount Gandalf, Mount Aragorn, and Tolkien Peak.
- On 1 December 2012, a bid was launched for the New Zealand Geographic Board to name a mountain peak near Milford Sound after Tolkien to mark Tolkien's 121st birthday.

=== Seamounts ===
Several undersea features in the North Atlantic Ocean, west of Ireland and south of Iceland, including:

- Eriador Seamount
- Rohan Seamount
- Gondor Seamount
- Fangorn Bank
- Edoras Bank
- Isengard Ridge

At least three seamounts in the Indian Ocean, including:

- Eye of Sauron
- Barad-dûr
- Ered Lithui

=== Caves ===
- Gondolin Cave, named after the fallen city in the Silmarillion, is not far from Tolkien's birthplace in Bloemfontein, South Africa.

== Music ==
- Amon Amarth, a Swedish melodic death metal band, that takes its name from the Sindarin name of Mount Doom.
- Burzum, a Norwegian music project founded by Varg Vikernes in 1991. The word "burzum" means "darkness" in the Black Speech, a fictional language crafted by Tolkien.
- Carach Angren is a Dutch symphonic black metal band founded in 2003. Named after a mountain pass in Mordor.
- Cirith Ungol, an American heavy metal band founded in 1971 named for a mountain pass in Mordor, through which Frodo, Sam, and Gollum ventured.
- Ephel Duath, an Italian avant garde metal/hardcore punk band, formed in 1998 took their name after the mountain range in The Lord of the Rings.
- Galadriel, an Australian progressive rock band formed in 1969 named for the elf.
- Gorgoroth, a Norwegian black metal band, named after the dead plateau of darkness in the land of Mordor.
- Iluvatar (band), a neo-prog band from Baltimore, US, took their name from Eru Iluvatar.
- Isengard, is a solo project of Fenriz, the drummer of Darkthrone, created in 1989.
- Marillion, a British rock band, formed in 1979, was named "The Silmarillion", but was shortened to Marillion in 1981 to avoid potential copyright conflicts.
- Minas Morgul, an album from the Austrian black metal band Summoning.
- Mithril, an American Celtic music quartet.
- Morgoth, was a German death metal band.
- Morgul, is a Norwegian symphonic black metal band formed in 1991.
- Radio Rivendell is a non-commercial, non-profit Internet radio station dedicated to playing fantasy music.
- Shadowfax, a new-age group, took its name from Gandalf the White's horse Shadowfax.

== Ships ==
- J.R. Tolkien, a gaff-topsail schooner of Netherlands registry used for passenger cruises on the Baltic Sea and elsewhere in European waters, was built in 1964, and renamed in honour of Tolkien in 1998.
- Loth Loriën, a barquentine active in the Baltic Sea of Germany and Denmark.

== Places ==
=== Streets ===
The "Tolkien Road" in Eastbourne, East Sussex, was named after Tolkien whereas the "Tolkien Way" in Stoke-on-Trent is named after Tolkien's eldest son, Fr. John Francis Tolkien, who was the priest in charge at the nearby Roman Catholic Church of Our Lady of the Angels and St. Peter in Chains. In the Hall Green and Moseley areas of Birmingham, parks and walkways are dedicated to J. R. R. Tolkien, especially at the Millstream Way and Moseley Bog. Collectively the parks are known as the Shire Country Park. In Weston-super-Mare, Somerset, England there is a collection of roads in the 'Weston Village' named after locales of Middle Earth, namely Hobbiton Road, Bree Close, Arnor Close, Rivendell, Westmarch Way and Buckland Green.

In the Dutch town of Geldrop, near Eindhoven, the streets of an entire new neighbourhood are named after Tolkien himself ("Laan van Tolkien") and some of the best-known characters from his books.

Two streets at Warsaw, Poland were named in 2022 after J.R.R. Tolkien and Gandalf. Both streets are located in the neighbourhood commonly called Mordor.

=== Housing ===
The Bend, Oregon housing development Forest Creek (formerly "The Shire") features the Tolkien-inspired names Ring Bearer Court, Shire Lane, and Wizard Lane. One of the student housing complexes at the University of California, Irvine is named Middle Earth; its halls and other facilities were selected from Tolkien's legendarium.

In the Silicon Valley towns of Saratoga and San Jose in California, there are two housing developments with street names drawn from Tolkien's works. About a dozen Tolkien-derived street names also appear scattered throughout the town of Lake Forest, California. The Columbia, Maryland, neighbourhood of Hobbit's Glen and its street names (including Rivendell Lane, Tooks Way, and Oakenshield Circle) come from Tolkien's works.

=== Pubs ===
The Hobbit in Southampton. It has been in a legal naming dispute with Middle-earth Enterprises because of the name.

== Taxonomy ==
It has been noted that "Tolkien has been accorded formal taxonomic commemoration like no other author." In the field of taxonomy, over 200 taxa (genera and species) have been given scientific names honouring, or deriving from, characters or other fictional elements from The Lord of the Rings, The Hobbit, and other works set in Middle-earth.

Several taxa have been named after the character Gollum (also known as Sméagol), as well as for various hobbits, the small humanlike creatures such as Bilbo and Frodo Baggins. Various elves, dwarves, and other creatures that appear in his writings. Tolkien himself has been honoured in the names of several species. In 1978, paleontologist Leigh Van Valen named over 20 taxa of extinct mammals after Tolkien lore in a single paper. The entomologist Karl-Johan Hedqvist, also a fan of Tolkien, named several wasp genera after Tolkien's characters. In 1999, entomologist Lauri Kaila described 46 new species of Elachista moths and named 38 of them after Tolkien mythology.

In 2004, the extinct hominid Homo floresiensis was described, and quickly earned the nickname "hobbit" due to its small size.

Pink background shading indicates that this species name has been synonymised and is no longer in use

=== J. R. R. Tolkien ===
Taxon	Type	Named for	Notes	Ref
Martesia tolkieni Kennedy, 1974	Clam	J. R. R. Tolkien	"The name tolkieni honors the late J.R.R. Tolkien, creator of The Hobbit, The Lord of the Rings, and many delightful creatures of long ago in the time of Middle-earth."	
Leucothoe tolkieni Vinogradov, 1990	Amphipod	J. R. R. Tolkien		
Gabrius tolkieni Schillhammer 1997	Beetle	J. R. R. Tolkien		
Tolkienia † Lieberman & Kloc, 1997	Trilobite	J. R. R. Tolkien	A genus of Devonian trilobites that has been found in Spain, France and the United States.	
Khamul tolkeini Gates, 2008	Wasp	J. R. R. Tolkien	"named in honor of J. R. R. Tolkein [sic] for his profound impact on the fantasy literature genre."	
Shireplitis tolkieni Fernández-Triana & Ward, 2013	Wasp	J. R. R. Tolkien		
Drassodella tolkieni Mbo et al, 2019	Spider	J. R. R. Tolkien	"Named after John Ronald Reuel Tolkien, who was born in Bloemfontein, Free State, South Africa on 3rd January 1892 and died on 2nd September 1973. He is internationally recognised for his authorship of The Hobbit, The Lord of the Rings and The Silmarillion, amongst other works. His fictional 'Middle Earth' is believed to have been inspired in part by the exceptional natural scenery of Hogsback, the type locality of this species."	
Hyloscirtus tolkieni Sánchez-Nivicela et al, 2023	Frog	J. R. R. Tolkien	"The specific epithet tolkieni is in honour of the writer, poet, philologist, and academic John Ronald Reuel Tolkien (J.R.R. Tolkien, 1892–1973), creator of Middle-earth and author of fantasy works like "The Hobbit" and "The Lord of the Rings". The amazing colours of the new species evoke the magnificent creatures that seem to only exist in fantasy worlds."; "In a stream in the forest there lived a Hyloscirtus. Not a nasty, dirty stream, with spoor of contamination and a muddy smell, nor yet a dry, bare, sandy stream with nothing in it to perch on or to eat: it was a Hyloscirtus-stream, and that means environmental quality."	

=== Ainur ===
Taxon	Type	Named for	Notes	Ref
Macropsidius sauroni (Hamilton, 1972)	Leafhopper	Sauron		
Balrogia Hedqvist, 1977	Wasp	Balrogs	"The new genus is named after a monster called Balrog in Tolkin's book 'The Lord of the Rings'."	
Mimatuta morgoth † Van Valen, 1978	Fossil mammal	Morgoth	"Fëanor's name for Melkor, the power-lustful Vala of The Silmarillion. Reference is to the Hell Creek Formation."	
Mithrandir † Van Valen, 1978	Fossil mammal	Gandalf (Mithrandir)	"Mithrandir (Sindarin, gray wanderer), Elvish name for Olorin, wisest of the Istari in The Lord of the Rings. Reference is to the subtleness of the differences between the subgenera."	
Niphredil radagasti † Van Valen, 1978	Fossil mammal	Radagast	"Radagast, naturalist of the Istari in The Lord of the Rings."	
Helferella gothmogoides Williams & Weir, 1988	Beetle	Gothmog, Lord of the Balrogs	"The species name is derived from Gothmog, a commander within the evil host of Mordor, and oides, latin suffix signifying 'resembling'."	
Macrostyphlus gandalf Morrone, 1994	Beetle	Gandalf		
Semicytherura balrogi Brouwers, 1994	Ostracod	Balrogs	"After the Balrog, an evil character in J.R.R. Tolkien's adventures of Middle Earth"	
Semicytherura tauronae Brouwers, 1994	Ostracod	Oromë (Tauron)	"After Tauron, a character in J.R.R. Tolkien's adventures of Middle Earth."	
Sauron Eskov, 1995	Spider	Sauron	The zoologist Kirill Eskov, author of The Last Ringbearer, a retelling of The Lord of the Rings from Mordor's point of view, has named a genus of linyphiid sheet weaver spiders Sauron after the ruler of Mordor.	
Elachista olorinella Kaila, 1999	Moth	Gandalf (Olórin)	From Gandalf's alternate name Olórin	
Elachista tauronella Kaila, 1999	Moth	Oromë (Tauron)		
Paraortygoides radagasti † Dyke & Gulas, 2002	Bird	Radagast	"For the wizard of Middle Earth, Radagast the Brown, rabid communicator with birds"	
Gandalfia Willems et al., 2005	Flatworm	Gandalf		
Litoria sauroni Richards & Oliver, 2006	Frog	Sauron	"From the character Sauron, referred to as 'the eye' in Tolkien's 'The Lord of the Rings', in reference to the striking red and black mottled eye of this taxon."	
Gandalfus McLay, 2007	Crab	Gandalf	"Gandalfus is derived from the name of the omnipotent 'Gandalf', a character in J. R. Tolkien's 'Lord of the Rings', which was made into a film by Peter Jackson, in New Zealand, the home of the type species."	
Khamul gothmogi Gates, 2008	Wasp	Gothmog, Lord of the Balrogs	"named in honor of Gothmog, Lord of the Balrogs, High Captain of Angband"	
Liolaemus tulkas Quinteros et al., 2008	Lizard	Tulkas	"In the mythology of J.R.R. Tolkien, 'Tulkas' is one of the ainur or powers that helped shape arda or middle earth. One of the characteristics of Tulkas is that of running faster than any other creature. Liolaemus tulkas is very fast in short sprints."	
Sauroniops † Cau et al., 2012	Dinosaur	Sauron	"The genus name is formed by Sauron, fictional character created by J.R.R. Tolkien (1892—1973), and όψη, Greek, 'eye'."	
Yavanna † Vera, 2013	Tree fern	Yavanna	"The generic name is proposed after Yavanna, fictional character of The Silmarillion written by J.R.R. Tolkien. In Tolkien's writings, Yavanna is a godlike entity (an Ainur), creator of the plants and animals that inhabit the Middle Earth."	
Anthracosuchus balrogus † Hastings et al., 2014	Crocodyliform	Balrogs	"The specific term, balrogus, is named from a literary beast discovered within a deep mine, originally written by Tolkien"	
Balroglanis Grant, 2015	Fish	Balrogs	Named after the Balrogs, referring to their larger size compared to Duringlanis and the “horns” of their nuchal shield. Now revised to Centromochlus Kner, 1858	
Sauronglanis Grant, 2015	Fish	Sauron	Now revised to Centromochlus Kner, 1858	
Terataner balrog Hita García, 2017	Ant	Balrogs	For the animal's "dark" lifestyle as a predator, and for its robustly armoured and horned body	
Lepanus sauroni Gunter & Weir, 2019	Beetle	Sauron	"This species is named sauroni for the distinctive pygidial depression with elongate turbercle that resembles the Eye of Sauron from Peter Jackson's film adaptation of The Lord of the Rings."	
Baalrog Monjaraz-Ruedas, Prendini & Francke, 2019	Schizomid	Balrogs	"The genus name is a compound word derived from two different words. Baal is a Mayan [sic, actually Hebrew] word for "devil." "Balrogs" are fictitious demons from the "Legendarium" and "The Lord of the Rings" by J.R.R. Tolkien."	
Orome † Bauzá, Gelfo & López, 2019	Fossil mammal	Oromë	A genus of fossil Notoungulates from the Eocene of Argentina.	
Chespiritos balrogiformis Kuwahara & Marshall, 2020	Fly	Balrogs	"This name refers to the fifth sternite, which resembles the head of the Balrog from J.R.R. Tolkien's The Lord of The Rings series, specifically the one represented in Peter Jackson's movie Lord of the Rings: The Fellowship of the Ring."	
Libitia gandalf Medrano, de Ázara & Kury, 2020	Harvestman	Gandalf	"Noun in apposition from the fictional character Gandalf the White, one of the protagonists in J.R.R. Tolkien's novels The Hobbit and The Lord of the Rings. Blot pattern of dorsal scutum resembles the white beard of the character while smiling."	
Afrodrassex balrog Haddad & Booysen, 2022	Spider	Balrogs	"In Peter Jackson's movies based on the books, the Balrog is depicted as wielding a long whip of fire, reminiscent of the very long embolus of this species."	
Austrosphecodes balrog Gonçalves & Pereira, 2022	Bee	Balrogs	"A tall and menacing being who can shroud itself in fire, darkness, and shadow, created by J. R. R. Tolkien."	
Asclepias sauronii M.G.Chávez & L.O.Alvarado	Milkweed	Sauron	"The name of the new species refers to the fictional character Sauron, the main antagonist of J. R. R. Tolkien's "The Lord of the Rings", due to the color of the plant with gray tones in the leaves and red tones in the flowers, as well as the presence of the elongated corona that resembles the helmet of Sauron in the Lord of the Rings movies."	
Saurona Huertas & Willmott, 2023	Butterfly	Sauron	"The generic name is based on that of the main antagonist, Sauron, in J. R. R. Tolkien's novel 'The Lord of the Rings'. The name alludes to the distinctive fused orange rings that encircle the VHW ocelli."	
Urostephanus balrog Gonz.-Martínez, Lozada-Pérez & L.O.Alvarado	Milkvine	Balrogs	"The specific epithet refers to the balrog, a fantasy creature from the literature of J. R. R. Tolkien. The interstaminal corona of the new species has lobes that resemble the horns of the balrog." Originally named Matelea balrog and subsequently transferred to genus Urostephanus.	
Myloplus sauron Pereira et al., 2024	Fish	Sauron	"The specific name sauron alludes to the Eye of Sauron, from J. R. R. Tolkien's "The Lord of the Rings". The elliptical body of Myloplus sauron, marked with a vertical, black bar tapering toward both ends, resembles the famous vertical-pupilled eye from the novel."	
Dolichopoda balrogi Kalaentzis & Alexiou, 2026	Cricket	Balrogs	"The name refers not only to its dark underground habitat, but also to the circumstances of its discovery: like the Balrog of Moria, the cricket was revealed only after humans excavated deep into the rock and created the tunnel in which it was found."	

=== Elves ===
Taxon	Type	Named for	Notes	Ref
Gildoria Hedqvist, 1974	Wasp	Gildor Inglorion	"Named after an eIf-leader in Tolkien: 'The Lord of the Rings'."	
Legolasia Hedqvist, 1974	Wasp	Legolas	Now revised to Chlorocytus.	
Oxyprimus galadrielae † Van Valen, 1978	Fossil mammal	Galadriel	"Galadriel- (Sindarin [Elvish], radiantly garlanded woman), wise elf-queen of The Lord of the Rings and The Silmarillion."	
Tinuviel † Van Valen, 1978	Fossil mammal	Lúthien (Tinúviel)	"Sindarin [Elvish] tinúviel, daughter of twilight, or nightingale, Beren's name for Lúthien in The Silmarillion'"	
Metapheretima elrondi Easton, 1979	Earthworm	Elrond		
Feanora De Clerck & Schockaert, 1995	Flatworm	Fëanor	"the genus name is a derivation of a mythological personage from Tolkien's 'Silmarillion'"	
Elachista lomionella Kaila, 1997	Moth	Maeglin (Lómion)		
Elachista amrodella Kaila, 1999	Moth	Amrod		
Elachista aredhella Kaila, 1999	Moth	Aredhel		
Elachista caranthirella Kaila, 1999	Moth	Caranthir		
Elachista celegormella Kaila, 1999	Moth	Celegorm		
Elachista curufinella Kaila, 1999	Moth	Curufin		
Elachista daeronella Kaila, 1999	Moth	Daeron		
Elachista finarfinella Kaila, 1999	Moth	Finarfin		
Elachista galadella Kaila, 1999	Moth	Galadhrim, the Silvan Elves		
Elachista gildorella Kaila, 1999	Moth	Gildor Inglorion		
Elachista guilinella Kaila, 1999	Moth	Guilin		
Elachista indisella Kaila, 1999	Moth	Indis		
Elachista maglorella Kaila, 1999	Moth	Maglor		
Elachista miriella Kaila, 1999	Moth	Míriel Serindë		
Elachista serindella Kaila, 1999	Moth	Míriel Serindë		
Elachista telerella Kaila, 1999	Moth	Teleri		
Elachista turgonella Kaila, 1999	Moth	Turgon		
Gallogramma galadrieli † Garrouste et al, 2017	Prehistoric insect	Galadriel		
Pseudophallus galadrielae Dallevo-Gomes, Mattox, & Toledo-Piza, 2020	Pipefish	Galadriel	"The epithet galadrielae refers to the character Galadriel in the trilogy 'The Lord of the Rings' by J. R. R. Tolkien. The elf ruler of Lothlórien is bearer of the ring Nenya, also known as the ring of water. It is used herein in reference to the additional bony rings diagnostic of the new species and its association with freshwater habitats."	

=== Dwarves ===
Taxon	Type	Named for	Notes	Ref
Balinia Hedqvist, 1978	Wasp	Balin	"named after Balin, a dwarf in Tolkien's 'The Lord of the Rings'." Now revised to Acrias.	
Gimlia Hedqvist, 1978	Wasp	Gimli	"named after Gimli, a dwarf in Tolkien's book 'The Lord of the Rings'." Now revised to Allocerastichus.	
Oinia Hedqvist, 1978	Wasp	Óin	"named after Oin, a dwarf in Tolkien's book 'The Lord of the Rings'." Now revised to Acrias.	
Bomburodon † (Van Valen, 1978)	Fossil mammal	Bombur	"Bombur, a fat dwarf in The Hobbit and The Lord of the Rings. Reference is to size and morphology." Formerly named Bomburia. (Note: Bomburia was already a genus of wasps named for the dwarf of Norse mythology)	
Deltatherium durini † Van Valen, 1978	Fossil mammal	Durin	"Name of many dwarf-kings in The Lord of the Rings; Durin I began Khazad-dûm. Allusion is to size."	
Metapheretima kilii Easton, 1979	Earthworm	Kíli		
Metapheretima dorii Easton, 1979	Earthworm	Dori		
Geocharidius gimlii Erwin, 1982	Ground beetle	Gimli	"Gimlii, after the dwarf Gimli, son of Gloin (one of the 12 companions of Thorin Oakenshield), who accompanied the Hobbit, Frodo, on his trip south, in Book I of The Lord of the Rings by Tolkien, in reference to the small size of these beetles."	
Elachista ibunella Kaila, 1999	Moth	Ibûn		
Elachista telcharella Kaila, 1999	Moth	Telchar		
Cacosternum thorini Conradie, 2014	Frog	Thorin Oakenshield	"The species name is derived from Thorin II Oakenshield, a fictional character in the J.R.R. Tolkien novel 'The Hobbit'. [...] It is widely known and accepted that Hogsback was the inspiration behind J.R.R. Tolkien's novels 'The Hobbit' and the 'Lord of the Rings' series. The name references its small size, its complicated call and the fact that it is found at the base of a large mountain in Hogsback."	
Geocharidius balini Sokolov & Kavanaugh, 2014	Ground beetle	Balin	The specific epithet is "based on the given name of the dwarf Balin, a refounder of the underground kingdom of Moria, one of Thorin Oakenshield's Company of Dwarves who had accompanied Bilbo Baggins on the Quest of Erebor"	
Gervasiella oakenshieldi Paladini & Cavichioli, 2015	True bug	Thorin Oakenshield	Named for the "fictional character surname of the novel The Hobbit, Thorin Oakenshield"	
Duringlanis Grant, 2015	Driftwood catfish	Durin the Deathless	Named for "Durin the Deathless, eldest of the Seven Fathers of the Dwarves in Tolkien’s “Lord of the Rings” legendarium, referring to small size of species in this subgenus."	
Nebela gimlii Singer et al, 2015	Testate amoeba	Gimli	"The name of this species refers to the name of Gimli, one of the dwarfs in J.R.R. Tolkien's masterpiece 'The Lord of the Rings', because of its small size (the smallest known member of the Nebela collaris complex) and stout shape. In addition, it has been found abundantly in a forest, and Gimli was unique among his kind to have been travelling in the woods."	
Aspidoras azaghal Tencatt et al, 2020	Catfish	Azaghâl	"Azaghâl was the king of the Broadbeam Dwarves, one of the seven dwarf clans, and Lord of the dwarven realm of Belegost in the Blue Mountains during Middle Earth's First Age. The name comes from a double allusion, first about the region where the species was found, Terra do Meio, freely translated as 'Middle Earth' in English, [the] name of the fictional world of Tolkien's legendarium, and second by the fact that the new species occurs in a mountainous region and presents a relatively small size, which are both typical features of the fictional dwarves."	
Spaeleoleptes gimli Pereira et al., 2024	Harvestman	Gimli	"Refers to the dwarf Gimli, one of the main characters from J.R.R. Tolkien's famous novel 'The Lord of the Rings'. This name was chosen because in Tolkien's novel the dwarves are a race associated with mining and have a strong admiration for caves. Particularly, Gimli explicitly expresses his fascination for the Glittering Caves of Aglarond with their extensive series of spectacular speleothems, and after the defeat of Sauron he was given the lordship over this marvelous cave. The intention of the specific name is to make a metaphorical association with the close relationship of this species with its subterranean habitat."	

=== Race of Men ===
Taxon	Type	Named for	Notes	Ref
Anisonchus eowynae † Van Valen, 1978	Fossil mammal	Éowyn	"Éowyn, woman of Rohan in The Lord of the Rings, who killed the chief of the Nazgûl and was cured of his poison by athelas." Now revised to Anisonchus athelas.	
Paradzickia morwen Blagoderov, 1998	Fungus gnat	Morwen		
Paradzickia hador Blagoderov, 1998	Fungus gnat	Hador		
Elachista aerinella Kaila, 1999	Moth	Aerin		
Elachista arthadella Kaila, 1999	Moth	Arthad		
Elachista beorella Kaila, 1999	Moth	Bëor		
Elachista bregorella Kaila, 1999	Moth	Bregor		
Elachista dagnirella Kaila, 1999	Moth	Dagnir		
Elachista eilinella Kaila, 1999	Moth	Eilinel		
Elachista gorlimella Kaila, 1999	Moth	Gorlim		
Elachista haldarella Kaila, 1999	Moth	Haldar		
Elachista marachella Kaila, 1999	Moth	Marach		
Elachista morwenella Kaila, 1999	Moth	Morwen		
Elachista neithanella Kaila, 1999	Moth	Túrin Turambar (Neithan)	Neithan is a pseudonym of Túrin.	
Elachista nienorella Kaila, 1999	Moth	Niënor		
Elachista ragnorella Kaila, 1999	Moth	Ragnor		
Elachista rianella Kaila, 1999	Moth	Rían		
Elachista tuorella Kaila, 1999	Moth	Tuor		
Elachista turinella Kaila, 1999	Moth	Túrin Turambar		
Idiopyrgus eowynae Salvador & Bichuette, 2024	Snail	Éowyn	"Éowyn exemplifies courage, resilience, and resistance against darkness, both internal and external, standing against Gríma Wormtongue and the Witch-king of Angmar."	
Colletes aragorn Kuhlmann, 2025	Bee	Aragorn	"The species is dedicated to the Ranger of the North, Aragorn II, a fictional character and protagonist in J.J.R. Tolkien's novel The Lord of the Rings."	

=== Hobbits ===
Taxon	Type	Named for	Notes	Ref
Gollum Compagno, 1973	Shark	Gollum		
Smeagolia (Hedqvist, 1973)	Wasp	Gollum (Sméagol)	Now revised to Muscidifurax.	
Pericompsus bilbo Erwin, 1974	Beetle	Bilbo Baggins	"These beetles are short and robust much like Bilbo."	
Gollumiella Hedqvist, 1978	Wasp	Gollum		
Smeagol Climo, 1980	Gastropod	Gollum (Sméagol)		
Syconycteris hobbit Ziegler, 1982	Bat	Hobbits		
Paragiopagurus hobbiti (Macpherson, 1983)	Hermit crab	Hobbits	"The name hobbiti is given in allusion to the famous fictional race of small creatures created by J. R. Tolkien (hobbits) which, like the new species, dwell in burrows."	
Gollumia Riedel, 1988	Snail	Gollum	"Nach Gollum (oder Smeagol) - ein Fabelwesen, Ausgeburt von J. R. R. TOLKIEN, geheimnisvolle und rätselhafte Kreatur, die in Dunkelheit, am liebsten unterirdisch lebte."	
Macrostyphlus bilbo Morrone, 1994	Beetle	Bilbo Baggins		
Macrostyphlus frodo Morrone, 1994	Beetle	Frodo Baggins		
Marjumia bagginsi † Melzak & Westrop, 1994	Trilobite	Bilbo Baggins		
Lotharingius frodoi † Mattioli, 1996	Coccolithophore	Frodo Baggins		
Frodospira † Wagner, 1999	Gastropod	Frodo Baggins		
Galaxias gollumoides McDowall & Chadderton, 1999	Ray-finned fish	Gollum	"The name is derived from "Gollum", a dark little fellow with big round eyes who sometimes frequents a swamp, a character in J R Tolkien's "The Hobbit" and "Lord of the Rings", hence gollumoides meaning Gollum-like"	
Breviceps bagginsi Minter, 2003	Frog	Bilbo Baggins		
Peperomia hobbitoides Wendt	Piperaceae	Hobbits	"Peperomia hobbitoides is a small and humble plant that lives in an almost fairyland-like environment of wet karst outcrops in rain forest, and it is strongly and faithfully tied to this home substrate. Indeed, it spends perhaps the greater part of the year in holes and depressions in the rock as a resting tuber. It is edible, an attribute of high esteem among hobbits."	
Gollumjapyx smeagol Sendra & Ortuño, 2006	Dipluran	Gollum (Sméagol)		
Ingerophrynus gollum Grismer, 2007	Toad	Gollum	"The specific epithet is a noun in apposition in reference to “Gollum”; a semiaquatic, large-headed, gracile-limbed fictional creature with a rasping cough who was created by J. R. R. Tolkien in The Hobbit (1937)."	
Laparocerus hobbit Machado, 2008	Beetle	Hobbits	"The specific epithet ... refers to the Hobbits ... a literary fictitious race of people who have big and hairy feet; a metaphor of the swollen and hairy tarsi characteristic of this species."	
Saurodocus hobbit Yerman & Krapp-Schickel, 2008	Amphipod	Hobbits	"Named after the fictional small people of 'halflings' in the fantasy novels written by J. R. R. Tolkien in the traditions of a fairy tale"	
Abacophrastus hobbit Will, 2011	Beetle	Hobbits	"an allusion to the setose dorsal surface of the tarsi, analogous to the hairy feet of Tolkien's Hobbits"	
Shireplitis bilboi Fernández-Triana & Ward, 2013	Wasp	Bilbo Baggins		
Shireplitis frodoi Fernández-Triana & Ward, 2013	Wasp	Frodo Baggins		
Shireplitis meriadoci Fernández-Triana & Ward, 2013	Wasp	Meriadoc Brandybuck		
Shireplitis peregrini Fernández-Triana & Ward, 2013	Wasp	Peregrin Took		
Shireplitis samwisei Fernández-Triana & Ward, 2013	Wasp	Samwise Gamgee		
Tennesseellum gollum Dupérré, 2013	Spider	Gollum	Named "on reference to the evil persona Gollum, given the 'evil look' of the male of this species due to the large cheliceral tubercles."	
Tetramorium gollum Hita Garcia & Fisher, 2014	Ant	Gollum	"The new species is named after the fictional character "Gollum" from J.R.R. Tolkien's novels 'The Hobbit' and 'The Lord of the Rings'."	
Tetramorium hobbit Hita Garcia & Fisher, 2014	Ant	Hobbits	"This very hairy new species is named after the fictional people from J.R.R. Tolkien's novels 'The Hobbit' and 'The Lord of the Rings'."	
Iandumoema smeagol Pinto-da-Rocha, Fonseca-Ferreira & Bichuette, 2015	Harvestman	Gollum (Sméagol)	"The specific epithet refers to the hobbit named Smeagol, created by J.R.R. Tolkien, being the original name of Gollum – the dweller of the caves located below the Misty Mountains of Middle-earth of the Lord of the Rings book." This is a blind species that lives in caves.	
Ansonia smeagol Davies et al, 2016	Toad	Gollum (Sméagol)	"The specific epithet is a noun in apposition in reference to ‘‘Sméagol’’, a fictional character created by J. R. R. Tolkien in The Hobbit (1937). Sméagol is an upland, semiaquatic, large-eyed, creature inhabiting the Misty Mountains of Middle Earth who has long, thin limbs bearing digits with bulbous tips, large webbed feet, and large protruding eyes—characters found in the new population being described herein."	
Meoneura hobbitoides (Stucke, 2016)	Fly	Hobbits		
Aglaophenia baggins Soto Ángel & Peña Cantero, 2017	Hydrozoan	Baggins family		
Meoneura bilboi Stuke & Freidberg, 2017	Fly	Bilbo Baggins	A tiny fly (length<2 mm) "dedicated to Bilbo Baggins [...] who, being an ordinary hobbit, found the ring of power in J.R.R. Tolkienʼs fantasy novel The Hobbit."	
Odontonia bagginsi de Gier & Fransen, 2018	Shrimp	Baggins family		
Aenigmachanna gollum Britz et al, 2019	Labyrinth fish	Gollum	"Named after Gollum, a character from J. R. R. Tolkien's books 'The Hobbit' and 'The Lord of the Rings', a creature that went underground and during its subterranean life changed its morphological features."	
Psylla frodobagginsi Martoni, 2019	Psyllid	Frodo Baggins	"The name was chosen due to the smaller size of this psyllid species, together with the fact it is native to New Zealand. The cinematographic sets for P. Jackson’s movie trilogy “The Lord of the Rings” were for the majority placed in the South Island, reflecting the proportional distribution of the psyllid’s endemic host Sophora microphylla."	
Goniurosaurus gollum Qi et al, 2020	Gecko	Gollum	"This new species and Gollum have similar cave-dwelling habit and emaciated body. We suggest the common name as 'Gollum Leopard Gecko'"	
Iandumoema gollum de Ázara, Hara & Ferreira, 2020	Harvestman	Gollum	"Noun in apposition from the fictional character Gollum created by J. R. R. Tolkien in the novels 'The Hobbit' and 'The Lord of the Rings'. Originally known as Smeagol, he was corrupted by the ring and the name Gollum is derived from the sound of his disgusting gurgling, choking cough. The name is also a reference to the similarity between I. smeagol and I. gollum, sp.nov."	
Zalmoxis bilbo Gainett, Willemart, Giribet & Sharma, 2020	Harvestman	Bilbo Baggins	"The name refers to J. R. R. Tolkien's character Bilbo Baggins, a big and hairy-footed hobbit that appears in a number of his novels, in reference to the swollen sexually dimorphic tarsus of this species."	
Sinopesa gollum Lin & Li, 2021	Spider	Gollum	"named after Gollum,[...] who lived in a cave, as does this new species"	
Chiloglanis frodobagginsi Schmidt, Friel, Bart & Pezold, 2023	Catfish	Frodo Baggins	"Chiloglanis frodobagginsi is named after another diminutive traveller, Frodo Baggins"	
Hobbitoblatta Lucañas, 2023	Cockroach	Hobbits		
Idiopyrgus meriadoci Salvador & Bichuette, 2024	Snail	Merry Brandybuck	"Besides standing with Éowyn against the Witch-king in the Battle of the Pelennor Fields, Merry is also an example of the fight for nature conservation in Middle-earth, pushing the Ents into action and ultimately ending Saruman's threat to Fangorn Forest."	
Epicratinus smeagol Gonçalves & Brescovit, 2024	Spider	Gollum (Sméagol)	"it has large eyes, which resemble the shape and position of the female's spermathecae."	

=== Orcs ===
Taxon	Type	Named for	Notes	Ref
Borophagus orc † Webb, 1969	Fossil mammal	Orcs	"Orc = a ruthless carnivorous creature serving the forces of evil in the Third Age of Middle Earth"	
Protungulatum gorgun † Van Valen, 1978	Fossil mammal	Orcs (Gorgûn)	"Etymology: Gorgûn, the Woses' name for orcs in The Lord of the Rings, with reference to the Cretaceous Hell Creek Formation"	

=== The Nazgûl ===
Taxon	Type	Named for	Notes	Ref
Nazgulia Hedqvist, 1973	Wasp	Nazgûl		
Khamul Gates, 2008	Wasp	Khamûl, a Nazgûl		
Tetramorium nazgul Hita Garcia & Fisher, 2012	Ant	Nazgûl		
Acledra nazgul Faúndez, Rider & Carvajal, 2016	True bug	Nazgûl	"After the fictional Nazgûl characters created by J.R.R. Tolkien, who, mounted on winged creatures, could fly long distances, even on steep peaks; on the other hand, this new species has a wide distribution and dispersal capacity throughout the highlands near the Argentinean Andes, which resembles the behaviour of the Nazgûl."	
Abavorana nazgul Quah et al, 2017	Frog	Nazgûl	Named "in reference to the 'Nazgûl', characters created by J.R.R. Tolkien in The Lord of the Rings (1954). Also known as Ring-wraiths, they were nine men who succumbed to Sauron's power and were transformed into white ghostly figures wearing black cloaks—the colouration that the new population being described herein shares."	
Potamalpheops nazgul Christodoulou, Iliffe & De Grave, 2019	True shrimp	Nazgûl	"Named after J.R.R. Tolkienʼs fictional characters, the Nazgul, who dwell in the realm of shadows, akin to the habitat of this new shrimp species"	
Mischocyttarus nazgul Borges & Silveira, 2019	Wasp	Nazgûl	"The specific epithet is a reference to the Nazgul Kings"	
Nazgultaure Lucañas, 2023	Cockroach	Nazgûl		

=== Ents ===
Taxon	Type	Named for	Notes	Ref
Entia Hedqvist (1974)	Wasp	Ents	Now revised to Boucekastichus.	
Fimbrethil † Van Valen, 1978	Fossil mammal	Fimbrethil, the lost wife of Treebeard	"Fimbrethil, entwife loved by Fangorn in The Lord of the Rings. Reference is to partly primate-like morphology and the disappearance of both Finbrethils." Now revised to Oxyacodon.	
Unicauda fimbrethilae Rosser, 2016	Myxozoan	Fimbrethil, the lost wife of Treebeard		

=== Other characters ===
Taxon	Type	Named for	Notes	Ref
Beorn † Cooper, 1964	Tardigrade	Beorn	Tardigrades or water bears are microscopic animals that look something like bears.	
Beornia Hedqvist, 1975	Wasp	Beorn		
Earendil † Van Valen, 1978	Fossil mammal	Eärendil, a Half-elf	"Eärendil, who (in The Silmarillion) sailed with a silmaril to get the aid that defeated Morgoth."	
Mimotricentes mirielae † Van Valen, 1978	Fossil mammal	Tar-Míriel, a queen of Númenor	"Míriel (Quenya, Jewel-woman), Númenorian queen in The Silmarillion, forced into marriage and the loss of her throne." Now revised to Loxolophus hyattianus.	
Protoselene bombadili † (Van Valen, 1978)	Fossil mammal	Tom Bombadil	"Tom Bombadil, the Hobbit name for a simple, powerful, and very old being. Reference is to these three traits."	
Elachista diorella Kaila, 1999	Moth	Dior Eluchíl, a Half-elf		
Ceraphron eaerendili Salden & Peters, 2023	Wasp	Eärendil, a Half-elf	"The species is named after Eärendil, a character of J.R.R. Tolkien’s mythology who carried a star across the sky. The light of Eärendil's star was content of the Phial of Galadriel, a gift to use in dark places from Galadriel to Frodo Baggins, which was essential for Frodo and Samwise Gamgee to escape from death. The light of Eärendil refers to the description of new species of a dark taxon, to shed light into the dark, and to the rather light coloured species."	

=== Animals ===
Taxon	Type	Named for	Notes	Ref
Ancalagon Conway Morris, 1977	Priapulid	Ancalagon the Black		
Ankalagon † (Van Valen, 1978)	Fossil mammal	Ancalagon the Black	"The mightiest dragon of Morgoth, in The Silmarillion."	
Claenodon mumak † Van Valen, 1978	Fossil mammal	Mûmak/Oliphaunt	"Mûmakil name used in Ithilien for the animal hobbits called an oliphaunt, resembling a large elephant. Reference is to size."	
Desmatoclaenus mearae † Van Valen, 1978	Fossil mammal	Mearas, the horses of Rohan	"Meara, any one of the great horses of Rohan in The Lord of the Rings."	
Gwaihiria Naumann, 1982	Wasp	Gwaihir, Lord of the Eagles		
Amphiledorus ungoliantae Pekár & Cardoso, 2005	Spider	Ungoliant	Ungoliant is a giant spider.	
Nemesia ungoliant Decae, Cardoso & Selden, 2007	Spider	Ungoliant		
Liolaemus smaug Abdala et al, 2010	Lizard	Smaug	"In Tolkien's mythology Smaug, the Golden, is the last of the Middle Earth dragons. The name Liolaemus smaug is because this new species exhibit a golden coloration on body."	
Smaug Stanley et al, 2011	Lizard	Smaug		
Tetramorium smaug Hita Garcia & Fisher, 2012	Ant	Smaug		
Pycnophyes smaug Sánchez et al, 2013	Kinorhynch	Smaug	"The species name smaug, refers to the dragon Smaug, the greatest and most powerful in the later part of the Third Age in the books of J.R.R. Tolkien."	
Glaurung † Bulanov & Sennikov, 2015	Weigeltisaurid	Glaurung		
Planois smaug Carvajal, Faúndez & Rider, 2015	True bug	Smaug		
Tamolia ancalagon Carvajal et al, 2015	True bug	Ancalagon the Black	Named "for Ancalagon the Black, the largest dragon in J. R. R. Tokien's universe; because of the dark coloration and aspect of this new species, as well as its size compared to many other heteropterans."	
Cristaphyes glaurung Sørensen & Grzelak, 2018	Kinorhynch	Glaurung		
Cristaphyes scatha Sørensen & Grzelak, 2018	Kinorhynch	Scatha the Worm		
Ochyrocera laracna Brescovit, Cizauskas & Mota, 2018	Spider	Shelob	"Laracna" is Shelob's name in Portuguese	
Ochyrocera ungoliant Brescovit, Cizauskas & Mota, 2018	Spider	Ungoliant		
Pycnophyes ancalagon Sørensen & Grzelak, 2018	Kinorhynch	Ancalagon the Black		
Rhabdias glaurungi Willkens et al., 2020	Roundworm	Glaurung	This species is named after the fictional character 'Glaurung', the first of the Dragons from 'The Silmarillion'	
Cnemaspis smaug Pal et al, 2021	Gecko	Smaug	"The species is named after "Smaug", the dragon from J. R. R. Tolkien's 1937 novel, The Hobbit. The name is derived from the old German verb 'smeuganan' meaning "to creep" or "to squeeze through a hole". The type specimens of this species were found within crevices of rocks and boulders inside the forest. Additionally, like dragons, the dorsum is armoured with large conical tubercles."	
Falciscaris mumakiana † Potin et al., 2025	Radiodont	Mûmak/Oliphaunt	"Mûmak (plural mûmakil) is a fantasy elephant-like animal from the Tolkien universe Lord of the Rings. They are described as giant animals and are depicted in the third part of the movie trilogy as having 4 long curved tusks equipped with spines, looking like the curved and spiny endite of Falciscaris mumakiana gen. et sp. nov."	

=== Objects and locations ===
Taxon	Type	Named for	Notes	Ref
Anisonchus athelas † Van Valen, 1978	Fossil mammal	Athelas, a plant	"Sindarin (Elvish) athelas, kingsfoil, a healing plant in The Lord of the Rings. Reference is to the joining of phylogenies."	
Earendil undomiel † Van Valen, 1978	Fossil mammal	Undómiel	"Quenya (Elvish) undómiel, evening star, which Eärendil with his silmaril became."	
Fimbrethil ambaronae † Van Valen, 1978	Fossil mammal	Fangorn (also named Ambaróna)	"Quenya (Elvish) Ambaróna, one of Fangorn's shorter names for his forest. Reference is to the dimness of the forest and of the affinities of this species." Now revised to Oxyacodon agapetillus.	
Litaletes ondolinde † Van Valen, 1978	Fossil mammal	Gondolin (also named Ondolindë)	"Quenya (elvish) ondo, rock, and lindë, song. Reference is to Rock Bench and to the hidden city Ondolindë or Gondolin of The Silmarillion. The Rock Bench specimens and others were formerly as hidden (and unsorted)."	
Niphredil † Van Valen, 1978	Fossil mammal	Niphredil, a flower	"Sindarin (Elvish) niphredil, white-flowering forb of open woods in Neldoreth and Lothlorien."	
Platymastus palantir † Van Valen, 1978	Fossil mammal	Palantir	"Quenya (Elvish) palantir, distant watcher, one of 7 globes made by Fëanor that gave visions through spacetime. Reference is to the long duration of the genus."	
Thangorodrim † Van Valen, 1978	Fossil mammal	Thangorodrim	"Thangorodrim, the mountainous triple fortress of Morgoth in The Silmarillion. Reference is to Purgatory Hill." Now revised to Oxyclaenus.	
Metapheretima andurili Easton, 1979	Earthworm	Andúril, sword reforged by Aragorn		
Metapheretima stingi Easton, 1979	Earthworm	Sting, Bilbo and Frodo's dagger		
Metapheretima orcrista Easton, 1979	Earthworm	Orcrist, Thorin Oakenshield's sword		
Metapheretima glamdringi Easton, 1979	Earthworm	Glamdring, Gandalf's sword		
Pseudopallenis palantir Kolibáč, 1997	Beetle	Palantir		
Asthenodipsas lasgalenensis Loredo et al, 2013	Snake	Mirkwood (also named Eryn Lasgalen)	"The specific epithet lasgalenensis is derived from the name Eryn Lasgalen which means in the "Wood of Greenleaves" in the fictional Sindarian language from J.R.R Tolkien's The Lord of the Rings (1955). It was the name used by the Wood Elves for the Mirkwood Forest after its cleansing following the War of the Ring. This name was chosen because Tolkien's (1955) description of this forest showed great similarity to the cloudy, upland forests within which this species is found."	
Shireplitis Fernández-Triana & Ward, 2013	Wasp	The Shire	"[T]he genus is endemic to New Zealand, where a human replicate of The Shire is built".	
Lopholatilus ereborensis † Carnevale & Godfrey, 2014	Tilefish	Erebor, the Lonely Mountain		
Desmia mordor Landry & Solis, 2016	Moth	Mordor	The specific name "means 'Black Land' in Sindarin, a fictional language used in The Lord of the Rings, the epic high-fantasy novel written by English author J. R. R. Tolkien [...] Mordor is volcanic and partly arid, like the Galápagos."	
Arctoceras erebori † Piazza, 2017	Ammonoid	Erebor, the Lonely Mountain		
Astyanax lorien Zanata, Burger & Camelier, 2018	Ray-finned fish	Lothlórien	lorien, from the Quenya language meaning "Dream Land", used in allusion to the "beautiful areas" inhabited by the Brazilian species	
Acantopsis bruinen Boyd et al., 2018	Ray-finned fish	River Bruinen, "Loudwater"	Specific epithet bruinen for the Loudwater of Rivendell and the flood that took the form of great horses, alluding to the common name "horseface loach" for the genus	
Cristaphyes dordaidelosensis Sørensen & Grzelak, 2018	Kinorhynch	Dor Daidelos	"The species name dordaidelosensis, meaning 'living in Dor Daidelos,' is inspired by the book Silmarillion by JRR Tolkien. According to the book, Dor Daidelos is 'The Region of Everlasting Cold' and the northernmost region of Middle Earth in the First Age."	
Hodor anduril Bonifácio & Menot, 2018	Scale worm	Andúril, sword reforged by Aragorn	"The species name is derived from the sword named '[A]ndúril' meaning 'Flame of the West' and belonging to Aragorn in the novel The [L]ord of the [R]ings by J. R. R. Tolkien. It refers to the sword-like modified neurochaetae present in this species."	
Uroplatus fangorn Ratsoavina et al, Scherz, 2020	Gecko	Fangorn	"The species epithet fangorn is [...] derived from the name of a deep, dark woodland in J.R.R. Tolkien's Middle Earth. [...] We use this name in reference not only to the similarities between Fangorn forest and the forests in which the new species occurs, but also to the tree-like appearance of Uroplatus geckos, which make them seem like the 'tree spirits' that are Tolkien's Ents (Flieger 2013)."	
Hyperlais orodruinella Korb, Gorbunov & Melyakh, 2023	Moth	Orodruin (Mount Doom)	"We name the new species after Mount Orodruin. In J.R.R. Tolkien's The Lord of the Rings, the One Ring was forged on Mount Orodruin by the Dark Lord Sauron. The name shows the characteristic feature of the moth: black triangular wings with a yellow suffusion in the basal part, resembling a dark volcano with an erupting top"	

=== Elvish words ===
Taxon	Type	Named for	Notes	Ref
Aletodon mellon † Van Valen, 1978	Fossil mammal	mellon	"Sindarin (Elvish) mellon, friend, the password of the west gate of Khazad-dûm in The Lord of the Rings. Reference is to similarly to P. palantir, presumptive diet of plants"	
Chriacus calenancus † Van Valen, 1978	Fossil mammal	calen, anca	"Sindarin (Elvish) calen, green; anca, Jaws. Reference is to inferred herbivory"	
Litomylus alphamon † Van Valen 1978	Fossil mammal	alph, amon	"Sindarin (Elvish) alph, swan, and amon, hill. Reference is to the locality" Now revised to Litocherus lacunatus.	
Mimatuta minuial † Van Valen, 1978	Fossil mammal	minuial	"Sindarin (Elvish) minuial, the time at dawn when the stars fade. Reference is to the dawn of the Cenozoic and the fading of the Mesozoic stars."	
Thangorodrim thalion † Van Valen, 1978	Fossil mammal	thalion	"Sindarin (Elvish) thalion, strong. Reference is to the massive morphology of the jaws and the generic name" Now revised to Oxyclaenus pugnax.	
Elachista aranella Kaila, 1999	Moth	aran-	"E. aranella seems to owe its name to aran-, the 'royal prefix used by the Kings of Arthedain after Malvegil and by the Chieftains of the Dúnedain of the North to indicate their claim to all of Arnor'".	
Helicops nentur Costa et al, 2016	Snake	nen, tur	"The name nentur is formed by the (Quenya) words nen (water) and tur (ruler, master)," referencing the aquatic habits of the species	
Hylaeus mellon Dathe and Proshchalykin, 2016	Bee	mellon	"mellon (High Elvish [Sindarin]): friend"	
Epimeria anguloce d'Acoz & Verheye, 2017	Amphipod	angulócë	"Angulócë, dragon — Tolkien's Quenya language (Faulskanger 2008). The name, which is a noun in apposition, alludes to the dragon-like facies of the species."	
Thiodina perian Bustamante & Ruiz, 2017	Jumping spider	perian	"The specific name is a noun in apposition taken from the fictional language Sindarin created by J.R.R. Tolkien. The Sindarin is one of the languages spoken by the Elves. The word 'perian' is translated as 'small' and was used to refer to the Hobbits, the smaller kind of Middle Earth; in reference to its small size, to date the smallest thiodinine ever discovered"	
Vanima Zacca, Casagrande & Mielke, 2020	Butterfly	vanima	In Quenya (elvish) vanima means beautiful	
Laurinque elenya Breedy et al, 2026	Coral	laurinquë, elenya	Laurinquë "meaning golden tree in the Elvish language, Quenya... in allusion to the bright yellow tree-like colonies. The golden octocoral gardens on fields of brittle stars evoke the mystic world of elves, where they spoke Quenya their ancient tongue." Elenya meaning "stellar, constellation, in allusion to the field of stars where the species was found."	

=== Other works ===
Taxon	Type	Named for	Notes	Ref
Aspidoras psammatides Britto, Lima & Santos, 2005	Catfish	Psamathos Psamathides, Roverandom	"Psammatides, after 'Psammatos psammatides' [sic], 'the sand sorcerer', a character of J.R.R. Tolkien's book 'Roverandom', from the Greek psammos, sand, and ides, son of. In allusion to the sand-dwelling behavior of the species."	

== See also ==
- Reception of J. R. R. Tolkien
- Works inspired by J. R. R. Tolkien
- List of organisms named after works of fiction
