= Oinia =

Oinia may refer to:

- Oinia, a genus of wasps in the family Eulophidae, synonym of Acrias
- Oinia, a genus of spiders in the family Linyphiidae, synonym of Eskovina
