= Khamul =

Khamul may refer to:

- Khamûl, a Nazgûl or Ringwraith, one of the fictional characters in the works of J. R. R. Tolkien
- Khamul (genus), a genus of wasps

== See also ==
- Kamul, a village in Ilam Province, Iran.
