= Entia =

Entia may refer to:

- Entia, a synonym for Boucekastichus, a genus of wasps
- Entia, a fictional planet in the novel Observation on the Spot by Stanisław Lem
- Entia the Shifter, an evil entity in Unicorns of Balinor series by Mary Stanton
- High Entia, race of avian people in the video game Xenoblade Chronicles
