= Mithril (disambiguation) =

Mithril is a fictional metal from J. R. R. Tolkien's Middle-earth fantasy writings.

Mithril or mythril may also refer to:

- Mythril, a metal in Terraria
- Mithril (band), a Celtic music / World music quartet
- Mithril (Full Metal Panic!), fictional paramilitary organization in Full Metal Panic! series
- Mithril Capital Management, founded by Peter Thiel
- Mithril, a metal in Runescape
- Mythril, a recurring fictional metal in the Final Fantasy series
