= Ancalagon =

Ancalagon may refer to:

- Ancalagon the Black, a dragon from the works of J.R.R. Tolkien
- Ancalagon minor, a fossil species of priapulid worms
- Ankalagon saurognathus, a Paleocene mesonychid mammal, originally named Ancalagon and later renamed
