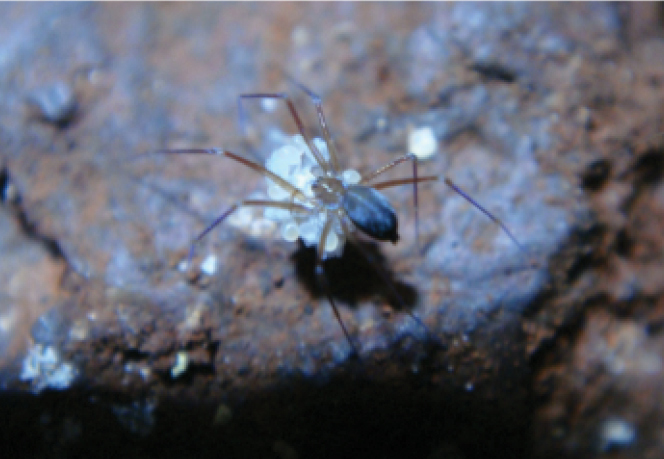
- Ochyrocera varys

Scientific classification
- Kingdom: Animalia
- Phylum: Arthropoda
- Subphylum: Chelicerata
- Class: Arachnida
- Order: Araneae
- Infraorder: Araneomorphae
- Family: Ochyroceratidae
- Genus: Ochyrocera; Simon, 1892

Type species
- O. arietina Simon, 1892

Species
- 56, see text

Synonyms
- Ceruleocera Marples, 1955

= Ochyrocera =

Genus of spiders

Ochyrocera is a genus of midget ground weavers that was first described by Eugène Louis Simon in 1892.

== Species ==
As of December 2021, it contains 56 species, found mostly in the Neotropical realm in the Caribbean, South America, Guatemala, Mexico, and on the Polynesian Islands:

- Ochyrocera aragogue Brescovit, Cizauskas & Mota, 2018 – Brazil
- Ochyrocera arietina Simon, 1892 (type) – Cuba, St. Vincent
- Ochyrocera atlachnacha Brescovit, Cizauskas & Mota, 2018 – Brazil
- Ochyrocera bicolor González-Sponga, 2001 – Venezuela
- Ochyrocera brumadinho Brescovit & Cizauskas, 2018 – Brazil
- Ochyrocera cachote Hormiga, Álvarez-Padilla & Benjamin, 2007 – Hispaniola
- Ochyrocera caeruleoamethystina Lopez & Lopez, 1997 – French Guiana
- Ochyrocera callaina Dupérré, 2015 – Ecuador
- Ochyrocera cashcatotoras Dupérré, 2015 – Ecuador
- Ochyrocera charlotte Brescovit, Cizauskas & Mota, 2018 – Brazil
- Ochyrocera chiapas Valdez-Mondragón, 2009 – Mexico
- Ochyrocera coerulea (Keyserling, 1891) – Brazil
- Ochyrocera coffeeicola González-Sponga, 2001 – Venezuela
- Ochyrocera cornuta Mello-Leitão, 1944 – Brazil
- Ochyrocera corozalensis González-Sponga, 2001 – Venezuela
- Ochyrocera diablo Pérez-González, Rubio & Ramírez, 2016 – Argentina
- Ochyrocera dorinha (Brescovit, Zampaulo, Pedroso & Cizauskas, 2021) – Brazil
- Ochyrocera fagei Brignoli, 1974 – Mexico
- Ochyrocera formosa Gertsch, 1973 – Guatemala
- Ochyrocera garayae Castanheira, Pérez-González, do Prado & Baptista, 2019 – Brazil
- Ochyrocera hamadryas Brignoli, 1978 – Brazil
- Ochyrocera ibitipoca Baptista, González & Tourinho, 2008 – Brazil
- Ochyrocera italoi Dupérré, 2015 – Ecuador
- Ochyrocera itatinga Castanheira, Pérez-González, do Prado & Baptista, 2019 – Brazil
- Ochyrocera janthinipes Simon, 1893 – Venezuela
- Ochyrocera jarocha Valdez-Mondragón, 2017 – Mexico
- Ochyrocera juquila Valdez-Mondragón, 2009 – Mexico
- Ochyrocera laracna Brescovit, Cizauskas & Mota, 2018 – Brazil
- Ochyrocera losrios Dupérré, 2015 – Ecuador
- Ochyrocera machadoi (Gertsch, 1977) – Mexico
- Ochyrocera magali (Brescovit, Zampaulo, Pedroso & Cizauskas, 2021) – Brazil
- Ochyrocera minima González-Sponga, 2001 – Venezuela
- Ochyrocera minotaure Dupérré, 2015 – Ecuador
- Ochyrocera misspider Brescovit, Cizauskas & Mota, 2018 – Brazil
- Ochyrocera monica (Brescovit, Zampaulo, Pedroso & Cizauskas, 2021) – Brazil
- Ochyrocera oblita Fage, 1912 – Venezuela
- Ochyrocera otonga Dupérré, 2015 – Ecuador
- Ochyrocera peruana Ribera, 1978 – Peru
- Ochyrocera pojoj Valdez-Mondragón, 2017 – Mexico
- Ochyrocera quinquevittata Simon, 1892 – St. Vincent
- Ochyrocera ransfordi (Marples, 1955) – Samoa
- Ochyrocera rinocerotos Dupérré, 2015 – Ecuador
- Ochyrocera ritxoco (Brescovit, Zampaulo & Cizauskas, 2021) – Brazil
- Ochyrocera ritxoo (Brescovit, Zampaulo & Cizauskas, 2021) – Brazil
- Ochyrocera rosinha (Brescovit, Zampaulo, Pedroso & Cizauskas, 2021) – Brazil
- Ochyrocera sandovalae Baert, 2014 – Ecuador
- Ochyrocera simoni O. Pickard-Cambridge, 1894 – Mexico
- Ochyrocera subparamera González-Sponga, 2001 – Venezuela
- Ochyrocera thibaudi Emerit & Lopez, 1985 – Lesser Antilles
- Ochyrocera tinocoi Castanheira, Pérez-González, do Prado & Baptista, 2019 – Brazil
- Ochyrocera ungoliant Brescovit, Cizauskas & Mota, 2018 – Brazil
- Ochyrocera varys Brescovit, Cizauskas & Mota, 2018 – Brazil
- Ochyrocera vesiculifera Simon, 1893 – Venezuela
- Ochyrocera viridissima Brignoli, 1974 – Brazil
- Ochyrocera zabaleta Dupérré, 2015 – Ecuador
- Ochyrocera zamora Baert, 2014 – Ecuador
