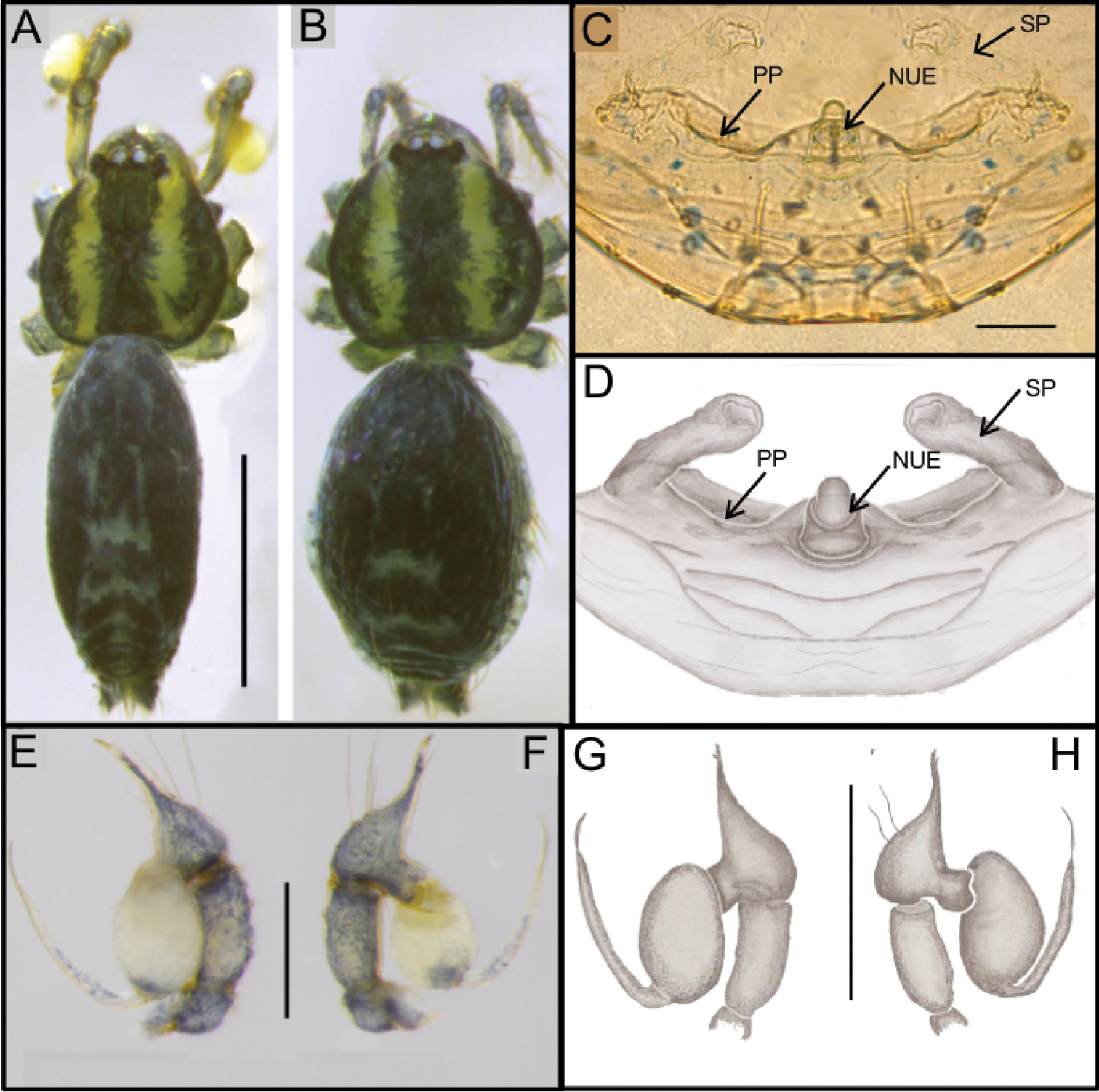

Scientific classification
- Kingdom: Animalia
- Phylum: Arthropoda
- Subphylum: Chelicerata
- Class: Arachnida
- Order: Araneae
- Infraorder: Araneomorphae
- Family: Ochyroceratidae
- Genus: Ochyrocera
- Species: O. ungoliant

Binomial name
- Ochyrocera ungoliant Brescovit, Cizauskas & Mota, 2018

= Ochyrocera ungoliant =

Species of spider

Ochyrocera ungoliant is a species of spiders of the family Ochyroceratidae. It is endemic to Brazil. It was named after Ungoliant, an evil spider spirit created by J.R.R. Tolkien, described in the book The Silmarillion.

== See also ==
- List of things named after J. R. R. Tolkien and his works
