= Tennesseellum formica =

Scientific classification
- Domain: Eukaryota
- Kingdom: Animalia
- Phylum: Arthropoda
- Subphylum: Chelicerata
- Class: Arachnida
- Order: Araneae
- Infraorder: Araneomorphae
- Family: Linyphiidae
- Genus: Tennesseellum
- Species: T. formica

Binomial name
- Tennesseellum formica (Emerton, 1882)

Synonyms
- Erigone formica Keyserling, 1886; Bathyphantes formica Emerton, 1882; Tennesseellum minutum Petrunkevitch, 1925; Prosopotheca transversa Crosby, 1905; Meioneta formica Chamberlin & Ivie, 1944

Species of spider

Tennesseellum formica is a spider in the family Linyphiidae. It is found in North America and the Marshall Islands.
