= Idiopyrgus souleyetianus =

Scientific classification
- Kingdom: Animalia
- Phylum: Mollusca
- Class: Gastropoda
- Subclass: Caenogastropoda
- Order: Littorinimorpha
- Family: Tomichiidae
- Genus: Idiopyrgus
- Species: I. souleyetianus

Binomial name
- Idiopyrgus souleyetianus Pilsbry, 1911

Synonyms
- Oncomelania brasiliensis Rey, 1959; Aquidauania brasiliensis (Rey, 1959); Hydracme rudolphi Haas, 1938

Species of gastropod

Idiopyrgus souleyetianus is a species of freshwater snail with gills and an operculum, an aquatic gastropod mollusc in the family Tomichiidae.

Idiopyrgus souleyetianus is the type species of the genus Idiopyrgus.

== Distribution ==
The distribution of Idiopyrgus souleyetianus includes Brazil.
