= Ochyrocera aragogue =

Scientific classification
- Kingdom: Animalia
- Phylum: Arthropoda
- Subphylum: Chelicerata
- Class: Arachnida
- Order: Araneae
- Infraorder: Araneomorphae
- Family: Ochyroceratidae
- Genus: Ochyrocera
- Species: O. aragogue

Binomial name
- Ochyrocera aragogue Brescovit, Cizauskas & Mota, 2018

Species of spider

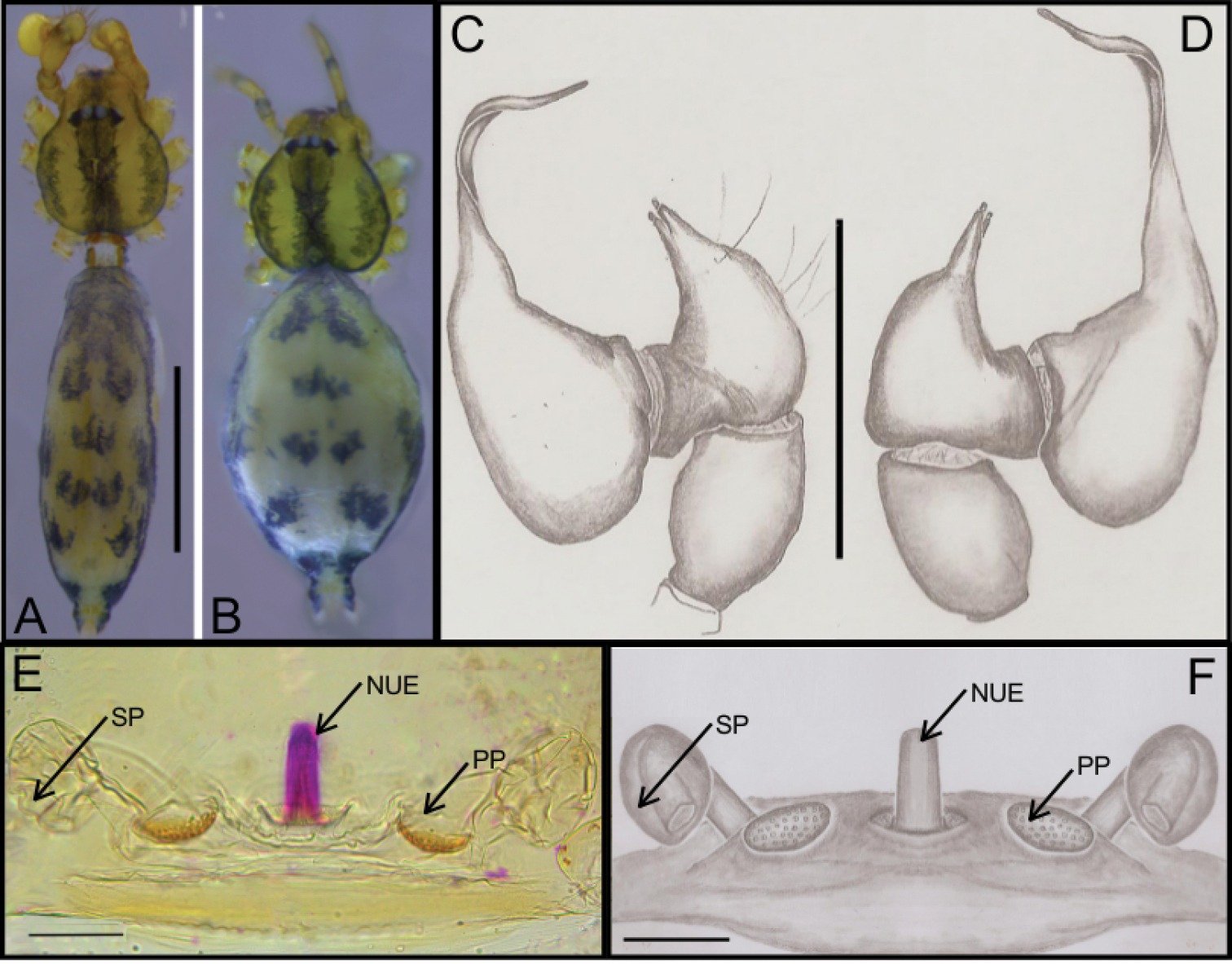

Ochyrocera aragogue is a species of spider of the family Ochyroceratidae. It is endemic to Brazil. It was named after the giant spider Aragog in Harry Potter and the Chamber of Secrets. It was discovered in the Carajás National Forest in Pará, Brazil.

== See also ==
- List of organisms named after the Harry Potter series
