= Tennesseellum =

Scientific classification
- Kingdom: Animalia
- Phylum: Arthropoda
- Subphylum: Chelicerata
- Class: Arachnida
- Order: Araneae
- Infraorder: Araneomorphae
- Family: Linyphiidae
- Genus: Tennesseellum; Petrunkevitch, 1925

Type species
- T. formica (Emerton, 1882)

Species
- T. formica (Emerton, 1882) – North America. Introduced to Marshall Is.; T. gollum Dupérré, 2013 – USA

Genus of spiders

Tennesseellum is a genus of sheet weavers that was first described by Alexander Ivanovitch Petrunkevitch in 1925. As of May 2019 it contains only two species, both found in North America, the United States, and on the Marshall Islands: T. formica and T. gollum.
