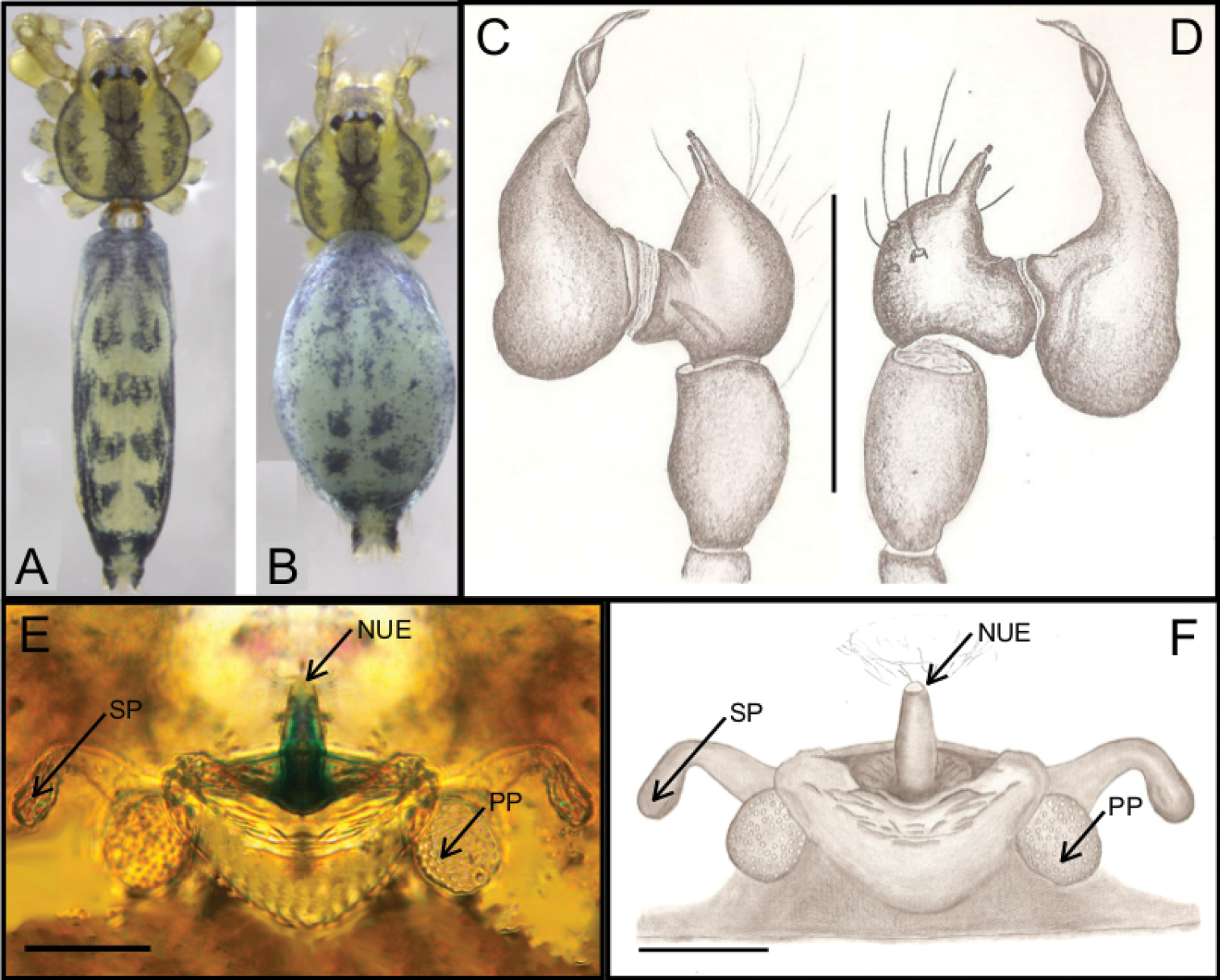
- Ochyrocera laracna spider, male holotype (A, C–D), female paratype, IBSP 191335 (B, E–F) A–B habitus, dorsal view C left male palp, retrolateral view D same, prolateral view E genitalia, enzyme cleared, dorsal view F same, dorsal view. Abbreviations: NUE = neck of uterus externus, PP = pore-plate, SP = spermathecae. Scale bars: 0.5 mm (A, B); 0.7 mm (C, D); 500 µm (E, F).

Scientific classification
- Kingdom: Animalia
- Phylum: Arthropoda
- Subphylum: Chelicerata
- Class: Arachnida
- Order: Araneae
- Infraorder: Araneomorphae
- Family: Ochyroceratidae
- Genus: Ochyrocera
- Species: O. laracna

Binomial name
- Ochyrocera laracna Brescovit, Cizauskas & Mota, 2018

= Ochyrocera laracna =

Species of spider

Ochyrocera laracna is a species of spiders of the family Ochyroceratidae. It is endemic to Brazil. It was named after Shelob (Laracna in Portuguese), giant spider from J.R.R. Tolkien's The Lord of the Rings.

== See also ==
- List of things named after J. R. R. Tolkien and his works
