= Elachista arthadella =

Scientific classification
- Kingdom: Animalia
- Phylum: Arthropoda
- Class: Insecta
- Order: Lepidoptera
- Family: Elachistidae
- Genus: Elachista
- Species: E. arthadella

Binomial name
- Elachista arthadella Kaila, 1999

Species of moth

Elachista arthadella is a moth of the family Elachistidae first described by Lauri Kaila in 1999. It is found in the United States, where it has been recorded from Oregon.
