= Elachista aranella =

Scientific classification
- Kingdom: Animalia
- Phylum: Arthropoda
- Class: Insecta
- Order: Lepidoptera
- Family: Elachistidae
- Genus: Elachista
- Species: E. aranella

Binomial name
- Elachista aranella Kaila, 1999

Species of moth

Elachista aranella is a moth of the family Elachistidae. It is found in Canada, where it has been recorded from Alberta.
