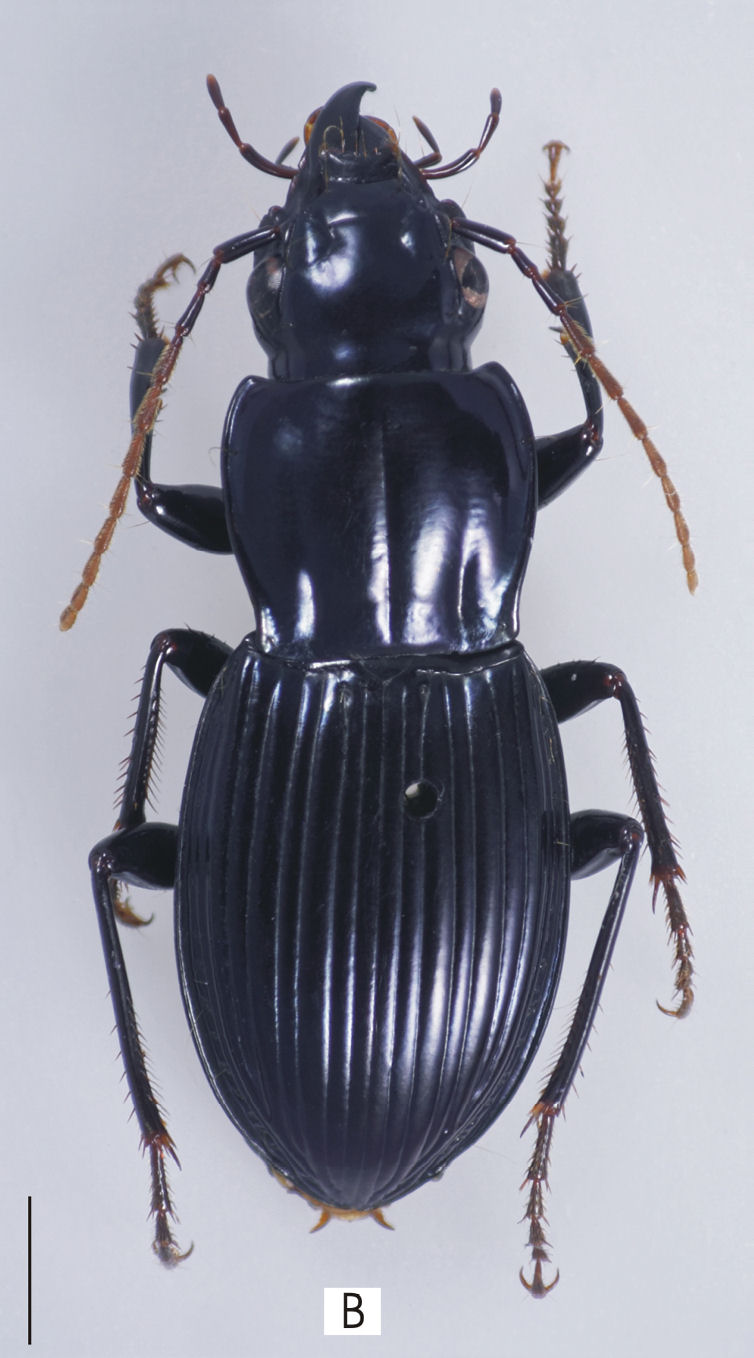
- Abacophrastus bellorum

Scientific classification
- Kingdom: Animalia
- Phylum: Arthropoda
- Class: Insecta
- Order: Coleoptera
- Suborder: Adephaga
- Family: Carabidae
- Subfamily: Pterostichinae
- Genus: Abacophrastus; Will, 2011

= Abacophrastus =

Genus of beetles

Abacophrastus is a genus of beetles in the family Carabidae, containing the following species:

- Abacophrastus bellorum Will, 2011
- Abacophrastus carnifex Will, 2011
- Abacophrastus chapes Will, 2011
- Abacophrastus hobbit Will, 2011
- Abacophrastus megalops Will, 2011
- Abacophrastus millei Will, 2011
- Abacophrastus reflexus Will, 2011
