= Elachista finarfinella =

Scientific classification
- Kingdom: Animalia
- Phylum: Arthropoda
- Class: Insecta
- Order: Lepidoptera
- Family: Elachistidae
- Genus: Elachista
- Species: E. finarfinella

Binomial name
- Elachista finarfinella Kaila, 1999

Species of moth

Elachista finarfinella is a moth in the family Elachistidae. It is found in the United States, where it has been recorded from California.
