= Cristaphyes =

Scientific classification
- Kingdom: Animalia
- Phylum: Kinorhyncha
- Class: Allomalorhagida
- Family: Pycnophyidae
- Genus: Cristaphyes; Sánchez, Yamasaki, Pardos, Sørensen & Martínez, 2016

Genus of small marine invertebrates

Cristaphyes is a genus of worms belonging to the family Pycnophyidae.

The genus has cosmopolitan distribution.

Species:

- Cristaphyes abyssorum (Adrianov & Maiorova, 2015) Sánchez, Yamasaki, Pardos, Sørensen & Martínez, 2016
- Cristaphyes anomalus (Lang, 1953) Sánchez, Yamasaki, Pardos, Sørensen & Martínez, 2016
- Cristaphyes arctous (Adrianov, 1999, 1999) Sánchez, Yamasaki, Pardos, Sørensen & Martínez, 2016
- Cristaphyes belizensis (Higgins, 1983) Sánchez, Yamasaki, Pardos, Sørensen & Martínez, 2016
- Cristaphyes carinatus (Zelinka, 1912) Sánchez, Yamasaki, Pardos, Sørensen & Martínez, 2016
- Cristaphyes chilensis (Lang, 1953) Sánchez, Yamasaki, Pardos, Sørensen & Martínez, 2016
- Cristaphyes chukchiensis (Higgins, 1991) Sánchez, Yamasaki, Pardos, Sørensen & Martínez, 2016
- Cristaphyes cornifrons Cepeda, Pardos & Sánchez, 2019
- Cristaphyes cristatus (Sánchez, Rho, Min, Kim & Sørensen, 2013) Sánchez, Yamasaki, Pardos, Sørensen & Martínez, 2016
- Cristaphyes cryopygus (Higgins & Kristensen, 1988) Sánchez, Yamasaki, Pardos, Sørensen & Martínez, 2016
- Cristaphyes dordaidelosensis Sørensen & Grzelak, 2018
- Cristaphyes fortis Cepeda, Álvarez-Castillo, Hermoso-Salazar, Sánchez, Gómez & Pardos, 2019
- Cristaphyes furugelmi (Adrianov, 1999, 1999) Sánchez, Yamasaki, Pardos, Sørensen & Martínez, 2016
- Cristaphyes glaurung Sørensen & Grzelak, 2018
- Cristaphyes harrisoni Pardos, Herranz & Sánchez, 2016
- Cristaphyes longicornis (Higgins, 1983) Sánchez, Yamasaki, Pardos, Sørensen & Martínez, 2016
- Cristaphyes nubilis (Sánchez, Pardos & Sørensen, 2014) Sánchez, Yamasaki, Pardos, Sørensen & Martínez, 2016
- Cristaphyes odhneri (Lang, 1949) Sánchez, Yamasaki, Pardos, Sørensen & Martínez, 2016
- Cristaphyes panamensis Pardos, Sánchez & Herranz, 2016
- Cristaphyes phyllotropis (Brown & Higgins, 1983) Sánchez, Yamasaki, Pardos, Sørensen & Martínez, 2016
- Cristaphyes rabaulensis (Adrianov, 1999, 1999) Sánchez, Yamasaki, Pardos, Sørensen & Martínez, 2016
- Cristaphyes retractilis Cepeda, Sánchez & Pardos, 2019
- Cristaphyes scatha Sørensen & Grzelak, 2018
- Cristaphyes spinosus (Lang, 1949) Sánchez, Yamasaki, Pardos, Sørensen & Martínez, 2016
- Cristaphyes yushini (Adrianov, 1989) Sánchez, Yamasaki, Pardos, Sørensen & Martínez, 2016
