= Tennesseellum gollum =

Scientific classification
- Domain: Eukaryota
- Kingdom: Animalia
- Phylum: Arthropoda
- Subphylum: Chelicerata
- Class: Arachnida
- Order: Araneae
- Infraorder: Araneomorphae
- Family: Linyphiidae
- Genus: Tennesseellum
- Species: T. gollum

Binomial name
- Tennesseellum gollum Dupérré, 2013

Species of spider

Tennesseellum gollum is a species of spider in the family Linyphiidae. The species is named after the fictional character Gollum from the works of J. R. R. Tolkien, in reference to "the 'evil look' of the male of this species due to the large cheliceral tubercles." Native to the Southwestern United States, it was described based on an individual collected in Anza-Borrego Desert State Park, Southern California.
