= Elachista morwenella =

Scientific classification
- Kingdom: Animalia
- Phylum: Arthropoda
- Clade: Pancrustacea
- Class: Insecta
- Order: Lepidoptera
- Family: Elachistidae
- Genus: Elachista
- Species: E. morwenella

Binomial name
- Elachista morwenella Kaila, 1999

Species of moth

Elachista morwenella is a moth of the family Elachistidae. It is found in Canada, where it has been recorded from British Columbia.
