= Elachista lomionella =

Scientific classification
- Domain: Eukaryota
- Kingdom: Animalia
- Phylum: Arthropoda
- Class: Insecta
- Order: Lepidoptera
- Family: Elachistidae
- Genus: Elachista
- Species: E. lomionella

Binomial name
- Elachista lomionella Kaila, 1997

Species of moth

Elachista lomionella is a moth of the family Elachistidae that is found in Massachusetts.
