= Allocerastichus =

Scientific classification
- Domain: Eukaryota
- Kingdom: Animalia
- Phylum: Arthropoda
- Class: Insecta
- Order: Hymenoptera
- Family: Eulophidae
- Subfamily: Entiinae
- Genus: Allocerastichus; Masi, 1924

Type species
- Allocerastichus doderi Masi, 1924

Species
- Allocerastichus afrimbiatus Shafee, Rizvi & Khan, 1988; Allocerastichus bicarinatus Coote, 1994; Allocerastichus doderi Masi, 1924; Allocerastichus fasciata Hedqvist, 1978; Allocerastichus longicorpus Khan & Shafee, 1985; Allocerastichus tricarinatus Coote, 1994; Allocerastichus versicolor Boucek, 1988; Allocerastichus verticillata (Erdos, 1954)

Synonyms
- Gimlia Hedqvist, 1978

Genus of wasps

Allocerastichus is a genus of hymenopteran insects of the family Eulophidae.
