= Kamul =

Kamul كمول
- Village
- Location within Iran
- Coordinates: 33°36′04″N 46°59′48″E
- Country: Iran
- Province: Ilam
- County: Chardavol
- Bakhsh: Zagros
- Rural District: Bijnavand

Population (2006)
  - Total: 229
- Time zone: UTC+3:30 (IRST)
  - Summer (DST): UTC+4:30 (IRDT)

Kamul (Persian: كمول, also Romanized as Kamūl; also known as Kamūl-e Karam Khānī and Karam Khānī) is a village in Bijnavand Rural District, in the Zagros District of Chardavol County, Ilam Province, Iran. At the 2006 census, its population was 229, in 44 families. The village is populated by Kurds.
