= Elachista miriella =

Scientific classification
- Kingdom: Animalia
- Phylum: Arthropoda
- Class: Insecta
- Order: Lepidoptera
- Family: Elachistidae
- Genus: Elachista
- Species: E. miriella

Binomial name
- Elachista miriella Kaila, 1999

Species of moth

Elachista miriella is a moth of the family Elachistidae. It is found in the United States, where it has been recorded from Colorado.
