= Geocharidius =

Scientific classification
- Domain: Eukaryota
- Kingdom: Animalia
- Phylum: Arthropoda
- Class: Insecta
- Order: Coleoptera
- Suborder: Adephaga
- Family: Carabidae
- Subfamily: Trechinae
- Tribe: Bembidiini
- Subtribe: Anillina
- Genus: Geocharidius; Jeannel, 1963

Genus of beetles

Geocharidius is a genus of ground beetles in the family Carabidae. There are about 18 described species in Geocharidius.

== Species ==
These 18 species belong to the genus Geocharidius:

- Geocharidius andersoni Sokolov & Kavanaugh, 2014
- Geocharidius antigua Sokolov & Kavanaugh, 2014
- Geocharidius balini Sokolov & Kavanaugh, 2014
- Geocharidius celaquensis Sokolov & Kavanaugh, 2014
- Geocharidius comayaguanus Sokolov & Kavanaugh, 2014
- Geocharidius disjunctus Sokolov & Kavanaugh, 2014
- Geocharidius erwini Sokolov & Kavanaugh, 2014
- Geocharidius gimlii Erwin, 1982
- Geocharidius integripennis (Bates, 1882)
- Geocharidius jalapensis Sokolov & Kavanaugh, 2014
- Geocharidius lencanus Sokolov & Kavanaugh, 2014
- Geocharidius longinoi Sokolov & Kavanaugh, 2014
- Geocharidius minimus Sokolov & Kavanaugh, 2014
- Geocharidius phineus Erwin, 1982
- Geocharidius romeoi Erwin, 1982
- Geocharidius tagliantii Erwin, 1982
- Geocharidius vignatagliantii Sokolov & Kavanaugh, 2014
- Geocharidius zullinii Vigna Taglianti, 1973
