= Eskovina =

Scientific classification
- Kingdom: Animalia
- Phylum: Arthropoda
- Subphylum: Chelicerata
- Class: Arachnida
- Order: Araneae
- Infraorder: Araneomorphae
- Family: Linyphiidae
- Genus: Eskovina; Kocak & Kemal, 2006
- Species: E. clava

Binomial name
- Eskovina clava (Zhu & Wen, 1980)

Genus of spiders

Eskovina is a monotypic genus of Asian dwarf spiders containing the single species, Eskovina clava. It was first described by A. O. Kocak & M. Kemal in 2006, and has only been found in China, Korea, and Russia.
