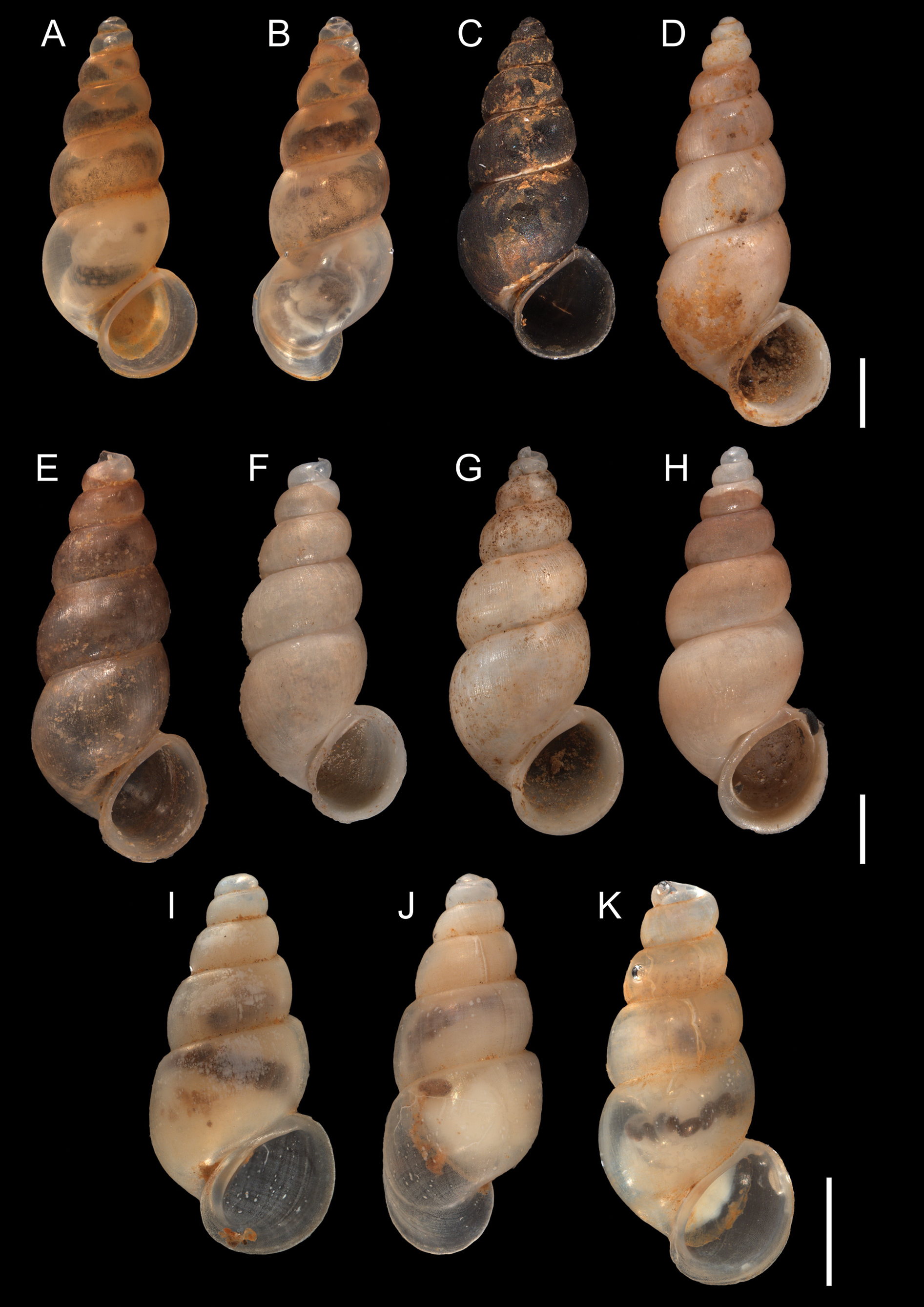
- Shells of Idiopyrgus spp. A, B. I. souleyetianus Pilsbry, 1911, holotype ANSP 100534; C, D. I. pilsbryi Baker, 1914, lectotype ANSP 130700; E. I. walkeri Pilsbry, 1924, reproduced from Pilsbry (1924: p. 6, fig. 9); F, G. I. rudolphi (Hass, 1938), holotype SMF 24365; H. I. brasiliensis (Rey, 1959), reproduced from Rey (1959: p. 145, fig. 2). Scale bars: 1 mm.

Scientific classification
- Kingdom: Animalia
- Phylum: Mollusca
- Class: Gastropoda
- Subclass: Caenogastropoda
- Order: Littorinimorpha
- Family: Tomichiidae
- Genus: Idiopyrgus; Pilsbry, 1911

Synonyms
- Aquidauania Davis, 1979; Hydracme Haas, 1938

= Idiopyrgus =

Genus of gastropods

Idiopyrgus is a genus of freshwater snails with gills and an operculum, aquatic gastropod mollusks in the family Tomichiidae.

== Distribution ==
The distribution of the genus Idiopyrgus includes Brazil.

== Species ==
Species within the genus Idiopyrgus include:

- Idiopyrgus adamanteus Salvador, Silva & Bichuette, 2022
- Idiopyrgus brasiliensis Rey, 1959
- Idiopyrgus eowynae Salvador & Bichuette, 2024
- Idiopyrgus meriadoci Salvador & Bichuette, 2024
- Idiopyrgus minor Salvador, Silva & Bichuette, 2022
- Idiopyrgus pilbryi F. Baker, 1913
- Idiopyrgus rudolphi F. Haas, 1938
- Idiopyrgus souleyetianus Pilsbry, 1911 - type species
- Idiopyrgus walkeri Pilsbry, 1924

Malek (1983) noted that Idiopyrgus pilbryi and Idiopyrgus walkeri were described from shells only, but should stay valid until the anatomy of the soft parts is also elucidated.
