= Elachista curufinella =

Scientific classification
- Kingdom: Animalia
- Phylum: Arthropoda
- Class: Insecta
- Order: Lepidoptera
- Family: Elachistidae
- Genus: Elachista
- Species: E. curufinella

Binomial name
- Elachista curufinella Kaila, 1999

Species of moth

Elachista curufinella is a moth of the family Elachistidae. It is found in Canada, where it has been recorded from Alberta.
