= Shireplitis =

Scientific classification
- Domain: Eukaryota
- Kingdom: Animalia
- Phylum: Arthropoda
- Class: Insecta
- Order: Hymenoptera
- Family: Braconidae
- Subfamily: Microgastrinae
- Genus: Shireplitis; Fernández-Triana & Ward, 2013

Type species
- Shireplitis bilboi Fernández-Triana & Ward, 2013

Genus of wasps

Shireplitis is a genus of braconid wasps native to New Zealand. Individuals range from 1.8 to 2.4 mm in body length. Five of the six known species occur on South Island, and one on the North Island. The genus name derives from the Shire, fictional home of the hobbits in the works of J. R. R. Tolkien, and five species are named after hobbits, with one species named after Tolkien himself.

== Description ==
Individuals are brown to black in color, and range from 1.8 to 2.4 mm in body length, with distinctly narrow fore wings. Species of Shireplitis differ from related genera in the subfamily Microgastrinae in having relatively shorter and stouter legs, shorter antennal segments in females, and sculpturing of the propodeum (first abdominal segment), and in the structure of the hypopygium, a modified 9th abdominal segment.

== Species ==
- Shireplitis bilboi, named after Bilbo Baggins, occurs on the South Island
- Shireplitis frodoi, named after Frodo Baggins, occurs on the South Island
- Shireplitis meriadoci, named after Meriadoc Brandybuck, occurs on the South Island
- Shireplitis peregrini, named after Peregrin Took, occurs on the South Island
- Shireplitis samwisei, named after Samwise Gamgee, occurs on the North Island
- Shireplitis tolkieni, named after J. R. R. Tolkien, occurs on the South Island
