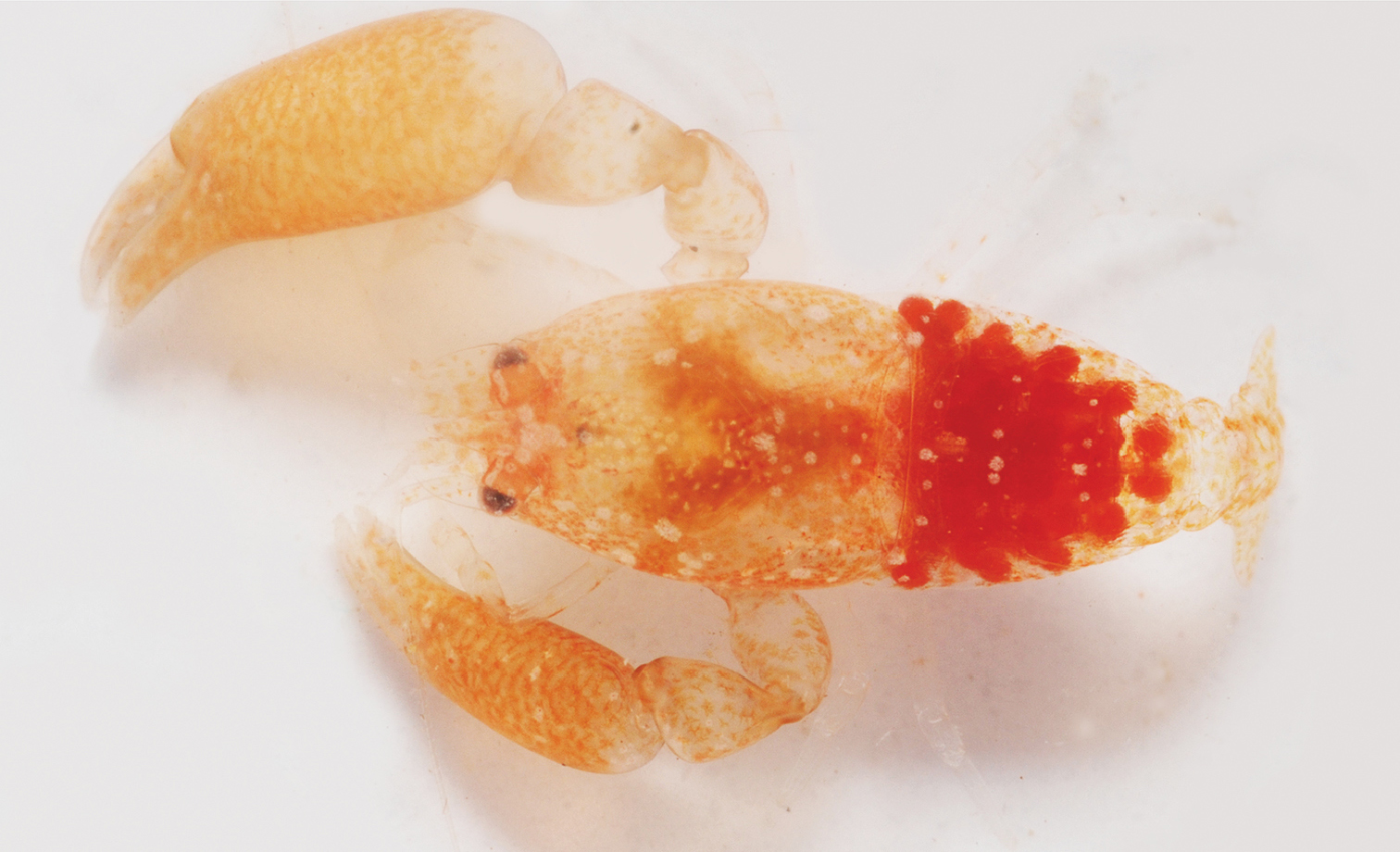

Scientific classification
- Domain: Eukaryota
- Kingdom: Animalia
- Phylum: Arthropoda
- Class: Malacostraca
- Order: Decapoda
- Suborder: Pleocyemata
- Infraorder: Caridea
- Family: Palaemonidae
- Genus: Odontonia
- Species: O. bagginsi

Binomial name
- Odontonia bagginsi de Gier & Fransen, 2018

= Odontonia bagginsi =

Species of crustacean

Odontonia bagginsi (more commonly known as Hobbit shrimp) is a tiny species of shrimp with eight hairy limbs. It was discovered in 2009 by Leiden University biology student Werner de Gier and shrimp researcher Dr. Charles Fransen in Ternate, Indonesia. The name came from the novel The Hobbit starring Bilbo Baggins as the fictional “hobbit” characters have hairy feet. Genetic characters of the shrimp were entered in the online database tree of life.
