= Duringlanis =

Scientific classification
- Kingdom: Animalia
- Phylum: Chordata
- Class: Actinopterygii
- Order: Siluriformes
- Family: Auchenipteridae
- Subfamily: Centromochlinae
- Genus: Duringlanis; Grant, 2015

Type species
- Centromochlus perugiae Steindachner, 1882

Genus of fishes

Duringlanis is a genus of fish in the family Auchenipteridae native to South America.

== Species ==
There are currently 4 recognized species in this genus:

- Duringlanis altae (Fowler, 1945)
- Duringlanis perugiae (Steindachner, 1882)
- Duringlanis romani (Mees, 1988)
- Duringlanis simplex (Mees, 1974)
