= Sauron (spider) =

Scientific classification
- Kingdom: Animalia
- Phylum: Arthropoda
- Subphylum: Chelicerata
- Class: Arachnida
- Order: Araneae
- Infraorder: Araneomorphae
- Family: Linyphiidae
- Genus: Sauron; Eskov, 1995

Type species
- S. fissocornis Eskov, 1995

Species
- S. fissocornis Eskov, 1995 – Russia, Kazakhstan; S. rayi (Simon, 1881) – Europe

Genus of spiders

Sauron is a genus of sheet weavers that was first described by K. Y. Eskov & Y. M. Marusik in 1995. They reach a body length of 1.25 to 2 millimetres (0.049 to 0.079 in). The genus name is derived from Sauron, a character in the books of J. R. R. Tolkien.

== Species ==
As of May 2019 it contains only two species, S. fissocornis and S. rayi. S. fissocornis was described from individuals collected in the Saur Mountains of Kazakhstan. S. rayi was originally described by Eugène Simon in 1881 as Erigone rayi, and occurs throughout Central and Eastern Europe from France to Russia.
