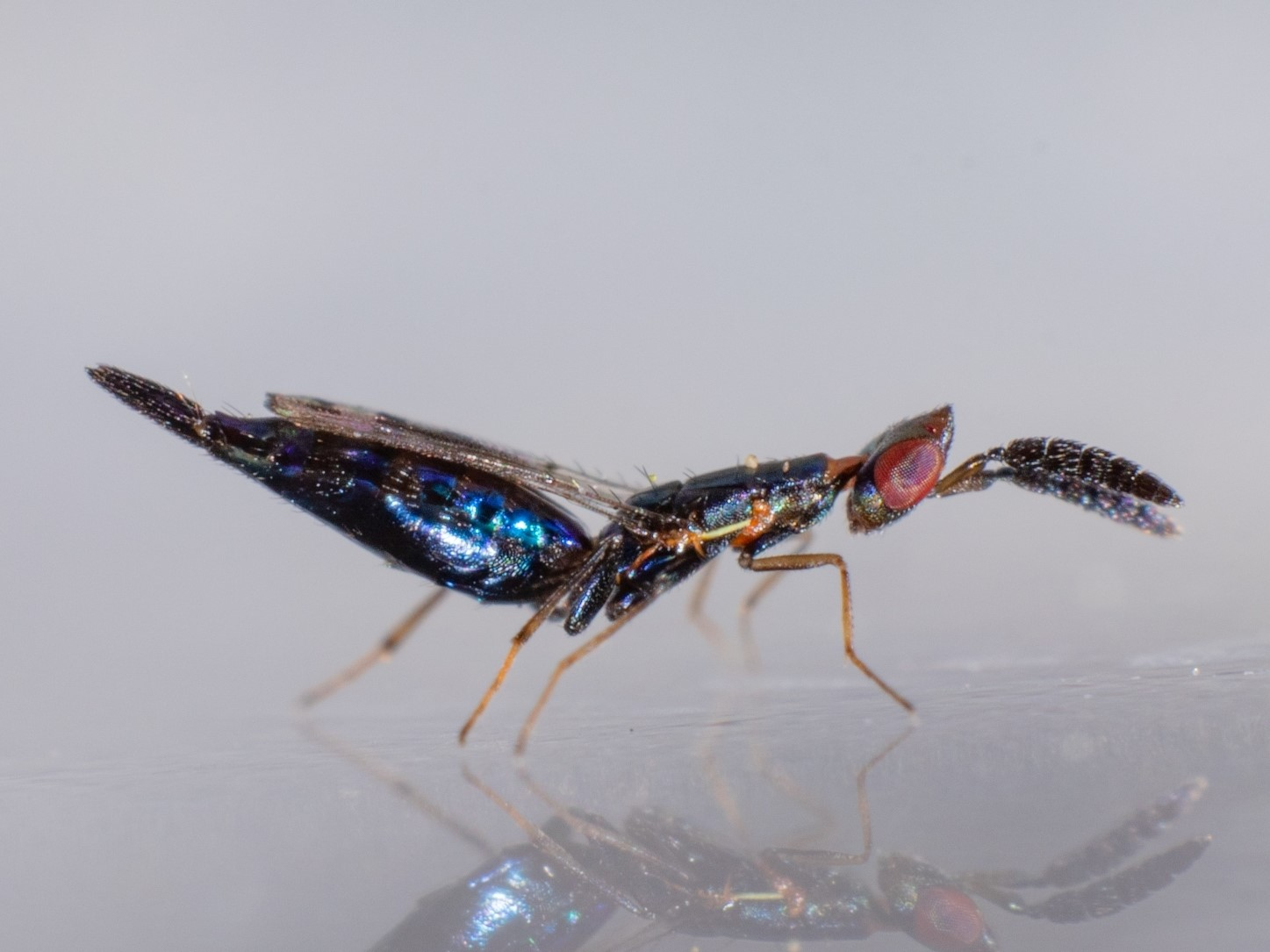
- Acrias nileus

Scientific classification
- Kingdom: Animalia
- Phylum: Arthropoda
- Class: Insecta
- Order: Hymenoptera
- Family: Eulophidae
- Subfamily: Entiinae
- Genus: Acrias; Walker, 1847

Type species
- Acrias nileus Walker, 1847

Species
- 11 species

Synonyms
- Balinia Hedqvist, 1978

= Acrias =

Genus of wasps

Acrias is a genus of hymenopteran insects of the family Eulophidae.
