= Khamul (wasp) =

Scientific classification
- Domain: Eukaryota
- Kingdom: Animalia
- Phylum: Arthropoda
- Class: Insecta
- Order: Hymenoptera
- Family: Eurytomidae
- Subfamily: Eurytominae
- Genus: Khamul; Gates, 2008

Type species
- Khamul erwini Gates, 2008

Species
- See text

Genus of wasps

Khamul is a genus of chalcid wasps known containing four species in Central and South America. The body and head is black, while the legs and antennae are brown individuals measure 3.3–5.3 mm (0.13–0.21 in) in body length.

The name Khamûl is taken from a villain in J.R.R. Tolkien's novel The Lord of the Rings.

== Species ==
- Khamul erwini (Note: named after entomologist Terry Erwin) is known from Costa Rica, Colombia, Ecuador and Brazil
- Khamul gothmogi (Note: named after the fictional demon Gothmog) is known from Ecuador and Peru
- Khamul lanceolatus (Note: named for the lance-like mandibles) is known from Costa Rica, Mexico, and Peru
- Khamul tolkeini (Note: named after author J. R. R. Tolkien) is known from Ecuador and Peru.
