= Boucekastichus =

Scientific classification
- Domain: Eukaryota
- Kingdom: Animalia
- Phylum: Arthropoda
- Class: Insecta
- Order: Hymenoptera
- Family: Eulophidae
- Subfamily: Entiinae
- Genus: Boucekastichus; Andriescu, 1971

Type species
- Boucekastichus homocerus Andriescu, 1971

Species
- Boucekastichus homocerus Andriescu, 1971; Boucekastichus leileri (Hedqvist, 1974)

Synonyms
- Entia Hedqvist (1974)

Genus of wasps

Boucekastichus is a genus of wasps in the family Eulophidae.
