= Mithril (band) =

Mithril was a Celtic music / World music quartet located in Mobile, Alabama in the southeastern United States. Active from 2000 to 2015, the group performed arrangements of traditional music from Celtic regions, the Middle East, and other parts of the world. During that time, the ensemble toured throughout the United States, performing at festivals, chamber concert series, with symphony orchestras, and in local pubs. The group released several recordings and was featured on radio programs focused on Celtic music and Folk music.

== The band ==
- Tom Morley (fiddle, bouzouki, mandolin, guitar)
- Andra Bohnet (Irish flute, penny whistle, fife, Celtic harp)
- Ben Harper (guitar, bass guitar, flute)
- David Hughes (bodhrán, djembe, doumbek, percussion, harmonium, melodica) (2000-2011)
- Sam Gaston (djembe, doumbek, percussion, melodica) (2011-2015)
- Andy Kruspe (bodhrán) (2011-2015)

== Discography ==
- Bottom of the Punch Bowl (2015) - Morley, Bohnet
- Along the Road (2012) - Morley, Bohnet, Harper, Gaston, Kruspe
- Tangled Up (2009) - Morley, Bohnet, Harper, Hughes
- The Return Home (2007) - Morley, Bohnet, Harper, Hughes
- Live in Concert (2005) - Morley, Bohnet, Harper, Hughes
- Winter's Day (2004) - Morley, Bohnet, Harper, Hughes
- Banish Misfortune (2002) - Morley, Bohnet, Harper, Hughes

== Additional information ==
- The band was named after Mithril, a fictional material from J. R. R. Tolkien's universe, Middle-earth.
- Green Linnet recording artist Manus McGuire says "Mithril's 'Live In Concert CD gives us a great insight into four musicians on top of their game. The group's classical music roots provide a lovely backdrop to the real traditional feel throughout the recording."
- Mithril was featured on the syndicated radio program Celtic Connections.
- Mithril's official website was www.mithril.us
- ''A life raft for our spirits' : Melody inspired by oil spill continues to evoke emotions for local musician
- David Hughes' newly titled oil spill tune recorded by Mithril, now available (free) online
- Mithril Performs Contemporary Celtic Music on March 6
- Mithril to perform tunes from new CD 'Tangled Up' in Laidlaw concerts
- UWA welcomes Celtic group Nov. 11

== See also ==
- Celtic music in the United States
