= Ancalagon the Black =

Fictitious dragon

Ancalagon
- The Silmarillion character
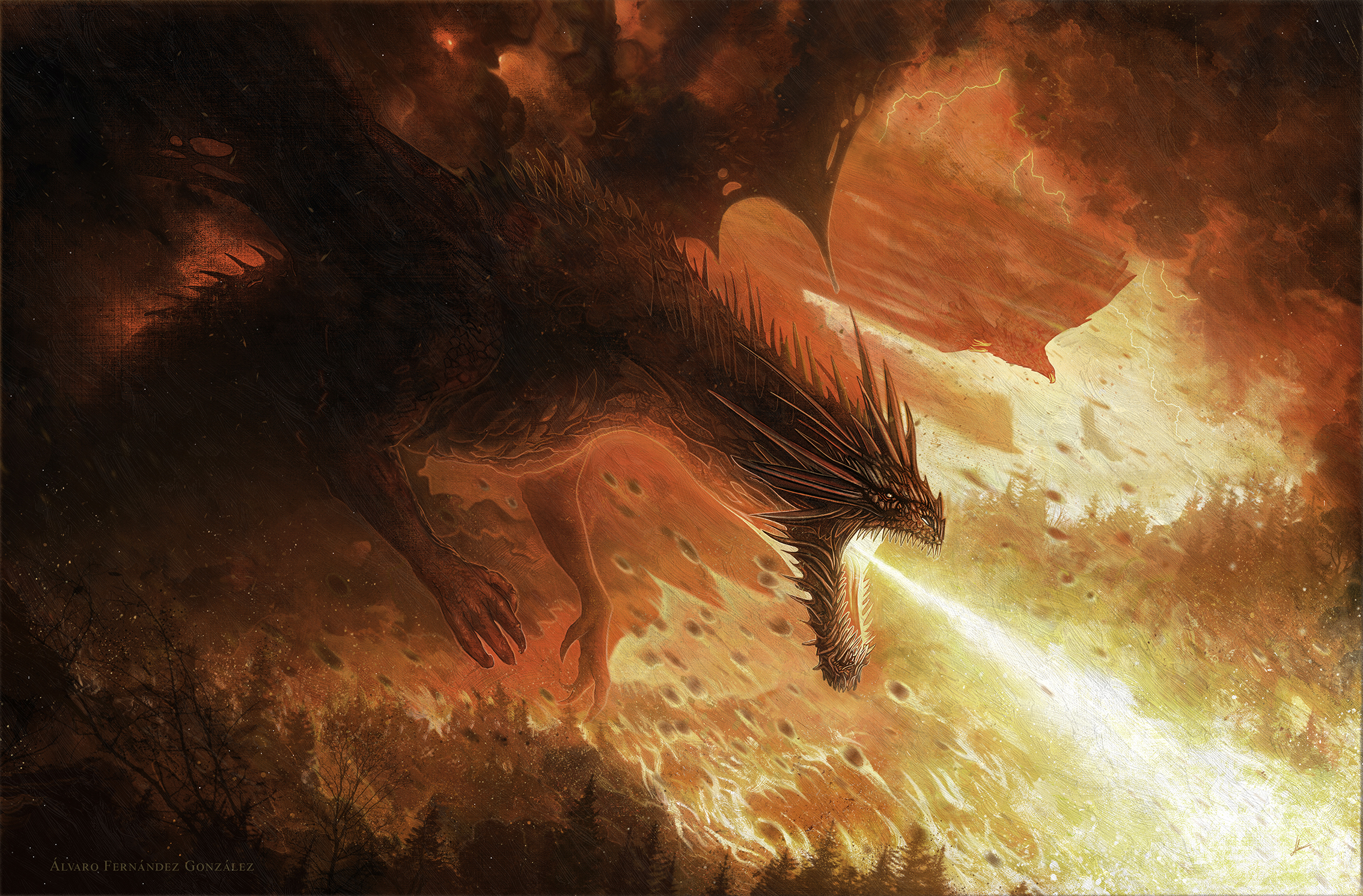
- Fan art representation of Ancalagon the Black
- Created by: J. R. R. Tolkien

In-universe information
- Alias: The Black
- Species: Dragon
- Gender: Male

Ancalagon, or Ancalagon the Black, is a dragon that appears in the legends of British writer J. R. R. Tolkien, and particularly in his novel The Silmarillion.

Bred by Morgoth in the depths of his fortress of Angband, Ancalagon is present at the last battle of the First Age, which sees the battle between the armies of the Valar and Morgoth to free Middle-earth from the latter's yoke. Morgoth, seeing his armies in disarray, unveils, as a last resort, the winged dragons led by Ancalagon the Black. Eärendil and Thorondor are confronted by Ancalagon in an aerial battle in which the dragon is shot down, bringing down the peaks of Thangorodrim and defeating its master.

The first flying dragon to appear in the story, it also marks a turning point in Tolkien's physical evolution of this species.

== Features ==
=== Names ===
The name "Ancalagon" is explained in The Lost Road and Other Writings as "impetuous jaws" or "biting storm", from Sindarin anc(a) "jaw, bite" and alag "impetuous" or alagos "windstorm". In his English-language version of the Quenta, Tolkien translates Ancalagon as Anddraca, from and-, an oppositional prefix, and draca "dragon". As with other names he has "translated" into Old English, Tolkien does not seek identity of meaning, but rather to achieve sounds close to those of the original names.

=== Description ===
The description of Ancalagon is kept to a minimum. Considered "the greatest of all dragons", he is the first of the winged dragons and, as his name suggests, is black in colour and has an impressive jaw. Despite his power, in The Lord of the Rings, Gandalf tells Frodo that Ancalagon would not have been able to destroy the One Ring:

It has been said that dragon-fire could melt and consume the Rings of Power, but there is not now any dragon left on earth in which the old fire is hot enough; nor was there ever any dragon, not even Ancalagon the Black, who could have harmed the One Ring, the Ruling Ring, for that was made by Sauron himself.

— Gandalf, in J.R.R. Tolkien, The Lord of the Rings, Vol. I: The Fellowship of the Ring, Book One, ch. II: "The Shadow of the Past", p. 70

== Fictional history ==
At the end of the First Age, in the year 587, a few years after the fall of Gondolin and the destruction of the kingdom of Doriath, Eärendil and Elwing set sail for Valinor to convince the Valar to save Middle-earth from the yoke of Morgoth. Thanks to their intervention, the armies of the Valar led by Eönwë, the herald of Manwë, Finarfin king of the Ñoldor of Aman, Ingwë king of the Vanyar, and Eärendil flying in Vingilot, march towards Thangorodrim, beneath which lies Morgoth's fortress, where they are joined by the armies of the Edain.

Morgoth brings most of his armies out of Angband, but they are quickly routed by the Valar forces. Sensing that victory was slipping from his grasp, he called in his reserve forces, the first winged dragons, led by Ancalagon the Black. The force of the attack was so powerful that "the armies of the Valar retreated before the thunder, lightning and hurricane of flames that preceded the dragons". However, Eärendil on his ship Vingilot, accompanied by Thorondor leading an armada of birds, battled Ancalagon, and the other dragons for "a whole day and night of doubt", before piercing their leader. Ancalagon, shot out of the sky, falls on the peaks of Thangorodrim, causing their destruction and ending the War of the Great Wrath. Angband is opened and Morgoth imprisoned by the Valar, sounding the end of the First Age of Middle-earth.

== Versions ==
Tolkien makes no mention of Ancalagon in the 1926 Sketch of Mythology and the first version of the Quenta in the 1930s. There is a draft of the attack of the flying dragons, but Ancalagon had not yet been conceived. Ancalagon appears in the second version of the Quenta, the role he will play in the rest of the legendarium. In this version, as well as in its later rewriting, the pre-1937 Quenta Silmarillion, Ancalagon has wings of steel.

In later versions, notably in the 1969 essay The Problem of Ros, Tolkien suggests that Ancalagon may have been felled by Túrin, who returned after its death from the outer void of Arda to fight in the Final Battle, according to a prophecy of Andreth. However, whether Tolkien is talking about the War of the Great Wrath (Christopher Tolkien's hypothesis) or the Dagor Dagorath, the battle that marks the end of the world (John D. Rateliff's hypothesis), is unknown.

== Analysis ==
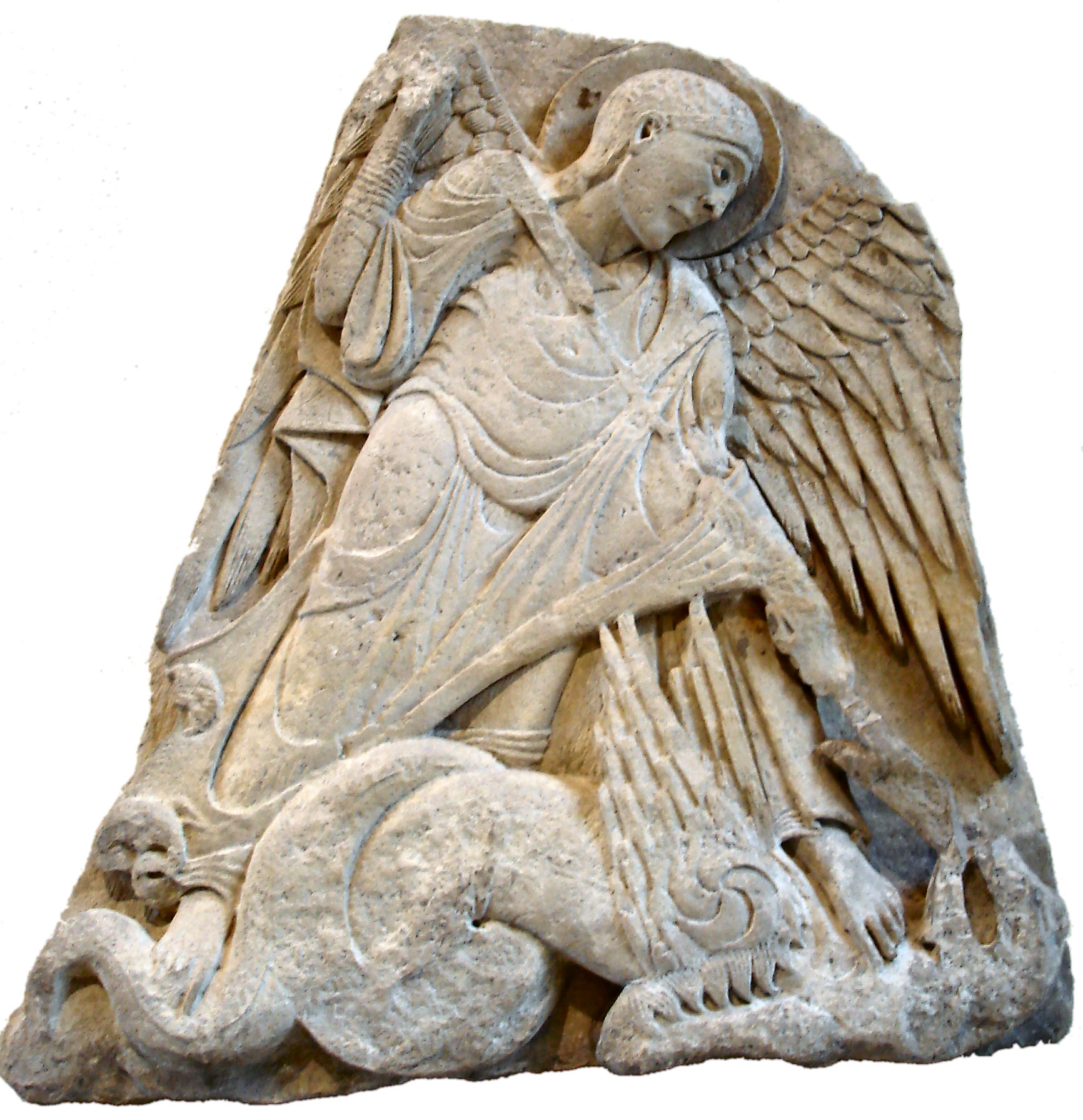
Saint Michael slaying the dragon, a scene that possibly inspired the battle between Eärendil and Ancalagon

Ancalagon is compared with Jormungandr, a mythological figure described as a undoubtedly large serpent who confronts Thor at Ragnarök. In the biblical counterpart, he represents Satan, who is confronted by the Archangel Michael according to a prophecy told in the story of the Apocalypse in the Book of Revelation. The reference to Tolkien's linguistic essay, Athrabeth Finrod ah Andreth, published in Morgoth's Ring, which brings Andreth's prophecy into play, enhances "Ancalagon's mythological importance within the legendarium", as does the parallel with Jormungandr.

In spite of his limited role, he is of paramount importance, both for his role in his master's downfall, but also for the evolution of the dragon race as the first dragon capable of flight. Rateliff regrets that the fight between Ancalagon and Eärendil is not more detailed. According to Kristin Larsen, the confrontation is a euhemeric rendering of a meteor shower falling on the planet Venus, the latter of which is described as the star corresponding to Eärendil in Tolkien's mythology. The battle is described by Evans as "titanic", with Ancalagon's fall mentioned as "cataclysmic".

== Adaptations and legacy ==
The battle between Ancalagon the Black and Eärendil has been illustrated by Ted Nasmith. Jenny Dolfen also drew the dragon.

== Sources ==
=== Primary ===
- Rateliff, John D. (2007). The History of the Hobbit. London: HarperCollins. ISBN 978-0-00-723555-1.
- Tolkien, J. R. R. (1954a). The Fellowship of the Ring. The Lord of the Rings. Boston: Houghton Mifflin. OCLC 9552942.
- Tolkien, J. R. R. (1977). Christopher Tolkien (ed.). The Silmarillion. Boston: Houghton Mifflin. ISBN 978-0-395-25730-2.
- Tolkien, J. R. R. (1986). Christopher Tolkien (ed.). The Shaping of Middle-earth. Boston: Houghton Mifflin. ISBN 978-0-395-42501-5.
- Tolkien, J. R. R. (1987). Christopher Tolkien (ed.). The Lost Road and Other Writings. Boston: Houghton Mifflin. ISBN 0-395-45519-7.
- Tolkien, J. R. R. (1996). Christopher Tolkien (ed.). The Peoples of Middle-earth. Boston: Houghton Mifflin. ISBN 978-0-395-82760-4.

=== Secondary ===
- Evans, Jonathan (2000). "The Dragon-lore of Middle-earth: Tolkien and Old English and Old Norse Tradition". In Clark, Georges; Timmons, Daniel (eds.). J. R. R. Tolkien and His Literary Resonances: Views of Middle-earth. Greenwood Publishing Group. ISBN 0313308454.
- Evans, Jonathan (2007). "Dragons". In Drout, Michael D. C. (ed.). J. R. R. Tolkien Encyclopedia: Scholarship and Critical Assessment. Routledge. ISBN 978-0-415-96942-0.
- Houghton, John William (2009). "Book Reviews: The Mirror Crack'd: Fear and Horror in J.R.R. Tolkien's Major Works". Tolkien Studies. 6. West Virginia University Press: 272–277. doi:10.1353/tks.0.0047.
