= List of Psilodercidae species =

This page lists all described species of the spider family Psilodercidae accepted by the World Spider Catalog as of January 2021:

== A ==
=== Althepus ===
Althepus Thorell, 1898

- A. bako Deeleman-Reinhold, 1995 — Malaysia (Borneo)
- A. bamensis F. Y. Li & S. Q. Li, 2018 — Thailand
- A. biltoni Deeleman-Reinhold, 1995 — Indonesia (Sulawesi)
- A. changmao F. Y. Li & S. Q. Li, 2018 — Thailand
- A. chengmenensis F. Y. Li & S. Q. Li, 2018 — China
- A. cheni F. Y. Li & S. Q. Li, 2018 — Myanmar
- A. christae Wang & Li, 2013 — China
- A. complicatus Deeleman-Reinhold, 1995 — Indonesia (Sumatra)
- A. dekkingae Deeleman-Reinhold, 1995 — Indonesia (Java)
- A. devraii Kulkarni & Dupérré, 2019 — India
- A. dongnaiensis F. Y. Li & S. Q. Li, 2018 — Vietnam
- A. duan F. Y. Li & S. Q. Li, 2017 — Thailand
- A. duoji F. Y. Li & S. Q. Li, 2017 — Thailand
- A. erectus F. Y. Li, S. Q. Li & Jäger, 2014 — Laos
- A. flabellaris F. Y. Li, S. Q. Li & Jäger, 2014 — Thailand
- A. gouci F. Y. Li & S. Q. Li, 2018 — Myanmar
- A. guan F. Y. Li & S. Q. Li, 2018 — Indonesia (Sumatra)
- A. hongguangi F. Y. Li & S. Q. Li, 2018 — Indonesia (Sulawesi)
- A. huoyan F. Y. Li & S. Q. Li, 2017 — Thailand
- A. incognitus Brignoli, 1973 — India
- A. indistinctus Deeleman-Reinhold, 1995 — Indonesia (Borneo)
- A. javanensis Deeleman-Reinhold, 1995 — Indonesia (Java)
- A. jiandan F. Y. Li & S. Q. Li, 2017 — Thailand
- A. kuan F. Y. Li & S. Q. Li, 2017 — Thailand
- A. lakmueangensis F. Y. Li & S. Q. Li, 2017 — Thailand
- A. languensis F. Y. Li & S. Q. Li, 2017 — Thailand
- A. lehi Deeleman-Reinhold, 1985 — Malaysia (Borneo)
- A. leucosternus Deeleman-Reinhold, 1995 — Thailand
- A. maechamensis F. Y. Li & S. Q. Li, 2018 — Thailand
- A. menglaensis F. Y. Li & S. Q. Li, 2018 — China
- A. minimus Deeleman-Reinhold, 1995 — Indonesia (Sumatra)
- A. muangensis F. Y. Li & S. Q. Li, 2017 — Thailand
- A. naphongensis F. Y. Li & S. Q. Li, 2018 — Vietnam
- A. natmataungensis F. Y. Li & S. Q. Li, 2018 — Myanmar
- A. noonadanae Brignoli, 1973 — Philippines
- A. nophaseudi F. Y. Li, S. Q. Li & Jäger, 2014 — Laos
- A. phadaengensis F. Y. Li & S. Q. Li, 2018 — Thailand
- A. phousalao F. Y. Li & S. Q. Li, 2018 — Laos
- A. pictus Thorell, 1898 (type) — Myanmar
- A. pum Deeleman-Reinhold, 1995 — Thailand
- A. qianhuang F. Y. Li & S. Q. Li, 2018 — Indonesia (Java)
- A. qingyuani F. Y. Li & S. Q. Li, 2018 — China
- A. qiqiu F. Y. Li & S. Q. Li, 2017 — Thailand
- A. reduncus F. Y. Li, S. Q. Li & Jäger, 2014 — Myanmar
- A. sepakuensis F. Y. Li & S. Q. Li, 2018 — Indonesia (Borneo)
- A. shanhu F. Y. Li & S. Q. Li, 2018 — Myanmar
- A. spiralis F. Y. Li, S. Q. Li & Jäger, 2014 — Malaysia
- A. stonei Deeleman-Reinhold, 1995 — Thailand
- A. suayaiensis F. Y. Li & S. Q. Li, 2018 — Thailand
- A. suhartoi Deeleman-Reinhold, 1985 — Indonesia (Sumatra)
- A. tadetuensis F. Y. Li & S. Q. Li, 2018 — Laos
- A. tanhuang F. Y. Li & S. Q. Li, 2018 — Thailand
- A. thanlaensis F. Y. Li & S. Q. Li, 2018 — Thailand
- A. tharnlodensis F. Y. Li & S. Q. Li, 2018 — Thailand
- A. tibiatus Deeleman-Reinhold, 1985 — Thailand
- A. tuqi F. Y. Li & S. Q. Li, 2017 — Thailand
- A. viengkeoensis F. Y. Li & S. Q. Li, 2018 — Laos
- A. xianxi F. Y. Li & S. Q. Li, 2017 — Thailand
- A. xuae F. Y. Li & S. Q. Li, 2018 — China
- A. yizhuang F. Y. Li & S. Q. Li, 2018 — Indonesia (Sumatra)

== F ==
=== Flexicrurum ===
Flexicrurum Tong & Li, 2007

- F. flexicrurum Tong & Li, 2007 (type) — China (Hainan)
- F. longispina Tong & Li, 2007 — China (Hainan)
- F. minutum Tong & Li, 2007 — China (Hainan)
- F. qishi F. Y. Li & S. Q. Li, 2019 — China (Hainan)
- F. wuzhishanense F. Y. Li & S. Q. Li, 2019 — China (Hainan)
- F. yangjiao F. Y. Li & S. Q. Li, 2019 — China (Hainan)

== L ==
=== Leclercera ===
Leclercera Deeleman-Reinhold, 1995

- L. aniensis Chang & Li, 2020 — China
- L. banensis Chang & Li, 2020 — Thailand
- L. duandai Chang & Li, 2020 — China
- L. duibaensis Chang & Li, 2020 — China
- L. dumuzhou Chang & Li, 2020 — Thailand
- L. ekteenensis Chang & Li, 2020 — Nepal
- L. hponensis Chang & Li, 2020 — Myanmar
- L. jianzuiyu Chang & Li, 2020 — Thailand
- L. jiazhongensis Chang & Li, 2020 — China
- L. khaoyai Deeleman-Reinhold, 1995 (type) — Thailand
- L. lizi Chang & Li, 2020 — China
- L. longiventris Deeleman-Reinhold, 1995 — Thailand
- L. machadoi (Brignoli, 1973) — Nepal
- L. maochong Chang & Li, 2020 — China
- L. mianqiu Chang & Li, 2020 — Indonesia (Sulawesi)
- L. mulcata (Brignoli, 1973) — Nepal
- L. nagarjunensis F. Y. Li & S. Q. Li, 2018 — Nepal
- L. negros Deeleman-Reinhold, 1995 — Philippines
- L. niuqu F. Y. Li & S. Q. Li, 2018 — Nepal
- L. ocellata Deeleman-Reinhold, 1995 — Borneo
- L. paiensis Chang & Li, 2020 — China
- L. pulongensis Chang & Li, 2020 — China
- L. renqinensis Chang & Li, 2020 — China
- L. sanjiao Chang & Li, 2020 — China
- L. selasihensis Chang & Li, 2020 — Indonesia (Sumatra)
- L. shanzi Chang & Li, 2020 — China
- L. shergylaensis Chang & Li, 2020 — China
- L. sidai F. Y. Li & S. Q. Li, 2018 — Nepal
- L. spinata Deeleman-Reinhold, 1995 — Indonesia (Sulawesi)
- L. suwanensis Chang & Li, 2020 — Thailand
- L. thamkaewensis Chang & Li, 2020 — Thailand
- L. thamsangensis Chang & Li, 2020 — Thailand
- L. tudao Chang & Li, 2020 — China
- L. undulata Wang & Li, 2013 — China
- L. xiangbabang Chang & Li, 2020 — Thailand
- L. xiaodai Chang & Li, 2020 — China
- L. yamaensis Chang & Li, 2020 — Thailand
- L. yandou Chang & Li, 2020 — Malaysia (Peninsula)
- L. yanjing Chang & Li, 2020 — China
- L. yuanzhui Chang & Li, 2020 — China
- L. zanggaensis Chang & Li, 2020 — China
- L. zhamensis Chang & Li, 2020 — China
- L. zhaoi F. Y. Li & S. Q. Li, 2018 — Nepal

=== Luzonacera ===
Luzonacera F. Y. Li & S. Q. Li, 2017

- L. chang F. Y. Li & S. Q. Li, 2017 (type) — Philippines (Luzon)
- L. duan F. Y. Li & S. Q. Li, 2017 — Philippines (Luzon)
- L. francescoballarini F. Y. Li & S. Q. Li, 2019 — Philippines (Luzon)
- L. lattuensis F. Y. Li & S. Q. Li, 2019 — Philippines (Luzon)
- L. peterjaegeri F. Y. Li & S. Q. Li, 2019 — Philippines (Luzon)

== M ==
=== Merizocera ===
Merizocera Fage, 1912

- M. baoshan Li, 2020 — China
- M. betong Li, 2020 — Thailand
- M. brincki Brignoli, 1975 — Sri Lanka
- M. colombo Li, 2020 — Sri Lanka
- M. crinita (Fage, 1929) — Malaysia
- M. cruciata (Simon, 1893) (type) — Sri Lanka
- M. galle Li, 2020 — Sri Lanka
- M. hponkanrazi Li, 2020 — Myanmar
- M. kachin Li, 2020 — Myanmar
- M. kandy Li, 2020 — Sri Lanka
- M. krabi Li, 2020 — Thailand
- M. kurunegala Li, 2020 — Sri Lanka
- M. lincang Li, 2020 — China
- M. mainling Li, 2020 — China
- M. mandai Li, 2020 — Singapore
- M. nyingchi Li, 2020 — China
- M. oryzae Brignoli, 1975 — Sri Lanka
- M. peraderiya Li, 2020 — Sri Lanka
- M. phuket Li, 2020 — Thailand
- M. picturata (Simon, 1893) — Sri Lanka
- M. putao Li, 2020 — Myanmar
- M. pygmaea Deeleman-Reinhold, 1995 — Thailand
- M. ranong Li, 2020 — Thailand
- M. ratnapura Li, 2020 — Sri Lanka
- M. salawa Li, 2020 — Sri Lanka
- M. stellata (Simon, 1905) — Indonesia (Java)
- M. tak Li, 2020 — Thailand
- M. tanintharyi Li, 2020 — Myanmar
- M. tengchong Li, 2020 — China
- M. thenna Li, 2020 — Sri Lanka
- M. uva Li, 2020 — Sri Lanka
- M. wenshan Li, 2020 — China
- M. wui Li, 2020 — Myanmar
- M. yala Li, 2020 — Thailand
- M. yuxi Li, 2020 — China

== P ==
=== Priscaleclercera ===
Priscaleclercera Wunderlich, 2017

=== Psiloderces ===
Psiloderces Simon, 1892

- P. albostictus Deeleman-Reinhold, 1995 — Thailand
- P. althepoides Deeleman-Reinhold, 1995 — Malaysia (Borneo)
- P. bangkiraiensis Li & Chang, 2020 — Indonesia (Borneo)
- P. bolang Li & Chang, 2020 — Indonesia (Sulawesi)
- P. bontocensis Li & Chang, 2020 — Philippines (Luzon)
- P. cattienensis Li & Chang, 2020 — Vietnam
- P. coronatus Deeleman-Reinhold, 1995 — Indonesia (Java)
- P. cuyapoensis Li & Chang, 2020 — Philippines (Luzon)
- P. dicellocerus Li, Li & Jäger, 2014 — Indonesia (Flores)
- P. egeria Simon, 1892 (type) — Philippines (Luzon)
- P. elasticus (Brignoli, 1975) — Sri Lanka
- P. enigmatus Deeleman-Reinhold, 1995 — Malaysia (Borneo)
- P. fredstonei Deeleman-Reinhold, 1995 — Thailand
- P. gawanaensis Li & Chang, 2020 — Philippines (Luzon)
- P. grohotensis Li & Chang, 2020 — Indonesia (Borneo)
- P. heise Li & Chang, 2020 — Philippines (Luzon)
- P. howarthi Deeleman-Reinhold, 1995 — Thailand
- P. incomptus Wang & Li, 2013 — China
- P. kalimantan Deeleman-Reinhold, 1995 — Indonesia (Borneo)
- P. leclerci Deeleman-Reinhold, 1995 — Indonesia (Sulawesi)
- P. leucopygius Deeleman-Reinhold, 1995 — Indonesia (Sumatra)
- P. ligula Baert, 1988 — Indonesia (Sulawesi)
- P. limosa Deeleman-Reinhold, 1995 — Indonesia (Sumatra)
- P. longipalpis Baert, 1988 — Indonesia (Sulawesi)
- P. malinoensis Li & Chang, 2020 — Indonesia (Sulawesi)
- P. nasicornis Baert, 1988 — Indonesia (Sulawesi)
- P. palopoensis Li & Chang, 2020 — Indonesia (Sulawesi)
- P. penaeorum Deeleman-Reinhold, 1995 — Thailand
- P. penajamensis Li & Chang, 2020 — Indonesia (Borneo)
- P. pingguo Li & Chang, 2020 — Vietnam
- P. pulcher Deeleman-Reinhold, 1995 — Malaysia (Borneo)
- P. septentrionalis Deeleman-Reinhold, 1995 — Thailand
- P. suthepensis Deeleman-Reinhold, 1995 — Thailand
- P. tesselatus Deeleman-Reinhold, 1995 — Indonesia (Java)
- P. torajanus Deeleman-Reinhold, 1995 — Indonesia (Sulawesi)
- P. vallicola Deeleman-Reinhold, 1995 — Indonesia (Sumatra)
- P. wangou Li & Chang, 2020 — Indonesia (Sulawesi)
- P. xichang Li & Chang, 2020 — Philippines (Luzon)

== Q ==
=== Qiongocera ===
Qiongocera F. Y. Li & S. Q. Li, 2017

- Q. hongjunensis F. Y. Li & S. Q. Li, 2017 (type) — China (Hainan)
- Q. luoxuan F. Y. Li & S. Q. Li, 2019 — China (Hainan)

== R ==
=== Relictocera ===
Relictocera F. Y. Li & S. Q. Li, 2017

- R. mus (Deeleman-Reinhold, 1995) — Thailand
- R. qianzi F. Y. Li & S. Q. Li, 2019 — Thailand
- R. qiyi F. Y. Li & S. Q. Li, 2017 (type) — Vietnam
- R. sigen F. Y. Li & S. Q. Li, 2019 — Vietnam
- R. wugen F. Y. Li & S. Q. Li, 2019 — Vietnam

== S ==
=== Sinoderces ===
Sinoderces F. Y. Li & S. Q. Li, 2017

- S. aiensis F. Y. Li & S. Q. Li, 2019 — China (Hainan)
- S. dewaroopensis F. Y. Li & S. Q. Li, 2019 — Thailand
- S. exilis (Wang & Li, 2013) — China
- S. khanensis F. Y. Li & S. Q. Li, 2019 — Laos
- S. kieoensis F. Y. Li & S. Q. Li, 2019 — Laos
- S. luohanensis F. Y. Li & S. Q. Li, 2019 — China
- S. nawanensis F. Y. Li & S. Q. Li, 2017 (type) — China
- S. phathaoensis F. Y. Li & S. Q. Li, 2019 — Laos
- S. saraburiensis F. Y. Li & S. Q. Li, 2019 — Thailand
- S. taichi F. Y. Li & S. Q. Li, 2019 — China (Hainan)
- S. wenshanensis F. Y. Li & S. Q. Li, 2019 — China
- S. xueae F. Y. Li & S. Q. Li, 2019 — China (Hainan)

== T ==
=== Thaiderces ===
Thaiderces F. Y. Li & S. Q. Li, 2017

- T. chujiao Li & Chang, 2019 — Thailand
- T. djojosudharmoi (Deeleman-Reinhold, 1995) — Indonesia (Sumatra)
- T. fengniao Li & Chang, 2019 — Thailand
- T. ganlan Li & Chang, 2019 — Myanmar
- T. haima Li & Chang, 2019 — Thailand
- T. jian F. Y. Li & S. Q. Li, 2017 (type) — Thailand
- T. jiazi Li & Chang, 2019 — Thailand
- T. miantiao Li & Chang, 2019 — Thailand
- T. ngalauindahensis Li & Chang, 2019 — Indonesia (Sumatra)
- T. peterjaegeri Li & Chang, 2019 — Myanmar
- T. rimbu (Deeleman-Reinhold, 1995) — Indonesia (Sumatra)
- T. shuzi Li & Chang, 2019 — Thailand
- T. thamphadaengensis Li & Chang, 2019 — Thailand
- T. thamphrikensis Li & Chang, 2019 — Thailand
- T. tuoyuan Li & Chang, 2019 — Thailand
- T. vulgaris (Deeleman-Reinhold, 1995) — Thailand
- T. yangcong Li & Chang, 2019 — Indonesia (Sumatra)
- T. zuichun Li & Chang, 2019 — Thailand
