= List of Ochyroceratidae species =

This page lists all described species of the spider family Ochyroceratidae accepted by the World Spider Catalog as of January 2021:

== A ==
=== † Aculeatosoma ===
† Aculeatosoma Wunderlich, 2017 - Psilodercinae

- † A. pyritmutatio Wunderlich, 2017

=== † Arachnolithulus ===
† Arachnolithulus Wunderlich, 1988

- † A. longipes Wunderlich, 2004
- † A. pygmaeus Wunderlich, 1988

== D ==
=== Dundocera ===
Dundocera Machado, 1951

- D. angolana (Machado, 1951) — Angola
- D. fagei Machado, 1951 (type) — Angola
- D. gabelensis (Machado, 1951) — Angola

== E ==
=== Euso ===
Euso Saaristo, 2001

- E. muehlenbergi (Saaristo, 1998) (type) — Seychelles

== F ==
=== Fageicera ===
Fageicera Dumitrescu & Georgescu, 1992

- F. cubana Dumitrescu & Georgescu, 1992 (type) — Cuba
- F. loma Dumitrescu & Georgescu, 1992 — Cuba
- F. matarredondensis Cuervo & Buitrago, 2017 — Colombia
- F. nasuta Dumitrescu & Georgescu, 1992 — Cuba

== L ==
=== † Leclercera ===
† Leclercera Deeleman-Reinhold, 1995 - Psilodercinae

=== Lundacera ===
Lundacera Machado, 1951

- L. tchikapensis Machado, 1951 (type) — Angola

== O ==
=== Ochyrocera ===
Ochyrocera

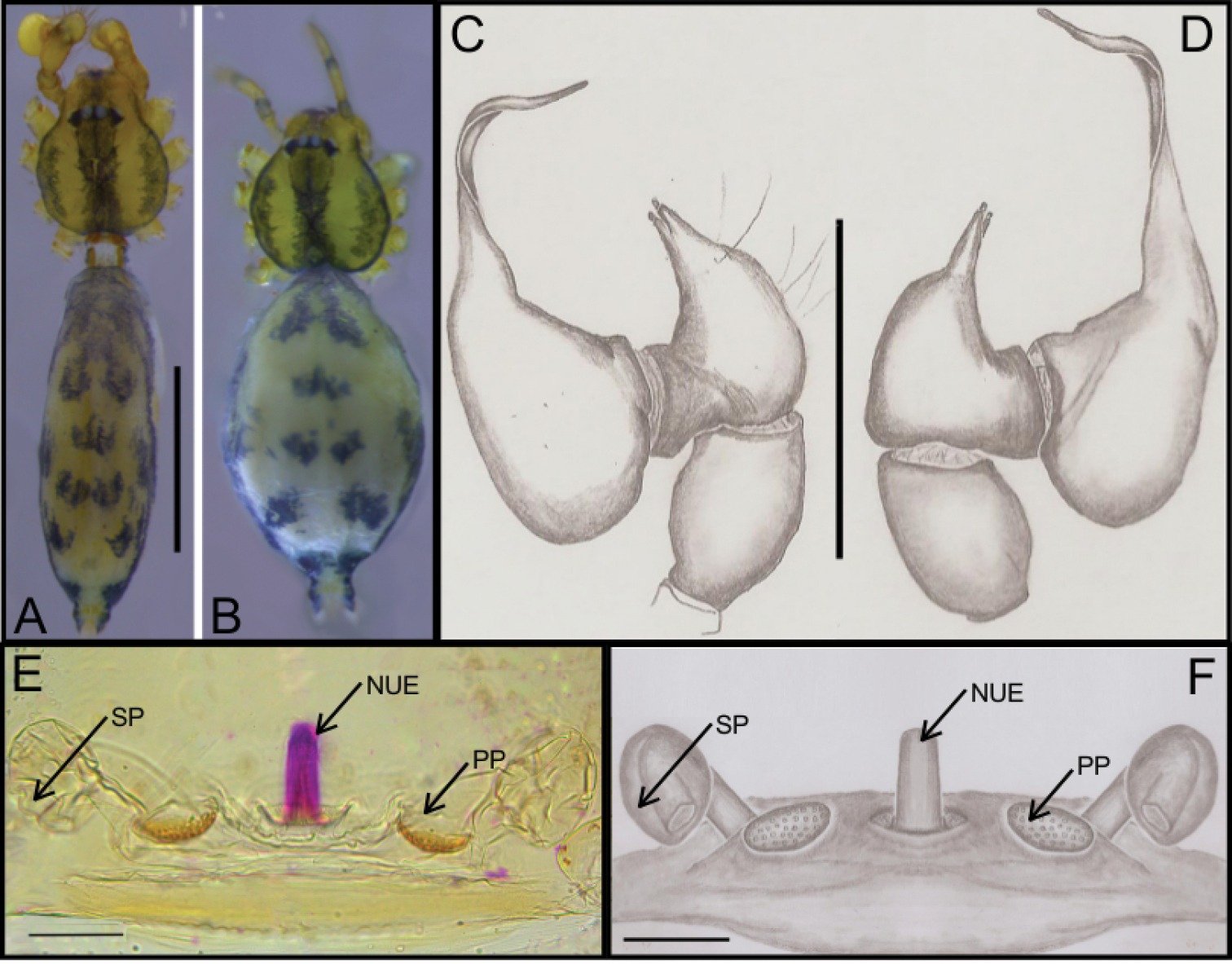
Ochyrocera aragogue

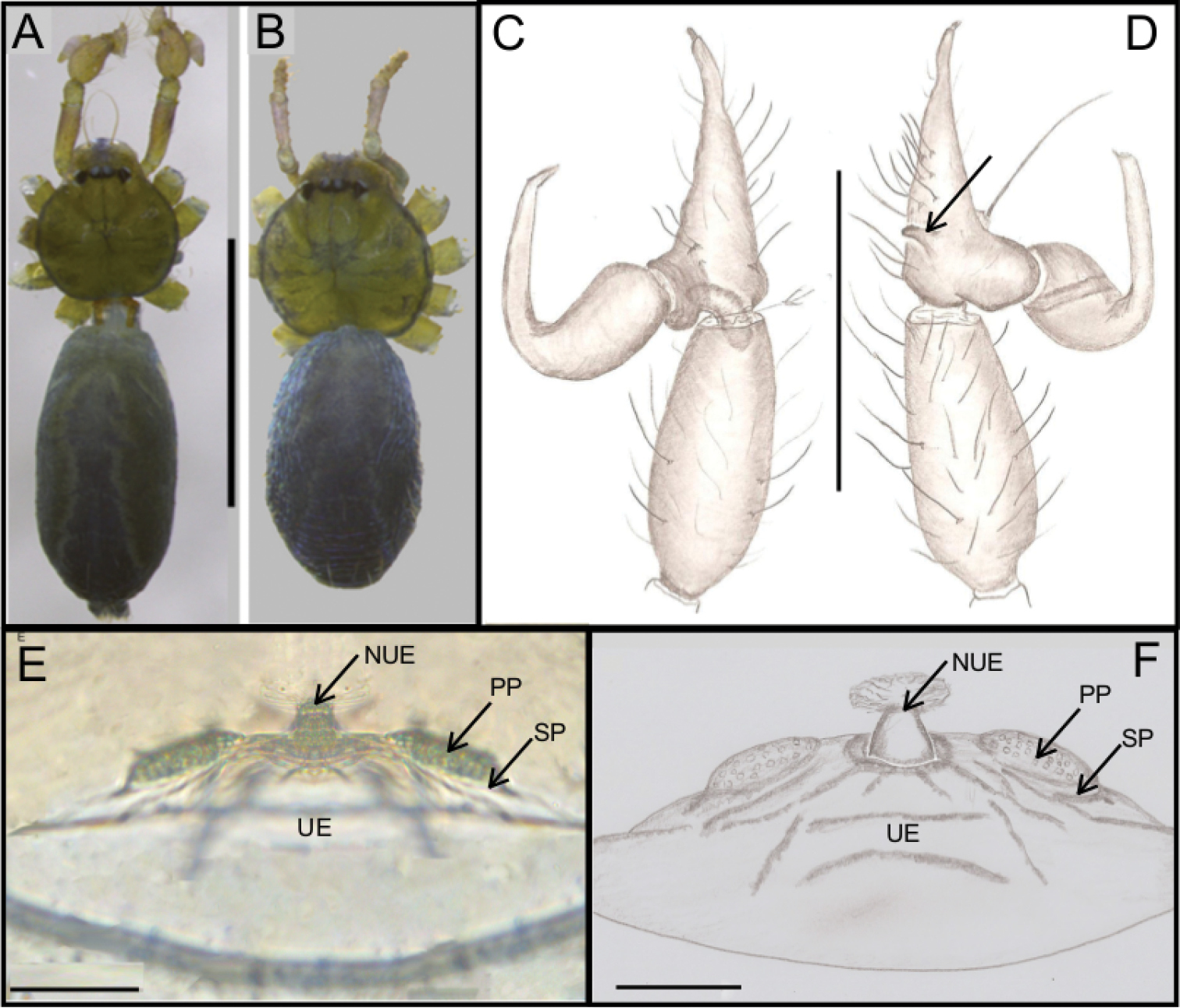
Ochyrocera atlachnacha

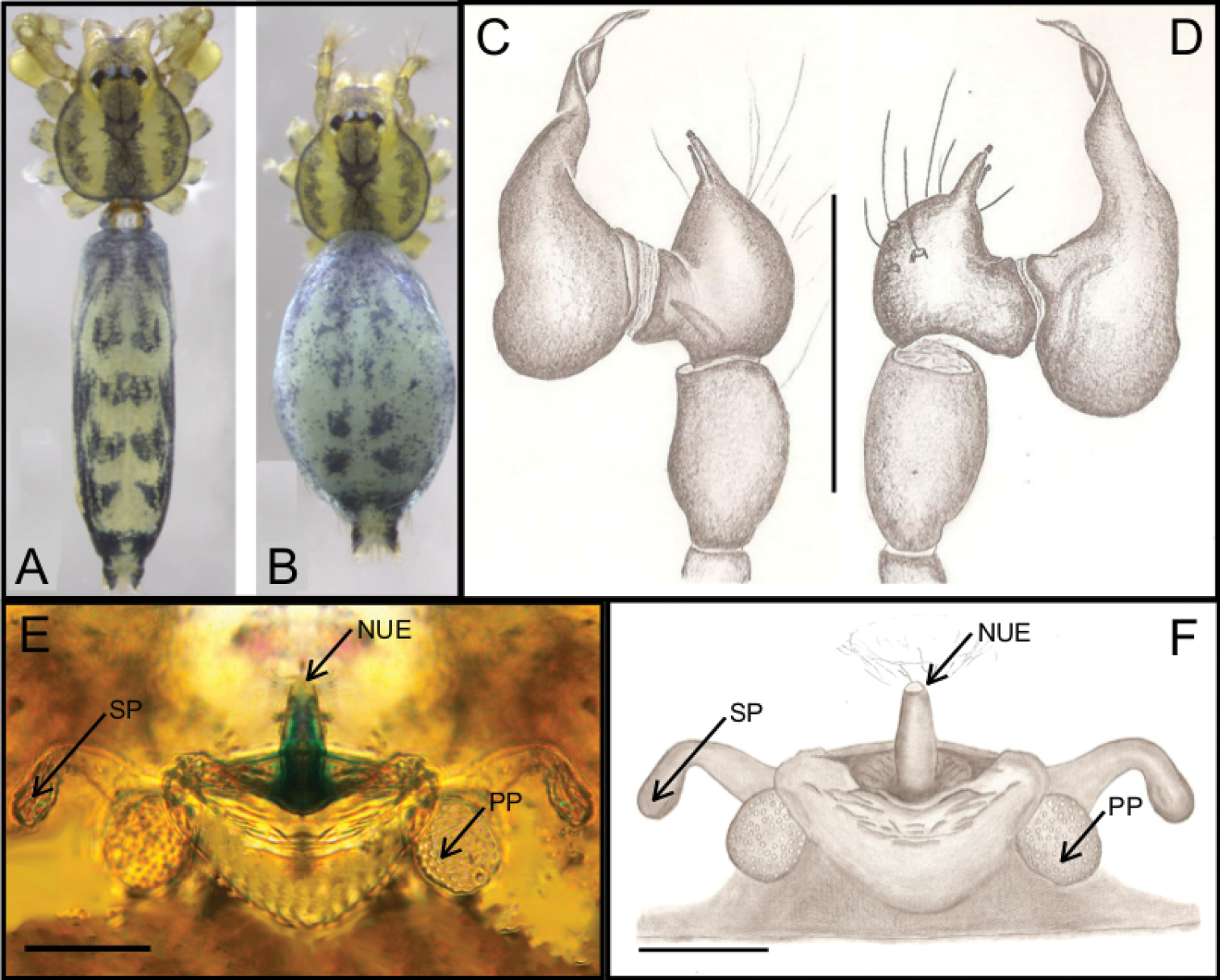
Ochyrocera laracna

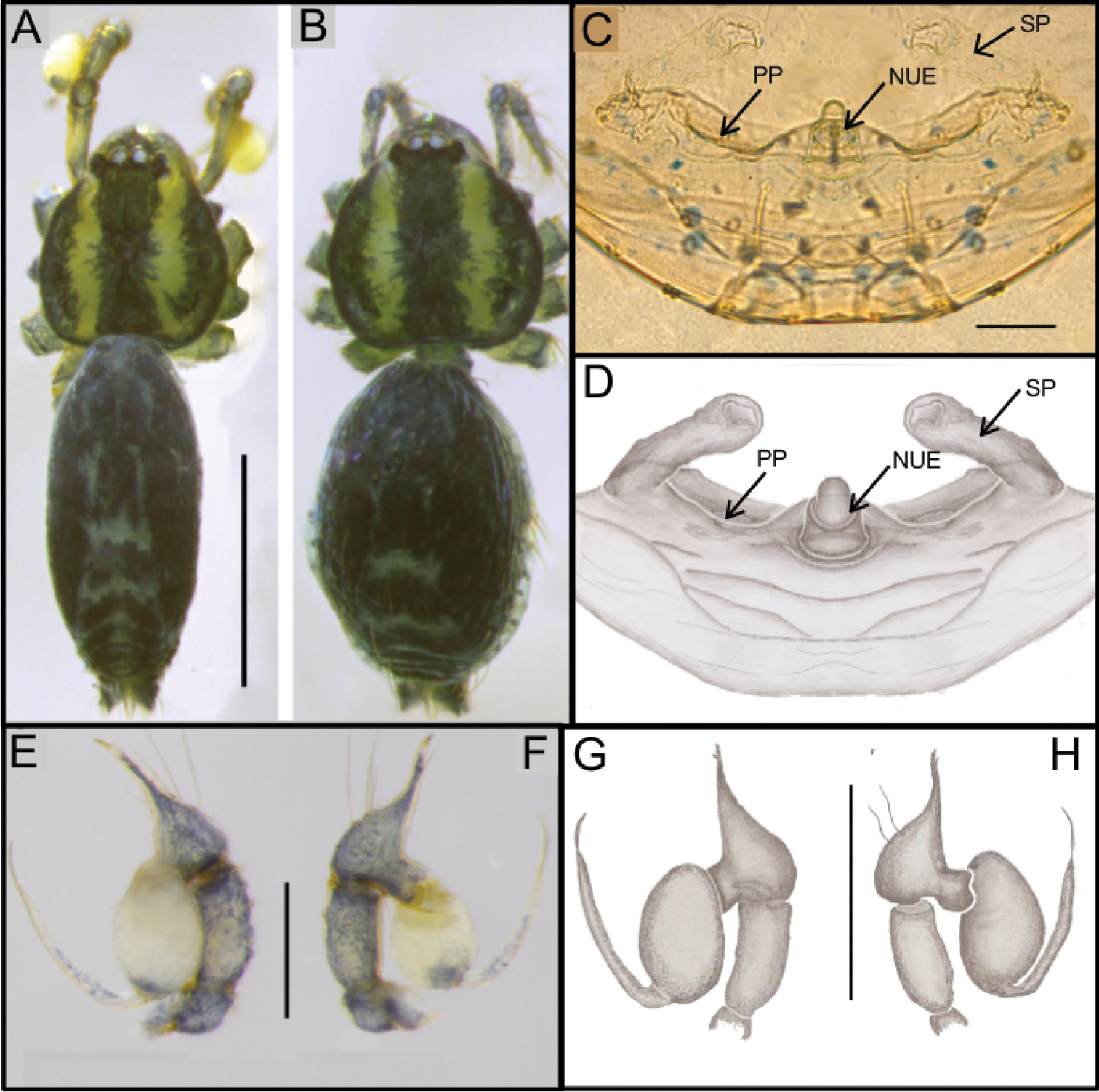
Ochyrocera ungoliant

Ochyrocera Simon, 1892

- Ochyrocera aragogue Brescovit, Cizauskas & Mota, 2018 – Brazil
- Ochyrocera arietina Simon, 1892 (type) – Cuba, St. Vincent
- Ochyrocera atlachnacha Brescovit, Cizauskas & Mota, 2018 – Brazil
- Ochyrocera bicolor González-Sponga, 2001 – Venezuela
- Ochyrocera brumadinho Brescovit & Cizauskas, 2018 – Brazil
- Ochyrocera cachote Hormiga, Álvarez-Padilla & Benjamin, 2007 – Hispaniola
- Ochyrocera caeruleoamethystina Lopez & Lopez, 1997 – French Guiana
- Ochyrocera callaina Dupérré, 2015 – Ecuador
- Ochyrocera cashcatotoras Dupérré, 2015 – Ecuador
- Ochyrocera charlotte Brescovit, Cizauskas & Mota, 2018 – Brazil
- Ochyrocera chiapas Valdez-Mondragón, 2009 – Mexico
- Ochyrocera coerulea (Keyserling, 1891) – Brazil
- Ochyrocera coffeeicola González-Sponga, 2001 – Venezuela
- Ochyrocera cornuta Mello-Leitão, 1944 – Brazil
- Ochyrocera corozalensis González-Sponga, 2001 – Venezuela
- Ochyrocera diablo Pérez-González, Rubio & Ramírez, 2016 – Argentina
- Ochyrocera dorinha (Brescovit, Zampaulo, Pedroso & Cizauskas, 2021) – Brazil
- Ochyrocera fagei Brignoli, 1974 – Mexico
- Ochyrocera formosa Gertsch, 1973 – Guatemala
- Ochyrocera garayae Castanheira, Pérez-González, do Prado & Baptista, 2019 – Brazil
- Ochyrocera hamadryas Brignoli, 1978 – Brazil
- Ochyrocera ibitipoca Baptista, González & Tourinho, 2008 – Brazil
- Ochyrocera italoi Dupérré, 2015 – Ecuador
- Ochyrocera itatinga Castanheira, Pérez-González, do Prado & Baptista, 2019 – Brazil
- Ochyrocera janthinipes Simon, 1893 – Venezuela
- Ochyrocera jarocha Valdez-Mondragón, 2017 – Mexico
- Ochyrocera juquila Valdez-Mondragón, 2009 – Mexico
- Ochyrocera laracna Brescovit, Cizauskas & Mota, 2018 – Brazil
- Ochyrocera losrios Dupérré, 2015 – Ecuador
- Ochyrocera machadoi (Gertsch, 1977) – Mexico
- Ochyrocera magali (Brescovit, Zampaulo, Pedroso & Cizauskas, 2021) – Brazil
- Ochyrocera minima González-Sponga, 2001 – Venezuela
- Ochyrocera minotaure Dupérré, 2015 – Ecuador
- Ochyrocera misspider Brescovit, Cizauskas & Mota, 2018 – Brazil
- Ochyrocera monica (Brescovit, Zampaulo, Pedroso & Cizauskas, 2021) – Brazil
- Ochyrocera oblita Fage, 1912 – Venezuela
- Ochyrocera otonga Dupérré, 2015 – Ecuador
- Ochyrocera peruana Ribera, 1978 – Peru
- Ochyrocera pojoj Valdez-Mondragón, 2017 – Mexico
- Ochyrocera quinquevittata Simon, 1892 – St. Vincent
- Ochyrocera ransfordi (Marples, 1955) – Samoa
- Ochyrocera rinocerotos Dupérré, 2015 – Ecuador
- Ochyrocera ritxoco (Brescovit, Zampaulo & Cizauskas, 2021) – Brazil
- Ochyrocera ritxoo (Brescovit, Zampaulo & Cizauskas, 2021) – Brazil
- Ochyrocera rosinha (Brescovit, Zampaulo, Pedroso & Cizauskas, 2021) – Brazil
- Ochyrocera sandovalae Baert, 2014 – Ecuador
- Ochyrocera simoni O. Pickard-Cambridge, 1894 – Mexico
- Ochyrocera subparamera González-Sponga, 2001 – Venezuela
- Ochyrocera thibaudi Emerit & Lopez, 1985 – Lesser Antilles
- Ochyrocera tinocoi Castanheira, Pérez-González, do Prado & Baptista, 2019 – Brazil
- Ochyrocera ungoliant Brescovit, Cizauskas & Mota, 2018 – Brazil
- Ochyrocera varys Brescovit, Cizauskas & Mota, 2018 – Brazil
- Ochyrocera vesiculifera Simon, 1893 – Venezuela
- Ochyrocera viridissima Brignoli, 1974 – Brazil
- Ochyrocera zabaleta Dupérré, 2015 – Ecuador
- Ochyrocera zamora Baert, 2014 – Ecuador

=== Ouette ===
Ouette Saaristo, 1998

- O. gyrus Tong & Li, 2007 — China (Hainan)
- O. ouette Saaristo, 1998 (type) — Seychelles

== P ==
=== † Priscaleclercera ===
† Priscaleclercera Wunderlich, 2017 - Psilodercinae

- † P. brevispinae Wunderlich, 2017
- † P. ellenbergeri Wunderlich, 2015
- † P. longissipes Wunderlich, 2012
- † P. paucispinae Wunderlich, 2017
- † P. sexaculeata Wunderlich, 2015
- † P. spicula Wunderlich, 2012

=== † Propterpsiloderces ===
† Propterpsiloderces Wunderlich, 2015 - Psilodercinae

- † P. longisetae Wunderlich, 2015

=== † Psiloderces ===
† Psiloderces Simon, 1892 - Psilodercinae

=== Psiloochyrocera ===
Psiloochyrocera Baert, 2014

- P. cajanuma Baert, 2014 (type) — Ecuador
- P. tortilis Dupérré, 2015 — Ecuador

== R ==
=== Roche ===
Roche Saaristo, 1998

- R. roche Saaristo, 1998 (type) — Seychelles

== S ==
=== Speocera ===
Speocera Berland, 1914

- S. amazonica Brignoli, 1978 — Brazil
- S. amber F. Y. Li & S. Q. Li, 2019 — Madagascar
- S. ankalana F. Y. Li & S. Q. Li, 2019 — Madagascar
- S. apo Deeleman-Reinhold, 1995 — Philippines
- S. asymmetrica Tong & Li, 2007 — China (Hainan)
- S. bachma F. Y. Li & S. Q. Li, 2019 — Vietnam
- S. balikpapan F. Y. Li & S. Q. Li, 2019 — Indonesia (Borneo)
- S. ballarini F. Y. Li & S. Q. Li, 2019 — Philippines (Luzon)
- S. bambusicola Brignoli, 1980 — Kenya
- S. batang F. Y. Li & S. Q. Li, 2019 — Indonesia (Sumatra)
- S. bawangling F. Y. Li & S. Q. Li, 2019 — China (Hainan)
- S. berlandi (Machado, 1951) — Angola
- S. bicornea Tong & Li, 2007 — China (Hainan)
- S. bioforestae Dupérré, 2015 — Ecuador
- S. bismarcki (Brignoli, 1976) — Papua New Guinea (Bismarck Arch.)
- S. bontoc F. Y. Li & S. Q. Li, 2019 — Philippines (Luzon)
- S. bosmansi Baert, 1988 — Indonesia (Sulawesi)
- S. bovenlanden Deeleman-Reinhold, 1995 — Indonesia (Sumatra)
- S. bukittinggi F. Y. Li & S. Q. Li, 2019 — Indonesia (Sumatra)
- S. bulbiformis Lin, Pham & Li, 2009 — Vietnam
- S. caeca Deeleman-Reinhold, 1995 — Indonesia (Sulawesi)
- S. capra Deeleman-Reinhold, 1995 — Thailand
- S. cattien F. Y. Li & S. Q. Li, 2019 — Vietnam
- S. crassibulba Deeleman-Reinhold, 1995 — Indonesia (Java)
- S. cucphuong F. Y. Li & S. Q. Li, 2019 — Vietnam
- S. cuyapo F. Y. Li & S. Q. Li, 2019 — Philippines (Luzon)
- S. dayakorum Deeleman-Reinhold, 1995 — Indonesia (Borneo)
- S. debundschaensis Baert, 1985 — Cameroon
- S. decui Dumitrescu & Georgescu, 1992 — Cuba
- S. deharvengi Deeleman-Reinhold, 1995 — Thailand
- S. dongjing F. Y. Li & S. Q. Li, 2019 — China
- S. eleonorae Baptista, 2003 — Brazil
- S. fagei (Berland, 1914) — Kenya
- S. feminina (Machado, 1951) — Angola
- S. gexuejuni F. Y. Li & S. Q. Li, 2019 — China (Hainan)
- S. griswoldi F. Y. Li & S. Q. Li, 2019 — Madagascar
- S. heilan F. Y. Li & S. Q. Li, 2019 — China (Hainan)
- S. huifengi F. Y. Li & S. Q. Li, 2019 — Thailand
- S. huisun F. Y. Li & S. Q. Li, 2019 — Taiwan
- S. indulgens Deeleman-Reinhold, 1995 — Indonesia (Sulawesi)
- S. irritans Brignoli, 1978 — Brazil
- S. jacquemarti Baert & Maelfait, 1986 — Ecuador (Galapagos Is.)
- S. javana (Simon, 1905) — Indonesia (Java), Seychelles
- S. jucunda Brignoli, 1979 — Brazil
- S. karkari (Baert, 1980) — Philippines, Indonesia (Sulawesi), New Guinea
- S. krikkeni Brignoli, 1977 — Indonesia (Sumatra)
- S. lahrak F. Y. Li & S. Q. Li, 2019 — Thailand
- S. laureata Komatsu, 1974 — Japan (Ryukyu Is.)
- S. leclerci Deeleman-Reinhold, 1995 — Thailand
- S. longyan F. Y. Li & S. Q. Li, 2019 — China
- S. manhao F. Y. Li & S. Q. Li, 2019 — China
- S. melinh F. Y. Li & S. Q. Li, 2019 — Vietnam
- S. microphthalma (Simon, 1892) — Philippines
- S. minuta (Marples, 1955) — Samoa, Tokelau, Niue
- S. molesta Brignoli, 1978 — Brazil
- S. musgo Dupérré, 2015 — Ecuador
- S. naumachiae Brignoli, 1980 — Thailand
- S. nuichua F. Y. Li & S. Q. Li, 2019 — Vietnam
- S. octodentis Tong & Li, 2007 — China (Hainan)
- S. onorei Baert, 2014 — Ecuador
- S. pallida Berland, 1914 (type) — East Africa
- S. papuana (Baert, 1980) — New Guinea
- S. parva Deeleman-Reinhold, 1995 — Malaysia (Borneo)
- S. payakumbuh F. Y. Li & S. Q. Li, 2019 — Indonesia (Sumatra)
- S. phangngaensis Deeleman-Reinhold, 1995 — Thailand
- S. pongo Deeleman-Reinhold, 1995 — Indonesia (Borneo)
- S. ranongensis Deeleman-Reinhold, 1995 — Thailand
- S. rjacksoni Barrion, Barrion-Dupo & Heong, 2013 — China (Hainan)
- S. songae Tong & Li, 2007 — China (Hainan)
- S. stellafera Deeleman-Reinhold, 1995 — Thailand, Malaysia
- S. suea F. Y. Li & S. Q. Li, 2019 — Thailand
- S. suratthaniensis Deeleman-Reinhold, 1995 — Thailand
- S. tabuk F. Y. Li & S. Q. Li, 2019 — Philippines (Luzon)
- S. taprobanica Brignoli, 1981 — Sri Lanka
- S. transleuser Deeleman-Reinhold, 1995 — Indonesia (Sumatra)
- S. trapezialis F. Y. Li & S. Q. Li, 2019 — Vietnam
- S. troglobia Deeleman-Reinhold, 1995 — Thailand
- S. trusmadi F. Y. Li & S. Q. Li, 2019 — Malaysia (Borneo)
- S. tubularis F. Y. Li & S. Q. Li, 2019 — Madagascar
- S. vilhenai Machado, 1951 — Angola
- S. violacea Dupérré, 2015 — Ecuador
- S. xiaoxiaoae F. Y. Li & S. Q. Li, 2019 — China (Hainan)
- S. xuanson F. Y. Li & S. Q. Li, 2019 — Vietnam
- S. zhigangi F. Y. Li & S. Q. Li, 2019 — China (Hainan)

== T ==
=== Theotima ===
Theotima Simon, 1893

- T. centralis (Gertsch, 1941) — Panama
- T. elva Gertsch, 1977 — Mexico
- T. fallax Fage, 1912 — Cuba, St. Vincent, Venezuela
- T. galapagosensis Baert & Maelfait, 1986 — Ecuador (Galapagos Is.)
- T. jeanneli Machado, 1951 — Angola
- T. kivuensis Machado, 1964 — Congo
- T. lawrencei Machado, 1964 — Congo
- T. makua Gertsch, 1973 — Hawaii
- T. martha Gertsch, 1977 — Mexico
- T. mbamensis Baert, 1985 — Cameroon
- T. minutissima (Petrunkevitch, 1929) — Tropical Asia. Introduced to Guam, Panama, Puerto Rico, Martinique, Germany, Czechia
- T. mirabilis Machado, 1951 — Angola
- T. modesta (Chickering, 1951) — Panama
- T. moxicensis Machado, 1951 — Angola
- T. pura Gertsch, 1973 — Mexico
- T. radiata (Simon, 1892) (type) — Cuba, Puerto Rico, Venezuela
- T. ruina Gertsch, 1977 — Mexico
- T. tchabalensis Baert, 1985 — Cameroon
