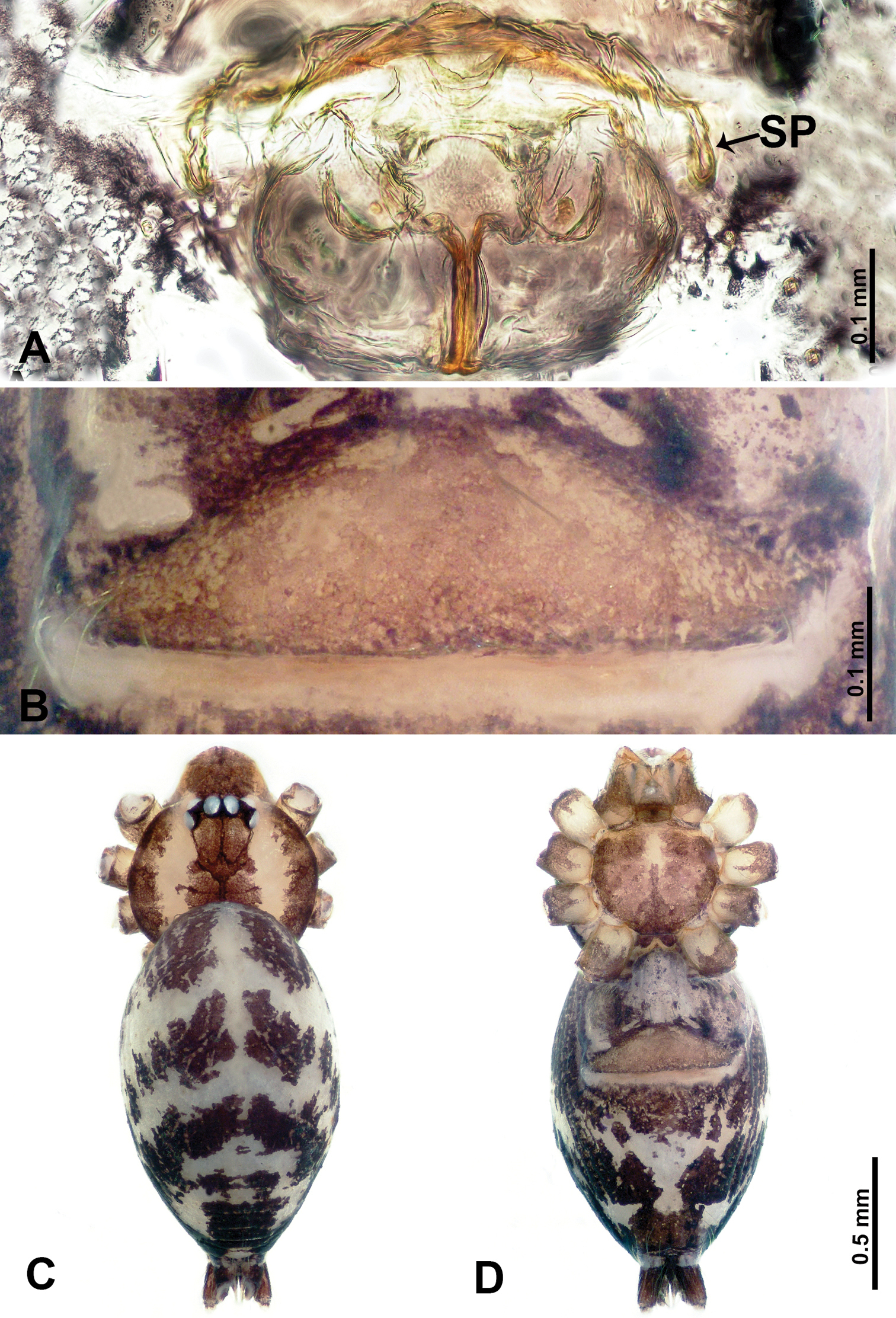
- Flexicrurum minutum

Scientific classification
- Domain: Eukaryota
- Kingdom: Animalia
- Phylum: Arthropoda
- Subphylum: Chelicerata
- Class: Arachnida
- Order: Araneae
- Infraorder: Araneomorphae
- Family: Psilodercidae
- Genus: Flexicrurum; Tong & Li, 2007

Species
- Flexicrurum flexicrurum Tong & Li, 2007; Flexicrurum longispina Tong & Li, 2007; Flexicrurum minutum Tong & Li, 2007
- Location of Hainan, China

= Flexicrurum =

Genus of spiders

Flexicrurum is a genus of spiders from China similar to the genera Althepus and Leclercera. Tong and Li originally placed the genus in Ochyroceratidae Still, Tong later moved it to Psilodercidae. Males are generally smaller than 2 mm, but the size of females is unknown. The name is derived from the Latin flex "curved", and crur "leg", referring to the inner turned palpal tibia of the male. As of 2019 three described species have been found in caves of Hainan Island.
