= Speocera tabuk =

Scientific classification
- Kingdom: Animalia
- Phylum: Arthropoda
- Subphylum: Chelicerata
- Class: Arachnida
- Order: Araneae
- Infraorder: Araneomorphae
- Family: Ochyroceratidae
- Genus: Speocera
- Species: S. tabuk

Binomial name
- Speocera tabuk Li & Li in Tong, Li, Song, Chen & Li, 2019

Species of spider

Speocera tabuk is a species of spider of the family Ochyroceratidae. It is endemic to the Luzon in the Philippines, specifically Tabuk.

== Distribution ==
This species is endemic to Luzon in the Philippines. It is found near Tabuk.
