= Althepus javanensis =

Scientific classification
- Domain: Eukaryota
- Kingdom: Animalia
- Phylum: Arthropoda
- Subphylum: Chelicerata
- Class: Arachnida
- Order: Araneae
- Infraorder: Araneomorphae
- Family: Psilodercidae
- Genus: Althepus
- Species: A. javanensis

Binomial name
- Althepus javanensis Deeleman-Reinhold, 1995

Species of spider

Althepus javanensis is a species of spider of the genus Althepus. It is endemic to Java in Indonesia.
