= Fageicera =

Scientific classification
- Domain: Eukaryota
- Kingdom: Animalia
- Phylum: Arthropoda
- Subphylum: Chelicerata
- Class: Arachnida
- Order: Araneae
- Infraorder: Araneomorphae
- Family: Ochyroceratidae
- Genus: Fageicera; Georgescu

Species
- Fageicera cubana Dumitrescu & Georgescu, 1992; Fageicera loma Dumitrescu & Georgescu, 1992; Fageicera nasuta Dumitrescu & Georgescu, 1992

Genus of spiders

Fageicera is a genus of spiders in the family Ochyroceratidae. It was first described in 1992 by Dumitrescu & Georgescu. As of 2016, it contains 3 species, all from Cuba.
