= Speocera irritans =

Scientific classification
- Kingdom: Animalia
- Phylum: Arthropoda
- Subphylum: Chelicerata
- Class: Arachnida
- Order: Araneae
- Infraorder: Araneomorphae
- Family: Ochyroceratidae
- Genus: Speocera
- Species: S. irritans

Binomial name
- Speocera irritans Brignoli, 1978

Species of spider

Speocera irritans is a species of spider of the family Ochyroceratidae. It is endemic to the Brazilian state of Amazonas.
