= Ouette =

Ouette may refer to:

- Ouette (spider), a genus of spiders in the family Ochyroceratidae
- Ouette (river), a river in western France, left tributary of the Mayenne
