= Althepus noonadanae =

Scientific classification
- Kingdom: Animalia
- Phylum: Arthropoda
- Subphylum: Chelicerata
- Class: Arachnida
- Order: Araneae
- Infraorder: Araneomorphae
- Family: Psilodercidae
- Genus: Althepus
- Species: A. noonadanae

Binomial name
- Althepus noonadanae Brignoli, 1973

Species of spider

Althepus noonadanae is a species of spider of the genus Althepus. It is endemic to Mindanao, Philippines.
