= Merizocera picturata =

Scientific classification
- Kingdom: Animalia
- Phylum: Arthropoda
- Subphylum: Chelicerata
- Class: Arachnida
- Order: Araneae
- Infraorder: Araneomorphae
- Family: Psilodercidae
- Genus: Merizocera
- Species: M. picturata

Binomial name
- Merizocera picturata (Simon, 1893)

Species of spider

Merizocera picturata, is a species of spiders of the family Psilodercidae. It is endemic to Sri Lanka.
