= Psiloderces elasticus =

Scientific classification
- Kingdom: Animalia
- Phylum: Arthropoda
- Subphylum: Chelicerata
- Class: Arachnida
- Order: Araneae
- Infraorder: Araneomorphae
- Family: Psilodercidae
- Genus: Psiloderces
- Species: P. elasticus

Binomial name
- Psiloderces elasticus (Brignoli, 1975)

Species of spider

Psiloderces elasticus is a species of spider of the genus Psiloderces. It is endemic to Sri Lanka.
