= Althepus stonei =

Scientific classification
- Domain: Eukaryota
- Kingdom: Animalia
- Phylum: Arthropoda
- Subphylum: Chelicerata
- Class: Arachnida
- Order: Araneae
- Infraorder: Araneomorphae
- Family: Psilodercidae
- Genus: Althepus
- Species: A. stonei

Binomial name
- Althepus stonei Deeleman-Reinhold, 1995

Species of spider

Althepus stonei is a species of spider of the genus Althepus.

== Distribution ==
The species is endemic to Thailand. It is found in the cave Tham Nam Hua Ru Kua in Muang District in the Mae Hong Son Province and the Chiang Dao District in Chiang Mai Province.
