= Speocera jacquemarti =

Scientific classification
- Kingdom: Animalia
- Phylum: Arthropoda
- Subphylum: Chelicerata
- Class: Arachnida
- Order: Araneae
- Infraorder: Araneomorphae
- Family: Ochyroceratidae
- Genus: Speocera
- Species: S. jacquemarti

Binomial name
- Speocera jacquemarti Baert & Maelfait, 1986

Species of spider

Speocera jacquemarti is a species of spider of the family Ochyroceratidae. It is endemic to the Galápagos Islands.
