= Althepus minimus =

Scientific classification
- Domain: Eukaryota
- Kingdom: Animalia
- Phylum: Arthropoda
- Subphylum: Chelicerata
- Class: Arachnida
- Order: Araneae
- Infraorder: Araneomorphae
- Family: Psilodercidae
- Genus: Althepus
- Species: A. minimus

Binomial name
- Althepus minimus Deeleman-Reinhold, 1995

Species of spider

Althepus minimus is a species of spider of the genus Althepus.

== Distribution ==
The species is endemic to Sumatra in Indonesia. It is found at Kerinci Seblat National Park.
