= Althepus tibiatus =

Scientific classification
- Domain: Eukaryota
- Kingdom: Animalia
- Phylum: Arthropoda
- Subphylum: Chelicerata
- Class: Arachnida
- Order: Araneae
- Infraorder: Araneomorphae
- Family: Psilodercidae
- Genus: Althepus
- Species: A. tibiatus

Binomial name
- Althepus tibiatus Deeleman-Reinhold, 1985

Species of spider

Althepus tibiatus is a species of spider of the genus Althepus.

== Distribution ==
The species is endemic to Chiang Mai Province in Thailand. It is found at Tham Chiang Dao and Tham Pha Deng caves.
