= Althepus suhartoi =

Scientific classification
- Kingdom: Animalia
- Phylum: Arthropoda
- Subphylum: Chelicerata
- Class: Arachnida
- Order: Araneae
- Infraorder: Araneomorphae
- Family: Psilodercidae
- Genus: Althepus
- Species: A. suhartoi

Binomial name
- Althepus suhartoi Deeleman-Reinhold, 1985

Species of spider

Althepus suhartoi is a species of spider of the genus Althepus, named after Suharto. It is endemic to Sumatra in Indonesia.
