= Merizocera oryzae =

Scientific classification
- Kingdom: Animalia
- Phylum: Arthropoda
- Subphylum: Chelicerata
- Class: Arachnida
- Order: Araneae
- Infraorder: Araneomorphae
- Family: Psilodercidae
- Genus: Merizocera
- Species: M. oryzae

Binomial name
- Merizocera oryzae Brignoli, 1975

Species of spider

Merizocera oryzae, is a species of spider of the family Psilodercidae. It is endemic to Sri Lanka.
