= Leclercera =

Scientific classification
- Kingdom: Animalia
- Phylum: Arthropoda
- Subphylum: Chelicerata
- Class: Arachnida
- Order: Araneae
- Infraorder: Araneomorphae
- Family: Psilodercidae
- Genus: Leclercera; Deeleman-Reinhold, 1995

Type species
- Leclercera khaoyai Deeleman-Reinhold, 1995

Species
- 43, see text

Genus of spiders

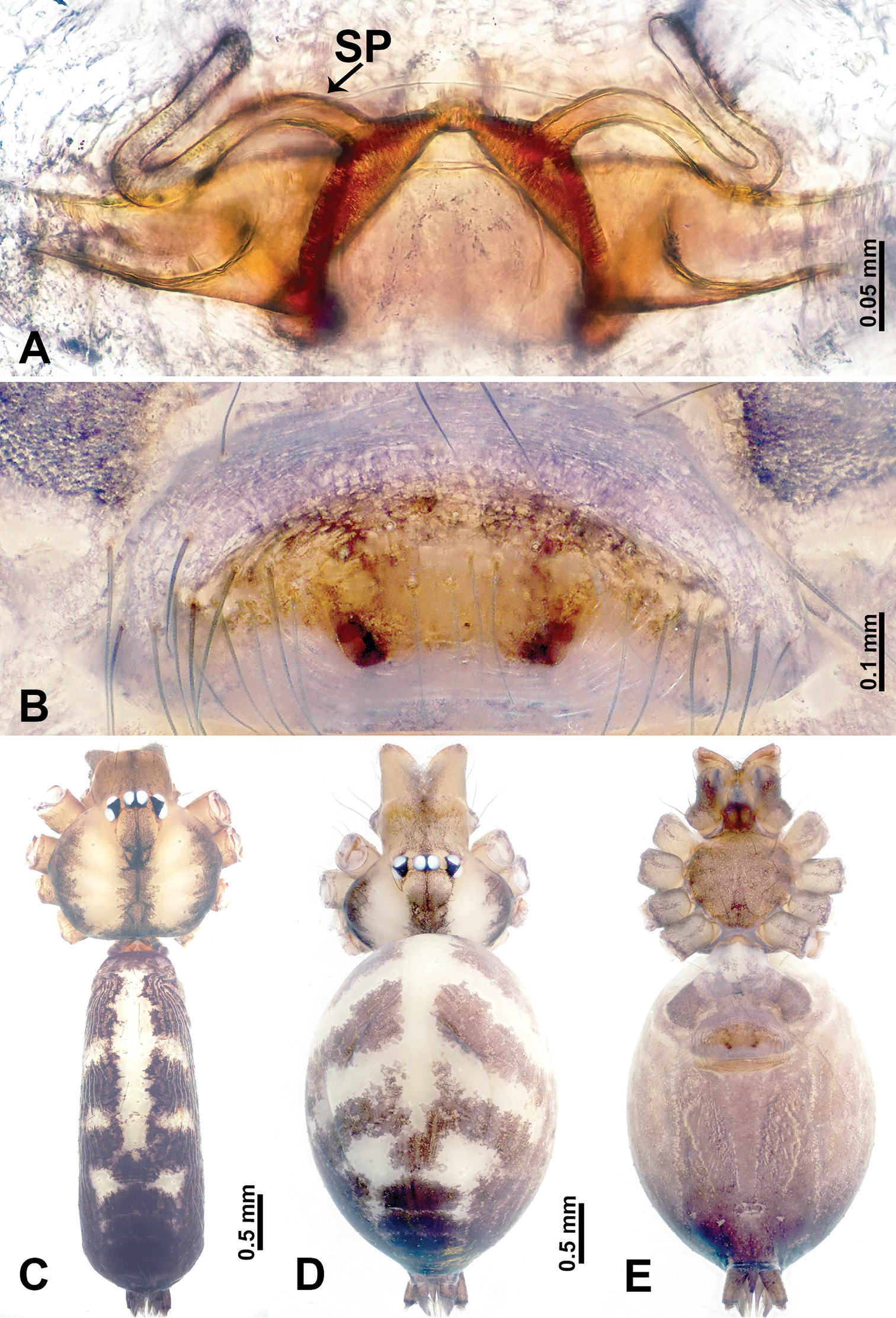
Leclercera aniensis sp. nov., male holotype and female paratype. A Endogyne, dorsal view B female epigastric area, ventral view C male habitus, dorsal view D female habitus, dorsal view E female habitus, ventral view. Abbreviation: SP = spermatheca

Leclercera is a genus of spiders in the family Psilodercidae found in Asia, including Thailand, Nepal, China and the Philippines. It was first described in 1995 by Christa L. Deeleman-Reinhold, who named it after a fellow collector of Asian spiders. She originally placed under Ochyroceratidae, but it was later moved it to Psilodercidae. It is named for Philippe Leclerc, a collector of spiders in southeast Asia.

Members of this genus are usually larger than those in Psiloderces and Merizocera, but can also be distinguished by teeth on the retromargin of the chelicerae (behind the fang), a round maxillae, and a longer labium. They can be distinguished from Althepus by the rounded posterior margin of the carapace and a shallow fovea that doesn't quite reach the posterior thoracic margin, among other factors.

== Species ==
As of February 2022, it contains forty-three species from Asia:

- Leclercera aniensis Chang & Li, 2020 — China
- Leclercera banensis Chang & Li, 2020 — Thailand
- Leclercera duandai Chang & Li, 2020 — China
- Leclercera duibaensis Chang & Li, 2020 — China
- Leclercera dumuzhou Chang & Li, 2020 — Thailand
- Leclercera ekteenensis Chang & Li, 2020 — Nepal
- Leclercera hponensis Chang & Li, 2020 — Myanmar
- Leclercera jianzuiyu Chang & Li, 2020 — Thailand
- Leclercera jiazhongensis Chang & Li, 2020 — China
- Leclercera khaoyai Deeleman-Reinhold, 1995 (type) — Thailand
- Leclercera lizi Chang & Li, 2020 — China
- Leclercera longiventris Deeleman-Reinhold, 1995 — Thailand
- Leclercera machadoi (Brignoli, 1973) — Nepal
- Leclercera maochong Chang & Li, 2020 — China
- Leclercera mianqiu Chang & Li, 2020 — Indonesia (Sulawesi)
- Leclercera mulcata (Brignoli, 1973) — Nepal
- Leclercera nagarjunensis F. Y. Li & S. Q. Li, 2018 — Nepal
- Leclercera negros Deeleman-Reinhold, 1995 — Philippines
- Leclercera niuqu F. Y. Li & S. Q. Li, 2018 — Nepal
- Leclercera ocellata Deeleman-Reinhold, 1995 — Borneo
- Leclercera paiensis Chang & Li, 2020 — China
- Leclercera pulongensis Chang & Li, 2020 — China
- Leclercera renqinensis Chang & Li, 2020 — China
- Leclercera sanjiao Chang & Li, 2020 — China
- Leclercera selasihensis Chang & Li, 2020 — Indonesia (Sumatra)
- Leclercera shanzi Chang & Li, 2020 — China
- Leclercera shergylaensis Chang & Li, 2020 — China
- Leclercera sidai F. Y. Li & S. Q. Li, 2018 — Nepal
- Leclercera spinata Deeleman-Reinhold, 1995 — Indonesia (Sulawesi)
- Leclercera suwanensis Chang & Li, 2020 — Thailand
- Leclercera thamkaewensis Chang & Li, 2020 — Thailand
- Leclercera thamsangensis Chang & Li, 2020 — Thailand
- Leclercera tudao Chang & Li, 2020 — China
- Leclercera undulata Wang & Li, 2013 — China
- Leclercera xiangbabang Chang & Li, 2020 — Thailand
- Leclercera xiaodai Chang & Li, 2020 — China
- Leclercera yamaensis Chang & Li, 2020 — Thailand
- Leclercera yandou Chang & Li, 2020 — Malaysia (Peninsula)
- Leclercera yanjing Chang & Li, 2020 — China
- Leclercera yuanzhui Chang & Li, 2020 — China
- Leclercera zanggaensis Chang & Li, 2020 — China
- Leclercera zhamensis Chang & Li, 2020 — China
- Leclercera zhaoi F. Y. Li & S. Q. Li, 2018 — Nepal
