= Sinoderces =

Scientific classification
- Domain: Eukaryota
- Kingdom: Animalia
- Phylum: Arthropoda
- Subphylum: Chelicerata
- Class: Arachnida
- Order: Araneae
- Infraorder: Araneomorphae
- Family: Psilodercidae
- Genus: Sinoderces; F. Y. Li & S. Q. Li, 2017

Type species
- Sinoderces nawanensis F. Y. Li & S. Q. Li, 2017

Species
- 12, see text

Genus of spiders

Sinoderces is a genus of spiders from Thailand in the family Psilodercidae first described in 2017.

== Species ==
As of July 2022 it contains twelve species:

- Sinoderces aiensis F. Y. Li & S. Q. Li, 2019 – China
- Sinoderces dewaroopensis F. Y. Li & S. Q. Li, 2019 – Thailand
- Sinoderces exilis (Wang & Li, 2013) – China
- Sinoderces khanensis F. Y. Li & S. Q. Li, 2019 – Laos
- Sinoderces kieoensis F. Y. Li & S. Q. Li, 2019 – Laos
- Sinoderces luohanensis F. Y. Li & S. Q. Li, 2019 – China
- Sinoderces nawanensis F. Y. Li & S. Q. Li, 2017 – China
- Sinoderces phathaoensis F. Y. Li & S. Q. Li, 2019 – Laos
- Sinoderces saraburiensis F. Y. Li & S. Q. Li, 2019 – Thailand
- Sinoderces taichi F. Y. Li & S. Q. Li, 2019 – China
- Sinoderces wenshanensis F. Y. Li & S. Q. Li, 2019 – China
- Sinoderces xueae F. Y. Li & S. Q. Li, 2019 – China
