= Roche roche =

Conservation status
- Vulnerable (IUCN 3.1)

Scientific classification
- Kingdom: Animalia
- Phylum: Arthropoda
- Subphylum: Chelicerata
- Class: Arachnida
- Order: Araneae
- Infraorder: Araneomorphae
- Family: Ochyroceratidae
- Genus: Roche; Saaristo, 1998
- Species: R. roche

Binomial name
- Roche roche Saaristo, 1998

Species of spider

Roche roche is a species of spiders in the family Ochyroceratidae. It was first described in 1998 by Michael Saaristo. As of 2021, it is the only species in the genus Roche. It is found in the Seychelles.
