= Theotima =

Scientific classification
- Kingdom: Animalia
- Phylum: Arthropoda
- Subphylum: Chelicerata
- Class: Arachnida
- Order: Araneae
- Infraorder: Araneomorphae
- Family: Ochyroceratidae
- Genus: Theotima; Simon, 1893

Species
- See text

Diversity
- 16 species

Genus of spiders

Theotima is a genus of small spiders in the family Ochyroceratidae.

== Species ==
- Theotima elva Gertsch, 1977 (Mexico)
- Theotima fallax Fage, 1912 (Cuba, St. Vincent, Venezuela)
- Theotima galapagosensis Baert & Maelfait, 1986 (Galapagos Is.)
- Theotima jeanneli Machado, 1951 (Angola)
- Theotima kivuensis Machado, 1964 (Congo)
- Theotima lawrencei Machado, 1964 (Congo)
- Theotima makua Gertsch, 1973 (Hawaii)
- Theotima martha Gertsch, 1977 (Mexico)
- Theotima mbamensis Baert, 1985 (Cameroon)
- Theotima minutissima (Petrunkevitch, 1929) (tropical America, Asia, and Pacific Is.)
- Theotima mirabilis Machado, 1951 (Angola)
- Theotima moxicensis Machado, 1951 (Angola)
- Theotima pura Gertsch, 1973 (Mexico)
- Theotima radiata (Simon, 1891) (Cuba, Puerto Rico, Venezuela)
- Theotima ruina Gertsch, 1977 (Mexico)
- Theotima tchabalensis Baert, 1985 (Cameroon)
