= Psiloochyrocera =

Scientific classification
- Domain: Eukaryota
- Kingdom: Animalia
- Phylum: Arthropoda
- Subphylum: Chelicerata
- Class: Arachnida
- Order: Araneae
- Infraorder: Araneomorphae
- Family: Ochyroceratidae
- Genus: Psiloochyrocera; Baert

Species
- Psiloochyrocera cajanuma Baert, 2014; Psiloochyrocera tortilis Dupérré, 2015

Genus of spiders

Psiloochyrocera is a genus of spiders in the family Ochyroceratidae. It was first described in 2014 by Baert. As of 2016, it contains 2 species, both found in Ecuador.
