= Lundacera =

Scientific classification
- Domain: Eukaryota
- Kingdom: Animalia
- Phylum: Arthropoda
- Subphylum: Chelicerata
- Class: Arachnida
- Order: Araneae
- Infraorder: Araneomorphae
- Family: Ochyroceratidae
- Genus: Lundacera
- Species: L. tchikapensis

Binomial name
- Lundacera tchikapensis Machado, 1951

Genus of spiders

Lundacera is a genus of spiders in the family Ochyroceratidae. It was first described in 1951 by Machado. As of 2017, it contains only one species, Lundacera tchikapensis, found in Angola.
