= Speocera =

Scientific classification
- Domain: Eukaryota
- Kingdom: Animalia
- Phylum: Arthropoda
- Subphylum: Chelicerata
- Class: Arachnida
- Order: Araneae
- Infraorder: Araneomorphae
- Family: Ochyroceratidae
- Genus: Speocera; Berland, 1914

Type species
- Speocera pallida Berland, 1914

Species
- See text

Diversity
- 89 species

Genus of spiders

Speocera is a genus of six eyed spiders in the family Ochyroceratidae.

== Species ==
As of July 2022 it contains eighty-nine species:

- Speocera amazonica Brignoli, 1978 — Brazil
- Speocera amber F. Y. Li & S. Q. Li, 2019 — Madagascar
- Speocera ankalana F. Y. Li & S. Q. Li, 2019 — Madagascar
- Speocera apo Deeleman-Reinhold, 1995 — Philippines
- Speocera asymmetrica Tong & Li, 2007 — China
- Speocera babau Brescovit, Zampaulo, Cizauskas & Pedroso, 2022 — Brazil
- Speocera bachma F. Y. Li & S. Q. Li, 2019 — Vietnam
- Speocera balikpapan F. Y. Li & S. Q. Li, 2019 — Indonesia
- Speocera ballarini F. Y. Li & S. Q. Li, 2019 — Philippines
- Speocera bambusicola Brignoli, 1980 — Kenya
- Speocera batang F. Y. Li & S. Q. Li, 2019 — Indonesia
- Speocera bawangling F. Y. Li & S. Q. Li, 2019 — China
- Speocera berlandi (Machado, 1951) — Angola
- Speocera bicornea Tong & Li, 2007 — China
- Speocera bioforestae Dupérré, 2015 — Ecuador
- Speocera bismarcki (Brignoli, 1976) — Bismarck Archipel
- Speocera bontoc F. Y. Li & S. Q. Li, 2019 — Philippines
- Speocera bosmansi Baert, 1988 — Sulawesi
- Speocera bovenlanden Deeleman-Reinhold, 1995 — Sumatra
- Speocera bukittinggi F. Y. Li & S. Q. Li, 2019 — Indonesia
- Speocera bulbiformis Lin, Pham & Li, 2009 — Vietnam
- Speocera caeca Deeleman-Reinhold, 1995 — Sulawesi
- Speocera capra Deeleman-Reinhold, 1995 — Thailand
- Speocera cattien F. Y. Li & S. Q. Li, 2019 — Vietnam
- Speocera crassibulba Deeleman-Reinhold, 1995 — Java
- Speocera cucphuong F. Y. Li & S. Q. Li, 2019 — Vietnam
- Speocera cuyapo F. Y. Li & S. Q. Li, 2019 — Philippines
- Speocera dayakorum Deeleman-Reinhold, 1995 — Borneo
- Speocera debundschaensis Baert, 1985 — Cameroon
- Speocera decui Dumitrescu & Georgescu, 1992 — Cuba
- Speocera deharvengi Deeleman-Reinhold, 1995 — Thailand
- Speocera dongjing F. Y. Li & S. Q. Li, 2019 — China
- Speocera eleonorae Baptista, 2003 — Brazil
- Speocera fagei (Berland, 1914) — Kenya
- Speocera feminina (Machado, 1951) — Angola
- Speocera gexuejuni F. Y. Li & S. Q. Li, 2019 — China
- Speocera griswoldi F. Y. Li & S. Q. Li, 2019 — Madagascar
- Speocera heilan F. Y. Li & S. Q. Li, 2019 — China
- Speocera huifengi F. Y. Li & S. Q. Li, 2019 — Thailand
- Speocera huisun F. Y. Li & S. Q. Li, 2019 — Taiwan
- Speocera indulgens Deeleman-Reinhold, 1995 — Sulawesi
- Speocera irritans Brignoli, 1978 — Brazil
- Speocera jacquemarti Baert & Maelfait, 1986 — Galapagos Islands
- Speocera javana (Simon, 1905) — Java, Seychelles
- Speocera jucunda Brignoli, 1979 — Brazil
- Speocera karkari (Baert, 1980) — Philippines, Sulawesi, New Guinea
- Speocera krikkeni Brignoli, 1977 — Sumatra
- Speocera lahrak F. Y. Li & S. Q. Li, 2019 — Thailand
- Speocera laureata Komatsu, 1974 — Ryukyu Islands
- Speocera leclerci Deeleman-Reinhold, 1995 — Thailand
- Speocera longyan F. Y. Li & S. Q. Li, 2019 — China
- Speocera manhao F. Y. Li & S. Q. Li, 2019 — China
- Speocera melinh F. Y. Li & S. Q. Li, 2019 — Vietnam
- Speocera microphthalma (Simon, 1892) — Philippines
- Speocera minuta (Marples, 1955) — Samoa, Tokelau, Niue
- Speocera molesta Brignoli, 1978 — Brazil
- Speocera musgo Dupérré, 2015 — Ecuador
- Speocera naumachiae Brignoli, 1980 — Thailand
- Speocera nuichua F. Y. Li & S. Q. Li, 2019 — Vietnam
- Speocera octodentis Tong & Li, 2007 — China
- Speocera onorei Baert, 2014 — Ecuador
- Speocera pallida Berland, 1914 — East Africa
- Speocera papuana (Baert, 1980) — New Guinea
- Speocera parva Deeleman-Reinhold, 1995 — Borneo
- Speocera payakumbuh F. Y. Li & S. Q. Li, 2019 — Indonesia
- Speocera phangngaensis Deeleman-Reinhold, 1995 — Thailand
- Speocera pinima Brescovit, Zampaulo, Cizauskas & Pedroso, 2022 — Brazil
- Speocera piquira Brescovit, Zampaulo, Cizauskas & Pedroso, 2022 — Brazil
- Speocera pongo Deeleman-Reinhold, 1995 — Borneo
- Speocera ranongensis Deeleman-Reinhold, 1995 — Thailand
- Speocera songae Tong & Li, 2007 — China
- Speocera stellafera Deeleman-Reinhold, 1995 — Thailand, Malaysia
- Speocera suea F. Y. Li & S. Q. Li, 2019 — Thailand
- Speocera suratthaniensis Deeleman-Reinhold, 1995 — Thailand
- Speocera tabuk F. Y. Li & S. Q. Li, 2019 — Philippines
- Speocera taprobanica Brignoli, 1981 — Sri Lanka
- Speocera tongyaoi Lin & Li, 2022 — China
- Speocera transleuser Deeleman-Reinhold, 1995 — Sumatra
- Speocera trapezialis F. Y. Li & S. Q. Li, 2019 — Vietnam
- Speocera troglobia Deeleman-Reinhold, 1995 — Thailand
- Speocera trusmadi F. Y. Li & S. Q. Li, 2019 — Malaysia
- Speocera tubularis F. Y. Li & S. Q. Li, 2019 — Madagascar
- Speocera vilhenai Machado, 1951 — Angola
- Speocera violacea Dupérré, 2015 — Ecuador
- Speocera wangi Lin & Li, 2022 — China
- Speocera xiaoxiaoae F. Y. Li & S. Q. Li, 2019 — China
- Speocera xuanson F. Y. Li & S. Q. Li, 2019 — Vietnam
- Speocera zhigangi F. Y. Li & S. Q. Li, 2019 — China
