= Luzonacera =

Scientific classification
- Domain: Eukaryota
- Kingdom: Animalia
- Phylum: Arthropoda
- Subphylum: Chelicerata
- Class: Arachnida
- Order: Araneae
- Infraorder: Araneomorphae
- Family: Psilodercidae
- Genus: Luzonacera; F. Y. Li & S. Q. Li, 2017

Type species
- Luzonacera chang

Species
- Luzonacera chang F. Y. Li & S. Q. Li, 2017; Luzonacera duan F. Y. Li & S. Q. Li, 2017; Luzonacera francescoballarini F. Y. Li & S. Q. Li, 2019; Luzonacera lattuensis F. Y. Li & S. Q. Li, 2019; Luzonacera peterjaegeri F. Y. Li & S. Q. Li, 2019
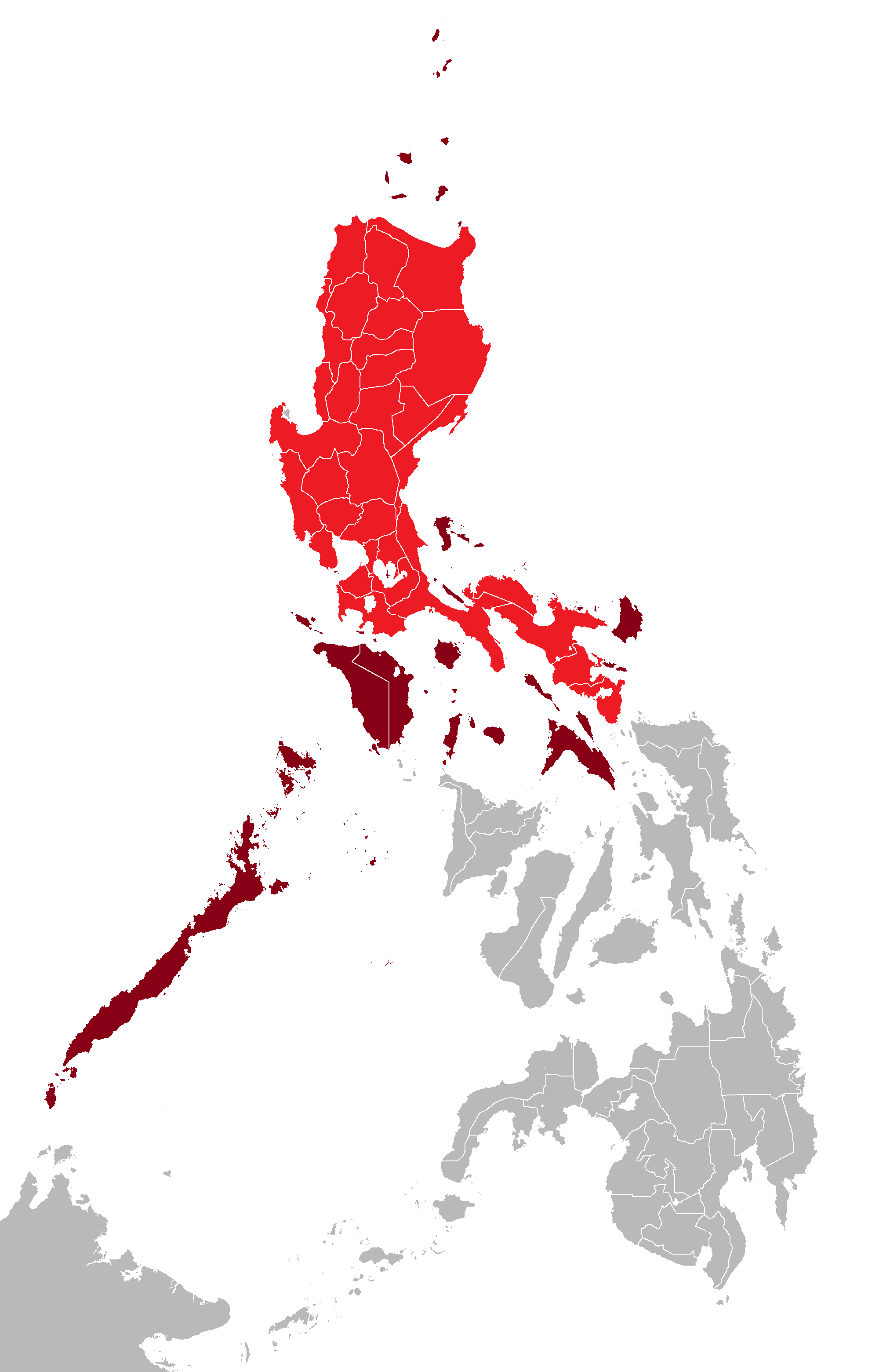
- Luzon Island (Philippines)

Genus of spiders in the family Psilodercidae

Luzonacera is a genus of spiders in the family Psilodercidae. It was erected by Feng-Yuan Li and Shu-Qiang Li in 2017. As of February 2019, it contains five species found on the Philippine island of Luzon.
