= Theotima minutissima =

Scientific classification
- Domain: Eukaryota
- Kingdom: Animalia
- Phylum: Arthropoda
- Subphylum: Chelicerata
- Class: Arachnida
- Order: Araneae
- Infraorder: Araneomorphae
- Family: Ochyroceratidae
- Genus: Theotima
- Species: T. minutissima

Binomial name
- Theotima minutissima (Petrunkevitch, 1929)

Species of spider

Theotima minutissima is a minute (0.9mm) spider.

== Distribution ==
With a pantropical distributionT. minutissima occurs in Panama, the Philippines, Indonesia, Thailand and Guam. It is especially abundant in the tropical forest leaf litter on El Yunque, Puerto Rico.

However, with more than a thousand specimens collected over many years, none has ever been a male. It is now known that at least this species, and possibly others in the genus Theotima, reproduce parthenogenetically.

Its preferred habitat is litter composed of smaller leaves in second growth forests with understory shrubs or in those forests with damper and more easily decayed leaves such as mahogany. The species prefers elevations less than 800m.
