= Euso muehlenbergi =

Conservation status
- Critically Endangered (IUCN 3.1)

Scientific classification
- Kingdom: Animalia
- Phylum: Arthropoda
- Subphylum: Chelicerata
- Class: Arachnida
- Order: Araneae
- Infraorder: Araneomorphae
- Family: Ochyroceratidae
- Genus: Euso; Saaristo, 2001
- Species: E. muehlenbergi

Binomial name
- Euso muehlenbergi (Saaristo, 1998)

Species of spider

Euso muehlenbergi is a species of spiders in the family Ochyroceratidae. It was first described in 1998 by Michael Saaristo. As of 2021, it is the only species in the genus Euso, erected by Michael Saaristo in 2001. It is found in the Seychelles.
