= Ouette (spider) =

Scientific classification
- Domain: Eukaryota
- Kingdom: Animalia
- Phylum: Arthropoda
- Subphylum: Chelicerata
- Class: Arachnida
- Order: Araneae
- Infraorder: Araneomorphae
- Family: Ochyroceratidae
- Genus: Ouette; Saaristo

Species
- See text.

Genus of spiders

Ouette is a genus of spiders in the family Ochyroceratidae. It was first described in 1998 by Michael Saaristo. As of 2021, it contained 2 species:

- Ouette gyrus Tong & Li, 2007 – China
- Ouette ouette Saaristo, 1998 – Seychelles
