= Qiongocera =

Scientific classification
- Kingdom: Animalia
- Phylum: Arthropoda
- Subphylum: Chelicerata
- Class: Arachnida
- Order: Araneae
- Infraorder: Araneomorphae
- Family: Psilodercidae
- Genus: Qiongocera; F. Y. Li & S. Q. Li, 2017
- Species: Q. hongjunensis

Binomial name
- Qiongocera hongjunensis F. Y. Li & S. Q. Li, 2017

Genus of spiders

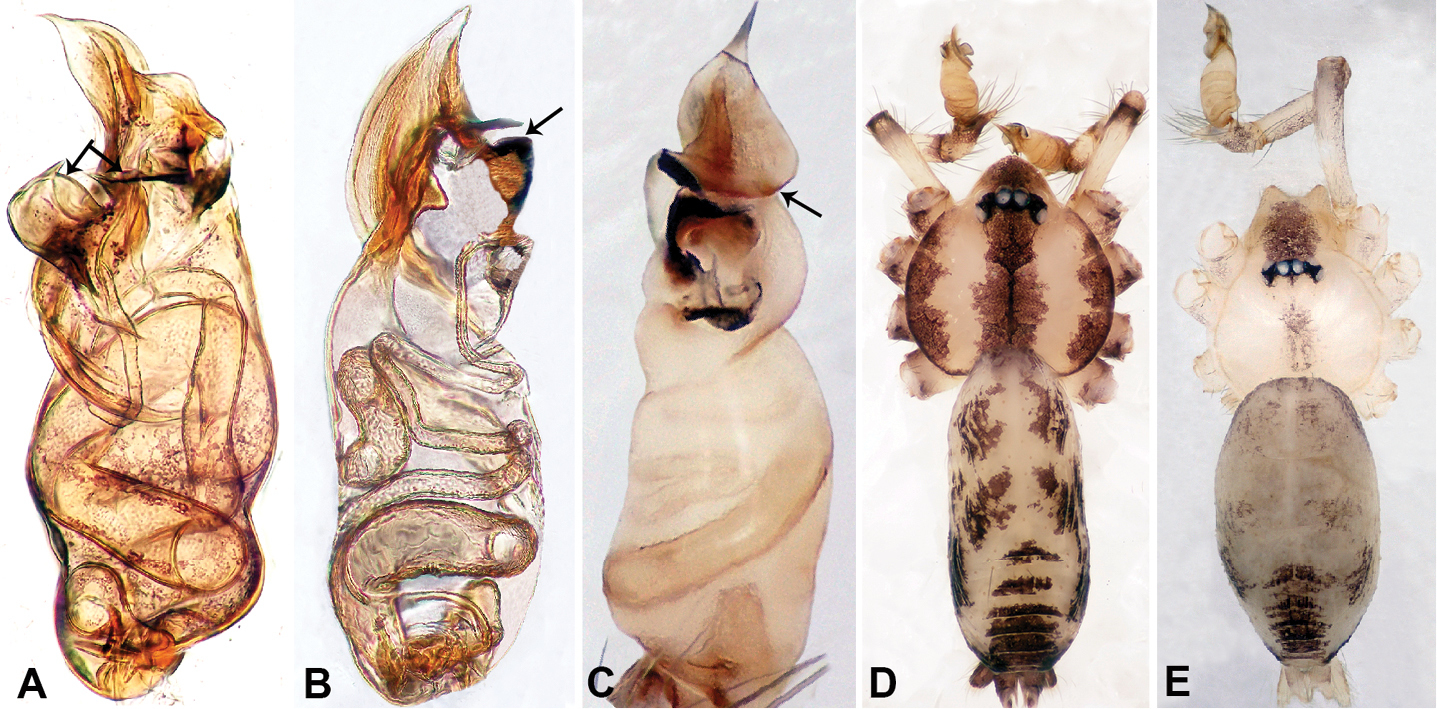
Bulb and habitus of Qiongocera specimens

Qiongocera is a genus of Southeast Asian araneomorph spiders in the family Psilodercidae, containing the single species, Qiongocera hongjunensis. It was first described by F. Y. Li & S. Q. Li in 2017, and has only been found in China.
