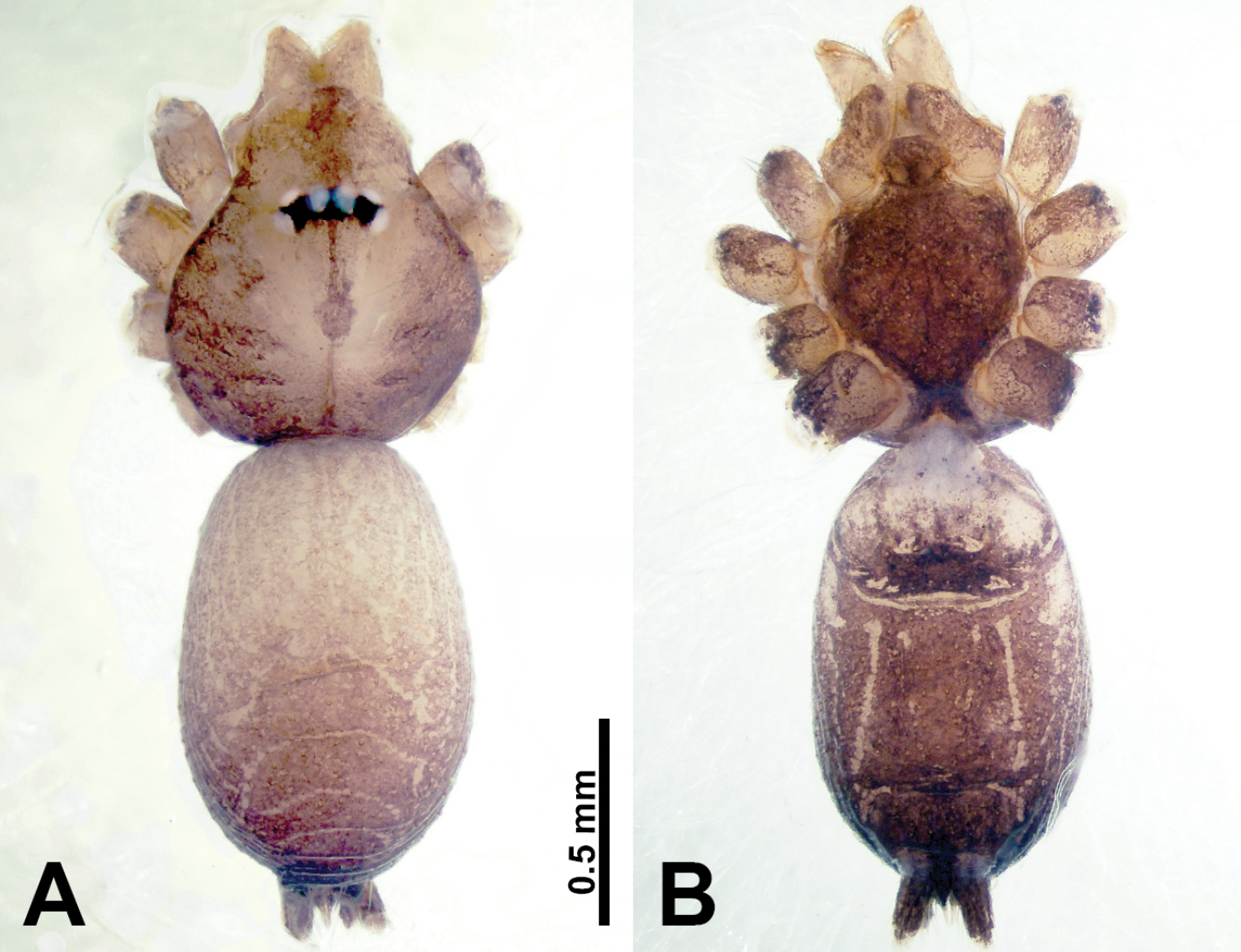
- Preserved specimen of male Thaiderces peterjaegeri

Scientific classification
- Domain: Eukaryota
- Kingdom: Animalia
- Phylum: Arthropoda
- Subphylum: Chelicerata
- Class: Arachnida
- Order: Araneae
- Infraorder: Araneomorphae
- Family: Psilodercidae
- Genus: Thaiderces; F. Y. Li & S. Q. Li, 2017

Type species
- Thaiderces jian F. Y. Li & S. Q. Li, 2017

Species
- 18, see text

= Thaiderces =

Genus of spiders

Thaiderces is a genus of spiders from Southeast Asia in the family Psilodercidae, first described in 2017.

== Species ==
As of July 2022 it contains eighteen species:

- Thaiderces chujiao Li & Chang, 2019 – Thailand
- Thaiderces djojosudharmoi (Deeleman-Reinhold, 1995) – Indonesia
- Thaiderces fengniao Li & Chang, 2019 – Thailand
- Thaiderces ganlan Li & Chang, 2019 – Myanmar
- Thaiderces haima Li & Chang, 2019 – Thailand
- Thaiderces jian F. Y. Li & S. Q. Li, 2017 – Thailand
- Thaiderces jiazi Li & Chang, 2019 – Thailand
- Thaiderces miantiao Li & Chang, 2019 – Thailand
- Thaiderces ngalauindahensis Li & Chang, 2019 – Indonesia
- Thaiderces peterjaegeri Li & Chang, 2019 – Thailand
- Thaiderces rimbu (Deeleman-Reinhold, 1995) – Indonesia
- Thaiderces shuzi Li & Chang, 2019 – Thailand
- Thaiderces thamphadaengensis Li & Chang, 2019 – Thailand
- Thaiderces thamphrikensis Li & Chang, 2019 – Thailand
- Thaiderces tuoyuan Li & Chang, 2019 – Thailand
- Thaiderces vulgaris (Deeleman-Reinhold, 1995) – Thailand
- Thaiderces yangcong Li & Chang, 2019 – Indonesia
- Thaiderces zuichun Li & Chang, 2019 – Thailand
