= Priscaleclercera =

Priscaleclercera Temporal range: Late Cretaceous, 99 Ma

Scientific classification
- Kingdom: Animalia
- Phylum: Arthropoda
- Subphylum: Chelicerata
- Class: Arachnida
- Order: Araneae
- Infraorder: Araneomorphae
- Family: Psilodercidae
- Genus: †Priscaleclercera; Wunderlich, 2017

Species
- See text

Genus of spiders

Priscaleclercera is a genus of araneomorph spiders in the family Psilodercidae, containing seven species. The genus was first described by Jorge Wunderlich in 2017, and its fossils have been found in Burmese amber, while live specimens have been found in Indonesia (Sulawesi).

== Species ==
- †P. brevispinae Wunderlich, 2017
- †P. christae Magalhaes et al., 2021
- †P. ellenbergeri (Wunderlich, 2015) (syn: "Leclercera" ellenbergeri Wunderlich, 2015)
- †P. longissipes (Wunderlich, 2012) (syn: "Leclercera" longissipes Wunderlich, 2012)
- †P. paucispinae Wunderlich, 2017
- †P. sexaculeata (Wunderlich, 2015) (syn: "Leclercera" sexaculeata Wunderlich, 2015)
- †P. spicula (Wunderlich, 2012) (syn: "Leclercera" spicula (Wunderlich, 2012))
- P spinata (Deeleman-Reinhold, 1995) (syn: "Leclercera" spinata (Deleeman-Reinhold, 1995))
