= Relictocera =

Scientific classification
- Domain: Eukaryota
- Kingdom: Animalia
- Phylum: Arthropoda
- Subphylum: Chelicerata
- Class: Arachnida
- Order: Araneae
- Infraorder: Araneomorphae
- Family: Psilodercidae
- Genus: Relictocera; F. Y. Li & S. Q. Li, 2017

Type species
- Relictocera qiyi F. Y. Li & S. Q. Li, 2017

Species
- 5, see text

Genus of spiders

Relictocera is a genus of spiders from Southeast Asia in the family Psilodercidae, first described in 2017.

== Species ==
As of July 2022 it contains five species:

- Relictocera mus (Deeleman-Reinhold, 1995) – Thailand
- Relictocera qianzi F. Y. Li & S. Q. Li, 2019 – Thailand
- Relictocera qiyi F. Y. Li & S. Q. Li, 2017 – Vietnam
- Relictocera sigen F. Y. Li & S. Q. Li, 2019 – Vietnam
- Relictocera wugen F. Y. Li & S. Q. Li, 2019 – Vietnam
