= Dundocera =

Scientific classification
- Domain: Eukaryota
- Kingdom: Animalia
- Phylum: Arthropoda
- Subphylum: Chelicerata
- Class: Arachnida
- Order: Araneae
- Infraorder: Araneomorphae
- Family: Ochyroceratidae
- Genus: Dundocera; Machado

Species
- Dundocera angolana (Machado, 1951); Dundocera fagei Machado, 1951; Dundocera gabelensis (Machado, 1951)

Genus of spiders

Dundocera is a genus of spiders in the family Ochyroceratidae. It was first described in 1951 by Machado. As of 2016, it contains 3 species, all from Angola.
