= Merizocera =

Scientific classification
- Domain: Eukaryota
- Kingdom: Animalia
- Phylum: Arthropoda
- Subphylum: Chelicerata
- Class: Arachnida
- Order: Araneae
- Infraorder: Araneomorphae
- Family: Psilodercidae
- Genus: Merizocera; Fage, 1912

Type species
- Merizocera cruciata

Species
- 35 species (see text)

Genus of spiders

Merizocera is a genus of six eyed spiders in the family Psilodercidae, first described by Louis Fage in 1912.

== Species ==
As of January 2021, the World Spider Catalog accepts the following species:

- Merizocera baoshan Li, 2020 – China
- Merizocera betong Li, 2020 – Thailand
- Merizocera brincki Brignoli, 1975 – Sri Lanka
- Merizocera colombo Li, 2020 – Sri Lanka
- Merizocera crinita (Fage, 1929) – Malaysia
- Merizocera cruciata (Simon, 1893) (type species) – Sri Lanka
- Merizocera galle Li, 2020 – Sri Lanka
- Merizocera hponkanrazi Li, 2020 – Myanmar
- Merizocera kachin Li, 2020 – Myanmar
- Merizocera kandy Li, 2020 – Sri Lanka
- Merizocera krabi Li, 2020 – Thailand
- Merizocera kurunegala Li, 2020 – Sri Lanka
- Merizocera lincang Li, 2020 – China
- Merizocera mainling Li, 2020 – China
- Merizocera mandai Li, 2020 – Singapore
- Merizocera nyingchi Li, 2020 – China
- Merizocera oryzae Brignoli, 1975 – Sri Lanka
- Merizocera peraderiya Li, 2020 – Sri Lanka
- Merizocera phuket Li, 2020 – Thailand
- Merizocera picturata (Simon, 1893) – Sri Lanka
- Merizocera putao Li, 2020 – Myanmar
- Merizocera pygmaea Deeleman-Reinhold, 1995 – Thailand
- Merizocera ranong Li, 2020 – Thailand
- Merizocera ratnapura Li, 2020 – Sri Lanka
- Merizocera salawa Li, 2020 – Sri Lanka
- Merizocera stellata (Simon, 1905) – Indonesia (Java)
- Merizocera tak Li, 2020 – Thailand
- Merizocera tanintharyi Li, 2020 – Myanmar
- Merizocera tengchong Li, 2020 – China
- Merizocera thenna Li, 2020 – Sri Lanka
- Merizocera uva Li, 2020 – Sri Lanka
- Merizocera wenshan Li, 2020 – China
- Merizocera wui Li, 2020 – Myanmar
- Merizocera yala Li, 2020 – Thailand
- Merizocera yuxi Li, 2020 – China
