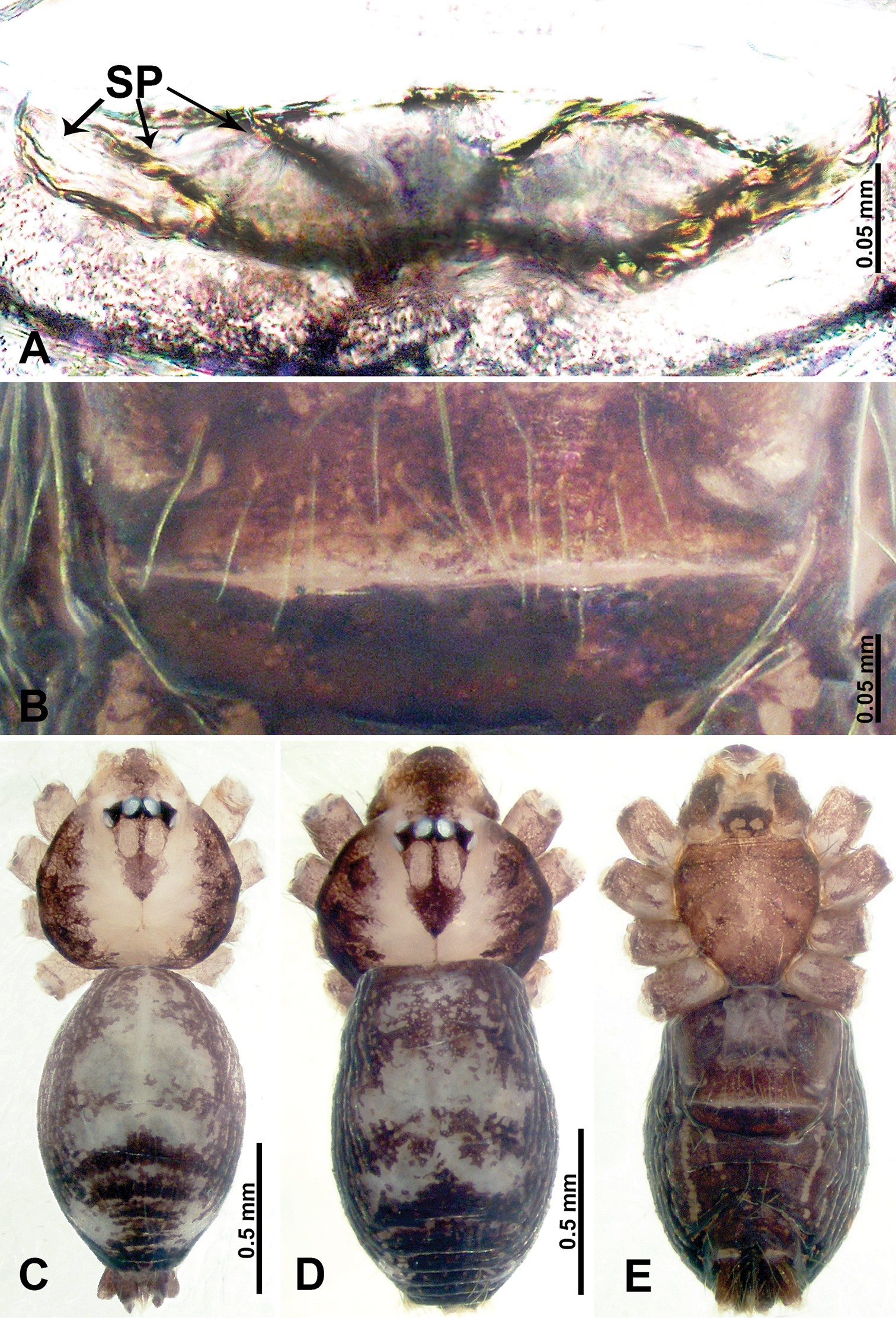

Scientific classification
- Kingdom: Animalia
- Phylum: Arthropoda
- Subphylum: Chelicerata
- Class: Arachnida
- Order: Araneae
- Infraorder: Araneomorphae
- Family: Psilodercidae
- Genus: Psiloderces; Simon, 1892

Type species
- Psiloderces egeria Simon, 1892

Species
- 38, see text

= Psiloderces =

Genus of spiders

Psiloderces is a genus of six eyed spiders in the family Psilodercidae, first described by Eugène Simon in 1892.

== Species ==
As of September 2022 it contains thirty-eight species, found in Southeast Asia:

- Psiloderces albostictus Deeleman-Reinhold, 1995 — Thailand
- Psiloderces althepoides Deeleman-Reinhold, 1995 — Borneo
- Psiloderces bangkiraiensis Li & Chang, 2020 — Borneo
- Psiloderces bolang Li & Chang, 2020 — Sulawesi
- Psiloderces bontocensis Li & Chang, 2020 — Luzon
- Psiloderces cattienensis Li & Chang, 2020 — Vietnam
- Psiloderces coronatus Deeleman-Reinhold, 1995 — Java
- Psiloderces cuyapoensis Li & Chang, 2020 — Luzon
- Psiloderces dicellocerus Li, Li & Jäger, 2014 — Flores
- Psiloderces egeria Simon, 1892 — Philippines
- Psiloderces elasticus (Brignoli, 1975) — Sri Lanka
- Psiloderces enigmatus Deeleman-Reinhold, 1995 — Borneo
- Psiloderces fredstonei Deeleman-Reinhold, 1995 — Thailand
- Psiloderces gawanaensis Li & Chang, 2020 — Luzon
- Psiloderces grohotensis Li & Chang, 2020 — Borneo
- Psiloderces heise Li & Chang, 2020 — Luzon
- Psiloderces howarthi Deeleman-Reinhold, 1995 — Thailand
- Psiloderces incomptus Wang & Li, 2013 — China
- Psiloderces kalimantan Deeleman-Reinhold, 1995 — Borneo
- Psiloderces leclerci Deeleman-Reinhold, 1995 — Sulawesi
- Psiloderces leucopygius Deeleman-Reinhold, 1995 — Sumatra
- Psiloderces ligula Baert, 1988 — Sulawesi
- Psiloderces limosa Deeleman-Reinhold, 1995 — Sumatra
- Psiloderces longipalpis Baert, 1988 — Sulawesi
- Psiloderces malinoensis Li & Chang, 2020 — Sulawesi
- Psiloderces nasicornis Baert, 1988 — Sulawesi
- Psiloderces palopoensis Li & Chang, 2020 — Sulawesi
- Psiloderces penaeorum Deeleman-Reinhold, 1995 — Thailand
- Psiloderces penajamensis Li & Chang, 2020 — Borneo
- Psiloderces pingguo Li & Chang, 2020 — Vietnam
- Psiloderces pulcher Deeleman-Reinhold, 1995 — Borneo
- Psiloderces septentrionalis Deeleman-Reinhold, 1995 — Thailand
- Psiloderces suthepensis Deeleman-Reinhold, 1995 — Thailand
- Psiloderces tesselatus Deeleman-Reinhold, 1995 — Java
- Psiloderces torajanus Deeleman-Reinhold, 1995 — Sulawesi
- Psiloderces vallicola Deeleman-Reinhold, 1995 — Sumatra
- Psiloderces wangou Li & Chang, 2020 — Sulawesi
- Psiloderces xichang Li & Chang, 2020 — Luzon
