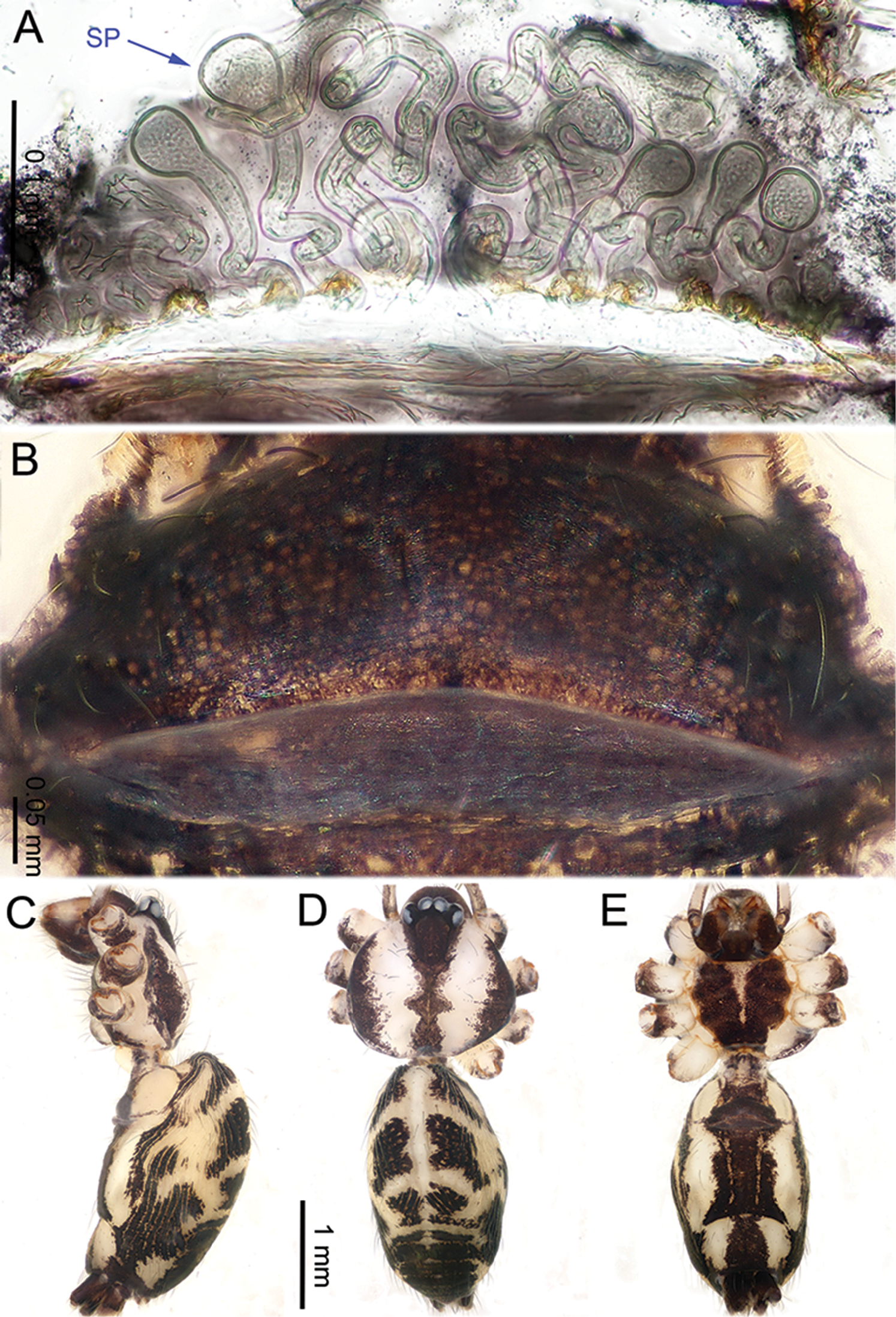
- Althepus qingyuani

Scientific classification
- Kingdom: Animalia
- Phylum: Arthropoda
- Subphylum: Chelicerata
- Class: Arachnida
- Order: Araneae
- Infraorder: Araneomorphae
- Family: Psilodercidae
- Genus: Althepus; Thorell, 1898

Species
- See text

Diversity
- 33 species

= Althepus (spider) =

Genus of spiders

Althepus is a genus of spiders in the family Psilodercidae. It was first described in 1898 by Tamerlan Thorell. As of 2019, it contains 60 species, all from Asia.

== Species ==
- Althepus bako Deeleman-Reinhold, 1995 — Borneo
- Althepus bamensis Li et al., 2018 — Thailand
- Althepus biltoni Deeleman-Reinhold, 1995 — Sulawesi
- Althepus changmao Li et al., 2018 — Thailand
- Althepus chengmenensis Li et al., 2018 — China
- Althepus cheni Li et al., 2018 — Myanmar
- Althepus christae Wang & Li, 2013 — China
- Althepus complicatus Deeleman-Reinhold, 1995 — Sumatra
- Althepus dekkingae Deeleman-Reinhold, 1995 — Java
- Althepus devraii Kulkarni & Dupérré, 2019 — India
- Althepus dongnaiensis Li et al., 2018 — Vietnam
- Althepus duan Li et al., 2017 — Thailand
- Althepus duoji Li et al., 2017 — Thailand
- Althepus erectus Li et al., 2014 — Laos
- Althepus flabellaris Li et al., 2014 — Thailand
- Althepus gouci Li et al., 2018 — Myanmar
- Althepus guan Li et al., 2018 — Sumatra
- Althepus hongguangi Li et al., 2018 — Sulawesi
- Althepus huoyan Li et al., 2017 — Thailand
- Althepus incognitus Brignoli, 1973 — India
- Althepus indistinctus Deeleman-Reinhold, 1995 — Borneo
- Althepus javanensis Deeleman-Reinhold, 1995 — Java
- Althepus jiandan Li et al., 2017 — Thailand
- Althepus kuan Li et al., 2017 — Thailand
- Althepus lakmueangensis Li et al., 2017 — Thailand
- Althepus languensis Li et al., 2017 — Thailand
- Althepus lehi Deeleman-Reinhold, 1985 — Borneo
- Althepus leucosternus Deeleman-Reinhold, 1995 — Thailand
- Althepus maechamensis Li et al., 2018 — Thailand
- Althepus menglaensis Li et al., 2018 — China
- Althepus minimus Deeleman-Reinhold, 1995 — Sumatra
- Althepus muangensis Li et al., 2017 — Thailand
- Althepus naphongensis Li et al., 2018 — Vietnam
- Althepus natmataungensis Li et al., 2018 — Myanmar
- Althepus noonadanae Brignoli, 1973 — Philippines
- Althepus nophaseudi Li et al., 2014 — Laos
- Althepus phadaengensis Li et al., 2018 — Thailand
- Althepus phousalao Li et al., 2018 — Laos
- Althepus pictus Thorell, 1898 — Myanmar
- Althepus pum Deeleman-Reinhold, 1995 — Thailand
- Althepus qianhuang Li et al., 2018 — Java
- Althepus qingyuani Li et al., 2018 — China
- Althepus qiqiu Li et al., 2017 — Thailand
- Althepus reduncus Li et al., 2014 — Myanmar
- Althepus sepakuensis Li et al., 2018 — Borneo
- Althepus shanhu Li et al., 2018 — Myanmar
- Althepus spiralis Li et al., 2014 — Malaysia
- Althepus stonei Deeleman-Reinhold, 1995 — Thailand
- Althepus suayaiensis Li et al., 2018 — Thailand
- Althepus suhartoi Deeleman-Reinhold, 1985 — Sumatra
- Althepus tadetuensis Li et al., 2018 — Laos
- Althepus tanhuang Li et al., 2018 — Thailand
- Althepus thanlaensis Li et al., 2018 — Thailand
- Althepus tharnlodensis Li et al., 2018 — Thailand
- Althepus tibiatus Deeleman-Reinhold, 1985 — Thailand
- Althepus tuqi Li et al., 2017 — Thailand
- Althepus viengkeoensis Li et al., 2018 — Laos
- Althepus xianxi Li et al., 2017 — Thailand
- Althepus xuae Li et al., 2018 — China
- Althepus yizhuang Li et al., 2018 — Sumatra
