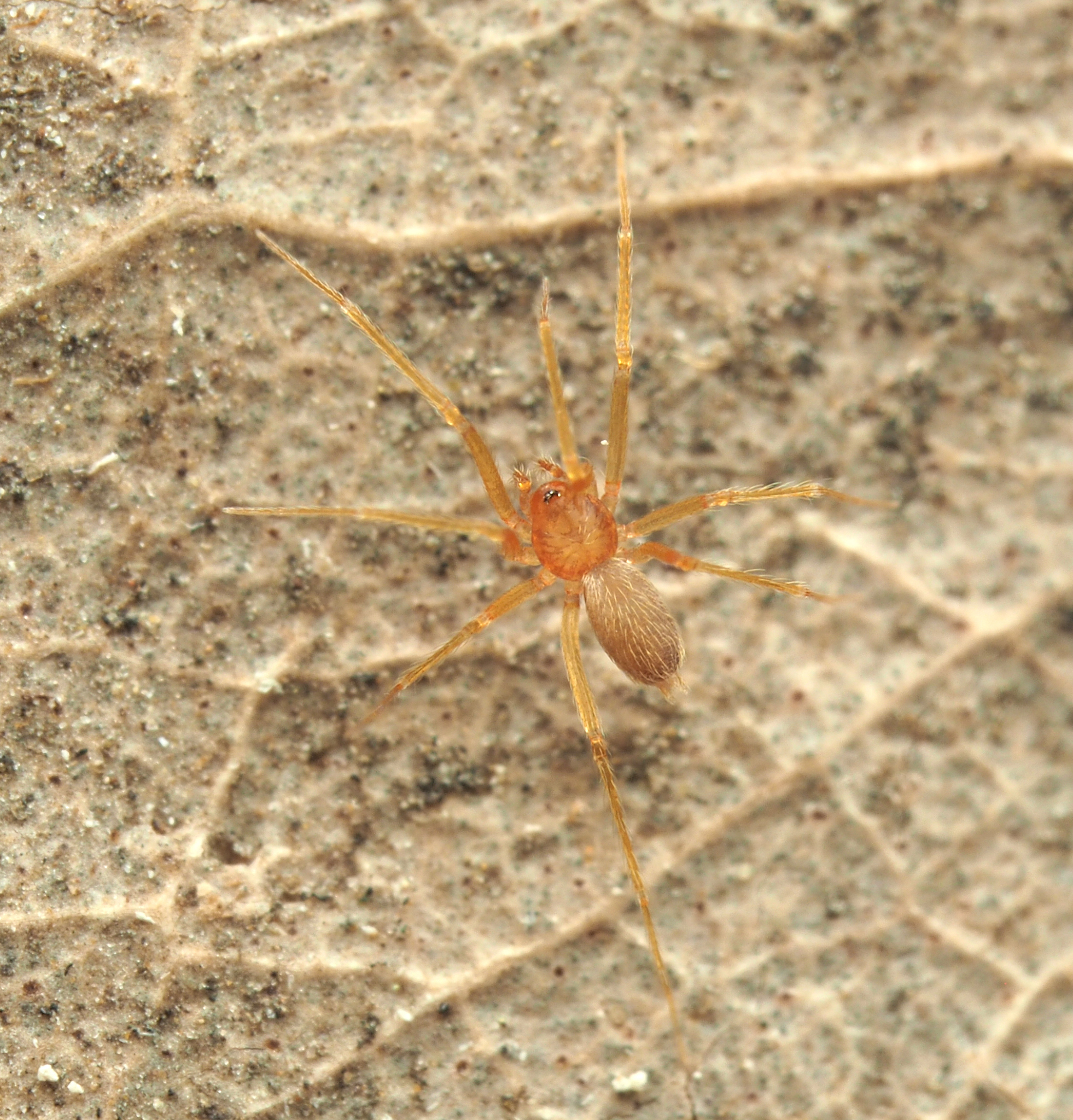
- Theotima minutissima in Australia

Scientific classification
- Kingdom: Animalia
- Phylum: Arthropoda
- Subphylum: Chelicerata
- Class: Arachnida
- Order: Araneae
- Infraorder: Araneomorphae
- Family: Ochyroceratidae; Fage, 1912

Diversity
- 9 genera, 184 species
- blue: reported countries (WSC)

= Ochyroceratidae =

Midget ground weavers Temporal range: Cretaceous–present

Family of spiders

Ochyroceratidae is a six-eyed spider family, with almost 200 described species in nine genera.

They are common inhabitants of caves and the tropical forest litter of South Africa, the Caribbean, Asia and South America. Considered an ecological counterpart of the Linyphiidae of the northern temperate zone, species are especially diverse in the Indo-Pacific region.

These spiders build small, irregular sheet-webs in dark, damp places and typically carry eggs in their chelicerae until they hatch. Body length can range from 0.6 to 3.0 millimetres (0.024 to 0.118 in), and some species with very long legs (Althepus, Leclercera) are superficially similar to members of Pholcidae. Differences between males and females are still relatively unknown, but at least one species in the genus Theotima (T. minutissima) was shown to be parthenogenetic.

== Genera ==
As of January 2026, this family includes nine genera and 184 species:

- Dundocera Machado, 1951 – Angola
- Euso Saaristo, 2001 – Seychelles
- Lundacera Machado, 1951 – Angola
- Ochyrocera Simon, 1892 – Cuba, Hispaniola, St. Vincent, Guatemala, Mexico, Samoa, South America, Lesser Antilles
- Ouette Saaristo, 1998 – Seychelles, China
- Psiloochyrocera Baert, 2014 – Ecuador
- Roche Saaristo, 1998 – Seychelles
- Speocera Berland, 1914 – Angola, Cameroon, Kenya, Madagascar, Seychelles, Asia, Cuba, New Guinea, Papua New Guinea, Niue, Samoa, Tokelau, Brazil, Ecuador, Galapagos, East Africa
- Theotima Simon, 1893 – Angola, Cameroon, Democratic Republic of the Congo, Cuba, Puerto Rico, St. Vincent, Panama, Hawaii, Mexico, Galapagos, Venezuela, Tropical Asia. Introduced to Seychelles, the Czech Republic, Germany, Hungary, Martinique, Puerto Rico, Panama, Guam
