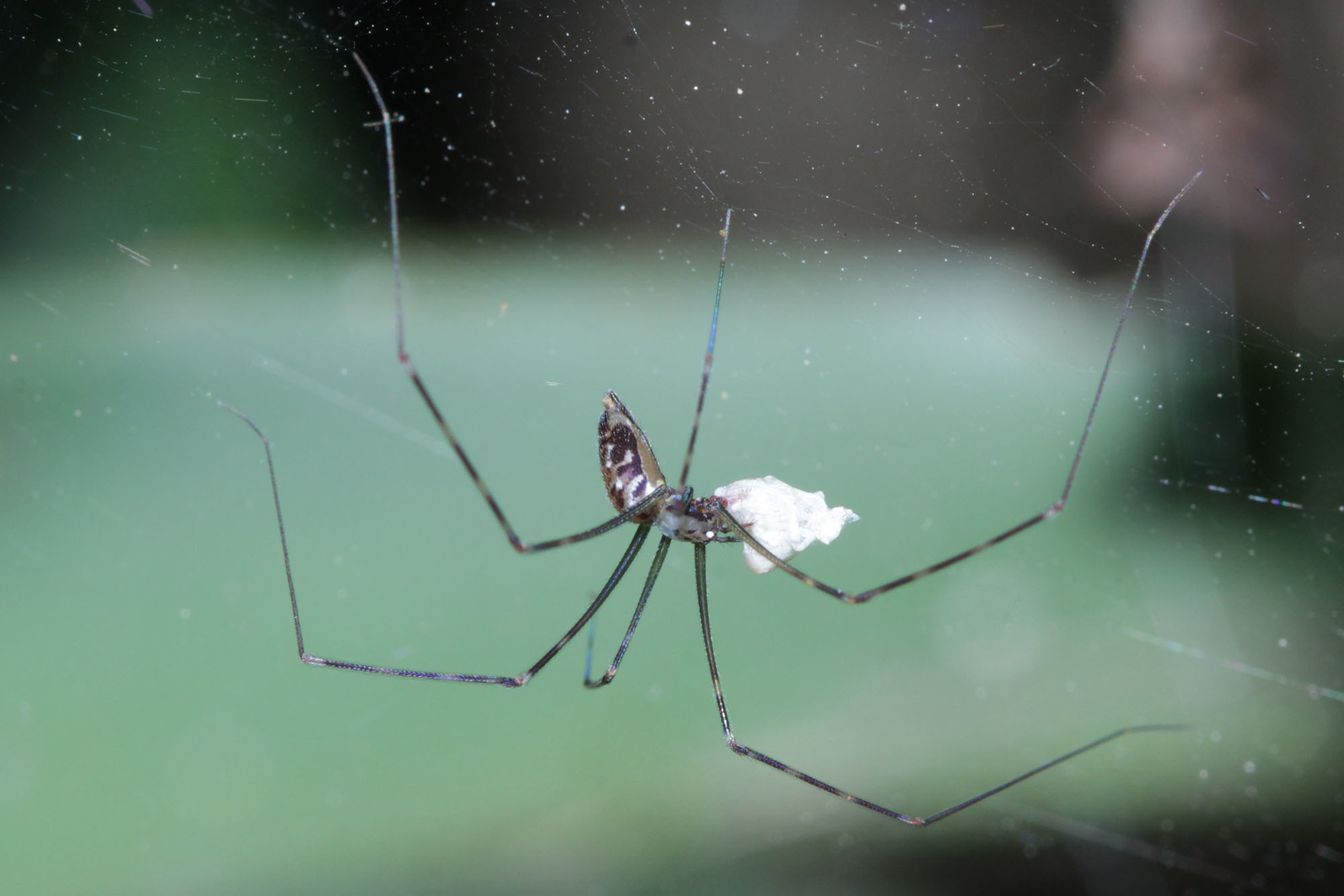
- Althepus sp. in Indonesia
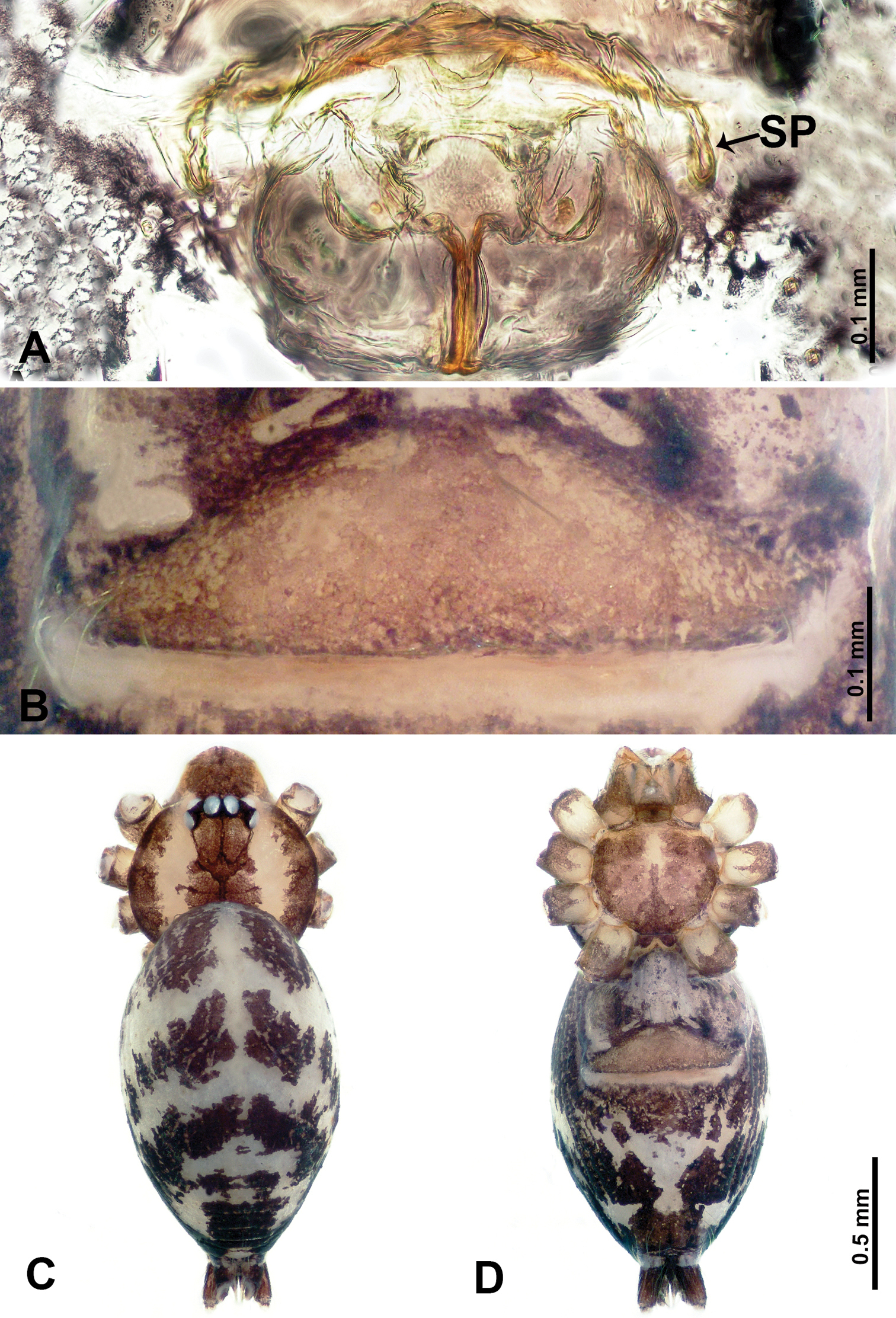
- Flexicrurum minutum

Scientific classification
- Kingdom: Animalia
- Phylum: Arthropoda
- Subphylum: Chelicerata
- Class: Arachnida
- Order: Araneae
- Infraorder: Araneomorphae
- Superfamily: Dysderoidea
- Family: Psilodercidae; Machado, 1951

Diversity
- 11 genera, 224 species
- blue: reported countries (WSC)

= Psilodercidae =

Family of spiders

Psilodercidae is a family of spiders first described as a subfamily of Ochyroceratidae by Machado in 1951 and raised to family rank by J. Wunderlich in 2008. These spiders can be distinguished by the "segestriid positioning" of their six eyes, the absence of leg bristles, strong apical bristles on the cymbium, and several pairs of spermathecae in females.

This family is relatively unstudied and may change as more information becomes available. In particular, Wunderlich remarked that Psiloderces is too broad and should be split into smaller, more distinct groups.

== Genera ==
As of January 2026, this family includes eleven genera and 224 species:

- Althepus Thorell, 1898 – Asia
- Flexicrurum Tong & Li, 2007 – China
- Leclercera Deeleman-Reinhold, 1995 – Asia
- Luzonacera F. Y. Li & S. Q. Li, 2017 – Philippines
- Merizocera Fage, 1912 – Asia
- Priscaleclercera Wunderlich, 2017
- Psiloderces Simon, 1892 – Asia
- Qiongocera F. Y. Li & S. Q. Li, 2017 – China
- Relictocera F. Y. Li & S. Q. Li, 2017 – Thailand, Vietnam
- Sinoderces F. Y. Li & S. Q. Li, 2017 – China, Laos, Thailand
- Thaiderces F. Y. Li & S. Q. Li, 2017 – Indonesia, Myanmar, Thailand
