= Conqueror =

A conqueror is a person who conquers.

Conqueror, The Conqueror or The Conquerors may also refer to:

== Military ==
- HMS Conqueror, various British Royal Navy ships
- Conqueror-class monitor, a Royal Navy ship class
- USS Conqueror (AMc-70), a US Navy coastal minesweeper
- Conqueror (tank), a British post-World War II heavy tank

== Arts and entertainment ==
=== Film and television ===
- The Conqueror (1917 film), a silent biographical western
- The Conquerors (1932 film), an American frontier saga/western
- The Conqueror (1956 film), a 1956 epic starring John Wayne as Genghis Khan
- The Conqueror, a 1990 episode of the cartoon Captain Planet and the Planeteers
- The Conquerors (TV series), a 2005 American series covering great leaders' lives
- The Conquerors (2013 film), a French adventure/road movie comedy

=== Literature ===
- The Conqueror (Heyer novel), a 1931 novel written by Georgette Heyer
- The Conqueror (Żuławski novel), a 1910 novel written by Jerzy Żuławski
- Conqueror (novel series), a series of novels by Conn Iggulden
  - Conqueror (Iggulden novel), the last book of the series, published in 2011
- Conqueror (Baxter novel), a 2007 science fiction novel by Stephen Baxter
- The Conquerors (play), a 1898 play by Paul M. Potter
- Conquerors trilogy, a science fiction trilogy by Timothy Zahn

=== Music ===
==== Albums ====
- Conqueror (Jesu album), 2007
- Conqueror (Gates of Slumber album), 2008
- Conqueror (Band-Maid album), 2019

==== Songs ====
- "Conqueror" (Estelle song), 2014
- "Conqueror" (Aurora song), 2016
- "The Conqueror", a 1912 arrangement by Louis-Philippe Laurendeau of the 1903 German march "Graf Zeppelin" by Carl Teike

==== Other ====
- Conqueror Records, an American record label

=== Pro wrestling ===
- Brock Lesnar (born 1977), called "The Conqueror"
- Sheamus (born 1978), called "The Celtic Conqueror"

=== Board games ===
- The Conquerors (board game), a 1977 board wargame set in Ancient history

=== Video games ===
- Conqueror (video game), a 1988 tank command video game
- Age of Empires II: The Conquerors, 1999 real-time strategy game

== Other uses ==
- List of people known as the Conqueror
- Conqueror (paper manufacturer), founded in the late 1880s by E.P. Barlow
- Curtiss V-1570 Conqueror, a 1926 aircraft engine

== See also ==
- Conqueror A.D. 1086, a 1995 medieval strategy computer game
- Konqueror, a KDE-based web browser and file manager
- Conkeror, a Mozilla-based web browers
- Conquistador (disambiguation)
- Conquest (disambiguation)
- Conquer (disambiguation)
