= Conquest (disambiguation) =

Conquest is the act of military subjugation of an enemy by force of arms.

Conquest may also refer to:

== History ==
- Early Muslim conquests
- Norman conquest of England, often referred to simply as "the Conquest"
- The Age of Conquistadors

== Stage, film and television ==
- Conquest, a 1933 Broadway play starring Harvey Stephens
- Conquest (1928 film), an American aviation drama film
- Conquest (1937 film), a film starring Greta Garbo and Charles Boyer
- Conquest (1983 film), a sword & sorcery fantasy film directed by Lucio Fulci
- Conquest (1998 film), a British-Canadian film
- Conquest (TV series), a History Channel series
- Conquest, a 1950s CBS news program hosted by Eric Sevareid
- Conquest, an abandoned Netflix television drama created by Carl Rinsch

== Music ==
- Conquest (Uriah Heep album), a 1980 album by rock band Uriah Heep
- Conquest (Dragon Fli Empire album), a 2004 hip hop album
- Conquest, a 1985 album by Brass Construction
- "Conquest" (song), a 1952 Corky Robbins song covered in 2007 by The White Stripes

== Gaming ==
- Conquest of the New World, a turn-based strategy game made by Quicksilver Software in 1996
- Conquest (board game), a strategy board game by Donald Benge
- Duell (game), a chess variant, called Conquest in the UK
- Conquest: Frontier Wars, a 2001 real-time strategy computer game for the PC by Ubi Soft
- Civilization III: Conquests, a 2003 expansion for computer game Civilization III
- The Lord of the Rings: Conquest, a 2009 action game
- Conquest (play-by-mail game)
- Conquest (1982 video game)

== People ==
- Bryan Conquest (1930–2018), Australian politician
- John Tricker Conquest (1789–1866), British midwife and physician
- Norman Conquest (soccer) (1916–1968), Australian footballer
- Robert Conquest (1917–2015), British historian
- Stuart Conquest (born 1967), British chess grandmaster

== Places ==
- Conquest, Saskatchewan, a Canadian village
- Conquest, New York, New York, an American town
- Houghton Conquest, a village in the United Kingdom

== Transportation ==
- Chrysler Conquest, a rebadged Mitsubishi Starion sports car
- Conquest Airlines, a defunct commuter airline
- Carnival Conquest, a 2002 cruise ship
- Conquest class, a class of cruise ship operated by Carnival Cruise Line
- Cessna 425 "Conquest", a twin engine aircraft produced by Cessna Aircraft Company
- Cessna 441 Conquest II, a twin engine aircraft produced by Cessna Aircraft Company

== Other uses ==
- Conquest, one of the Four Horsemen of the Apocalypse in some interpretations of the book of Revelation
- CONQUEST, a linear scaling, or O(N), density functional theory electronic structure code
- ConQuesT, a science fiction convention in Kansas City, Missouri
- Conquest (character), an Image Comics character
- Edge of Victory: Conquest, a novel by Greg Keyes
- Conquest X-30, a toy from the G.I. Joe: A Real American Hero toyline
- Conquest Racing, an American auto racing team
- Conquest Boys' clubs associated with ECyD
- CONQuest Festival, a pop culture and gaming convention in the Philippines

== See also ==
- Right of conquest, a former principle of international law
- Conquistador (disambiguation)
- Conqueror (disambiguation)
- Conquer (disambiguation)
- The Conquest (disambiguation)
