= Conquistador (disambiguation) =

Conquistador is a term used for explorers and conquerors from Iberia during the Age of Discovery.

Conquistador or variation, may also refer to:

== People ==
- List of conquistadors, people who were conquistadors
  - Juan de Oñate (1550–1626), known as "The Last Conquistador"
- El Conquistador (band), a U.S. ska music band
- Los Conquistadores, a professional wrestling tag team, composed of a rotating cast of pro-wrestlers known as Conquistador Uno (Conquistador #1) and Conquistador Dos (Conquistador #2)
  - Conquistador I, a ring name of José Estrada Sr., a Puerto Rican professional wrestler

== Sport ==
- Conquistador Cielo (1979–2002), a racehorse bred in Florida
- Dodge City Community College, a public community college located in Dodge City, Kansas
- Florida National University, a university in Hialeah, Florida
- Pasco–Hernando State College, a college in New Port Richey, Florida
- San Diego Conquistadors, a basketball team in the American Basketball Association in the 1970s

== Arts, entertainment, and media ==
- La Conquistadora (statue; Our Lady of the Conquest), a small wooden statue of the Madonna and Child in the Cathedral Basilica of St. Francis of Assisi in Santa Fe, New Mexico, USA
- Conquistador (game), a board game simulating the exploration of the New World in the 16th century
- Expeditions: Conquistador, an RPG videogame
- Conquistadors (TV series), a BBC documentary series on the Spanish expeditions of conquest of the Americas
- Conquistadores: Adventvm, a 2017 Spanish historical drama TV miniseries

=== Literature ===
- El Conquistador. a weekly newspaper from Illinois, USA
- Conquistador (novel), an alternate history novel by S. M. Stirling
- Conquistadores, a volume of the manga Bleach
- "Conquistador'", a poem written by Australian poet A. D. Hope
- "Conquistadors", a 2019 poem by UK Poet Laureate Simon Armitage to commemorate the 1969 Moon landing
- La Conquistadora, the Autobiography of an Ancient Statue (book), a 1975 historical dramatization by Angelico Chavez
- Conquistadora, a 2011 novel by Esmeralda Santiago

=== Music ===
==== Albums ====
- Conquistador! (Cecil Taylor album), a 1966 jazz album by Cecil Taylor
- Conquistador (Maynard Ferguson album), a 1977 album by Canadian jazz trumpeter Maynard Ferguson
- El Conquistadors (album), a 2009 album by dreDDup
- Conquistador (Dylan Carlson album), a 2018 album by Dylan Carlson
- Conquistadora (EP), a 2016 extended play album by Chantal Claret

==== Songs ====
- "Conquistador" (Da Vinci song), a song performed by Da Vinci at the 1989 Eurovision Song Contest
- "Conquistador" (Procol Harum song), a 1967 song written by Gary Brooker and Keith Reid for Procol Harum
- "Conquistador" (Thirty Seconds to Mars song), a 2013 song recorded by Thirty Seconds to Mars
- "Conquistador", a song by Saxon from their 1999 album Metalhead
- "Conquistadores", a song by Running Wild from their 1988 album Port Royal
- "Conquistadora", a song by Paul Rodgers from his 1999 album Electric (Paul Rodgers album)

== Other uses ==
- Conquistador Council, a Boy Scouts of America local council in New Mexico
- La Conquistadora, Salcajá, Quetzaltenango, Guatemala; the first church built in Central America

== See also ==
- Euzophera conquistador (E. conquistador), a species of moth
- La Ruta de los Conquistadores, a mountain bike race in Costa Rica
- The Last Conquistador, a 2008 documentary telefilm about Juan de Oñate
- Conqueror (disambiguation)
- Conquest (disambiguation)
- Conquer (disambiguation)
