= Euzophera aglaeella =

Scientific classification
- Kingdom: Animalia
- Phylum: Arthropoda
- Clade: Pancrustacea
- Class: Insecta
- Order: Lepidoptera
- Family: Pyralidae
- Genus: Euzophera
- Species: E. aglaeella

Binomial name
- Euzophera aglaeella Ragonot, 1887

Species of moth

Euzophera aglaeella is a species of snout moth in the genus Euzophera. It was described by Ragonot in 1887, and is known from Arizona.

== Taxonomy ==
The species was formerly treated as a synonym of Euzophera semifuneralis.
