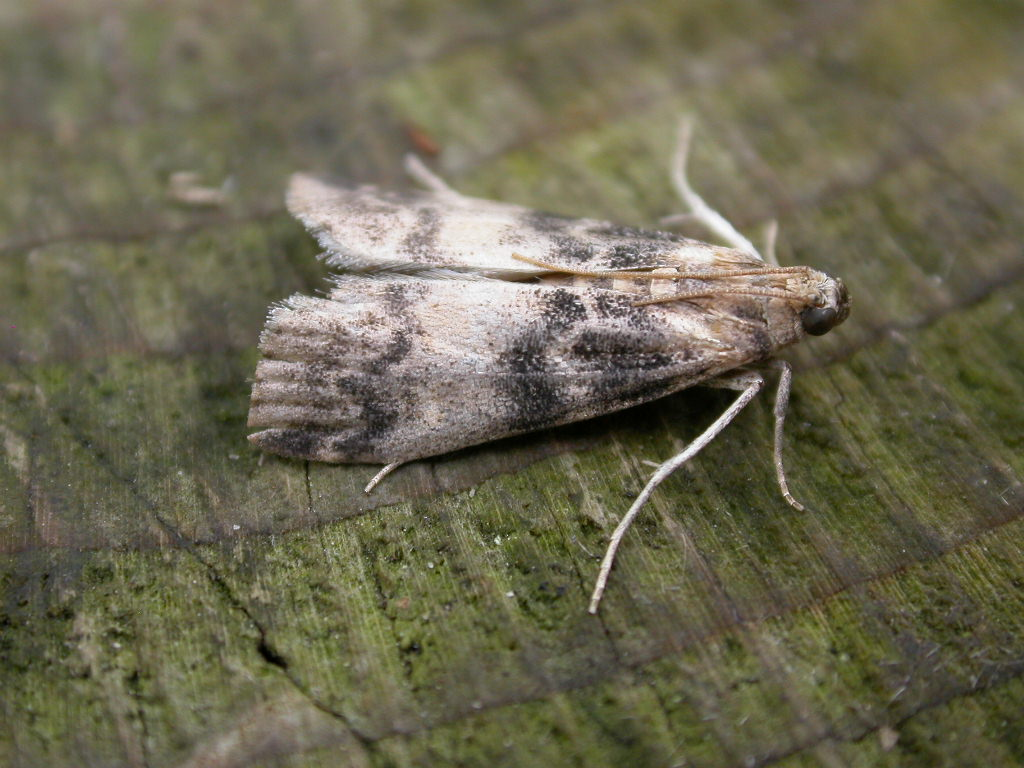

Scientific classification
- Kingdom: Animalia
- Phylum: Arthropoda
- Clade: Pancrustacea
- Class: Insecta
- Order: Lepidoptera
- Family: Pyralidae
- Genus: Euzophera
- Species: E. pinguis

Binomial name
- Euzophera pinguis (Haworth, 1811)

Synonyms
- Phycis pinguis Haworth, 1811; Euzophera pinguis concolorella Ragonot in Staudinger, 1892; Euzophera nelliella Ragonot, 1894; Nephopteryx fischeri Zeller, 1846; Nephopteryx splendidella Herrich-Schäffer, 1848

= Euzophera pinguis =

Species of moth

Euzophera pinguis, the tabby knot-horn, is a moth of the family Pyralidae. It was described by Adrian Hardy Haworth in 1811 and is found in Europe.

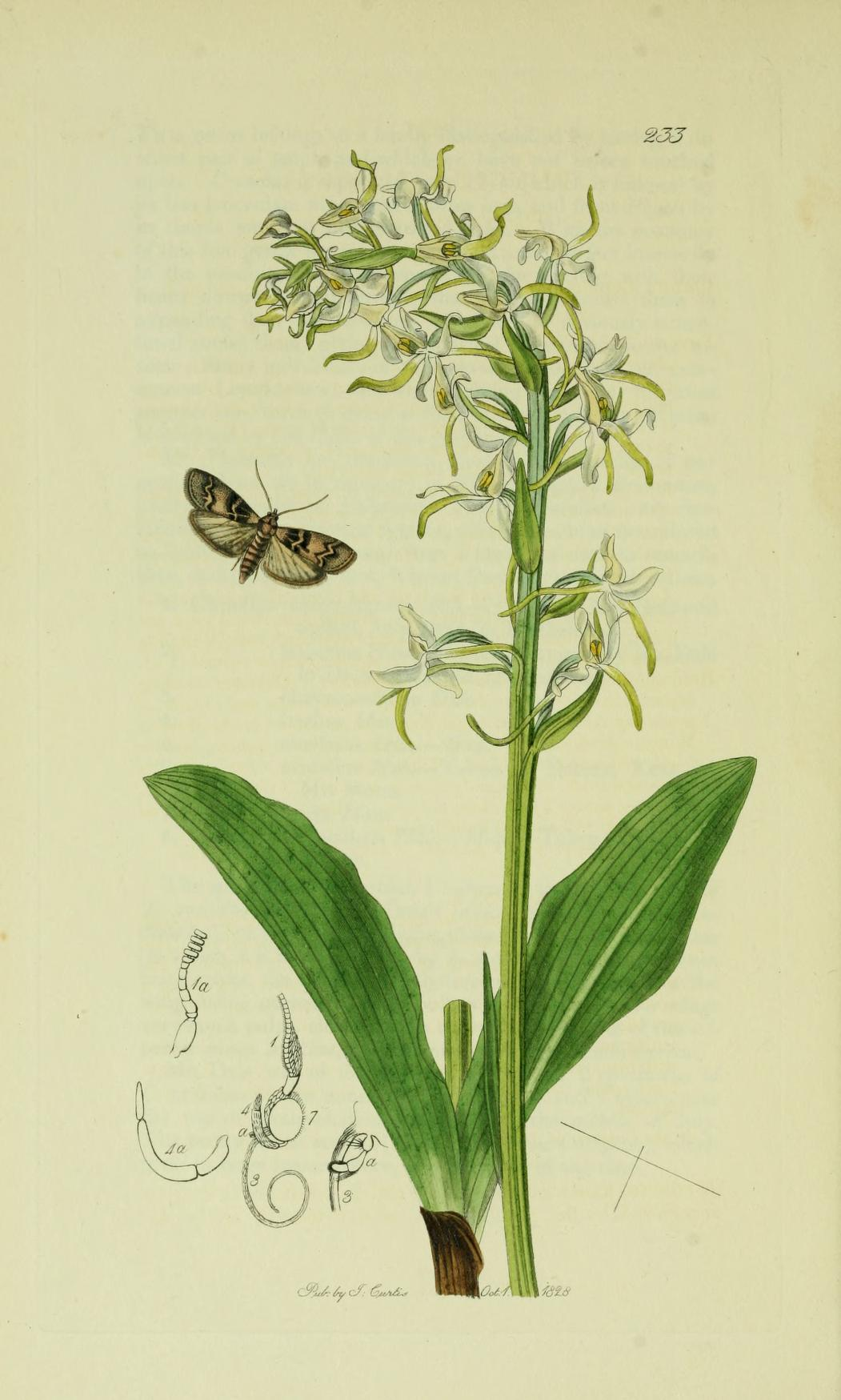
Illustration from John Curtis's British Entomology Volume 6

The wingspan is 23–28 mm. The forewings are light brownish-ochreous, somewhat reddish-tinged, pale sprinkled, with a few blackish scales; lines hardly paler, first rather curved, edged anteriorly by a broad blackish band, posteriorly by a thick blackish suffusion, second angulated in middle, strongly edged with dark fuscous; terminal area more infuscated. Hindwings light fuscous. The larva is pinkish ochreous; dorsal line darker, interrupted; a lateral spot on 3 and 12 ringed with reddish-brown; head and plate of 2 reddish-brown, blackish-marked: in bark of ash; 9–6, perhaps sometimes living two years.

The moths are on wing from July to August depending on the location.

The larvae feed on Fraxinus excelsior.
