= Euzophera batangensis =

Scientific classification
- Kingdom: Animalia
- Phylum: Arthropoda
- Clade: Pancrustacea
- Class: Insecta
- Order: Lepidoptera
- Family: Pyralidae
- Genus: Euzophera
- Species: E. batangensis

Binomial name
- Euzophera batangensis Caradja, 1939

Species of moth

Euzophera batangensis is a species of snout moth in the genus Euzophera. It was described by Aristide Caradja in 1939 and is known from Batang, Sichuan, China, from which its species epithet is derived.
