= Euzophera cornutella =

Scientific classification
- Kingdom: Animalia
- Phylum: Arthropoda
- Clade: Pancrustacea
- Class: Insecta
- Order: Lepidoptera
- Family: Pyralidae
- Genus: Euzophera
- Species: E. cornutella

Binomial name
- Euzophera cornutella (Roesler, 1965)

Synonyms
- Longignathia cornutella Roesler, 1965

Species of moth

Euzophera cornutella is a species of snout moth in the genus Euzophera. It was described by Roesler in 1965, and is known from China.
