= Euzophera flagella =

Scientific classification
- Kingdom: Animalia
- Phylum: Arthropoda
- Clade: Pancrustacea
- Class: Insecta
- Order: Lepidoptera
- Family: Pyralidae
- Genus: Euzophera
- Species: E. flagella

Binomial name
- Euzophera flagella (Lederer, 1869)

Synonyms
- Myelois flagella Lederer, 1869

Species of moth

Euzophera flagella is a species of snout moth in the genus Euzophera. It was described by Julius Lederer in 1869 and is known from Iran and Turkey.
