= Euzophera vinnulella =

Scientific classification
- Kingdom: Animalia
- Phylum: Arthropoda
- Clade: Pancrustacea
- Class: Insecta
- Order: Lepidoptera
- Family: Pyralidae
- Genus: Euzophera
- Species: E. vinnulella

Binomial name
- Euzophera vinnulella Neunzig, 1990

Species of moth

Euzophera vinnulella is a species of snout moth in the genus Euzophera. It was described by Herbert H. Neunzig in 1990 and is known from the US state of California.
