= Euzophera fibigerella =

Scientific classification
- Kingdom: Animalia
- Phylum: Arthropoda
- Clade: Pancrustacea
- Class: Insecta
- Order: Lepidoptera
- Family: Pyralidae
- Genus: Euzophera
- Species: E. fibigerella

Binomial name
- Euzophera fibigerella Asselbergs, 1997

Species of moth

Euzophera fibigerella is a species of snout moth in the genus Euzophera. It was described by Jan Asselbergs in 1997 and is known from Turkey.
