= Euzophera afflictella =

Scientific classification
- Kingdom: Animalia
- Phylum: Arthropoda
- Clade: Pancrustacea
- Class: Insecta
- Order: Lepidoptera
- Family: Pyralidae
- Genus: Euzophera
- Species: E. afflictella

Binomial name
- Euzophera afflictella Ragonot, 1887

Species of moth

Euzophera afflictella is a species of snout moth in the genus Euzophera. It was described by Ragonot in 1887, and is known from Amur in the Russian Far East.
