= Euzophera subnitidella =

Scientific classification
- Kingdom: Animalia
- Phylum: Arthropoda
- Clade: Pancrustacea
- Class: Insecta
- Order: Lepidoptera
- Family: Pyralidae
- Genus: Euzophera
- Species: E. subnitidella

Binomial name
- Euzophera subnitidella Ragonot, 1887

Synonyms
- Euzophera subnitidella var. striatella Ragonot, 1887

Species of moth

Euzophera subnitidella is a species of snout moth in the genus Euzophera. It was described by Émile Louis Ragonot in 1887, and is known from Russia (Marghilan and Altai).
