= Euzophera rubricetella =

Scientific classification
- Kingdom: Animalia
- Phylum: Arthropoda
- Clade: Pancrustacea
- Class: Insecta
- Order: Lepidoptera
- Family: Pyralidae
- Genus: Euzophera
- Species: E. rubricetella

Binomial name
- Euzophera rubricetella (Herrich-Schäffer, 1856)

Synonyms
- Epischnia rubricetella Herrich-Schäffer, 1856

Species of moth

Euzophera rubricetella is a species of snout moth in the genus Euzophera. It was described by Gottlieb August Wilhelm Herrich-Schäffer in 1856. It is found in Russia and Turkey.
