= Euzophera paghmanicola =

Scientific classification
- Kingdom: Animalia
- Phylum: Arthropoda
- Clade: Pancrustacea
- Class: Insecta
- Order: Lepidoptera
- Family: Pyralidae
- Genus: Euzophera
- Species: E. paghmanicola

Binomial name
- Euzophera paghmanicola Roesler, 1973

Species of moth

Euzophera paghmanicola is a species of snout moth, family Pyralidae. It was described by Rolf-Ulrich Roesler in 1973. It is known from Afghanistan and Cyprus.
