= Euzophera osseatella =

Scientific classification
- Kingdom: Animalia
- Phylum: Arthropoda
- Clade: Pancrustacea
- Class: Insecta
- Order: Lepidoptera
- Family: Pyralidae
- Genus: Euzophera
- Species: E. osseatella

Binomial name
- Euzophera osseatella (Treitschke, 1832)

Synonyms
- Phycis osseatella Treitschke, 1832

Species of moth

Euzophera osseatella, the eggplant borer, is a species of snout moth in the genus Euzophera. It was described by Georg Friedrich Treitschke in 1832. It is found in Great Britain, France, Spain, Portugal, Italy, Sicily, Sardinia, Corsica, Croatia, Greece, Cyprus, Syria, Israel and North Africa.

The wingspan is 22–30 mm.

The larvae feed on potato, eggplant tomato and pepper. Young larvae bore into the stem, down toward the root.
