= Euzophera costivittella =

Scientific classification
- Kingdom: Animalia
- Phylum: Arthropoda
- Clade: Pancrustacea
- Class: Insecta
- Order: Lepidoptera
- Family: Pyralidae
- Genus: Euzophera
- Species: E. costivittella

Binomial name
- Euzophera costivittella Ragonot, 1887

Species of moth

Euzophera costivittella is a species of snout moth in the genus Euzophera. It was described by Ragonot in 1887. It is found in Russia.
