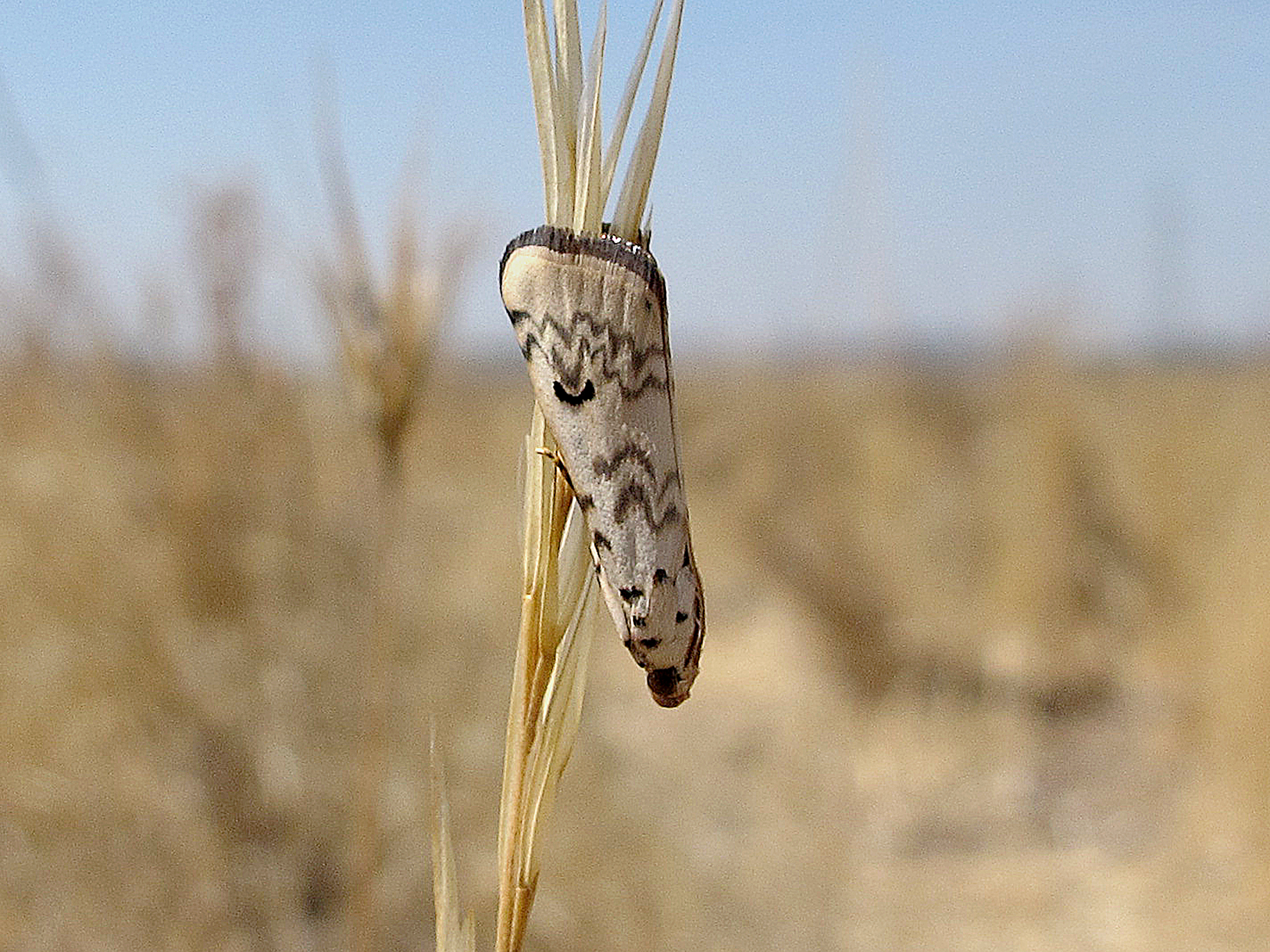

Scientific classification
- Kingdom: Animalia
- Phylum: Arthropoda
- Clade: Pancrustacea
- Class: Insecta
- Order: Lepidoptera
- Family: Pyralidae
- Genus: Euzophera
- Species: E. lunulella

Binomial name
- Euzophera lunulella (Costa, 1836)

Synonyms
- Tinea lunulella Costa, 1836; Myelois corcyrella Herrich-Schäffer, 1849

= Euzophera lunulella =

Species of moth

Euzophera lunulella is a species of snout moth in the genus Euzophera. It was described by O.-G. Costa in 1836. It is found in Spain, France, Italy, Albania, North Macedonia, Greece and on Crete.

The wingspan is about 24 mm.
