= Euzophera perticella =

Scientific classification
- Kingdom: Animalia
- Phylum: Arthropoda
- Clade: Pancrustacea
- Class: Insecta
- Order: Lepidoptera
- Family: Pyralidae
- Genus: Euzophera
- Species: E. perticella

Binomial name
- Euzophera perticella Ragonot, 1888

Synonyms
- Euzophera nilghirisella Ragonot, 1901

Species of moth

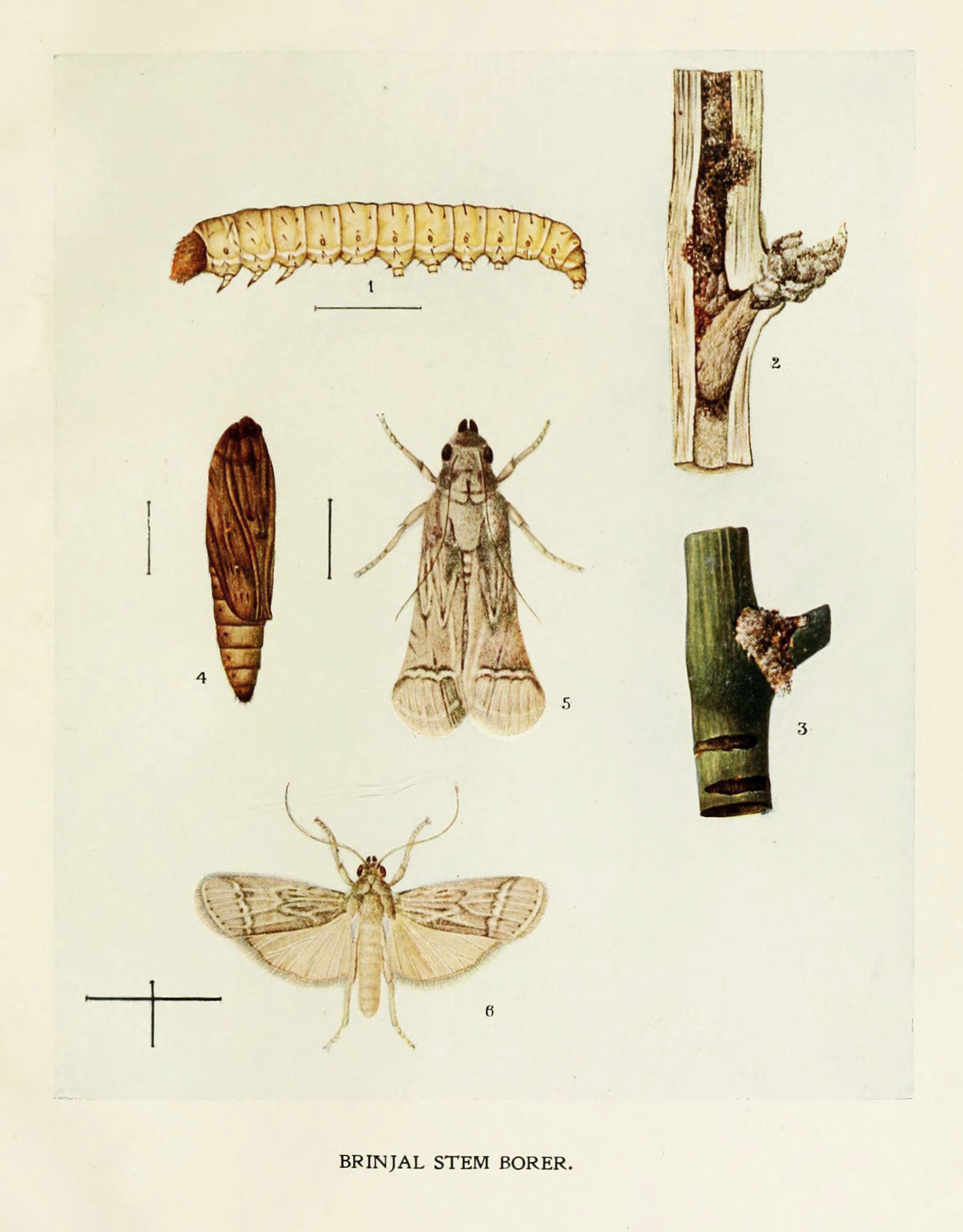
Euzophera perticella

Euzophera perticella is a species of snout moth in the genus Euzophera.

Their larvae are a pest on Solanum melongena (Solanaceae).

== Distribution ==
This species is known from India and Sri Lanka.
