= Euzophera ultimella =

Scientific classification
- Kingdom: Animalia
- Phylum: Arthropoda
- Clade: Pancrustacea
- Class: Insecta
- Order: Lepidoptera
- Family: Pyralidae
- Genus: Euzophera
- Species: E. ultimella

Binomial name
- Euzophera ultimella Roesler, 1973

Synonyms
- Quadrempista ultimella

Species of moth

Euzophera ultimella is a species of snout moth in the genus Euzophera. It was described by Roesler in 1973, and was discovered in Afghanistan. It has also been found in Kyrgyzstan.
