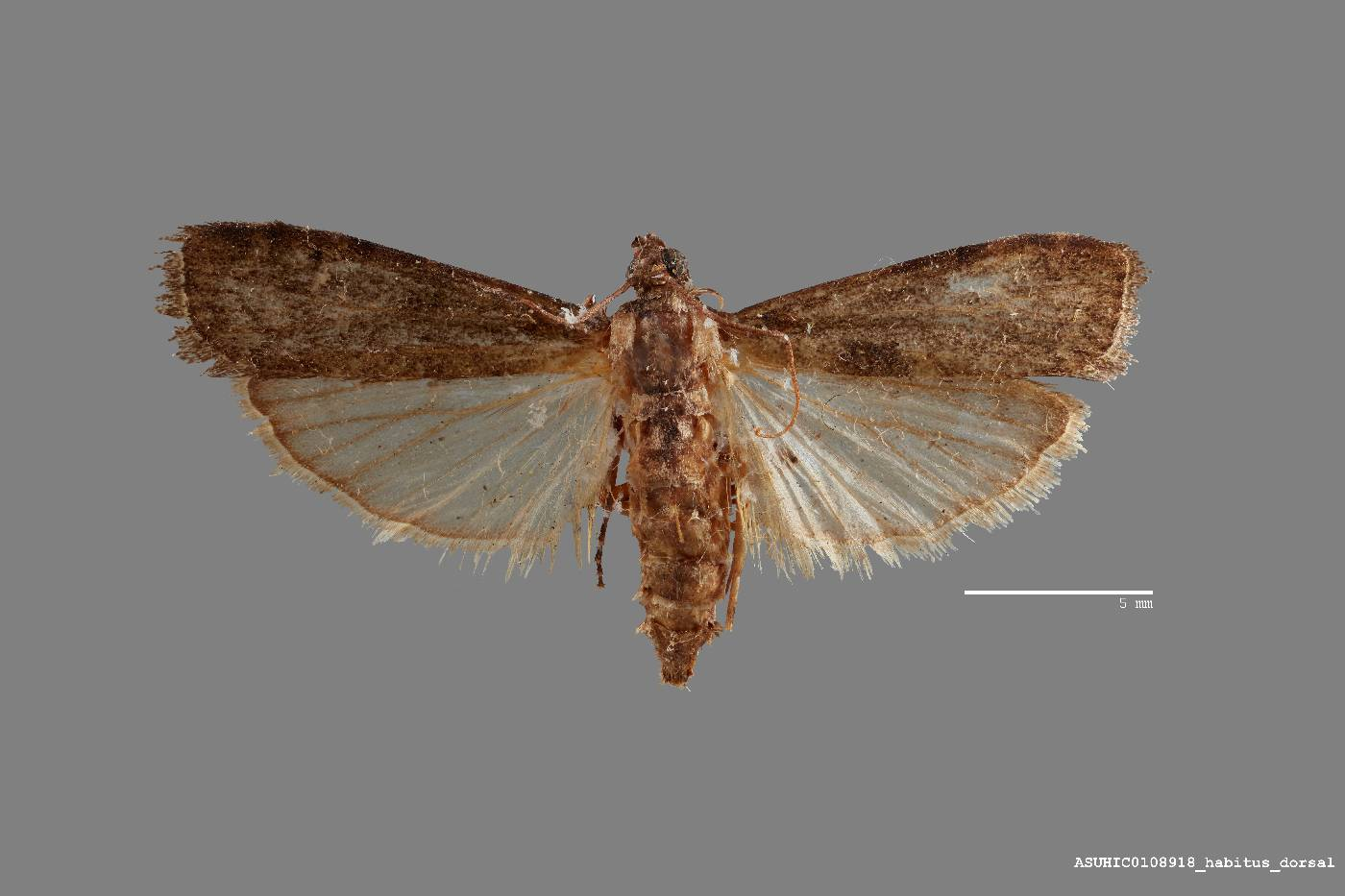

Scientific classification
- Kingdom: Animalia
- Phylum: Arthropoda
- Clade: Pancrustacea
- Class: Insecta
- Order: Lepidoptera
- Family: Pyralidae
- Genus: Euzophera
- Species: E. nigricantella

Binomial name
- Euzophera nigricantella Ragonot, 1887

Synonyms
- Euzophera griselda Dyar, 1913

= Euzophera nigricantella =

Species of moth

Euzophera nigricantella is a species of snout moth in the genus Euzophera. It was described by Émile Louis Ragonot in 1887. It is found in North America in Louisiana, Texas, New Mexico, Arizona and Mexico.
