= Euzophera bigella =

Scientific classification
- Kingdom: Animalia
- Phylum: Arthropoda
- Clade: Pancrustacea
- Class: Insecta
- Order: Lepidoptera
- Family: Pyralidae
- Genus: Euzophera
- Species: E. bigella

Binomial name
- Euzophera bigella (Zeller, 1848)

Synonyms
- Ephestia bigella Zeller, 1848; Ephestia egeriella Millière, 1873; Euzophera bisinuella Ragonot, 1887; Euzophera immundella Ragonot, 1901; Euzophera renulella Costantini, 1922; Euzopherodes angulella Chrétien in Oberthür, 1922; Homoeosoma stenoptycha Herrich-Schäffer, 1849; Nephopteryx punicaeella Moore, 1891

Species of moth

Euzophera bigella, the quince moth, is a species of snout moth in the genus Euzophera. It was described by Zeller in 1848. It is found in most of Europe (except Ireland, the Netherlands, Fennoscandia and the Baltic region), Iran, Baluchistan and Morocco.

The wingspan is 15–20 mm.
