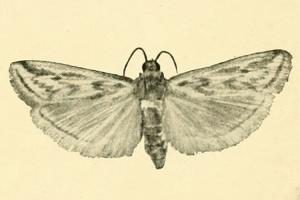

Scientific classification
- Kingdom: Animalia
- Phylum: Arthropoda
- Clade: Pancrustacea
- Class: Insecta
- Order: Lepidoptera
- Family: Pyralidae
- Genus: Euzophera
- Species: E. tetragramma

Binomial name
- Euzophera tetragramma (Rebel, 1910)

Synonyms
- Myelois tetragramma Rebel, 1910

= Euzophera tetragramma =

Species of moth

Euzophera tetragramma is a species of snout moth in the genus Euzophera. It was described by Rebel in 1910. It is found in Russia.
