= Euzophera tintilla =

Scientific classification
- Kingdom: Animalia
- Phylum: Arthropoda
- Clade: Pancrustacea
- Class: Insecta
- Order: Lepidoptera
- Family: Pyralidae
- Genus: Euzophera
- Species: E. tintilla

Binomial name
- Euzophera tintilla Dyar, 1914

Species of moth

Euzophera tintilla is a species of snout moth in the genus Euzophera. It was described by Harrison Gray Dyar Jr. in 1914, and is known from Panama.
