= Euzophera hulli =

Scientific classification
- Kingdom: Animalia
- Phylum: Arthropoda
- Clade: Pancrustacea
- Class: Insecta
- Order: Lepidoptera
- Family: Pyralidae
- Genus: Euzophera
- Species: E. hulli

Binomial name
- Euzophera hulli Asselbergs, 2009

Species of moth

Euzophera hulli is a species of snout moth in the genus Euzophera. It was described by Jan Asselbergs in 2009 and is known from Turkey.
