= Euzophera hemileuca =

Scientific classification
- Kingdom: Animalia
- Phylum: Arthropoda
- Clade: Pancrustacea
- Class: Insecta
- Order: Lepidoptera
- Family: Pyralidae
- Genus: Euzophera
- Species: E. hemileuca

Binomial name
- Euzophera hemileuca de Joannis, 1927

Species of snout moth

Euzophera hemileuca is a species of snout moth in the genus Euzophera. It was described by Joseph de Joannis in 1927 and is known from Mozambique.
