= Euzophera habrella =

Scientific classification
- Kingdom: Animalia
- Phylum: Arthropoda
- Clade: Pancrustacea
- Class: Insecta
- Order: Lepidoptera
- Family: Pyralidae
- Genus: Euzophera
- Species: E. habrella

Binomial name
- Euzophera habrella Neunzig, 1990

Species of moth

Euzophera habrella is a species of snout moth in the genus Euzophera. It was described by Herbert H. Neunzig in 1990 and is known from North America, including British Columbia, Quebec, Ontario, Maryland, Tennessee, Virginia and West Virginia.
