= Euzophera speculum =

Scientific classification
- Kingdom: Animalia
- Phylum: Arthropoda
- Class: Insecta
- Order: Lepidoptera
- Family: Pyralidae
- Genus: Euzophera
- Species: E. speculum

Binomial name
- Euzophera speculum de Joannis, 1927

Synonyms
- Euzophera specula

Species of moth

Euzophera speculum is a species of snout moth in the genus Euzophera. It was described by Joseph de Joannis in 1927 and is known from Mozambique.
