= Euzophera nessebarella =

Scientific classification
- Kingdom: Animalia
- Phylum: Arthropoda
- Clade: Pancrustacea
- Class: Insecta
- Order: Lepidoptera
- Family: Pyralidae
- Genus: Euzophera
- Species: E. nessebarella

Binomial name
- Euzophera nessebarella Soffner, 1962

Species of moth

Euzophera nessebarella is a species of snout moth in the genus Euzophera. It was described by Soffner in 1962. It is found in Bulgaria and Greece.
