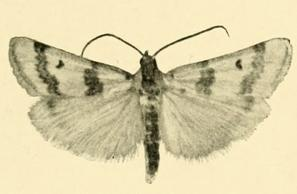

Scientific classification
- Kingdom: Animalia
- Phylum: Arthropoda
- Clade: Pancrustacea
- Class: Insecta
- Order: Lepidoptera
- Family: Pyralidae
- Genus: Euzophera
- Species: E. formosella

Binomial name
- Euzophera formosella (Rebel, 1910)

Synonyms
- Myelois formosella Rebel, 1910

= Euzophera formosella =

Species of moth

Euzophera formosella is a species of snout moth in the genus Euzophera. It was described by Rebel in 1910. It is found in Greece and Russia.
