= Euzophera villora =

Scientific classification
- Kingdom: Animalia
- Phylum: Arthropoda
- Clade: Pancrustacea
- Class: Insecta
- Order: Lepidoptera
- Family: Pyralidae
- Genus: Euzophera
- Species: E. villora

Binomial name
- Euzophera villora (C. Felder, R. Felder & Rogenhofer, 1875)

Synonyms
- Myelois villora C. Felder, R. Felder & Rogenhofer, 1875; Mussidia decaryalis Viette, 1953; Euzophera sharmotana Rougeot, 1977

Species of moth

Euzophera villora is a species of snout moth in the genus Euzophera. It was described by Cajetan Felder, Rudolf Felder and Alois Friedrich Rogenhofer in 1875 and has been observed in South Africa, Madagascar, Ethiopia and Ghana.

== Behavior ==
Euzophera villora is a stemborer of eggplants, attacking the main stem and leaving their eggs in leaf axils or petioles.
