= Dale Dye =

American actor, presenter and businessman

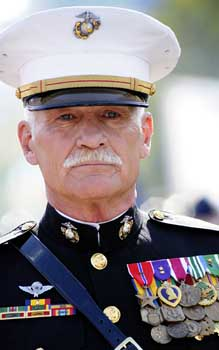
- Dye in 2008
- Born: Dale Adam Dye Jr. October 8, 1944 (age 82); Cape Girardeau, Missouri, U.S.
- Education: University of Maryland University College (BA)
- Occupations: Actor; technical advisor; radio host; writer
- Years active: 1986–present
- Awards: Order of Saint Maurice
- Military career
- Allegiance: United States of America
- Branch: United States Marine Corps
- Service years: 1964–84
- Rank: Captain
- Units: 1st Battalion, 5th Marines; 2nd Battalion, 5th Marines; 2nd Battalion, 1st Marines
- Conflicts: Vietnam War; Tet Offensive; Lebanese Civil War
- Awards: Bronze Star Medal; Purple Heart (3)
- Website: daledye.com

Dale Adam Dye Jr. (born October 8, 1944) is an American actor, technical advisor, radio host and writer. A decorated Marine Corps veteran of the Vietnam War, Dye is the founder and head of Warriors, Inc., a technical advisory company specializing in portraying realistic military action in Hollywood films. Dye has also offered his expertise to television, such as the HBO miniseries Band of Brothers and The Pacific, the Apple TV+ miniseries Masters of the Air, and video games, including the Medal of Honor series.

== Early life ==
Dye was born on October 8, 1944, in Cape Girardeau, Missouri, to Dale Adam and Della Grace (née Koehler) Dye. Dye's father was a liquor salesman in the St. Louis area, and Dale accompanied him to working-class taverns where he heard stories from World War II veterans. One story from a Marine about man-to-man fighting in the Pacific Theater piqued Dye's attention, and after reading about the Battle of Iwo Jima, he resolved one day to join the United States Marine Corps. After graduating from the Missouri Military Academy, Dye failed the extrance exam for the United States Naval Academy three times, and enlisted in the United States Marine Corps in January 1964.

== Military career ==
After training for six months as a mortarman on Okinawa, Dye's unit was among the first to deploy to Vietnam at the end of 1965. After returning to the United States, his superiors noticed his keen observational skills and literary interest, and he was reclassified as one of the few Marine combat correspondents. Dye was wounded during the Tet Offensive in 1968; in his book Dispatches, journalist Michael Herr provides a vivid picture of Dye during the chaos of the Tet Offensive and the Battle of Huế:

And there was a Marine correspondent, Sergeant Dale Dye, who sat with a tall yellow flower sticking out of his helmet cover, a really outstanding target. He was rolling his eyes around and saying, 'Oh yes, oh yes, Charlie's got his shit together here, this will be bad," and smiling happily. It was the same smile I saw a week later when a sniper's bullet tore up a wall two inches above his head, odd cause for amusement in anyone but a grunt.

Fellow Marine correspondent Gustav Hasford, also a veteran of the Tet Offensive, nicknamed Dye "Daddy D.A." and included him as a character in his novel The Short-Timers, later developed into the film Full Metal Jacket. Dye was sent to recuperate in a rear area, while the 2nd Battalion, 3rd Marines—the unit he had traveled with—was preparing for Operation Ford. Dye persuaded the battalion commander to let him accompany the battalion as a war correspondent. During the next week, the battalion engaged in firefights with units of the North Vietnamese People's Army of Vietnam (PAVN). On March 18, 1968, as the unit fought an all-night firefight, Dye replaced an assistant machine gunner who had been killed in an isolated position forward of the remainder of the battalion. Wounded, Dye exposed himself to intense enemy fire to retrieve ammunition for the machine gun to help hold off PAVN soldiers. During other engagements, he exposed himself to enemy fire to rescue several wounded Marines and a Navy corpsman. As a result of his actions, he was awarded the Bronze Star Medal with Combat "V" for VALOR device for heroism.

Dye served in Vietnam in 1965 and 1967–1970, participating in 31 combat operations over three tours of duty. After 13 years as an enlisted Marine, rising to the rank of master sergeant, Dye was appointed a warrant officer in 1976. While on active duty, he earned a Bachelor of Arts degree in English from the University of Maryland University College. Dye was later commissioned as an officer, and was deployed to Beirut for duty with the Multinational Force in Lebanon from 1982 to 1983. He retired from the Marine Corps in 1984 at the rank of captain. Dye was later awarded the Order of Saint Maurice for his contributions to infantry.

== Civilian career ==
After retiring, Dye became a correspondent for Soldier of Fortune magazine. He worked for the magazine for one year, during which he worked in Central America, providing guerrilla warfare training to troops in El Salvador and Nicaragua while reporting on conflicts in the region.

=== Technical advising ===
Determined to make Hollywood's depictions of battle more realistic, Dye founded Warriors, Inc., a company specializing in training actors in war films to portray their roles realistically, and provides research, planning, staging and on-set consultation for directors and other film-production personnel. In 1985, he pitched fellow Vietnam War veteran Oliver Stone a plan to put actors through a mock boot camp before production of the movie Platoon. Dye put the principal cast—including Charlie Sheen, Willem Dafoe, Johnny Depp, and Forest Whitaker—through an immersive 30-day military-style training regimen, limiting their food, water, and sleep, and firing blanks to keep them awake. Dye had a small role in the movie as Captain Harris and also wrote a novelization based on Stone's screenplay.

Dye also advised on the television miniseries Band of Brothers (2001), The Pacific (2010), and Masters of the Air. He also trained the actors in Saving Private Ryan, with Tom Hanks saying, "Without Dye we would have had zero authenticity in regard to our roles. His work permeated every scene."

=== Acting ===
After Platoon's critical success, Dye played a role in another Vietnam War movie, Casualties of War, and also prominently appeared as Colonel Robert Sink in the HBO miniseries Band of Brothers, on which his company also worked.

Dye appeared in Outbreak portraying Lieutenant Colonel Briggs, a U.S. Army officer. He played Theodore Roosevelt's superior officer Colonel Leonard Wood in the TNT miniseries Rough Riders. He appeared in Saving Private Ryan as an aide to General George Marshall; in Under Siege and Under Siege 2: Dark Territory as Captain Garza, an admiral's aide; in Spy Game as Commander Wiley during the rescue sequence; in Mission: Impossible as Frank Barnes of the CIA; in JFK as General Y; and in Starship Troopers as a high-ranking officer in the aftermath of the Brain Bug capture.

Dye played himself in Entourage, teaching fictional character Vincent Chase to scuba-dive in preparation for his role in Aquaman. He appeared in the 2010 film Knight and Day with Tom Cruise and Cameron Diaz, and in Larry Crowne with Tom Hanks the following year. He was the technical adviser for the 1994 Oliver Stone movie Natural Born Killers, making a brief appearance as a fictionalized, police-lieutenant version of himself. Dye played Col. Porter in the TNT science fiction series Falling Skies from 2011 to 2013. As of 2015 he was preparing to direct two films, No Better Place to Die, which he wrote, and Citizen Soldiers. He had a cameo appearance as New Founding Father Donald Talbott in the 2014 film The Purge: Anarchy.

=== Writing ===
Dye has written several novels, including Run Between the Raindrops in 1985 (also published as Citadel) and Conduct Unbecoming (1992), and the novelization of the film Platoon. Along with wife Julia and comic-book artist Gerry Kissell, Dye created the critically acclaimed and best-selling graphic novel Code Word: Geronimo (IDW Publishing, 2011), which tells the story of the Navy SEAL raid on Osama bin Laden's compound.

=== Radio and video games ===
During the Iraq War, Dye was hired as a military commentator by radio station KFI AM 640 in Los Angeles and given a two-hour radio show. He hosted the History Channel's documentary series The Conquerors. He was featured in two tracks on Hoobastank's CD Every Man for Himself.

Dye consulted during development of the Medal of Honor video games series, and lent his voice and likeness to the character Gunnery Sergeant Jack Lauton in Medal of Honor: Rising Sun. He reprised his role as Colonel Robert Sink in the Brothers in Arms video game series, for which he also provided his likeness.

== Bibliography ==
- Dye, Captain Dale & Dye, Dr. Julia (2011). Code Word: Geronimo. San Diego, California: IDW Publishing. ISBN 978-1613770979.
- Dye, Dale (1992). Conduct Unbecoming (paperback ed.). New York: Berkley Publishing Group. ISBN 0425132366.
- Dye, Dale A. (2013). Beirut File. Shake Davis Series (paperback ed.). North Hills, California: Warriors Publishing Group. ISBN 978-0989798303.
- Dye, Dale A. (2012). Chosin File. Shake Davis Series (paperback ed.). North Hills, California: Warriors Publishing Group. ISBN 978-0985338800.
- Dye, Dale A. (2014). Contra File. Shake Davis Series (paperback ed.). North Hills, California: Warriors Publishing Group. ISBN 978-0989798341.
- Dye, Dale A. (2008). Laos File. Shake Davis Series (paperback ed.). North Hills, California: Warriors Publishing Group. ISBN 978-0982167007.
- Dye, Dale A. (2013). Outrage: Author's Preferred Edition (paperback ed.). North Hills, California: Warriors Publishing Group. ISBN 978-0985338855.
- Dye, Dale A. (2010). Peleliu File. Shake Davis Series (paperback ed.). North Hills, California: Warriors Publishing Group. ISBN 978-0982167014.
- Dye, Dale A. (1986). Platoon. New York: Charter Books. ISBN 1121560644.
- Dye, Dale A. (1985). Run Between the Raindrops (paperback ed.). North Hills, California: Warriors Publishing Group. ISBN 978-0989798372.
- Dye, Dale A. & Laemlein, Tom (2015). Small Arms of the Vietnam War: A Photographic Study. North Hills, California: Warriors Publishing Group. ISBN 978-0986195518.

== Filmography ==
=== Film ===
Year	Film	Role	Notes
1986	Platoon	Captain Harris	
1986	Invaders from Mars	Squad Leader	
1988	The Beast	Helicopter Crew Chief	
1989	Always	Don	
1989	Born on the Fourth of July	Infantry Colonel	
1989	Casualties of War	Captain Hill	
1989	The Favorite	French Officer	
1990	Kid	Garvey	
1990	Fire Birds	Colonel A.K. McNeil	
1990	The Fourth War	Sergeant Major	
1990	Spontaneous Combustion	General	
1991	JFK	General Y	
1991	Servants of Twilight	Police Officer	
1992	Under Siege	Captain Nick Garza	
1993	Heaven & Earth	Larry	
1993	Cover Story	Jack	
1994	Endangered	Ricky	
1994	Guarding Tess	CIA Agent Charles Ivy	
1994	Natural Born Killers	Officer Dale Wrigley	
1994	Blue Sky	Colonel Mike Anwalt	
1994	The Puppet Masters	Brande	
1995	Outbreak	Lieutenant Colonel Briggs	
1995	Under Siege 2: Dark Territory	Captain Nick Garza	
1996	Sgt. Bilko	First Engineer	
1996	Mission: Impossible	IMF Agent Frank Barnes	
1997	Trial and Error	Dr. German Stone	
1997	Starship Troopers	Mobile Infantry General	
1998	Saving Private Ryan	War Department Colonel	
1999	A Table for One	Vernon Harpwood	
2000	Rules of Engagement	General Perry	
2001	Spy Game	Commander Wiley	
2003	Missing Brendan	General Temekin	
2005	The Great Raid	General Krueger	
2007	Music Within	Captain Ruzicka	
2010	Knight and Day	Frank Jenkins	
2011	Naked Run	Harry	
2011	Larry Crowne	Cox	
2014	Planes: Fire & Rescue	Cabbie (voice)	
2014	The Purge: Anarchy	Donald Talbott, New Founding Father	
2016	Sniper Special Ops	Lieutenant Colonel Jackson	
2016	Range 15	President Mattis	
2019	The Last Full Measure	Senator Holt	
2021	Green Ghost and the Masters of the Stone	General Moorland	
2023	The Caine Mutiny Court-Martial	Vice Admiral R.T. Dewey	

=== Television ===
Year	Film	Role	Notes
1987	Billionaire Boys Club	Defense Attorney	Uncredited
1988	Supercarrier	Captain Henry K. "Hank" Madigan	
1988	Tales from the Hollywood Hills: Closed Set	Assistant Director	TV movie
1989	The Neon Empire	Chief Bates	TV movie
1990	The Court-Martial of Jackie Robinson	Colonel Paul L. Bates	TV movie
1991	Mission of the Shark: The Saga of the U.S.S. Indianapolis	Major Green	TV movie
1991	L.A. Law	President Colonel Kenners	Episode: "Rest in Pieces"
1992	Raven	Colonel Paul David Mackay	Episode: "Is Someone Crazy in Here or Is It Me"
1992	Dead On: Relentless II	Captain Rivers	
1995–1998	JAG	Sergeant Major Hollis	Episode: "Desert Son"
1996	Space: Above and Beyond	Major Jack Colquitt	Episode: "Who Monitors the Birds?"
1996	Within the Rock	General Hurst	TV movie
1997	Rough Riders	Colonel Leonard Wood	TV miniseries
1998	JAG	Colonel Bill Cobb	Episode: "Mr. Rabb Goes to Washington"
1998	Seven Days	General Cole	Episode: "Doppleganger: Part 1"
1998	Operation Delta Force 2: Mayday	Captain Halsey Lang	TV movie
1999	Air America	Captain Gage	Episode: "The Court-Martial of Rio Arnett"
1999–2004	Rocket Power	Lieutenant Tice Ryan (voice)	Recurring cast
1999	Mutiny	Unknown	TV movie
2000	The Others	Captain Ken Radley	Episode: "Souls on Board"
2001	Band of Brothers	Colonel Robert Sink	7 episodes
2003	44 Minutes: The North Hollywood Shoot-Out	SWAT Lieutenant	TV movie
2005–2010	Entourage	Firearms Instructor / Scuba Instructor / Himself	3 episodes
2006	Las Vegas	Sergeant Burn	Episode: "And Here's Mike with the Weather"
2006	Commander in Chief	General Peter Allyson	3 episodes
2007	The Loop	Ralph Somkin	Episode: "The Stranger"
2007	Chuck	General Stanfield	Episode: "Chuck Versus the Intersect"
2010	Cold Case	Al Wasserlauf	Episode: "Free Love"
2011–2013	Falling Skies	Colonel / General Porter	11 episodes

=== Video games ===
Year	Film	Role	Notes
1995	Platoon (American Laser Games) (Unreleased)	Captain Harris	
1999	Medal of Honor	Opening Movie Narrator (voice)	
2002	Medal of Honor: Allied Assault	Narration In Training (voice)	
2003	Medal of Honor: Rising Sun	Gunnery Sergeant Jack "Gunny" Lauton (voice)	
2005	Medal of Honor: European Assault	OSS Handler / Multiplayer Narrator	
2005	Battlefield 2: Modern Combat	Lieutenant Colonel Bob Scott (voice)	
2007	Brothers in Arms: Hell's Highway	Colonel Robert Sink (voice)	

== Military awards ==
Dye's military decorations and awards include:

Bronze Star Medal w/ Combat "V"
Purple Heart w/ two 5/16" Gold Stars
Meritorious Service Medal
Joint Service Commendation Medal
Navy and Marine Corps Commendation Medal w/ Combat "V" and one 5/16" Gold Star
Air Force Commendation Medal
Navy and Marine Corps Achievement Medal w/ Combat "V"
Combat Action Ribbon w/ one 5/16" Gold Star
Navy Presidential Unit Citation w/ three 3/16" bronze stars
Navy Unit Commendation w/ one 3/16" bronze star
Meritorious Unit Commendation w/ one 3/16" bronze star
Marine Corps Good Conduct Medal w/ three 3/16" bronze stars
Marine Corps Expeditionary Medal
National Defense Service Medal
Armed Forces Expeditionary Medal
Vietnam Service Medal w/ three 3/16" bronze stars
Humanitarian Service Medal
Sea Service Deployment Ribbon w/ two 3/16" bronze stars
Navy and Marine Corps Overseas Service Ribbon
Republic of Vietnam Staff Service Medal (2nd Class)
Republic of Vietnam Meritorious Unit Citation (Gallantry Cross) w/ Palm
Republic of Vietnam Meritorious Unit Citation (Civil Actions) w/ Palm
Republic of Vietnam Campaign Medal w/ 1960– Device

== See also ==
- List of notable people from Missouri
- List of notable United States Marines
