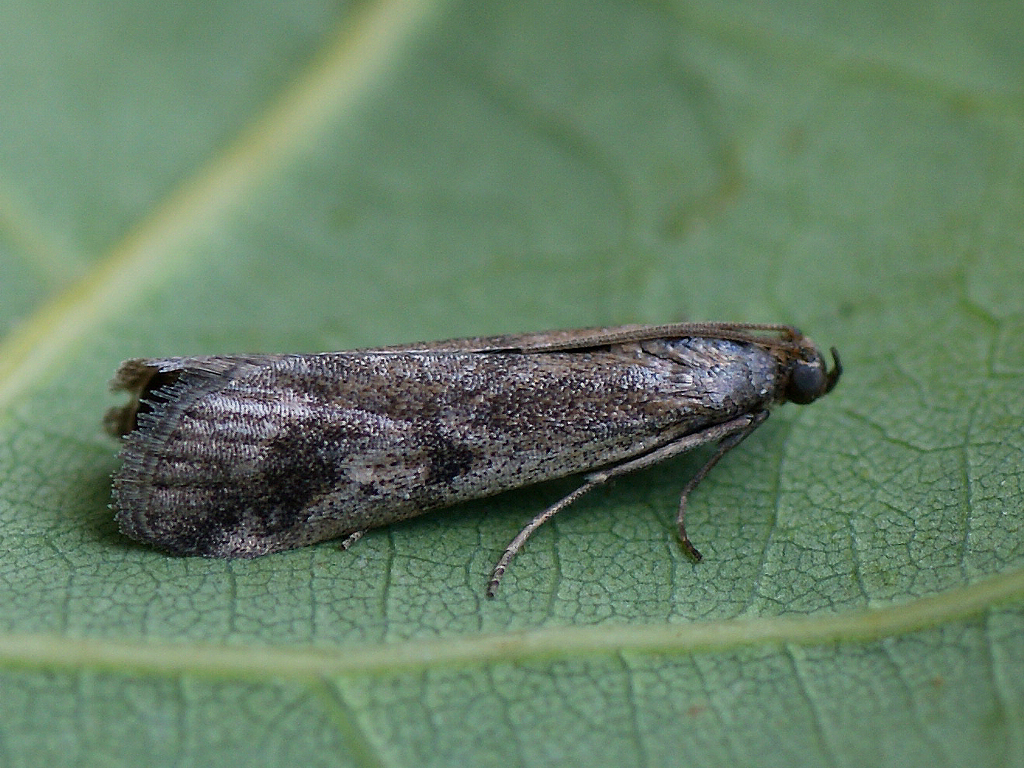

Scientific classification
- Kingdom: Animalia
- Phylum: Arthropoda
- Clade: Pancrustacea
- Class: Insecta
- Order: Lepidoptera
- Family: Pyralidae
- Genus: Euzophera
- Species: E. cinerosella

Binomial name
- Euzophera cinerosella (Zeller, 1839)

Synonyms
- Myelois cinerosella Zeller, 1839; Euzophera cinerosella politella Ragonot, 1887; Phycis cinerosella incanella Eversmann, 1844; Euzophera pimelcella Zerny in Osthelder, 1935; Myelois artemisiella Stainton, 1859

= Euzophera cinerosella =

Species of moth

Euzophera cinerosella is a species of snout moth in the genus Euzophera. It was described by Zeller in 1839. It is found in most of Europe (except the Benelux, Ireland, Portugal and Ukraine), Turkey, Russia and China.

The wingspan 23–28 mm. Adults are on wing from May to August.

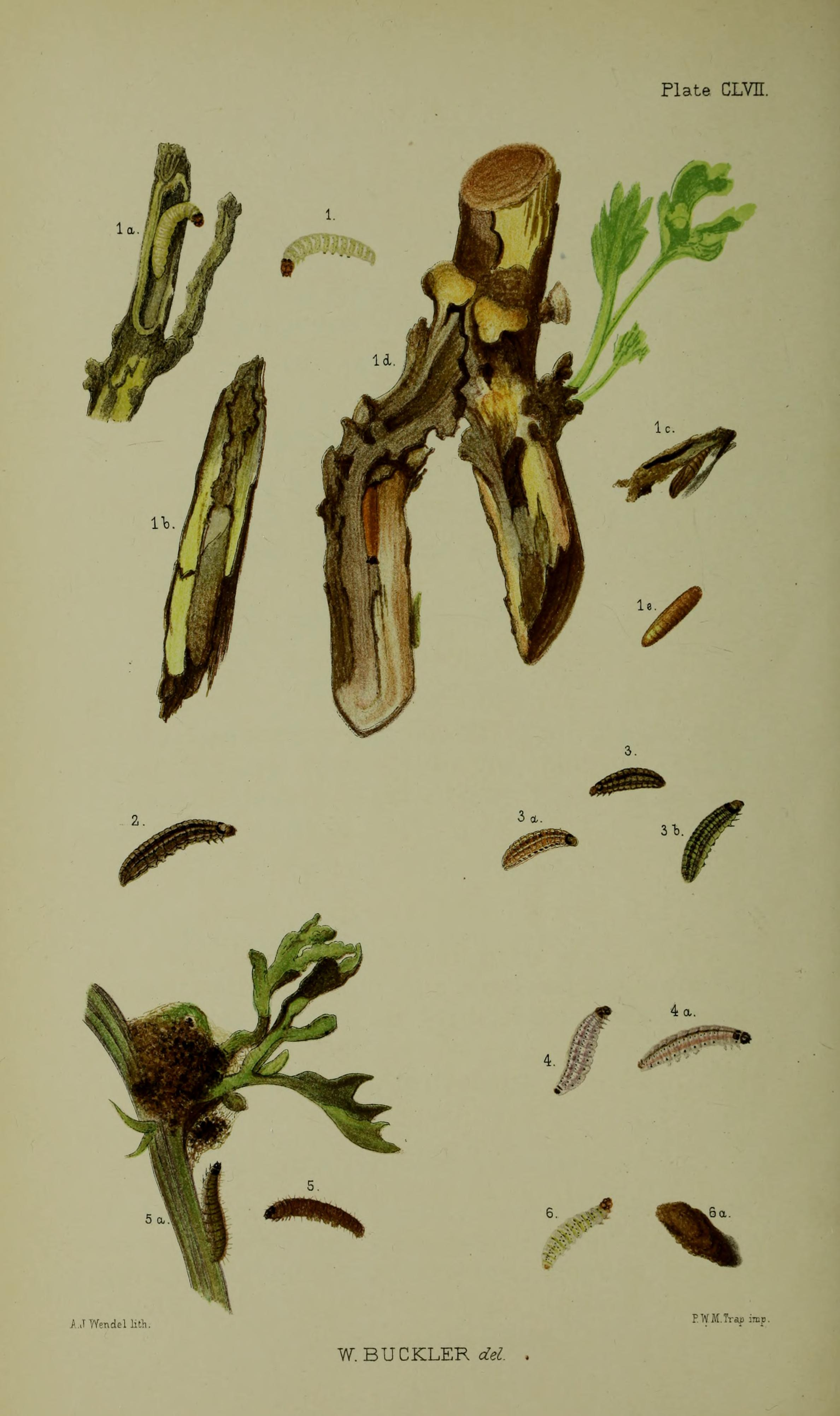
Figs. 1 larva after final moult 1a larva in situ, 1b cocoon in situ, 1c pupa in situ, 1d, 1e pupa of Lissonota hortorum the destructive parasite of this species

The larvae feed on Artemisia absinthium. They feed internally in the roots.
