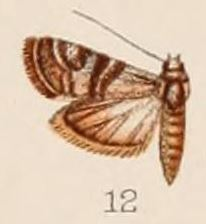

Scientific classification
- Kingdom: Animalia
- Phylum: Arthropoda
- Clade: Pancrustacea
- Class: Insecta
- Order: Lepidoptera
- Family: Pyralidae
- Genus: Euzophera
- Species: E. cocciphaga

Binomial name
- Euzophera cocciphaga Hampson, 1908

= Euzophera cocciphaga =

Species of moth

Euzophera cocciphaga is a species of snout moth in the genus Euzophera. It was described by George Hampson in 1908 and is known from India.

This species has a wingspan of 24 mm and the larvae lives under a Coccidae (scale insect) on which it feeds.
