= Euzophera decaryella =

Scientific classification
- Kingdom: Animalia
- Phylum: Arthropoda
- Clade: Pancrustacea
- Class: Insecta
- Order: Lepidoptera
- Family: Pyralidae
- Genus: Euzophera
- Species: E. decaryella

Binomial name
- Euzophera decaryella (Marion & Viette, 1956)

Synonyms
- Alispoides decaryella Marion & Viette, 1956

Species of moth

Euzophera decaryella is a species of snout moth in the genus Euzophera. It was described by Hubert Marion and Pierre Viette in 1956, and is known from Madagascar.
