= Euzophera subcribrella =

Scientific classification
- Kingdom: Animalia
- Phylum: Arthropoda
- Clade: Pancrustacea
- Class: Insecta
- Order: Lepidoptera
- Family: Pyralidae
- Genus: Euzophera
- Species: E. subcribrella

Binomial name
- Euzophera subcribrella Ragonot, 1887

Species of moth

Euzophera subcribrella is a species of snout moth in the genus Euzophera. It was described by Ragonot in 1887. It is found in Spain and Turkmenistan.

The wingspan is about 18 mm.
