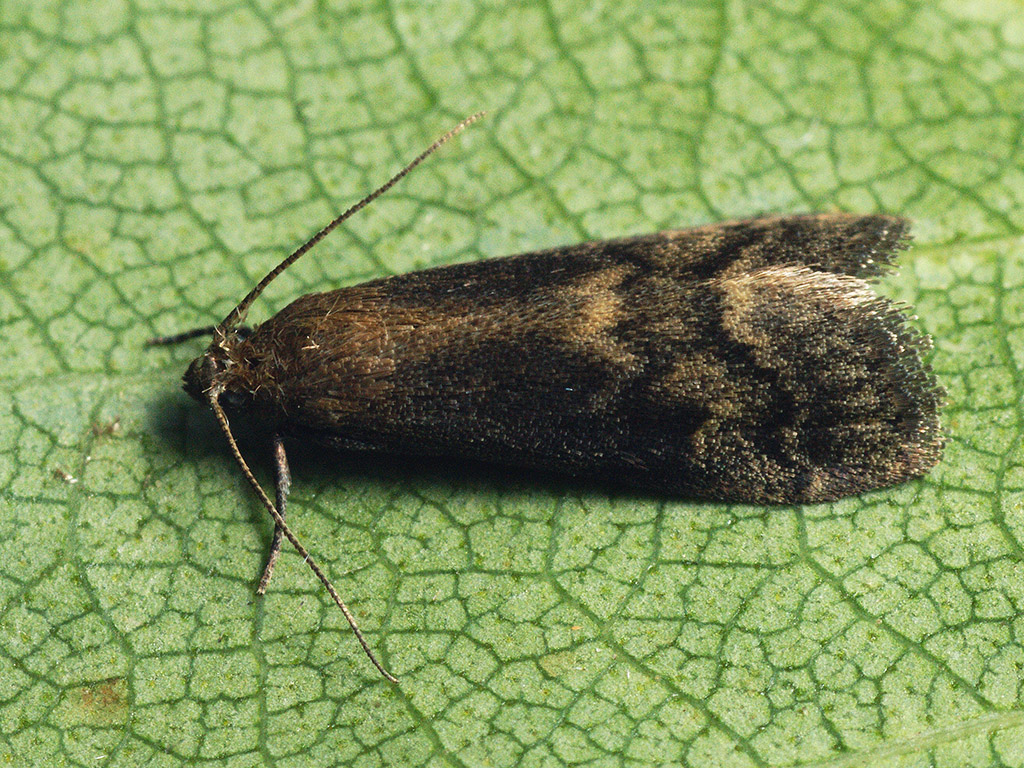

Scientific classification
- Kingdom: Animalia
- Phylum: Arthropoda
- Clade: Pancrustacea
- Class: Insecta
- Order: Lepidoptera
- Family: Pyralidae
- Genus: Euzophera
- Species: E. fuliginosella

Binomial name
- Euzophera fuliginosella (Heinemann, 1865)

Synonyms
- Stenoptycha fuliginosella Heinemann, 1865

= Euzophera fuliginosella =

Species of moth

Euzophera fuliginosella is a species of snout moth in the genus Euzophera. It was described by Hermann von Heinemann in 1865. It is found in most of Europe, except Great Britain, Ireland, Norway and the western part of the Balkan Peninsula.

The wingspan is 15–20 mm.

The larvae feed on Betula species.
