= Euzophera climosa =

Scientific classification
- Kingdom: Animalia
- Phylum: Arthropoda
- Clade: Pancrustacea
- Class: Insecta
- Order: Lepidoptera
- Family: Pyralidae
- Genus: Euzophera
- Species: E. climosa

Binomial name
- Euzophera climosa Dyar, 1914

Species of moth

Euzophera climosa is a species of snout moth in the genus Euzophera. It was described by Harrison Gray Dyar Jr. in 1914. It is found in Central America (including Panama) and northern South America (including French Guiana).
