= Euzophera =

- Euzophera villora

Scientific classification
- Kingdom: Animalia
- Phylum: Arthropoda
- Clade: Pancrustacea
- Class: Insecta
- Order: Lepidoptera
- Family: Pyralidae
- Tribe: Phycitini
- Genus: Euzophera; Zeller, 1867

Synonyms
- Stenoptycha Heinemann, 1865; Melia Heinemann, 1865; Pistogenes Meyrick, 1937; Ahwazia Amsel, 1949; Cymbalorissa Gozmány, 1958; Longignathia Roesler, 1965; Quadrempista Roesler, 1973

Genus of moths

Euzophera is a genus of snout moths. It was described by Philipp Christoph Zeller in 1867.

== Species ==
- Subgenus Euzophera Zeller, 1867
  - Euzophera albicostalis Hampson, 1903
  - Euzophera alpherakyella Ragonot, 1887
  - Euzophera bigella (Zeller, 1848)
  - Euzophera cinerosella (Zeller, 1839)
  - Euzophera costivittella Ragonot, 1887
  - Euzophera formosella (Rebel, 1910)
  - Euzophera lunulella (Costa, 1836)
  - Euzophera nessebarella Soffner, 1962
  - Euzophera osseatella (Treitschke, 1832)
  - Euzophera perticella Ragonot, 1888
  - Euzophera pinguis (Haworth, 1811) – tabby knot-horn
  - Euzophera pulchella Ragonot, 1887
  - Euzophera rubricetella (Herrich-Schäffer, 1855)
  - Euzophera subcribrella Ragonot, 1887
  - Euzophera tetragramma (Rebel, 1910)
  - Euzophera umbrosella (Staudinger, 1880)
- Subgenus Cymbalorissa Gozmány, 1958
  - Euzophera fuliginosella (Heinemann, 1865)
- Subgenus unknown
  - Euzophera afflictella Ragonot, 1887
  - Euzophera aglaeella Ragonot, 1887
  - Euzophera albipunctella Ragonot, 1887
  - Euzophera atuntsealis Roesler, 1973
  - Euzophera batangensis Caradja, 1939
  - Euzophera climosa Dyar, 1914
  - Euzophera cocciphaga Hampson, 1908
  - Euzophera comeella Roesler, 1973
  - Euzophera conquassata Roesler, 1970
  - Euzophera conquistador Dyar, 1914
  - Euzophera cornutella (Roesler, 1965)
  - Euzophera crassignatha Balinsky, 1994
  - Euzophera crinita Balinsky, 1994
  - Euzophera decaryella (Marion & Viette, 1956)
  - Euzophera eureka Roesler, 1970
  - Euzophera fibigerella Asselbergs, 1997
  - Euzophera flagella (Lederer, 1869)
  - Euzophera flavicosta Turner, 1947
  - Euzophera habrella Neunzig, 1990
  - Euzophera hemileuca de Joannis, 1927
  - Euzophera hudeibella Roesler, 1973
  - Euzophera hulli Asselbergs, 2009
  - Euzophera mercatrix (Meyrick, 1937)
  - Euzophera mienshani (Caradja, 1939)
  - Euzophera minima Balinsky, 1994
  - Euzophera mabes Dyar, 1914
  - Euzophera magnolialis Capps, 1964
  - Euzophera neomeniella Ragonot, 1888
  - Euzophera nigricantella Ragonot, 1887
  - Euzophera ostricolorella Hulst, 1890 – tuliptree borer, root collar borer
  - Euzophera paghmanicola Roesler, 1973
  - Euzophera postflavida Dyar, 1923
  - Euzophera pyriell Yang, 1994
  - Euzophera rinmea Dyar, 1914
  - Euzophera sagax Meyrick, 1935
  - Euzophera scabrella Ragonot, 1888
  - Euzophera sogai Roesler, 1982
  - Euzophera speculum de Joannis, 1927
  - Euzophera scabrella Ragonot, 1888
  - Euzophera semifuneralis (Walker, 1863) – American plum borer
  - Euzophera stramentella Ragonot, 1888
  - Euzophera subnitidella Ragonot, 1887
  - Euzophera termivelata Balinsky, 1994
  - Euzophera tintilla Dyar, 1914
  - Euzophera trigeminata Warren & Rothschild, 1905
  - Euzophera ultimella Roesler, 1973
  - Euzophera villora (C. Felder, R. Felder & Rogenhofer, 1875)
  - Euzophera vinnulella Neunzig, 1990
