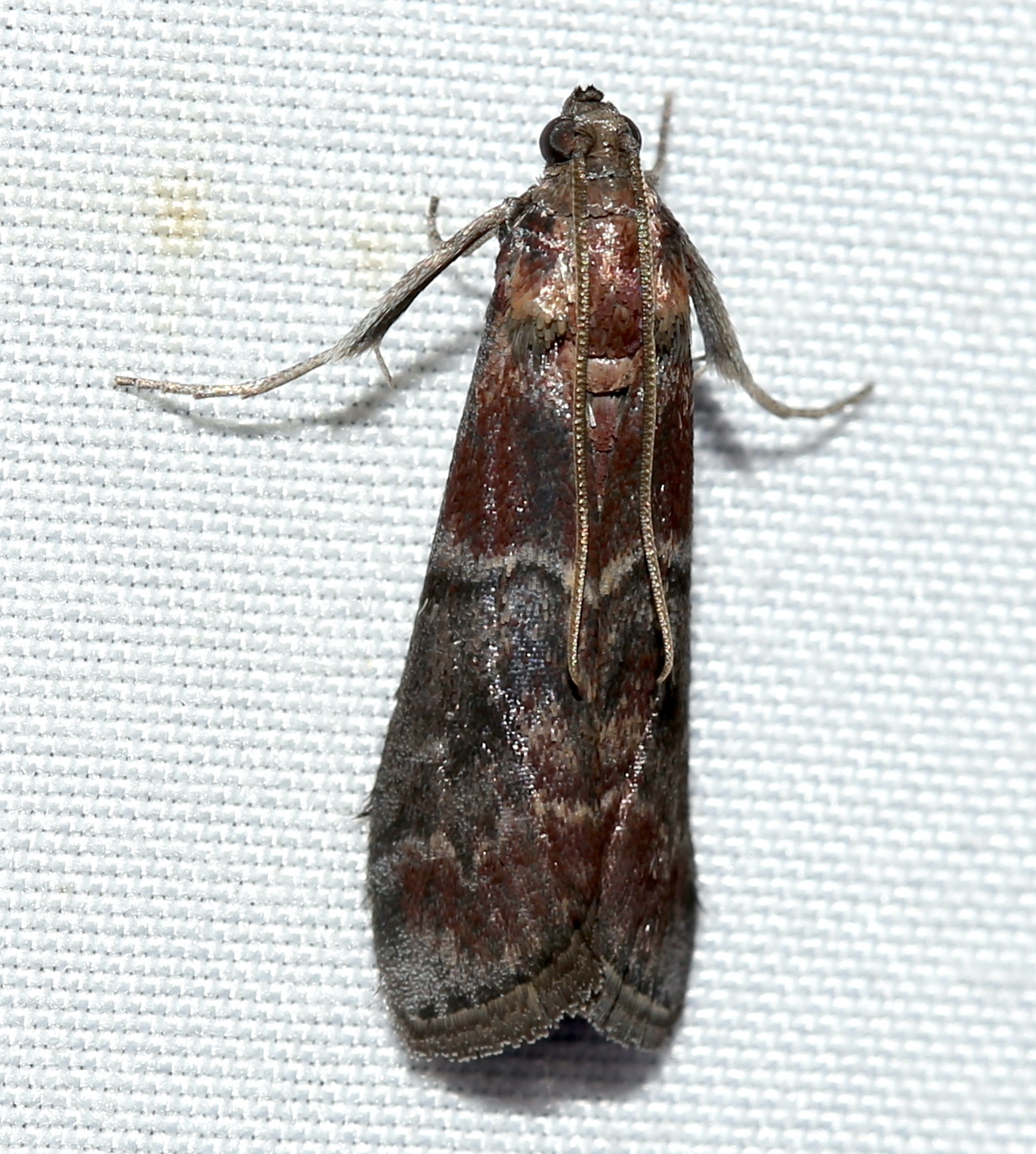

Scientific classification
- Kingdom: Animalia
- Phylum: Arthropoda
- Clade: Pancrustacea
- Class: Insecta
- Order: Lepidoptera
- Family: Pyralidae
- Genus: Euzophera
- Species: E. ostricolorella

Binomial name
- Euzophera ostricolorella Hulst, 1890

= Euzophera ostricolorella =

Species of moth

Euzophera ostricolorella, the root collar borer moth or tuliptree borer, is a species of moth of the family Pyralidae. It was described by George Duryea Hulst in 1890. The species is found in the United States from Arkansas and Louisiana to northern Florida, north to Michigan and New York.

The wingspan is 30–41 mm. Adults are on wing from April to June and again from August to October in two generations in the southern part of the range.

The larvae feed on Liriodendron tulipifera.
