= Euzophera alpherakyella =

Scientific classification
- Kingdom: Animalia
- Phylum: Arthropoda
- Clade: Pancrustacea
- Class: Insecta
- Order: Lepidoptera
- Family: Pyralidae
- Genus: Euzophera
- Species: E. alpherakyella

Binomial name
- Euzophera alpherakyella Ragonot, 1887

Species of moth

Euzophera alpherakyella is a species of snout moth in the genus Euzophera. It was described by Ragonot in 1887. It is found in Russia and China.

The wingspan is 22–27 mm.
