= Euzophera albicostalis =

Scientific classification
- Kingdom: Animalia
- Phylum: Arthropoda
- Clade: Pancrustacea
- Class: Insecta
- Order: Lepidoptera
- Family: Pyralidae
- Genus: Euzophera
- Species: E. albicostalis

Binomial name
- Euzophera albicostalis Hampson, 1903

Synonyms
- Ahwazia albocostalis Amsel, 1949

Species of moth

Euzophera albicostalis is a species of snout moth in the genus Euzophera. It was described by George Hampson in 1903. It is found in Russia, India and Iran.

The wingspan is about 26 mm. The forewings are pale brown, irrorated (sprinkled) with fuscous. The hindwings are pale brown, tinged with fuscous towards the costa.
