= Euzophera umbrosella =

Scientific classification
- Kingdom: Animalia
- Phylum: Arthropoda
- Clade: Pancrustacea
- Class: Insecta
- Order: Lepidoptera
- Family: Pyralidae
- Genus: Euzophera
- Species: E. umbrosella

Binomial name
- Euzophera umbrosella (Staudinger, 1879)

Synonyms
- Myelois umbrosella Staudinger, 1879; Euzophera albogilvella Ragonot, 1887

Species of moth

Euzophera umbrosella is a species of snout moth in the genus Euzophera. It was described by Staudinger in 1879. It is found in Greece, Crete and Cyprus, as well as Turkey and Iran.

The wingspan is 17–19 mm.
