= Euzophera comeella =

Scientific classification
- Kingdom: Animalia
- Phylum: Arthropoda
- Clade: Pancrustacea
- Class: Insecta
- Order: Lepidoptera
- Family: Pyralidae
- Genus: Euzophera
- Species: E. comeella

Binomial name
- Euzophera comeella Roesler, 1973

Species of moth

Euzophera comeella is a species of snout moth in the genus Euzophera. It was described by Roesler in 1973, and is known from Iran.
