= Euzophera sogai =

Scientific classification
- Kingdom: Animalia
- Phylum: Arthropoda
- Clade: Pancrustacea
- Class: Insecta
- Order: Lepidoptera
- Family: Pyralidae
- Genus: Euzophera
- Species: E. sogai

Binomial name
- Euzophera sogai Roesler, 1982

Species of moth

Euzophera sogai is a species of snout moth in the genus Euzophera. It was described by Roesler in 1982, and is known from Madagascar.
