= Euzophera eureka =

Scientific classification
- Kingdom: Animalia
- Phylum: Arthropoda
- Clade: Pancrustacea
- Class: Insecta
- Order: Lepidoptera
- Family: Pyralidae
- Genus: Euzophera
- Species: E. eureka

Binomial name
- Euzophera eureka Roesler, 1970

Species of moth

Euzophera eureka is a species of snout moth in the genus Euzophera. It was described by Roesler in 1970, and is known from Mongolia.
