= Euzophera mercatrix =

Scientific classification
- Kingdom: Animalia
- Phylum: Arthropoda
- Clade: Pancrustacea
- Class: Insecta
- Order: Lepidoptera
- Family: Pyralidae
- Genus: Euzophera
- Species: E. mercatrix

Binomial name
- Euzophera mercatrix (Meyrick, 1937)

Synonyms
- Pistogenes mercatrix Meyrick, 1937

Species of moth

Euzophera mercatrix is a species of snout moth in the genus Euzophera. It was described by Edward Meyrick in 1937 and is known from Iraq. The name is a synonym of Euzophera subcribrella Ragonot 1887.
