= Euzophera flavicosta =

Scientific classification
- Kingdom: Animalia
- Phylum: Arthropoda
- Clade: Pancrustacea
- Class: Insecta
- Order: Lepidoptera
- Family: Pyralidae
- Genus: Euzophera
- Species: E. flavicosta

Binomial name
- Euzophera flavicosta Turner, 1947

Species of moth

Euzophera flavicosta is a species of snout moth in the genus Euzophera. It was described by Alfred Jefferis Turner in 1947 and is found in Australia.
