= Euzophera magnolialis =

Scientific classification
- Kingdom: Animalia
- Phylum: Arthropoda
- Clade: Pancrustacea
- Class: Insecta
- Order: Lepidoptera
- Family: Pyralidae
- Genus: Euzophera
- Species: E. magnolialis

Binomial name
- Euzophera magnolialis Capps, 1964

Species of moth

Euzophera magnolialis, the magnolia root borer, is a species of snout moth in the genus Euzophera. It was described by Hahn William Capps in 1964. It is found in the southern United States.

The wingspan is 34–41 mm.

The larvae feed on Magnolia grandiflora. The larvae bore the roots of their host plant.
