= Conquer =

Conquer may refer to:

- Conquer (Soulfly album), 2008
- Conquer (Carl Thomas album), 2011
- "Conquer" (The Walking Dead), an episode of the television series The Walking Dead

== See also ==
- Conquistador (disambiguation)
- Conqueror (disambiguation)
- Conquest (disambiguation)
