= The Conquerors (TV series) =

- Genre: Documentary
- Presented by: Dale Dye
- Music by: Michael Richard Plowman (9 episodes)
- Country of origin: United States
- Original language: English
- No. of seasons: 1
- No. of episodes: 12

Production
- Running time: 60 minutes
- Production companies: Greystone Television; History Channel; Invictus Films

Original release
- Release: March 2005 – 2005

The Conquerors is history documentary television series that looks at famous leaders, such as Cortés, Andrew Jackson and others, and shows how they rose to prominence and vanquished enemies on the field.

== Broadcast and release ==
=== Episodes ===
- Episode 1 - William the Conqueror
- Episode 2 - General William Howe, Conqueror of New York
- Episode 3 - Andrew Jackson, Conqueror of Florida
- Episode 4 - Cortés, Conqueror of Mexico
- Episode 5 - John C. Fremont, Conqueror of California
- Episode 6 - El Cid
- Episode 7 - Marshal Zhukov, World War II Conqueror of Berlin
- Episode 8 - Sherman's March to the Sea
- Episode 9 - Cromwell, Conqueror of Ireland
- Episode 10 - King David
- Episode 11 - Napoleon's Greatest Victory
- Episode 12 - Caesar, Conqueror of Gaul

== Cast and Crew ==
=== Series Writing Credits ===
- Alexander Emmert ... (4 episodes, 2005)
- Doug Cohen ... (1 episode, 2005)
- Martin Kent ... (1 episode, 2005)
- Scott Billups ... (unknown episodes)
- Sonya Gay Bourn ... (unknown episodes)
- Andrew Nock ... (unknown episodes)

=== Series Cast ===
- Dale Dye ... Himself - Host (12 episodes)
- Roger McGrath ... Himself (2 episodes)
- Dana Lombardi ... Himself (1 episode)
- Conquerors ... Lady #1 (1 episode)
- Joe di Gennaro ... Archery Battalion (1 episode)
- Richard Handley ... Philistine (1 episode)
- Richard Jones ... Himself - Historian (1 episode)
- Aren Maefr ... Himself (1 episode)
- J. Sears McFee ... Himself (1 episode)
- Davy Perez ... King Reynaldo (1 episode)
- Douglas Sunlin ... Anglo-Saxon warrior (1 episode)
- Joseph Tatner ... General William Howe (1 episode)
- Koren Young ... King David's Soldier (1 episode)
