= Duell (game) =

Chess variant

	a	b	c	d	e	f	g	h	i
8	a8 five	b8 one	c8 two	d8 six	e8 one	f8 six	g8 two	h8 one	i8 five	8
7	a7	b7	c7	d7	e7	f7	g7	h7	i7	7
6	a6	b6	c6	d6	e6	f6	g6	h6	i6	6
5	a5	b5	c5	d5	e5	f5	g5	h5	i5	5
4	a4	b4	c4	d4	e4	f4	g4	h4	i4	4
3	a3	b3	c3	d3	e3	f3	g3	h3	i3	3
2	a2	b2	c2	d2	e2	f2	g2	h2	i2	2
1	a1 five	b1 one	c1 two	d1 six	e1 one	f1 six	g1 two	h1 one	i1 five	1
	a	b	c	d	e	f	g	h	i

starting position and numbers of Duell

Duell, also published under other names, is a two-player board game played with dice on a board of 9×8 squares. Players take turns moving one of their dice in order to capture their opponent's pieces, with the ultimate aim of capturing the opponent's key piece to win the game. It is considered a chess variant.

Designed by Geoffrey Hayes, it was previously published in the UK by Denys Fisher (1975) as Conquest and The George v Mildred Dice Game and in Germany as Tactix, in the US by Lakeside Industries as Duell and in Portugal by Dinamização/ASA as The O Game.

== Setup ==
The board is placed between the two players such that the eight rows of nine squares run left to right. The pieces are placed so that from left to right the following numbers appear face up: five, one, two, six, "key piece," six, two, one, five. The "key piece" (equivalent to the king in chess) is a custom die with special marks on each face. The three-side of each dice face towards the controlling player.

To ensure true fairness, each die should be of the same chirality. That is, the arrangement of the faces about the vertices should run the same direction.

== Gameplay ==
Players take turns moving one piece the number of squares shown on the outermost face (at the start of that move) by "rolling" it along the direction of travel such that the uppermost number changes with each square moved. A move may optionally include a single 90-degree change in direction. Moves may not pass through existing pieces of either color.

Opposing pieces are captured by landing on the occupied square with the final move.

The game finishes when one of the players captures their opponent's key piece; the capturing player wins, or when a players' key piece lands in the opponent's "key space" (the square initially occupied by the key piece at the start of the game, in the center of the home row).

== Reviews ==
- Games #2
- Games & Puzzles
