= The Conquest =

The Conquest may refer to:

- The Norman conquest of England in 1066
- The Spanish Conquest of the Aztec Empire in 1519
- The Conquest of 1760, where England acquired parts of New France during the French and Indian War or Seven Years' War
- The Conquest (1973 film), a Canadian film directed by Jacques Gagné
- The Conquest (1996 film), a Hungarian film
- The Conquest (TV series), a Chinese historical drama that aired in 2006 and 2007
- The Conquest (2011 film), a French film
