= Euzophera conquistador =

Scientific classification
- Kingdom: Animalia
- Phylum: Arthropoda
- Clade: Pancrustacea
- Class: Insecta
- Order: Lepidoptera
- Family: Pyralidae
- Genus: Euzophera
- Species: E. conquistador

Binomial name
- Euzophera conquistador Dyar, 1914

Species of moth

Euzophera conquistador is a species of snout moth (Pyralidae) that belongs to the tribe Phycitini. This species is known from Panama.

The species was described in 1914 by Harrison Gray Dyar Jr., an American entomologist.
