= Conquest (play-by-mail game) =

Conquest is a play-by-mail game that was published by Earnshaw Enterprises.

== Publication history ==
Conquest was a computer-moderated play-by-mail game. The game did not have turn deadlines or schedule. Earnshaw Enterprises used the computer-moderated Instantreply system to process turns received and mail out replies the following day.

== Description ==
=== Setting ===
The game is set in a feudal kingdom of ten provinces, with five towns in each province. Each game starts with ten players, each of whom controls one province.

=== Gameplay ===
Finances and combat are the two primary elements of gameplay.

==== Finances ====
Towns generate varying levels of revenue every turn. This can be spent on troops, spies, counterspies, emissaries, fortifications, agricultural investment, and feeding the people.

==== Combat ====
Players can hire up to six troop types every turn, with varying costs and effectiveness.

=== Victory conditions ===
The first player to control all ten provinces wins the game.

== Reception ==
In the February–March 1990 issue of White Wolf, Stephan and Stewart Wieck called it "a game of rapid action and aggressive tactics. There is little room for diplomacy and interplayer communication." They suggested that because of the lack of turn deadlines or a schedule, a player who submitted turns very quickly might gain an unfair advantage. They thought the game was good for beginners due to its "low complexity and relatively low cost", but believed it was a game that experienced player would also enjoy due to "the speed of the game and its processing efficiency." They concluded by giving the game an average rating of 3 out of 5, saying, "Between the computer moderation, fantastic Turn Sheets, and consistent service, Conquest is a very smooth running game which doesn't require much busy work from its players. Despite its shortcomings in realism, it's a fun game to play which, in the end, is really all that matters."

== See also ==
- List of play-by-mail games

== Bibliography ==
- "Gameline: Earnshaw Enterprises". Paper Mayhem. No. 36. May–June 1989. p. 22.
- Kavanagh, Brendon (October 1986). "PBM Mailbox: Conquest". Crash. No. 33.
