= The Conquerors (board game) =

Board wargame set in Ancient history

The Conquerors is a package of two board wargames published by Simulations Publications Inc. (SPI) in 1977. One game, The Macedonians, simulates the invasion of Persia by Alexander the Great, and the other, The Romans, covers the eastward expansion of the Roman Empire following the Second Punic War.

== Description ==
=== Components ===
The game includes:

- two 22" x 34" paper hex grid maps scaled at 20 mi (32 km ) per hex that together display the Mediterranean Sea. The eastern-most map is used for The Macedonians; both maps are used for The Romans.
- two 22-page rulebooks (one for each game)
- 1200 die-cut counters
- Tactical display
- Various charts and players' aids
- Two six-sided dice

=== The Macedonians ===
This is a two-player game in which one player controls the Macedonian armies of Alexander the Great as they invade Persia in 334–331 BCE, and the other player represents the Achaemenid Empire under Darius III. Players earn victory points by controlling regions and cities, and by winning battles. The player with the most victory points at the end of the game is the winner

==== Gameplay ====
Each turn, the Persians are active first and have three phases:

- Campaign: The Persian moves and attacks
- Supply and Attrition: The Persian player determines if units are supplied. If they are not they are disbanded.
- Cilician Garrison: During the spring, summer and fall, the Persian player randomly determines how many soldiers will guard the Cilician Gates.

Then the Macedonians have their turn, and have five phases:

- Siege of Walled Cities
- Campaign
- Supply and Attrition
- Fleet Defection
- Satrap Appointment

This completes a turn. There are 26 turns in a game.

=== The Romans ===
This is also a two-player game, one player controlling Roman legions, and the other player the various forces defending against the Romans. The game has two scenarios: The Second Macedonian War of 200–197 BCE, in which Rome attacked the forces of Philip V of Macedon, attempting to claim control of Greece; and the Roman–Seleucid War of 192–188 BCE, in which Rome attempted to extend its control over Asia Minor. Both scenarios last 26 turns.

==== Gameplay ====
Each turn the Romans are active first, and have four phases:

- Siege
- Diplomacy
- Campaign (movement and combat)
- Attrition

After the Roman player finishes, the second player has the same phases. When the second player finishes, that marks the end of one game turn. Eight game turns plus a Winter Planning Turn make up one year of game time.

== Publication history ==
The Conquerors was designed by Richard Berg, with graphical design by Redmond A. Simonsen, and was published by SPI in 1977. The Macedonians and The Romans were also sold as individual games. None of the three games sold well and did not appear on SPI's Top Ten Bestselling Games list.

After the demise of SPI, Exacaibre Games acquired the rights to The Conquerors, and released it in 2011 titled Conquerors.

== Reception ==
In Issue 9 of Fire & Movement, Richard DeBaun called this "one of the most fascinating games to come from SPI in a long time." DeBaun found the components "both attractive and complete." However, he noted that the rulebook was not well-written, "a decided cut below SPI's generally accepted norm," and found the game impossible to play until he received errata from SPI. Despite these issues, DeBaun thought the game "remains worthy of more than cursory inspection in spite of its production flaws. Those with even a modest interest in ancient strategic warfare should find it an enjoyable and generally credible simulation on the subject."

In Issue 18 of the British wargaming magazine, Perfidious Albion, Geoff Barnard thought SPI had done a nice job on the maps, and "liked the touch of adding the Roman roads and their names." However, Barnard felt that "a game of this type gives great scope for disagreements" after he ran into differences of opinion about stacking and counter issues during a game. However, Barnard concluded on a positive note, saying, "Generally the effect of the game is good with smart maps and counters, well laid out charts and rules with many interesting ideas."

In Issue 13 of Phoenix, Charles Vasey found the game "is quite good fun and contains a few elements of ancient warfare." However, he found many problems with the historical accuracy of the game, and "in the final result it fails to satisfy".

In his 1977 book The Comprehensive Guide to Board Wargaming, Nick Palmer called the games "Two basically strategic simulations of Alexander's Persian campaigns and the Roman drives in the Mediterranean."

In The Guide to Simulations/Games for Education and Training, Martin Campion was enthusiastic about the possibilities of this game for classroom use, saying, "This is one of the best wargames available, although I have a few doubts about some of the details, especially about the tactical game." He concluded, "For classroom use, The Conquerors, especially the Roman versions, gives many chances for conversion to multiplayer versions."

In Issue 47 of Moves, Ben Miller pointed out the unhistorical tactics by the Macedonians in the game when using the sarissa, and suggested more historically accurate rules.

In a retrospective review in Issue 5 of Simulacrum, Brandon Einhorn called the supply rules "one of the weak points of the game. [...] Since supply was a crucial aspect of campaigning back then, I think it should have been simulated in more detail and in a better way." Einhorn concluded, "All in all the game has its strong points, does cover campaigns not covered by other games and for its time was innovative. But judging by today's standards it has not stood the test of time."

== Awards ==
At the 1978 Origins Awards, The Conquerors was a finalist for a Charles S. Roberts Award in the category "Best Strategic Game of 1977."

== Other reviews and commentary ==
- Campaign No. 88
- Fire & Movement No. 22
