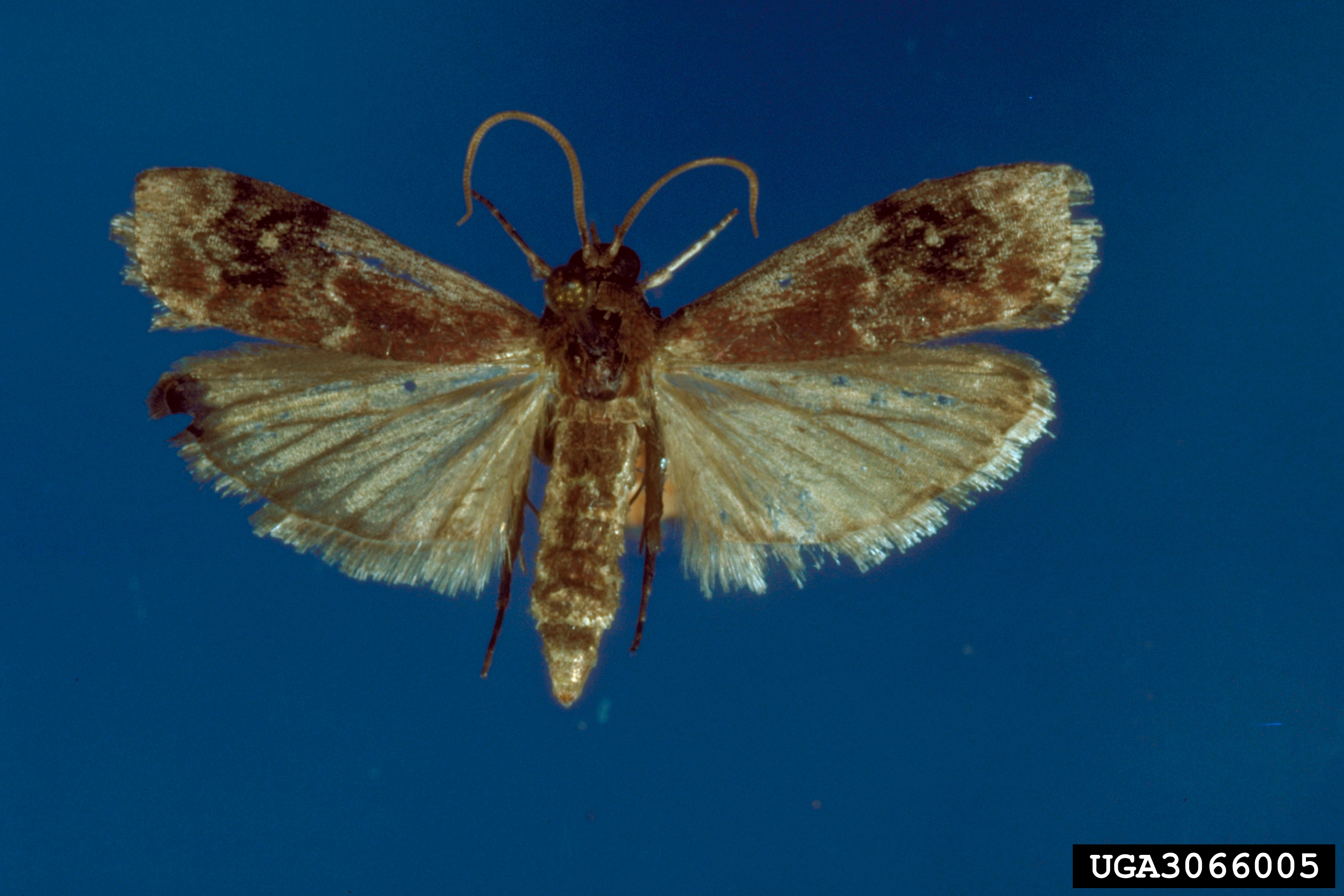

Scientific classification
- Kingdom: Animalia
- Phylum: Arthropoda
- Clade: Pancrustacea
- Class: Insecta
- Order: Lepidoptera
- Family: Pyralidae
- Genus: Euzophera
- Species: E. semifuneralis

Binomial name
- Euzophera semifuneralis (Walker, 1863)

Synonyms
- Nephopteryx semifuneralis Walker, 1863; Euzophera palludella (Hulst, 1887)

= Euzophera semifuneralis =

Species of moth

Euzophera semifuneralis, the American plum borer, is a moth of the family Pyralidae. It is found throughout the United States, southern Canada and parts of Mexico.

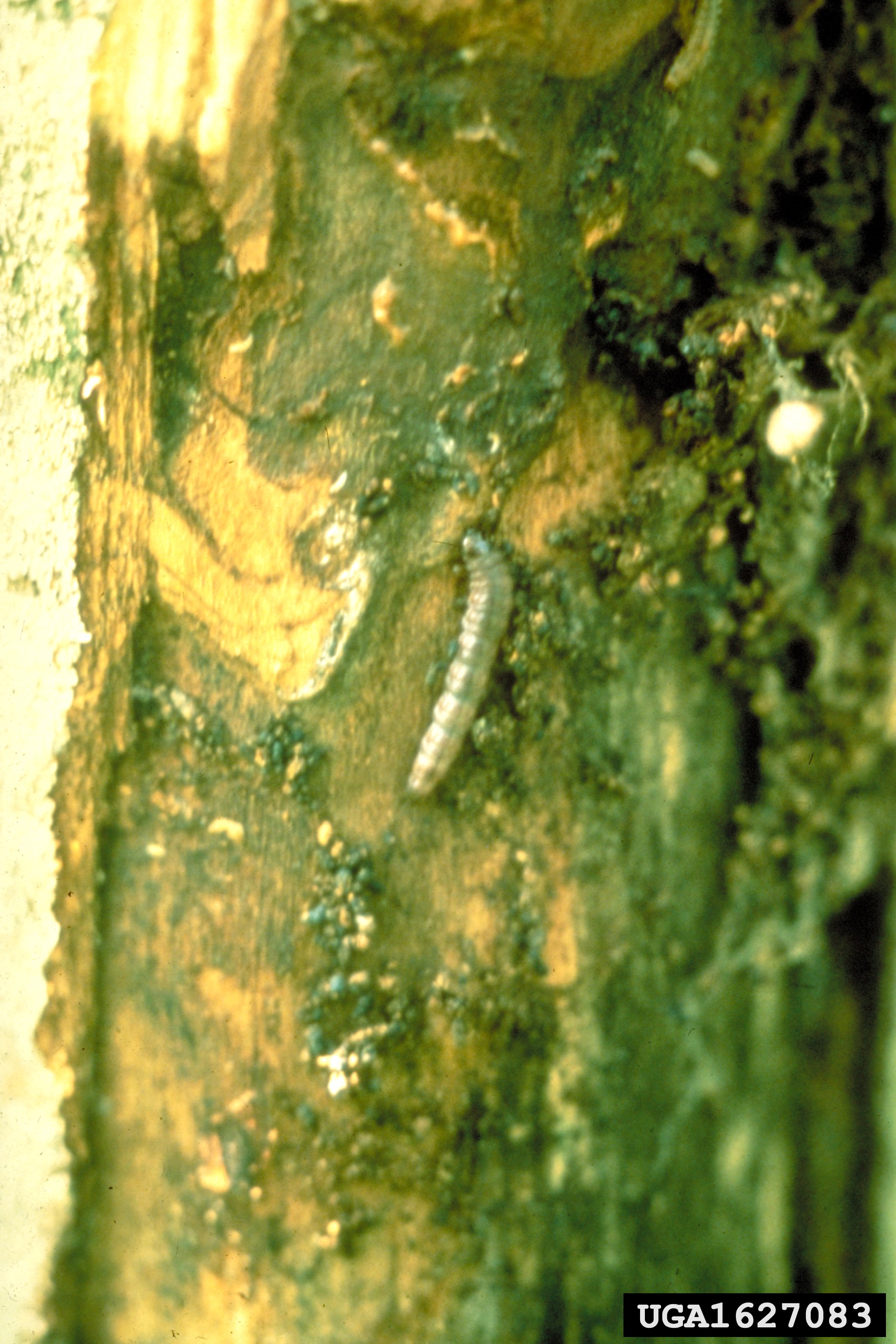

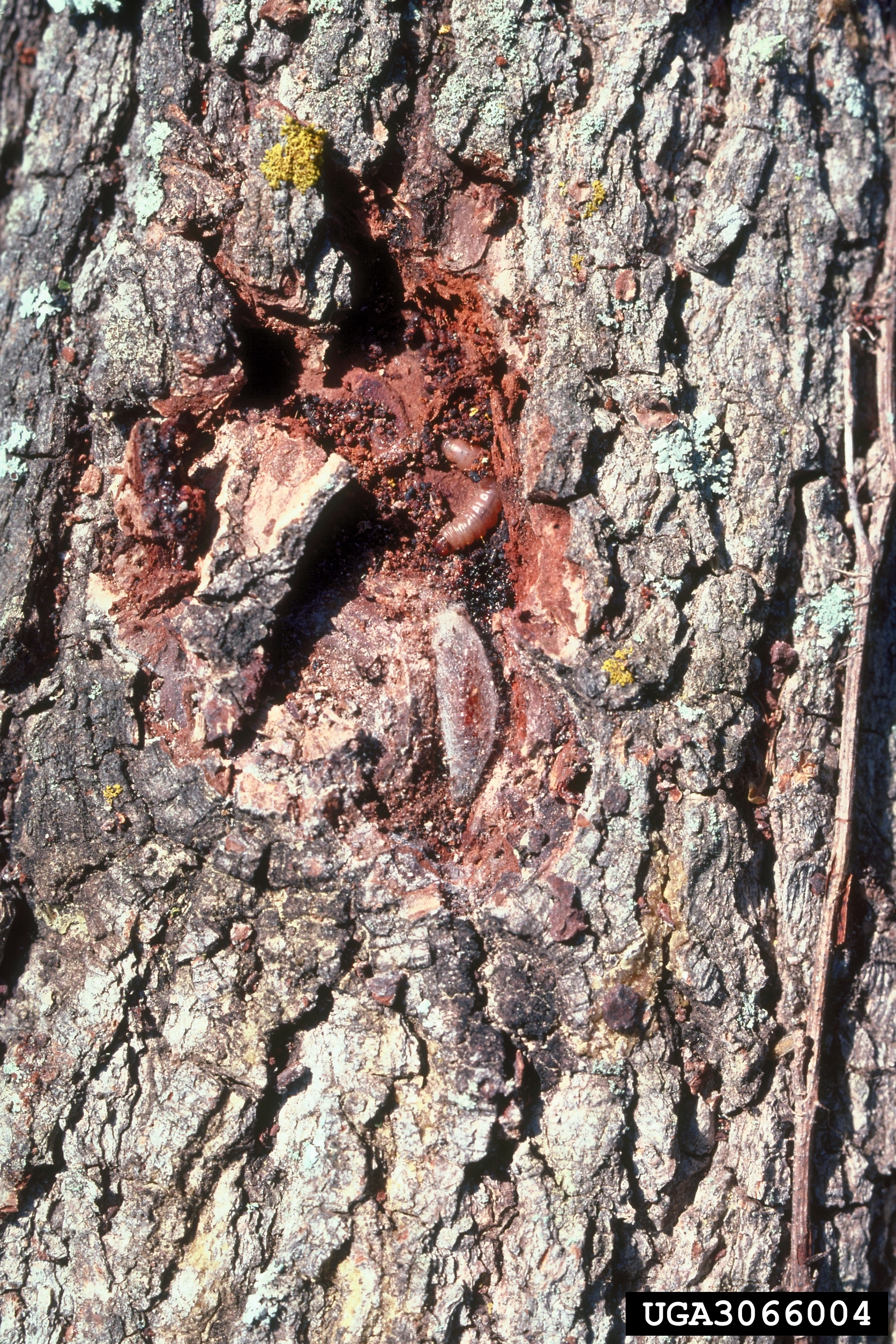

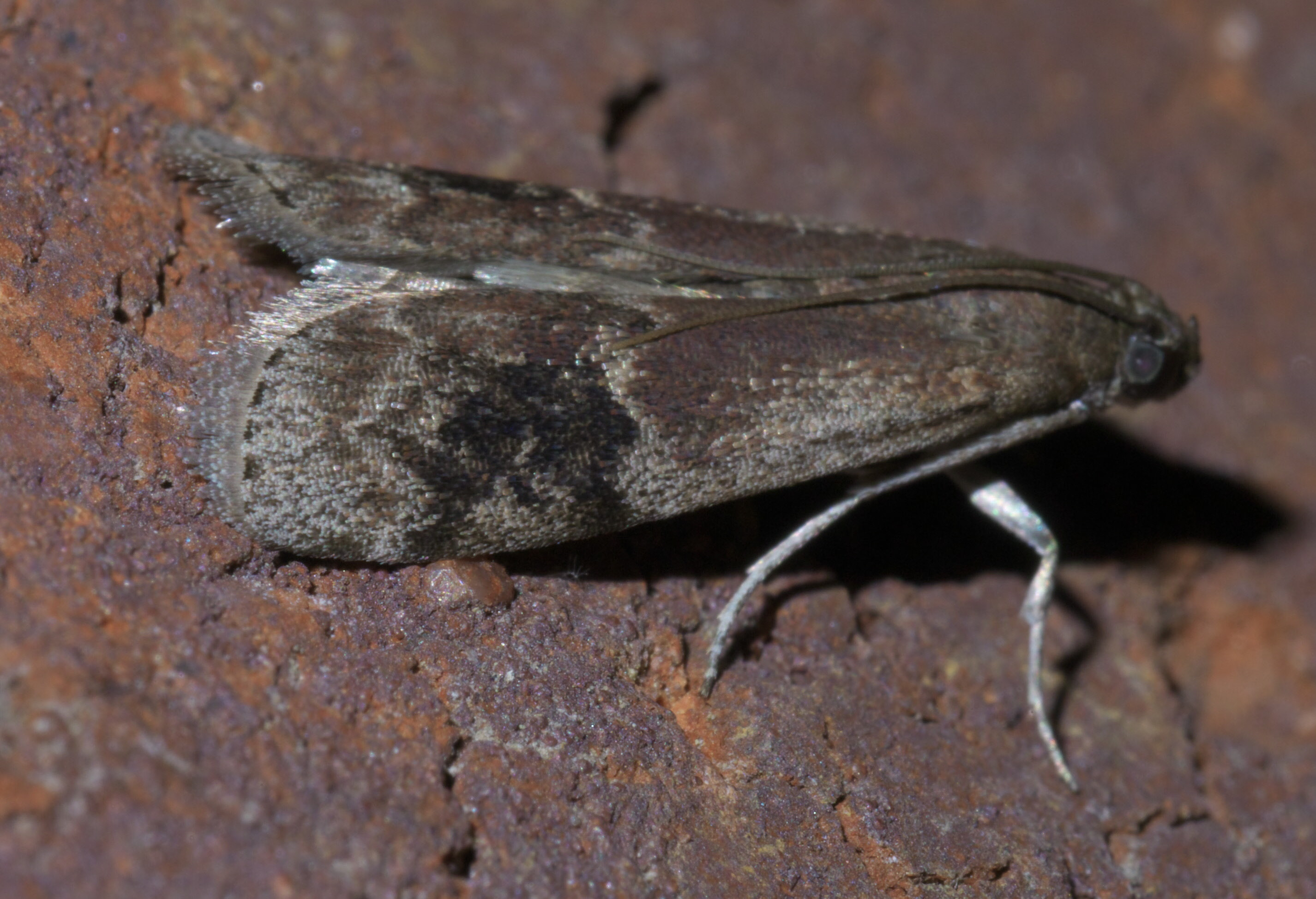
Euzophera semifuneralis, American plum borer

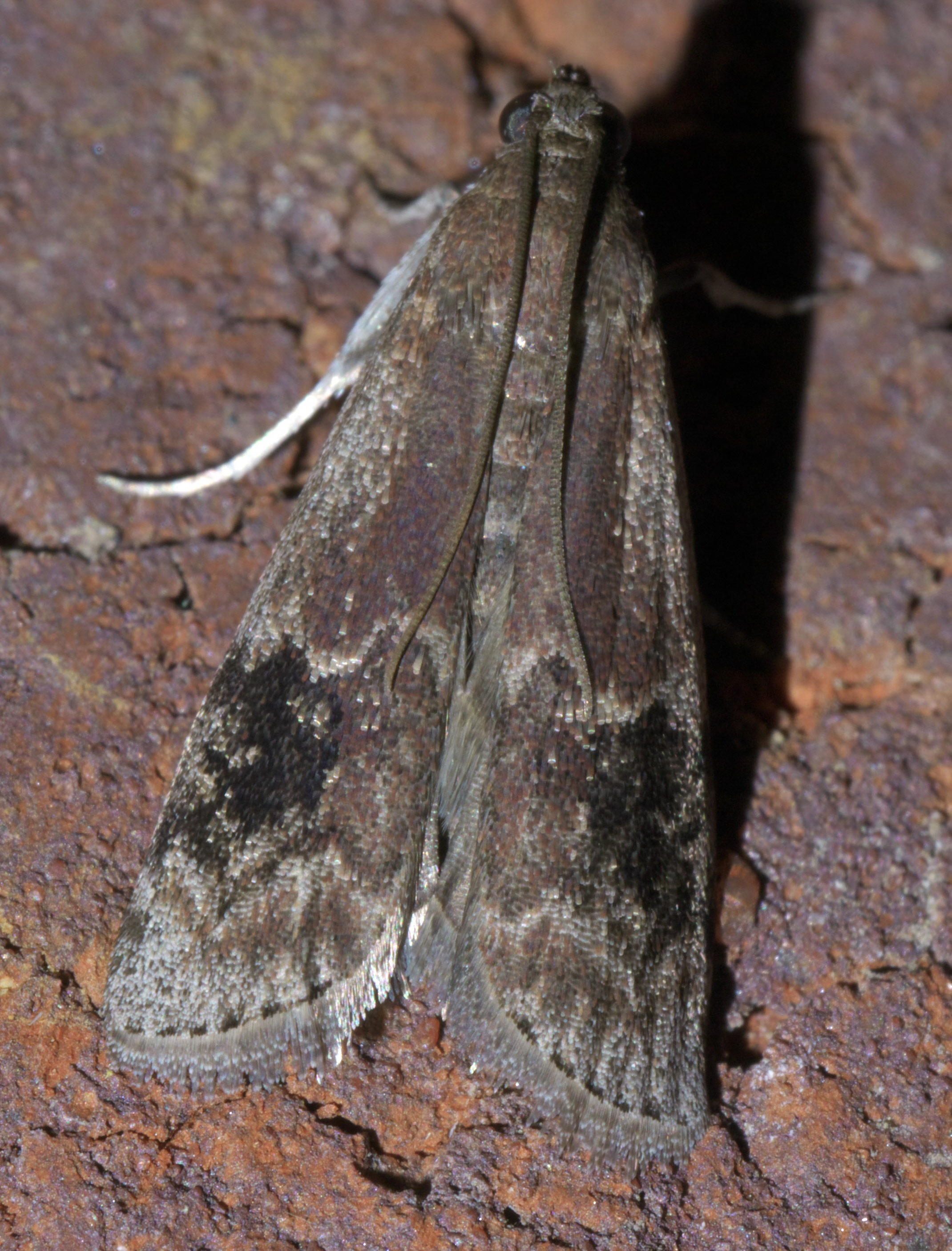
Euzophera semifuneralis, American plum borer

The wingspan is 17–28 mm.
