= List of people known as the Conqueror =

The epithet the Conqueror may refer to:

== People ==
- Ahmad Shah Durrani (1720/1722-1772), founder of the Durrani Empire.
- Afonso I of Portugal (1109–1185), King of Portugal
- James I of Aragon (1208–1276), King of Aragon
- John V, Duke of Brittany (1339–1399), Duke of Brittany, also known as Jean le Conquéreur
- Mahmud Hotak (1697–1725), Afghan Shah of Persia
- Mehmed II (1432–1481), Sultan of the Ottoman Empire
- Thutmose III (c. 1477 BC–1425 BC), Egyptian pharaoh
- Valdemar II of Denmark (1170–1241), King of Denmark
- William the Conqueror (1028–1087), Duke of Normandy and King of England

== Fictional or mythical figures ==
- Aegon the Conqueror, character in the A Song of Ice and Fire fantasy saga
- John the Conqueror, African-American folk hero
- Kang the Conqueror, Marvel Comics villain
- Chin the Conquerer, Avatar: The Last Airbender villain
