= Conqueror (paper manufacturer) =

UK paper manufacturer

Conqueror Paper
- Industry: Stationery
- Genre: Paper
- Founded: 1888
- Founder: E.P. Barlow
- Headquarters: United Kingdom
- Area served: Worldwide
- Products: Paper, envelopes
- Parent: Arjo Wiggins

Conqueror is a manufacturer of distinctive, high-quality watermarked paper in the United Kingdom. The company was founded in the late 1880s by E.P. Barlow, director of the London-based stationer Wiggins Teape.

== History ==
Barlow's idea was to provide a high-quality watermarked paper for the masses. It was intended to look like handmade paper, but to cost far less. Barlow commissioned manufacturing of the paper, but found that there were no paper mills willing to make the specified quality of paper for the low price he bargained for. Eventually, Henry Hobday, owner of the Dover-based Buckland paper mill struggling to recover from a disastrous fire, accepted the commission, and the first Conqueror paper rolled off the presses in 1888. Two years later, Wiggins Teape bought the mill. Conqueror paper was fortunate to come to market at a time when there was a large unmet demand for a paper that appeared to be handmade. Conqueror has maintained a high quality standard, which results in the brand being requested by name in shops, and the name becoming a byword for quality.

In 1990, Wiggins Teape merged with French-based Arjomari and US-based Appleton Papers, forming Arjo Wiggins. The Conqueror brand was maintained as a trademark for high-quality paper and envelopes.

The original paper mill at Buckland was shuttered in 2000 and demolished two years later, although production continues at other locations.

== Reception ==
Conqueror paper is said by the independent PrintingDirect company to be "Perhaps the best-known quality business printing paper on the market"; it is "often selected by [our] customers requiring a premium letterhead material because of its distinctive appearance".

Independent marketing company SuperbrandsDigital writes in a case study that "Since 1888, Conqueror has been recognised worldwide as a symbol of premium, quality paper for business and creative communications."

Artists often use Conqueror paper; for example, the artist Formano writes "Dance of the devil is a water color paint and its about the happiness and fate of life. Just used few colors on conqueror paper." Similarly, Tina Roth Eisenberg describes "an edition of 500 signed and numbered screenprints on conqueror paper."

Businesses print on Conqueror paper as a mark of quality; for example, Swedish boutique Artilleriet printed city guides of Paris and New York "Limited to 473 pieces and printed on 160 gram Conqueror paper, numbered and sealed, it’s maybe not the most practical or accurate guide, but definitely the most beautiful!".

== Environmental awareness ==
In 2007, Conqueror became the first fine paper company in Europe to have its range of products FSC-certified and produced carbon neutral.

In 2010, a line of FSC-certified bamboo-pulp paper is launched.

== Current production ==
Today, Conqueror paper comes in fourteen versions, and up to fifteen colours per version, up to five weights, and up to five pre-cut sizes for the watermarked line of paper. Envelopes are also available, although not as widely as the paper. Conqueror paper is distributed to over 100 countries.
