= Graf Zeppelin (march) =

German military march

"Graf Zeppelin-Marsch" is a German military march, written by military music composer Carl Teike. The name refers to Count Ferdinand von Zeppelin.

It was originally composed in 1903 under the title "March of the Teutons" (March of the Teutons). Joachim Toeche-Mittler, a German authority on the history of German military music, regarded the march as an "immortal" piece. The march was published by Carl Fischer Music in the United States under the name "The Conqueror" in 1912, arranged by Canadian composer Louis-Philippe Laurendeau. To avoid confusion, the march was often called "Graf Zeppelin (The Conqueror)" (ツェッペリン伯爵（征服者）) in CDs published in Japan. The march was especially popular in the Soviet Union. It was sometimes called "March of the Air Fleet" (Воздушный флот) in Russian. It was once used as the Swedish navy's parade march.
