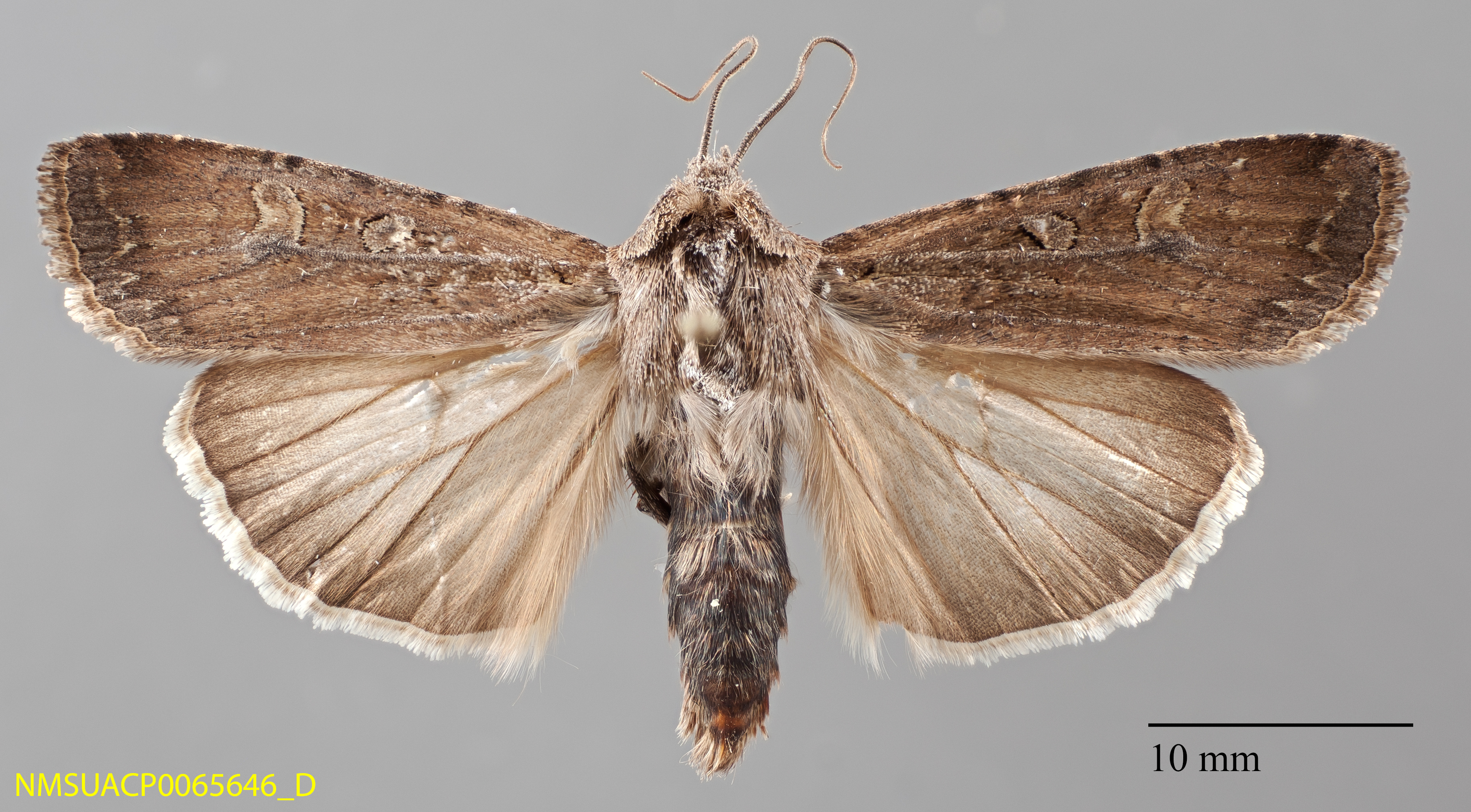

Scientific classification
- Kingdom: Animalia
- Phylum: Arthropoda
- Clade: Pancrustacea
- Class: Insecta
- Order: Lepidoptera
- Superfamily: Noctuoidea
- Family: Noctuidae
- Genus: Euxoa
- Species: E. inconcinna

Binomial name
- Euxoa inconcinna (Harvey, 1875)

= Euxoa inconcinna =

Species of moth

Euxoa inconcinna is a species of cutworm or dart moth in the family Noctuidae. It is found in North America.
