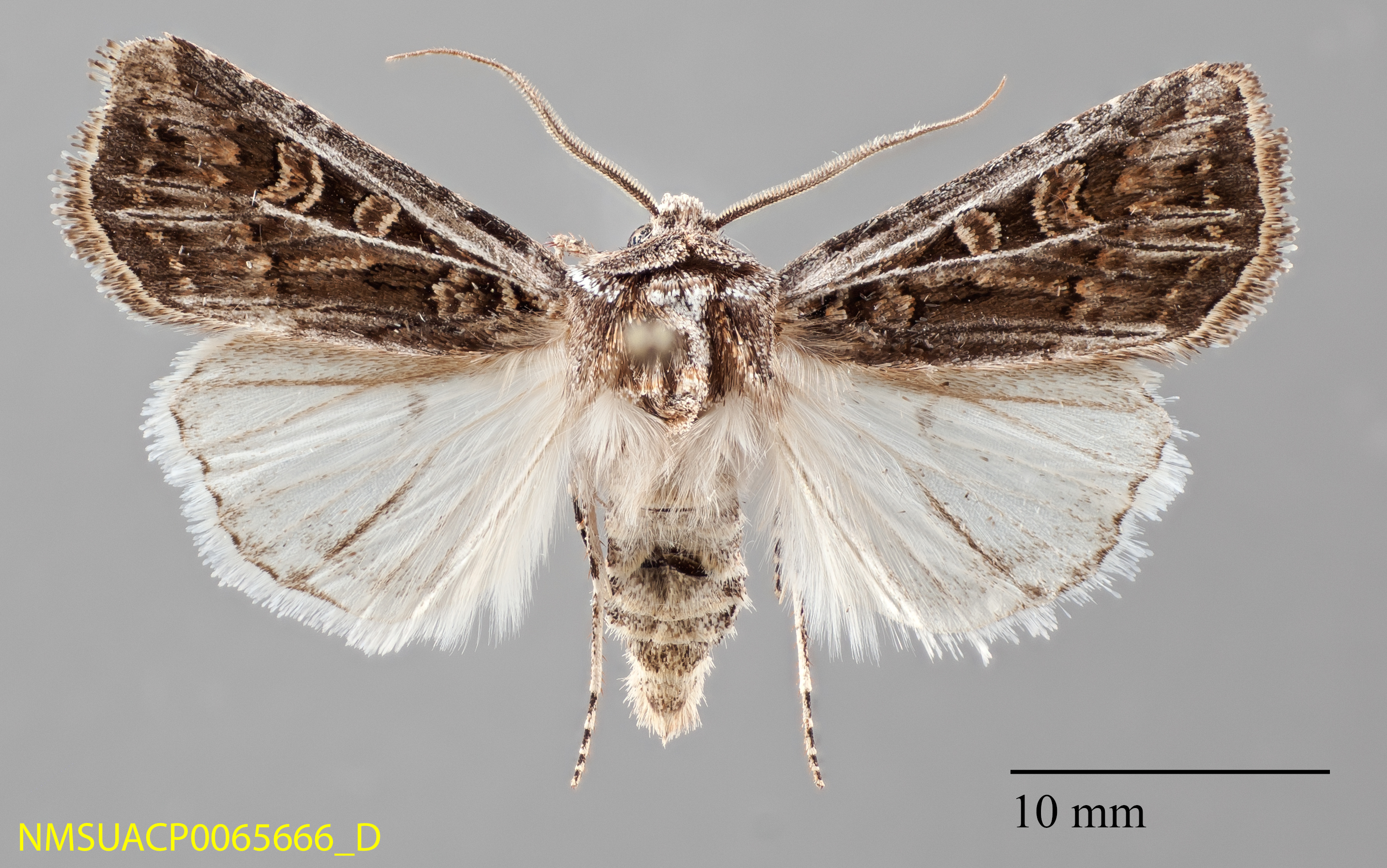

Scientific classification
- Domain: Eukaryota
- Kingdom: Animalia
- Phylum: Arthropoda
- Class: Insecta
- Order: Lepidoptera
- Superfamily: Noctuoidea
- Family: Noctuidae
- Genus: Euxoa
- Species: E. niveilinea

Binomial name
- Euxoa niveilinea (Grote, 1882)

= Euxoa niveilinea =

Species of moth

Euxoa niveilinea is a species of cutworm or dart moth in the family Noctuidae. It is found in North America.

The MONA or Hodges number for Euxoa niveilinea is 10831.
