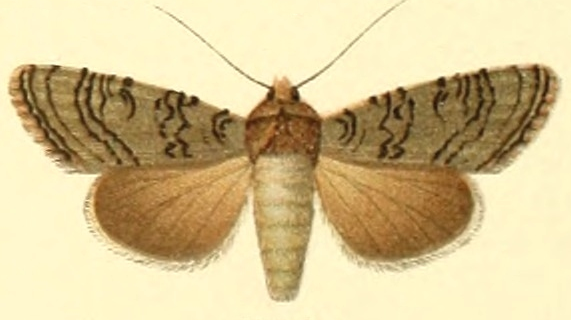

Scientific classification
- Domain: Eukaryota
- Kingdom: Animalia
- Phylum: Arthropoda
- Class: Insecta
- Order: Lepidoptera
- Superfamily: Noctuoidea
- Family: Noctuidae
- Genus: Euxoa
- Species: E. sibirica

Binomial name
- Euxoa sibirica (Boisduval, [1837])

Synonyms
- Agrotis sibirica Boisduval, [1837]; Rhyacia sibirica (Boisduval, [1837]); Agrotis lapidosa Graeser, 1892; Agrotis sepulcralis Alphéraky, 1892; Agrotis japonica Strand, 1916; Rhyacia karafutonis Matsumura, 1925; Rhyacia isshikii Matsumura, 1925; Euxoa intracta kurilintrata Bryk, 1942

= Euxoa sibirica =

Species of moth

Euxoa sibirica, the Siberian cutworm, is a moth of the family Noctuidae. It is found from western Siberia to the Amur region. It is also found on the Kuriles and in Sakhalin, Mongolia, western China, Tibet, Afghanistan, Nepal, India, the Korean Peninsula and Japan.

The length of the forewings is about 19 mm. Adults are on wing from early summer. There is one generation per year.

It is an occasional pest on crops, including crucifers, beets, corn and beans.
