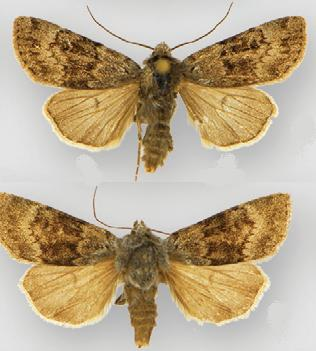
- male (top) female (bottom)

Scientific classification
- Domain: Eukaryota
- Kingdom: Animalia
- Phylum: Arthropoda
- Class: Insecta
- Order: Lepidoptera
- Superfamily: Noctuoidea
- Family: Noctuidae
- Genus: Euxoa
- Species: E. apopsis

Binomial name
- Euxoa apopsis Troubridge & Lafontaine, 2010

= Euxoa apopsis =

Species of moth

Euxoa apopsis is a moth of the family Noctuidae. It is known only from high elevations in the mountains of south-western British Columbia.

The forewing length is 14–15 mm (0.55–0.59 in).
