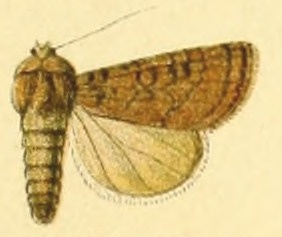

Scientific classification
- Domain: Eukaryota
- Kingdom: Animalia
- Phylum: Arthropoda
- Class: Insecta
- Order: Lepidoptera
- Superfamily: Noctuoidea
- Family: Noctuidae
- Genus: Euxoa
- Species: E. robiginosa

Binomial name
- Euxoa robiginosa (Staudinger, 1895)

= Euxoa robiginosa =

Species of moth

Euxoa robiginosa is a moth of the family Noctuidae. It is found in Turkey, Iraq, northern and south-western Iran, Lebanon, Israel and Jordan.

Adults are on wing in October. There is one generation per year.
