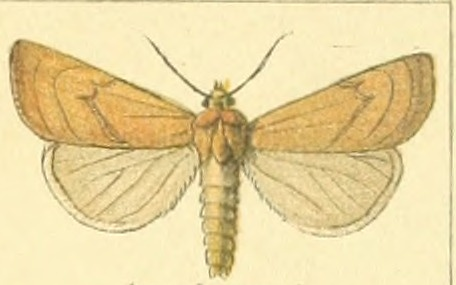

Scientific classification
- Domain: Eukaryota
- Kingdom: Animalia
- Phylum: Arthropoda
- Class: Insecta
- Order: Lepidoptera
- Superfamily: Noctuoidea
- Family: Noctuidae
- Genus: Euxoa
- Species: E. bogdanovi

Binomial name
- Euxoa bogdanovi (Erschoff, 1873)

Synonyms
- Hiptelai grumi Alphéraky, 1887; Leucania bogdanovi Erschoff, 1873

= Euxoa bogdanovi =

Species of moth

Euxoa bogdanovi is a moth of the family Noctuidae described by Nikolay Grigoryevich Erschoff in 1873. It is found in the Siberian and Mongolian steppes as well as Turkestan, where it was first discovered.
