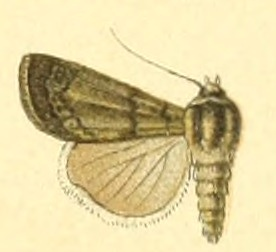

Scientific classification
- Domain: Eukaryota
- Kingdom: Animalia
- Phylum: Arthropoda
- Class: Insecta
- Order: Lepidoptera
- Superfamily: Noctuoidea
- Family: Noctuidae
- Genus: Euxoa
- Species: E. clauda

Binomial name
- Euxoa clauda Püngeler, 1906

= Euxoa clauda =

Species of moth

Euxoa clauda is a moth of the family Noctuidae. It is found in Asia, including Turkmenistan.
