= Euxoa violaris =

Scientific classification
- Domain: Eukaryota
- Kingdom: Animalia
- Phylum: Arthropoda
- Class: Insecta
- Order: Lepidoptera
- Superfamily: Noctuoidea
- Family: Noctuidae
- Genus: Euxoa
- Species: E. violaris

Binomial name
- Euxoa violaris (Grote & Robinson, 1868)

Species of moth

Euxoa violaris, the violet dart moth, is a species of moth native to North America. It is listed as a species of special concern in the US state of Connecticut. It was described by Augustus Radcliffe Grote and Coleman Townsend Robinson in 1868.
