= Euxoa guadalupensis =

Scientific classification
- Kingdom: Animalia
- Phylum: Arthropoda
- Clade: Pancrustacea
- Class: Insecta
- Order: Lepidoptera
- Superfamily: Noctuoidea
- Family: Noctuidae
- Tribe: Noctuini
- Subtribe: Agrotina
- Genus: Euxoa
- Species: E. guadalupensis

Binomial name
- Euxoa guadalupensis Lafontaine & Byers, 1982

Species of moth

Euxoa guadalupensis is a species of cutworm or dart moth in the family Noctuidae. It is found in North America.
