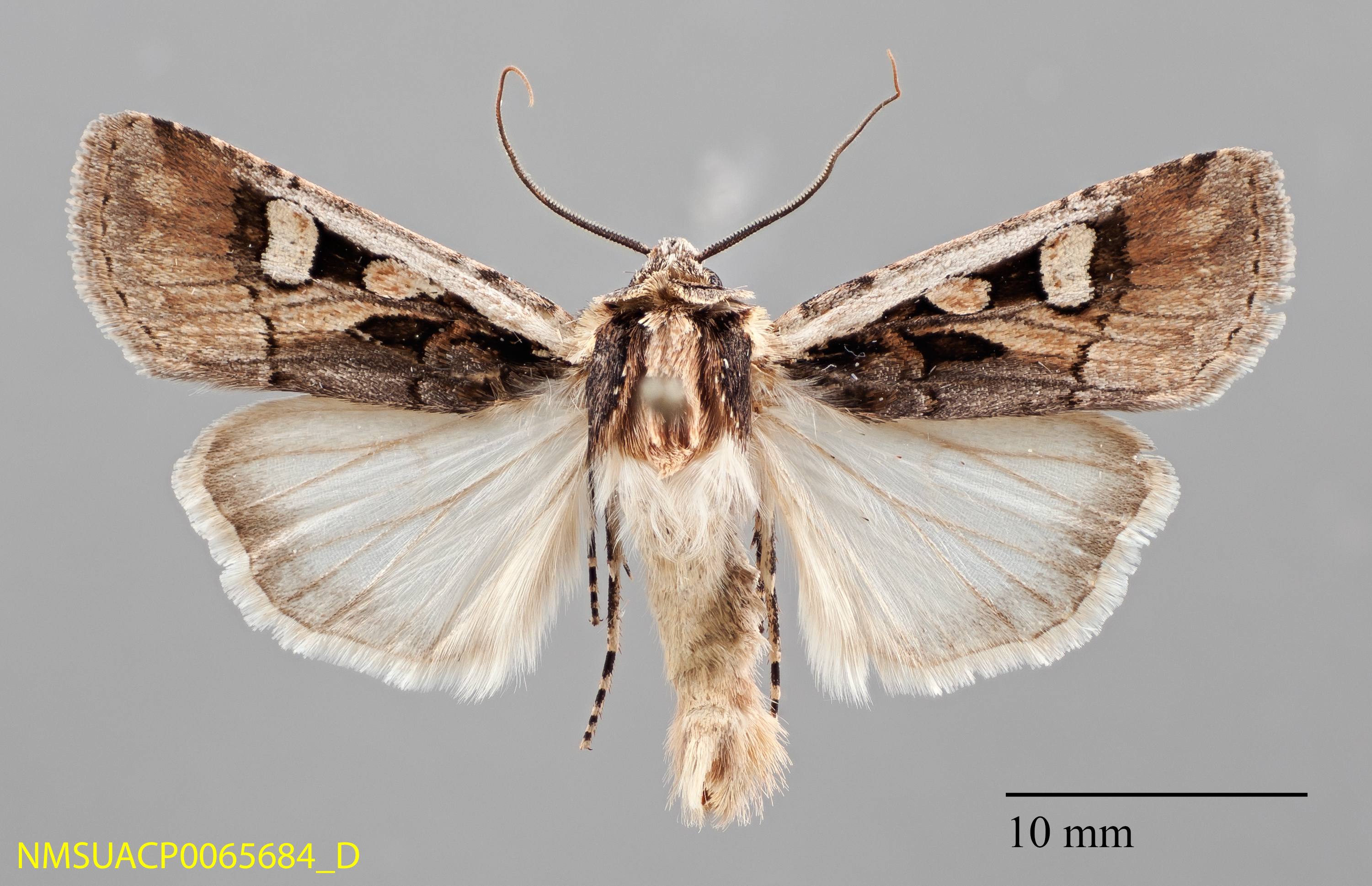

Scientific classification
- Kingdom: Animalia
- Phylum: Arthropoda
- Class: Insecta
- Order: Lepidoptera
- Superfamily: Noctuoidea
- Family: Noctuidae
- Genus: Euxoa
- Species: E. obeliscoides

Binomial name
- Euxoa obeliscoides (Guenée, 1852)

= Euxoa obeliscoides =

Species of moth

Euxoa obeliscoides, known generally as the obelisk dart or square-spot dart, is a species of cutworm or dart moth in the family Noctuidae. It is found in North America.

The MONA or Hodges number for Euxoa obeliscoides is 10817.
