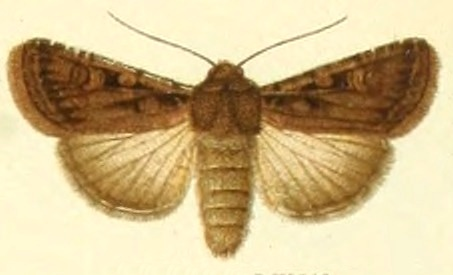

Scientific classification
- Domain: Eukaryota
- Kingdom: Animalia
- Phylum: Arthropoda
- Class: Insecta
- Order: Lepidoptera
- Superfamily: Noctuoidea
- Family: Noctuidae
- Genus: Euxoa
- Species: E. sabuletorum

Binomial name
- Euxoa sabuletorum (Boisduval, 1840)

Synonyms
- Agrotis sabuletorum Boisduval, 1840

= Euxoa sabuletorum =

Species of moth

Euxoa sabuletorum is a moth of the family Noctuidae. It is found in southern and eastern Russia.
