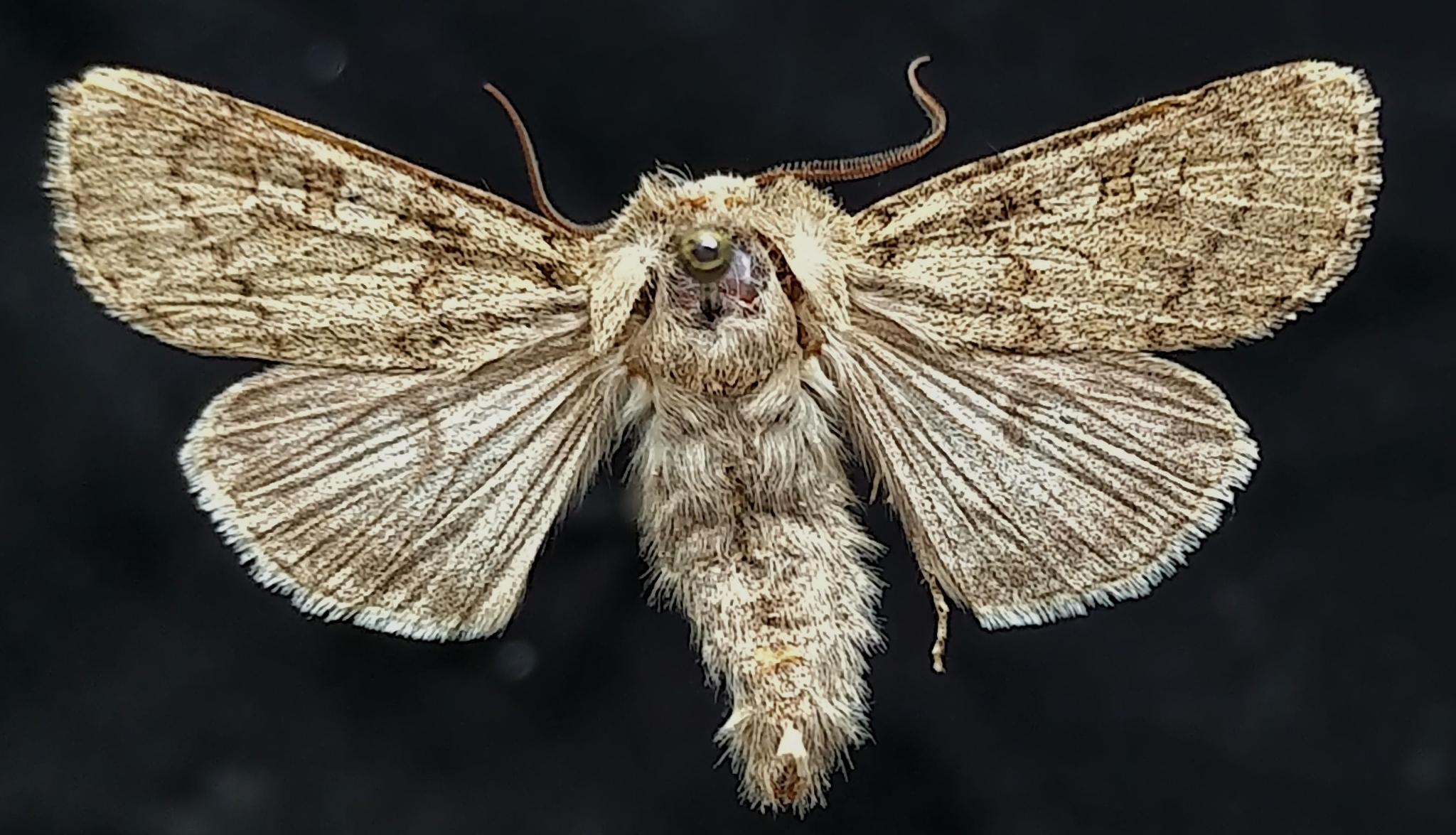

Scientific classification
- Domain: Eukaryota
- Kingdom: Animalia
- Phylum: Arthropoda
- Class: Insecta
- Order: Lepidoptera
- Superfamily: Noctuoidea
- Family: Noctuidae
- Genus: Euxoa
- Species: E. edictalis

Binomial name
- Euxoa edictalis (Smith, 1893)

Synonyms
- Carneades edictalis Smith, 1893

= Euxoa edictalis =

Species of moth

Euxoa edictalis is a species of moth in the family Noctuidae first described by Smith in 1893. It is found in North America from south central Alberta and east-central Montana, west to south-central British Columbia, south to central California, southern Nevada, central Utah and western Colorado.

The wingspan is 35–39 mm. Adults are on wing in May in Alberta. There is one generation per year.
