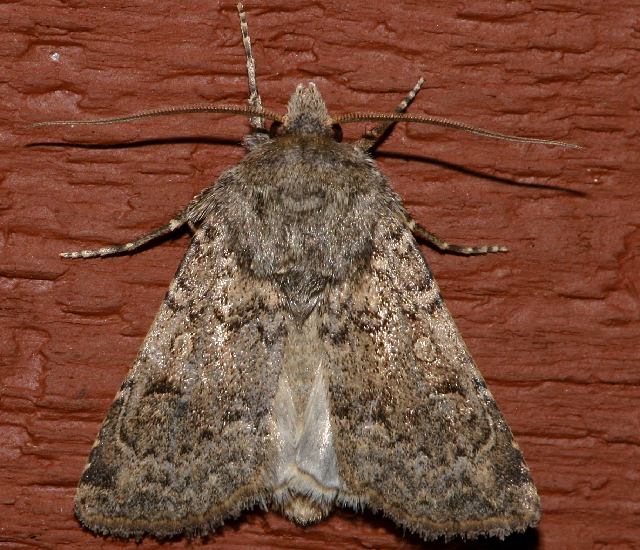

Scientific classification
- Domain: Eukaryota
- Kingdom: Animalia
- Phylum: Arthropoda
- Class: Insecta
- Order: Lepidoptera
- Superfamily: Noctuoidea
- Family: Noctuidae
- Genus: Euxoa
- Species: E. difformis

Binomial name
- Euxoa difformis (Smith, 1900)

Synonyms
- Euxoa mercedes Barnes & McDunnough, 1912

= Euxoa difformis =

Species of moth

Euxoa difformis is a species of cutworm or dart moth in the family Noctuidae. The species was first described by Smith in 1900. It is found in North America.
