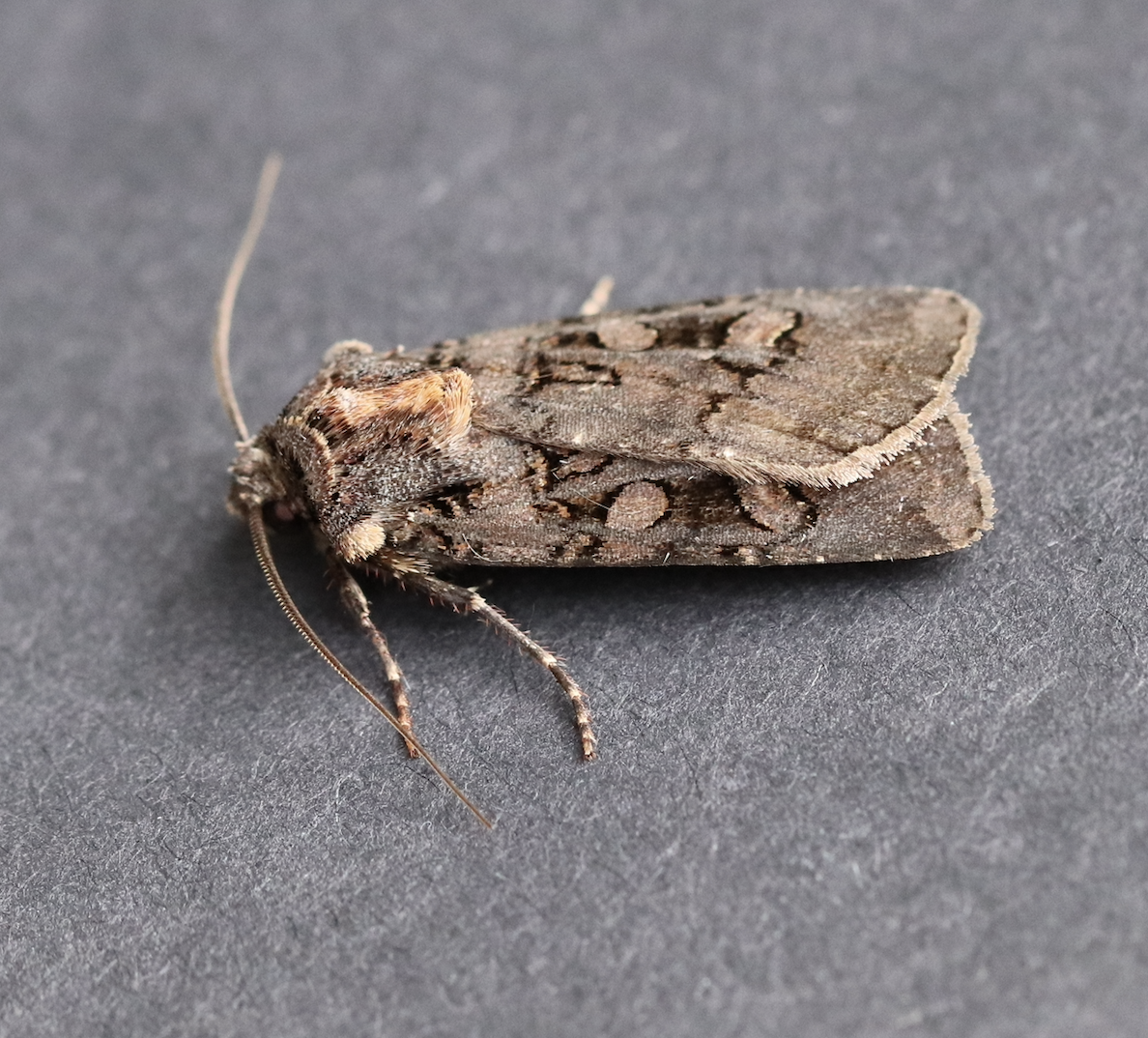

Scientific classification
- Kingdom: Animalia
- Phylum: Arthropoda
- Class: Insecta
- Order: Lepidoptera
- Superfamily: Noctuoidea
- Family: Noctuidae
- Genus: Euxoa
- Species: E. campestris

Binomial name
- Euxoa campestris (Grote, 1875)

Synonyms
- Agrotis campestris Grote, 1875

= Euxoa campestris =

Species of moth

Euxoa campestris, commonly known as the flat dart, is a species of moth in the family Noctuidae. The species was first described by Augustus Radcliffe Grote in 1875. It is found in North America from Newfoundland to Alaska, south to New England. In the west it is distributed southward in the Rocky Mountains to southern New Mexico, east-central Arizona, and central Utah. In the east it occurs in the Appalachians in eastern Kentucky and in western North Carolina.

The wingspan is 30–34 mm. Adults are on wing from July to September. There is one generation per year.
