= Euxoa biformata =

Scientific classification
- Domain: Eukaryota
- Kingdom: Animalia
- Phylum: Arthropoda
- Class: Insecta
- Order: Lepidoptera
- Superfamily: Noctuoidea
- Family: Noctuidae
- Genus: Euxoa
- Species: E. biformata

Binomial name
- Euxoa biformata Smith, 1910

Species of moth

Euxoa biformata is a moth of the family Noctuidae. It is found from British Columbia, south to California.
