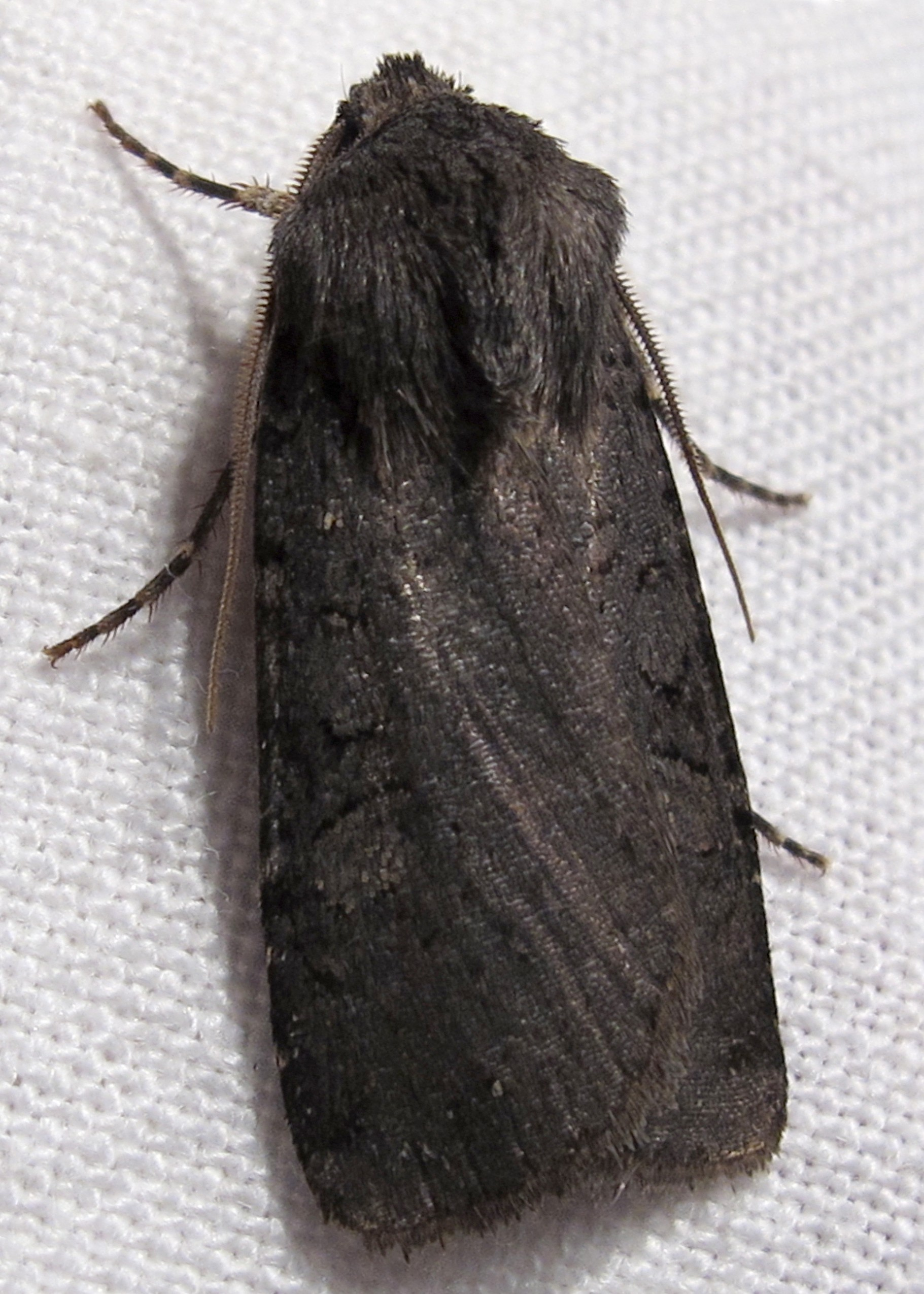

Scientific classification
- Kingdom: Animalia
- Phylum: Arthropoda
- Clade: Pancrustacea
- Class: Insecta
- Order: Lepidoptera
- Superfamily: Noctuoidea
- Family: Noctuidae
- Genus: Euxoa
- Species: E. velleripennis

Binomial name
- Euxoa velleripennis (Grote, 1874)

= Euxoa velleripennis =

Species of moth

Euxoa velleripennis, the fleece-winged dart, is a species of cutworm or dart moth in the family Noctuidae. It is found in North America.
