= Euxoa basalis =

Scientific classification
- Domain: Eukaryota
- Kingdom: Animalia
- Phylum: Arthropoda
- Class: Insecta
- Order: Lepidoptera
- Superfamily: Noctuoidea
- Family: Noctuidae
- Genus: Euxoa
- Species: E. basalis

Binomial name
- Euxoa basalis (Grote, 1879)

Synonyms
- Agrotis basalis Grote, 1879

Species of moth

Euxoa basalis is a moth of the family Noctuidae. It is found in Alberta, Saskatchewan and the Northern Territories in Canada, south to Colorado, Arizona and California. It is abundant in the Rocky Mountain region.

The wingspan is about 35mm.
