= Euxoa cinereopallidus =

Scientific classification
- Domain: Eukaryota
- Kingdom: Animalia
- Phylum: Arthropoda
- Class: Insecta
- Order: Lepidoptera
- Superfamily: Noctuoidea
- Family: Noctuidae
- Genus: Euxoa
- Species: E. cinereopallidus

Binomial name
- Euxoa cinereopallidus (Smith, 1903)

Synonyms
- Euxoa cinereopallida (Smith, 1903); Carneades cinereopallidus Smith, 1903

Species of moth

Euxoa cinereopallidus is a moth of the family Noctuidae. It is found in British Columbia, Alberta and Saskatchewan in Canada. It is also found in the United States, including Utah and Texas.

The wingspan is about 32 mm.
