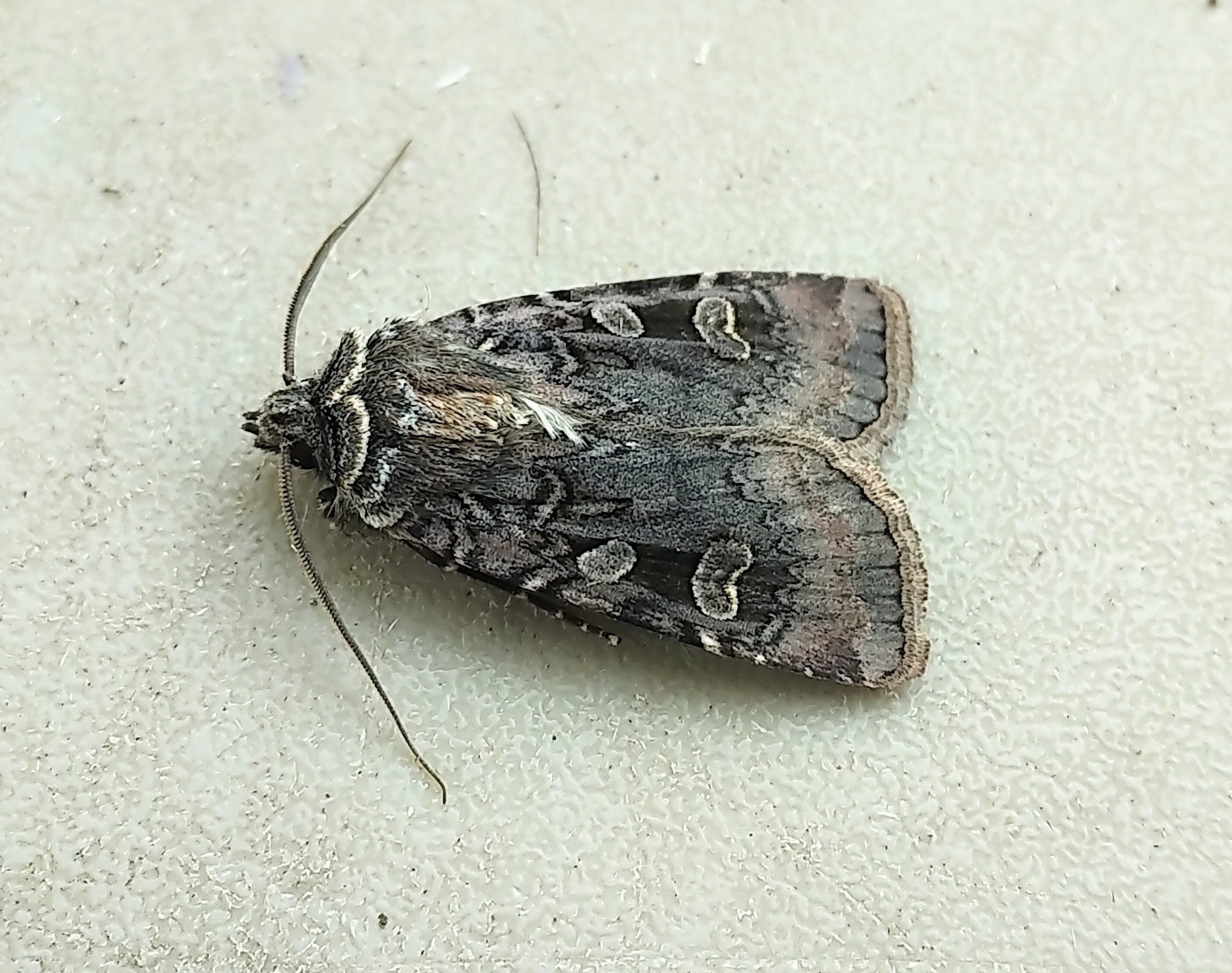

Scientific classification
- Kingdom: Animalia
- Phylum: Arthropoda
- Clade: Pancrustacea
- Class: Insecta
- Order: Lepidoptera
- Superfamily: Noctuoidea
- Family: Noctuidae
- Genus: Euxoa
- Species: E. declarata

Binomial name
- Euxoa declarata (Walker, 1865)

Synonyms
- Mamestra declarata Walker, 1865; Agrotis decolor Morrison, 1875; Agrotis spectanda Smith, 1890

= Euxoa declarata =

Species of moth

Euxoa declarata, the clear dart, is a species of moth in the family Noctuidae. The species was first described by Francis Walker in 1865. It is found in Canada in Ontario, Quebec, New Brunswick, Nova Scotia, Prince Edward Island, British Columbia, Alberta, Saskatchewan, Yukon and Manitoba. It is found as far west as central Alaska. In the United States it is also found to Minnesota and North Carolina in the east and Arizona, New Mexico and California in the west.

The wingspan is 31–37 mm. Adults are on wing from July to September. There is one generation per year.

== Subspecies ==
- Euxoa declarata declarata
- Euxoa declarata californica (California)
