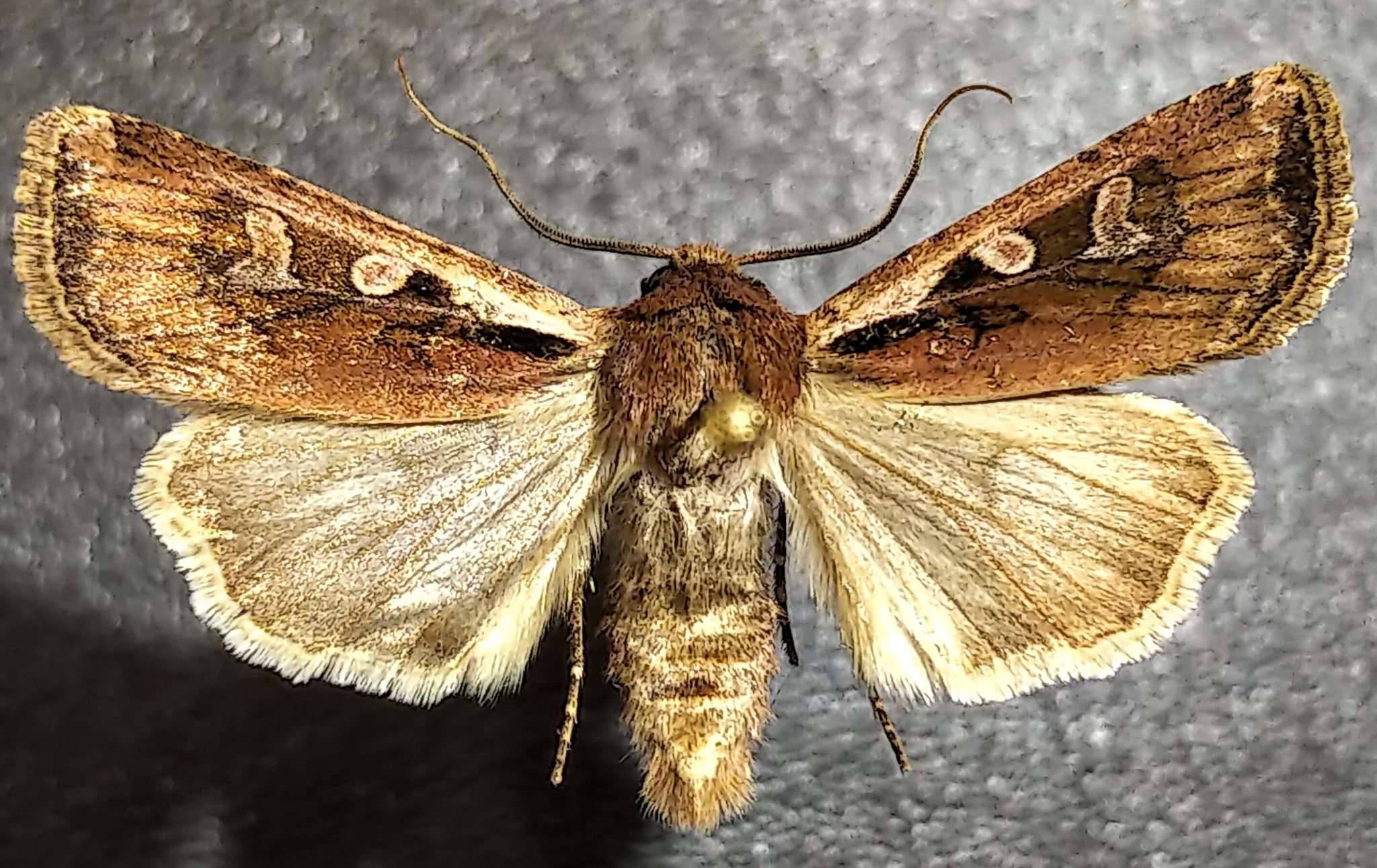

Scientific classification
- Domain: Eukaryota
- Kingdom: Animalia
- Phylum: Arthropoda
- Class: Insecta
- Order: Lepidoptera
- Superfamily: Noctuoidea
- Family: Noctuidae
- Genus: Euxoa
- Species: E. castanea

Binomial name
- Euxoa castanea Lafontaine, 1981

= Euxoa castanea =

Species of moth

Euxoa castanea is a species of moth in the family Noctuidae that was first described by J. Donald Lafontaine in 1981.

The wingspan is 35–38 mm. Adults are on wing from July to August. There is one generation per year.
