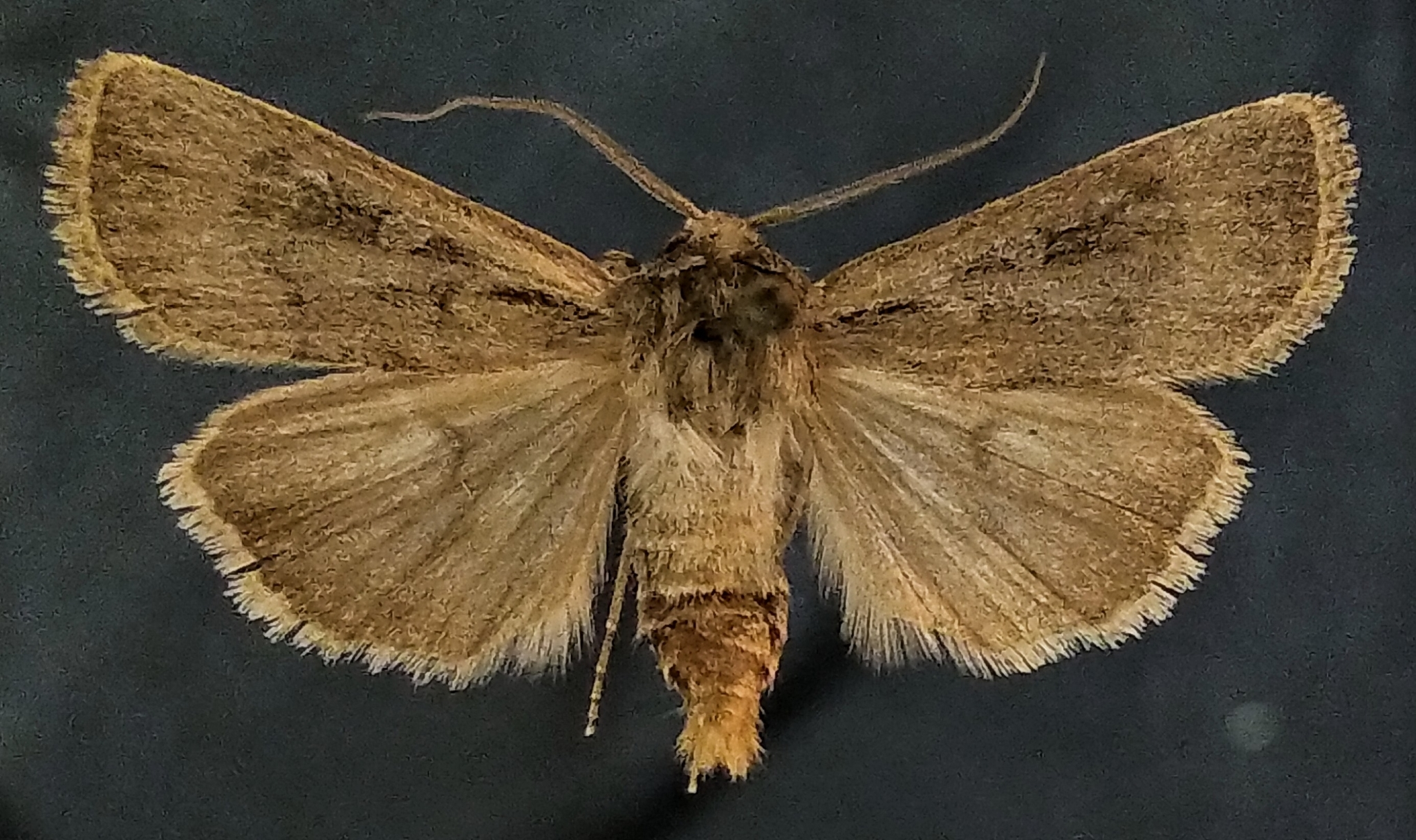

Scientific classification
- Domain: Eukaryota
- Kingdom: Animalia
- Phylum: Arthropoda
- Class: Insecta
- Order: Lepidoptera
- Superfamily: Noctuoidea
- Family: Noctuidae
- Genus: Euxoa
- Species: E. clausa

Binomial name
- Euxoa clausa McDunnough, 1923

= Euxoa clausa =

Species of moth

Euxoa clausa is a moth of the family Noctuidae first described by James Halliday McDunnough in 1923. It is known in North America mainly from the north-western Great Plains in southern Saskatchewan and Alberta, south to south-western Montana and Nebraska.

The wingspan is about 33 mm. Adults are on wing in July to August. There is one generation per year.
