= Euxoa anarmodia =

Scientific classification
- Domain: Eukaryota
- Kingdom: Animalia
- Phylum: Arthropoda
- Class: Insecta
- Order: Lepidoptera
- Superfamily: Noctuoidea
- Family: Noctuidae
- Genus: Euxoa
- Species: E. anarmodia

Binomial name
- Euxoa anarmodia (Staudinger, 1897)

Synonyms
- Noctua anarmodia Staudinger, 1897

Species of moth

Euxoa anarmodia is a moth of the family Noctuidae. It is found from Algeria to Egypt, Jordan, Israel and Lebanon.

Adults are on wing from October to December. There is one generation per year.

Larvae have been reared on Hyosyamus muticus, but the food plants in nature are unknown.
