= Euxoa cincta =

Scientific classification
- Kingdom: Animalia
- Phylum: Arthropoda
- Clade: Pancrustacea
- Class: Insecta
- Order: Lepidoptera
- Superfamily: Noctuoidea
- Family: Noctuidae
- Genus: Euxoa
- Species: E. cincta

Binomial name
- Euxoa cincta Barnes & Benjamin, 1924

Species of moth

Euxoa cincta is a species of cutworm or dart moth in the family Noctuidae that was first described by William Barnes and Foster Hendrickson Benjamin in 1924. It is found in North America.
