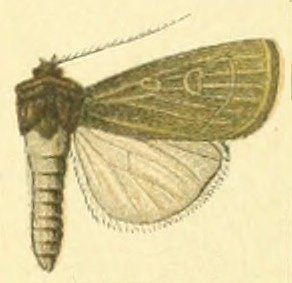

Scientific classification
- Kingdom: Animalia
- Phylum: Arthropoda
- Class: Insecta
- Order: Lepidoptera
- Superfamily: Noctuoidea
- Family: Noctuidae
- Genus: Euxoa
- Species: E. emolliens

Binomial name
- Euxoa emolliens Hampson, 1905

Synonyms
- Euxoa amplexa Corti 1931; Euxoa emolliensis (Hampson, 1905); Agrotis mollis Staudinger, 1891 (preocc. Agrotis mollis Walker, [1857])

= Euxoa emolliens =

Species of moth

Euxoa emolliens is a moth of the family Noctuidae. It is found in Ukraine and southern Russia.
