= Euxoa latro =

Scientific classification
- Domain: Eukaryota
- Kingdom: Animalia
- Phylum: Arthropoda
- Class: Insecta
- Order: Lepidoptera
- Superfamily: Noctuoidea
- Family: Noctuidae
- Genus: Euxoa
- Species: E. latro

Binomial name
- Euxoa latro (Barnes & Benjamin, 1927)

Species of moth

Euxoa latro is a species of cutworm or dart moth in the family Noctuidae first described by William Barnes and Foster Hendrickson Benjamin in 1927. It is found in North America.

The MONA or Hodges number for Euxoa latro is 10848.
