= Euxoa occidentalis =

Scientific classification
- Kingdom: Animalia
- Phylum: Arthropoda
- Clade: Pancrustacea
- Class: Insecta
- Order: Lepidoptera
- Superfamily: Noctuoidea
- Family: Noctuidae
- Genus: Euxoa
- Species: E. occidentalis

Binomial name
- Euxoa occidentalis Lafontaine & Byers, 1982

Species of moth

Euxoa occidentalis is a species of cutworm or dart moth in the family Noctuidae. It was described by J. Donald Lafontaine and J.R. Byers in 1982 and is found in North America.

The MONA or Hodges number for Euxoa occidentalis is 10781.1.
