= Euxoa silens =

Scientific classification
- Kingdom: Animalia
- Phylum: Arthropoda
- Class: Insecta
- Order: Lepidoptera
- Superfamily: Noctuoidea
- Family: Noctuidae
- Genus: Euxoa
- Species: E. silens

Binomial name
- Euxoa silens (Grote, 1875)

Species of moth

Euxoa silens, the silent dart, is a species of cutworm or dart moth in the family Noctuidae. It is found in North America.

The MONA or Hodges number for Euxoa silens is 10751.
