= Euxoa bifasciata =

Scientific classification
- Domain: Eukaryota
- Kingdom: Animalia
- Phylum: Arthropoda
- Class: Insecta
- Order: Lepidoptera
- Superfamily: Noctuoidea
- Family: Noctuidae
- Tribe: Noctuini
- Subtribe: Agrotina
- Genus: Euxoa
- Species: E. bifasciata

Binomial name
- Euxoa bifasciata (Smith, 1888)

Species of moth

Euxoa bifasciata is a species of cutworm or dart moth in the family Noctuidae. It is found in North America.

The MONA or Hodges number for Euxoa bifasciata is 10796.

== Subspecies ==
These three subspecies belong to the species Euxoa bifasciata:

- Euxoa bifasciata bifasciata
- Euxoa bifasciata bisagittifera Benjamin
- Euxoa bifasciata lowensis Benjamin
