= Euxoa leuschneri =

Scientific classification
- Kingdom: Animalia
- Phylum: Arthropoda
- Class: Insecta
- Order: Lepidoptera
- Superfamily: Noctuoidea
- Family: Noctuidae
- Tribe: Noctuini
- Subtribe: Agrotina
- Genus: Euxoa
- Species: E. leuschneri

Binomial name
- Euxoa leuschneri Lafontaine, 1987

Species of moth

Euxoa leuschneri is a species of cutworm or dart moth in the family Noctuidae. It is found in North America.

The MONA or Hodges number for Euxoa leuschneri is 10722.1.
