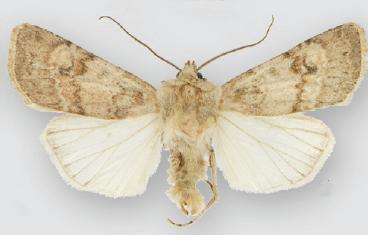
- Male

Scientific classification
- Domain: Eukaryota
- Kingdom: Animalia
- Phylum: Arthropoda
- Class: Insecta
- Order: Lepidoptera
- Superfamily: Noctuoidea
- Family: Noctuidae
- Genus: Euxoa
- Species: E. medialis

Binomial name
- Euxoa medialis Smith, 1888

Synonyms
- Agrotis medialis; Carneades kerrvillei; Euxoa poncha; Euxoa truva; Euxoa discilinea; Euxoa medialis var. rufosuffusata

= Euxoa medialis =

Species of moth

Euxoa medialis, the median-banded dart, is a moth of the family Noctuidae. The species was first described by Smith in 1888. It is found in North America from southern Manitoba and central Wisconsin, west to southwest Alberta and California; north to southern Alberta and south to south-central Mexico.

The wingspan is about 40 mm. Adults are on wing in September in Alberta.
