= Euxoa atomaris =

Scientific classification
- Domain: Eukaryota
- Kingdom: Animalia
- Phylum: Arthropoda
- Class: Insecta
- Order: Lepidoptera
- Superfamily: Noctuoidea
- Family: Noctuidae
- Genus: Euxoa
- Species: E. atomaris

Binomial name
- Euxoa atomaris (Smith, 1890)

Synonyms
- Agrotis atomaris Smith, 1890; Carneades detesta Smith, 1893; Euxoa esta Smith, 1906

Species of moth

Euxoa atomaris is a moth of the family Noctuidae first described by Smith in 1890. It is found in North America from North Dakota, southern Alberta and British Columbia, south to central New Mexico, Arizona and southern California.

The wingspan is 30–34 mm. Adults are on wing in July to September.

== Subspecies ==
- Euxoa atomaris atomaris
- Euxoa atomaris detesta
- Euxoa atomaris esta
