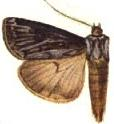

Scientific classification
- Domain: Eukaryota
- Kingdom: Animalia
- Phylum: Arthropoda
- Class: Insecta
- Order: Lepidoptera
- Superfamily: Noctuoidea
- Family: Noctuidae
- Genus: Euxoa
- Species: E. trifasciata

Binomial name
- Euxoa trifasciata (Smith, 1888)

Synonyms
- Agrotis trifasciata Smith, 1888

= Euxoa trifasciata =

Species of moth

Euxoa trifasciata is a moth of the family Noctuidae. It is found in North America, including Oregon, Washington, Colorado, and California.
