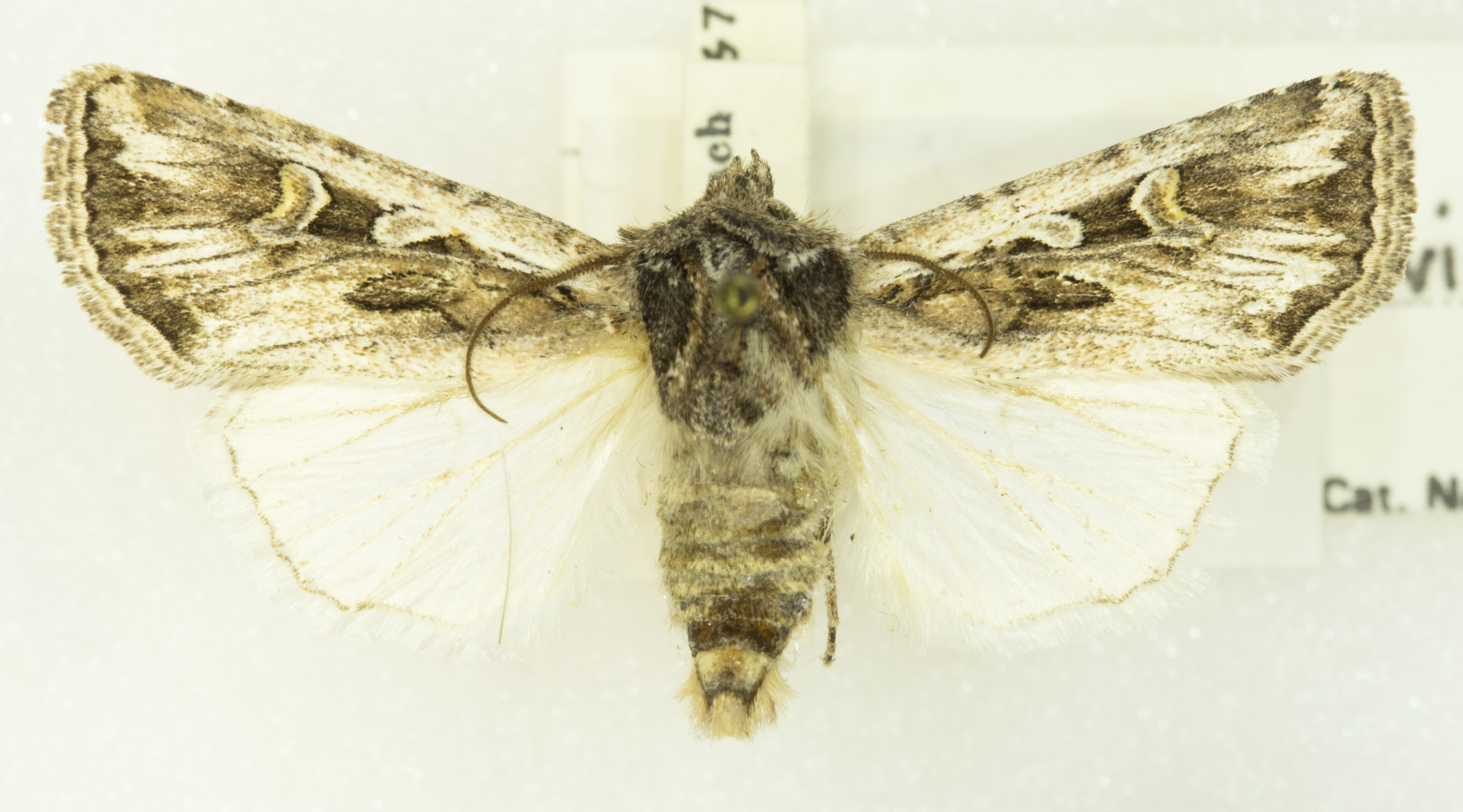

Scientific classification
- Domain: Eukaryota
- Kingdom: Animalia
- Phylum: Arthropoda
- Class: Insecta
- Order: Lepidoptera
- Superfamily: Noctuoidea
- Family: Noctuidae
- Genus: Euxoa
- Species: E. brevipennis

Binomial name
- Euxoa brevipennis (Smith, 1888)

Synonyms
- Agrotis brevipennis Smith, 1888; Euxoa brevistriga Smith, 1910; Euxoa angulirena Smith, 1910

= Euxoa brevipennis =

Species of moth

Euxoa brevipennis is a moth of the family Noctuidae first described by Smith in 1888. In Canada, it is found in British Columbia, Alberta and Saskatchewan. In the United States, it has been recorded from Utah, Colorado and California.

The wingspan of the moth is about 33 mm.
