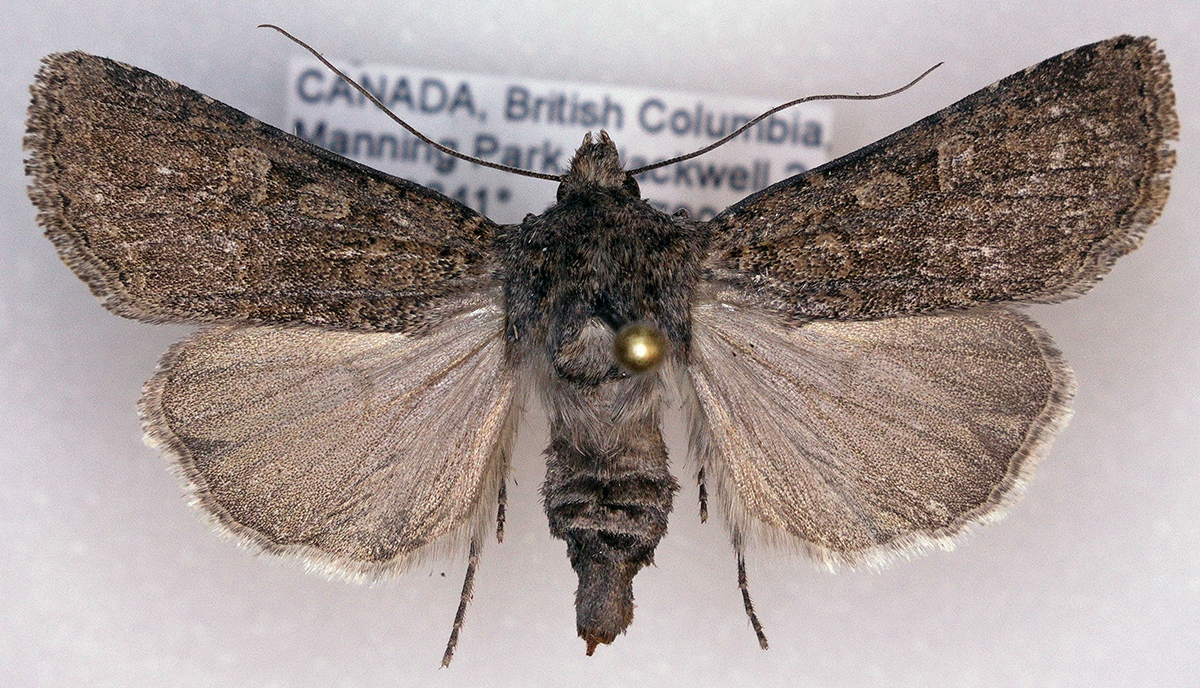

Scientific classification
- Domain: Eukaryota
- Kingdom: Animalia
- Phylum: Arthropoda
- Class: Insecta
- Order: Lepidoptera
- Superfamily: Noctuoidea
- Family: Noctuidae
- Genus: Euxoa
- Species: E. altens

Binomial name
- Euxoa altens McDunnough, 1946

= Euxoa altens =

Species of moth

Euxoa altens is a species of moth in the family Noctuidae. It is found from British Columbia, south to Oregon and California.
