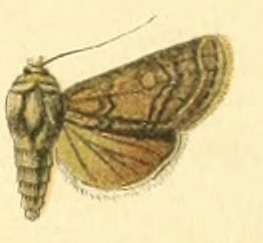

Scientific classification
- Domain: Eukaryota
- Kingdom: Animalia
- Phylum: Arthropoda
- Class: Insecta
- Order: Lepidoptera
- Superfamily: Noctuoidea
- Family: Noctuidae
- Genus: Euxoa
- Species: E. cognita

Binomial name
- Euxoa cognita (Staudinger, 1881)

Synonyms
- Agrotis cognita Staudinger, 1881

= Euxoa cognita =

Species of moth

Euxoa cognita is a moth of the family Noctuidae. It is found in central Asia, including western Turkestan.
