= Euxoa oranaria =

Scientific classification
- Domain: Eukaryota
- Kingdom: Animalia
- Phylum: Arthropoda
- Class: Insecta
- Order: Lepidoptera
- Superfamily: Noctuoidea
- Family: Noctuidae
- Genus: Euxoa
- Species: E. oranaria

Binomial name
- Euxoa oranaria (Bang-Haas, 1906)

Synonyms
- Agrotis oranaria A. Bang-Haas, 1906; Euxoa psimmythiosa Boursin, 1958

Species of moth

Euxoa oranaria is a moth of the family Noctuidae. It is found in Morocco, Saudi Arabia, Jordan, Israel and Syria.

Adults are on wing in November. There is one generation per year.
