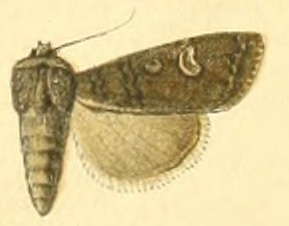

Scientific classification
- Kingdom: Animalia
- Phylum: Arthropoda
- Class: Insecta
- Order: Lepidoptera
- Superfamily: Noctuoidea
- Family: Noctuidae
- Genus: Euxoa
- Species: E. nyctopis

Binomial name
- Euxoa nyctopis Hampson, 1903

= Euxoa nyctopis =

Species of moth

Euxoa nyctopis is a moth of the family Noctuidae. It is found in north-western India.
