= Euxoa cinchonina =

Scientific classification
- Kingdom: Animalia
- Phylum: Arthropoda
- Class: Insecta
- Order: Lepidoptera
- Superfamily: Noctuoidea
- Family: Noctuidae
- Genus: Euxoa
- Species: E. cinchonina

Binomial name
- Euxoa cinchonina (Guenée, 1852)

Synonyms
- Agrotis cinchonina Guenée, 1852

Species of moth

Euxoa cinchonina is a moth of the family Noctuidae. It is found in Ethiopia.
