= Euxoa bicollaris =

Scientific classification
- Kingdom: Animalia
- Phylum: Arthropoda
- Class: Insecta
- Order: Lepidoptera
- Superfamily: Noctuoidea
- Family: Noctuidae
- Genus: Euxoa
- Species: E. bicollaris

Binomial name
- Euxoa bicollaris (Grote, 1878)

Synonyms
- Agrotis bicollaris Grote, 1878; Agrotis abnormis Smith, 1890

Species of moth

Euxoa bicollaris is a moth of the family Noctuidae. It is found predominantly in California, though its full range extends northward to the southern edge of British Columbia.

The wingspan is about 32 mm.
