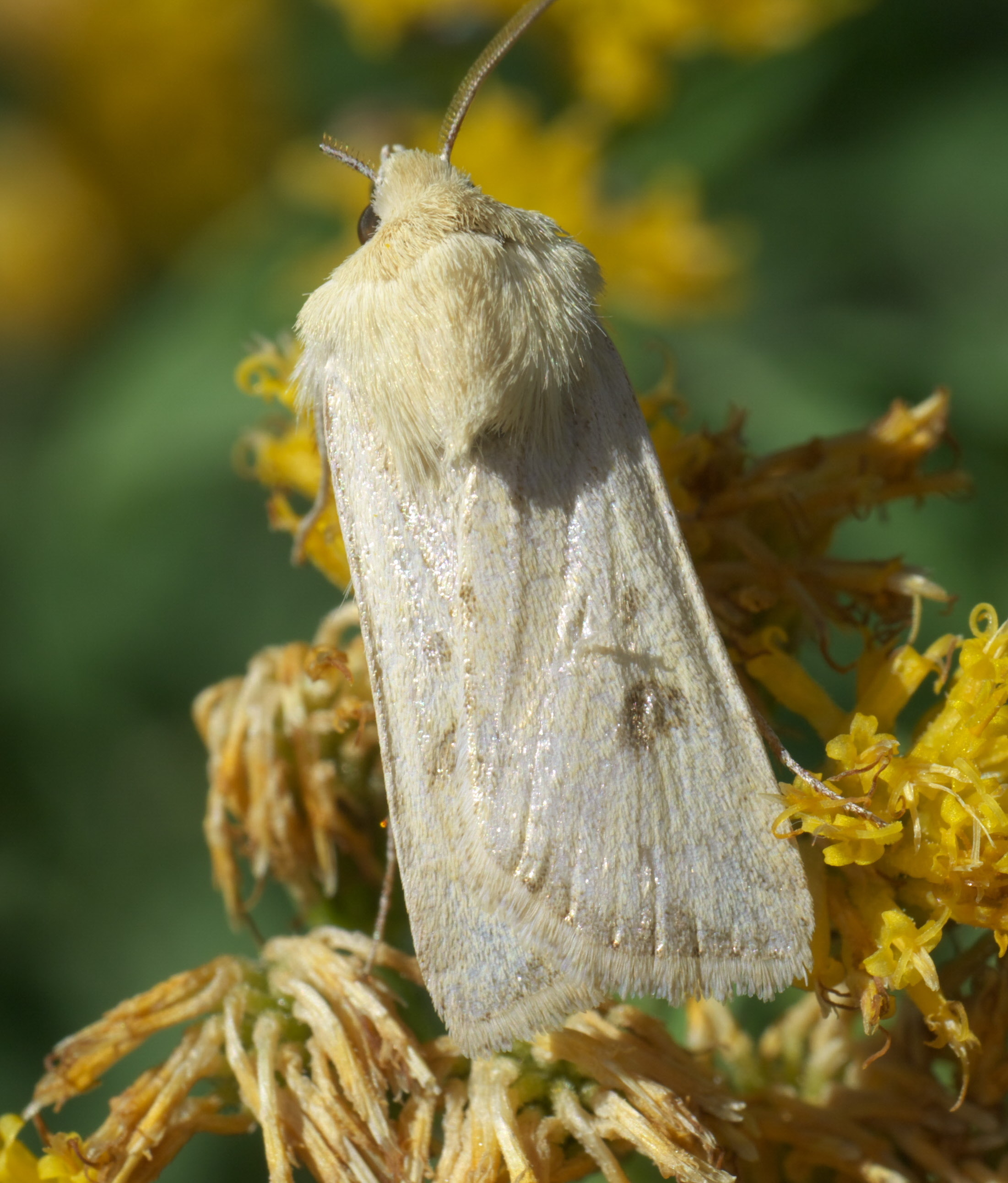

Scientific classification
- Domain: Eukaryota
- Kingdom: Animalia
- Phylum: Arthropoda
- Class: Insecta
- Order: Lepidoptera
- Superfamily: Noctuoidea
- Family: Noctuidae
- Genus: Euxoa
- Species: E. citricolor

Binomial name
- Euxoa citricolor (Grote, 1880)

Synonyms
- Agrotis citricolor Grote, 1880; Euxoa postmedialis Draudt, 1924

= Euxoa citricolor =

Species of moth

Euxoa citricolor is a moth of the family Noctuidae first described by Augustus Radcliffe Grote in 1880. It is found in North America from eastern South Dakota and western North Dakota, northwest to southern Alberta, west to western Washington and south and east to southern California, New Mexico and Colorado.

The wingspan is 34–37 mm. Adults are on wing in August to September. There is one generation per year.
