= Euxoa tibetana =

Scientific classification
- Domain: Eukaryota
- Kingdom: Animalia
- Phylum: Arthropoda
- Class: Insecta
- Order: Lepidoptera
- Superfamily: Noctuoidea
- Family: Noctuidae
- Genus: Euxoa
- Species: E. tibetana

Binomial name
- Euxoa tibetana (Moore 1878)

Synonyms
- Agrotis tibetana Moore, 1878; Agrotis modesta Moore, 1881; Agrotis monticola Hampson, 1894

Species of moth

Euxoa tibetana is a moth of the family Noctuidae. It is found from the western and southern parts of the Himalaya through the Karakoram to the western border of the Pamir Mountains.
