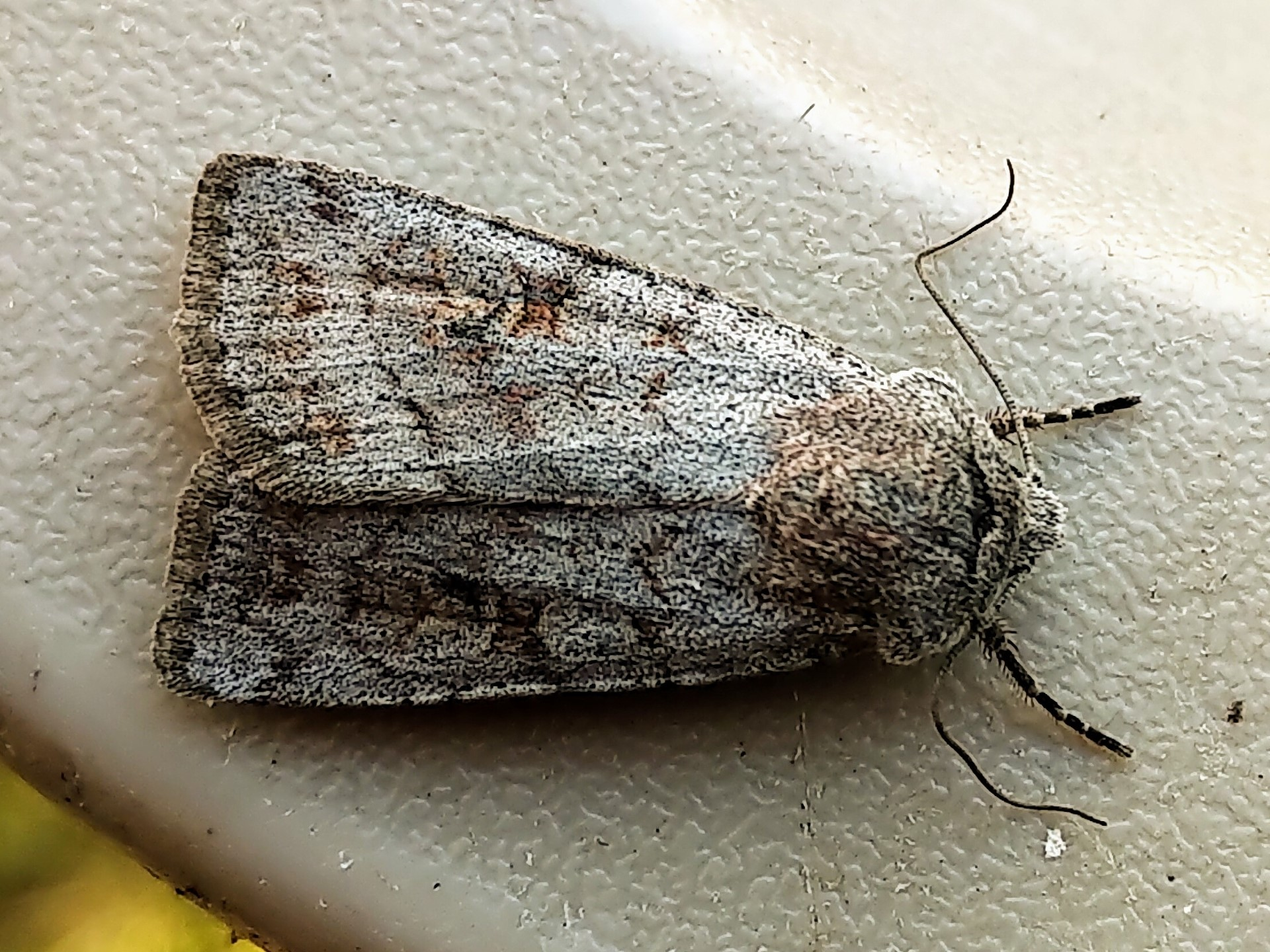

Scientific classification
- Kingdom: Animalia
- Phylum: Arthropoda
- Class: Insecta
- Order: Lepidoptera
- Superfamily: Noctuoidea
- Family: Noctuidae
- Genus: Euxoa
- Species: E. munis

Binomial name
- Euxoa munis (Grote, 1879)

= Euxoa munis =

Species of moth

Euxoa munis is a species of cutworm or dart moth in the family Noctuidae. It is found in North America.
