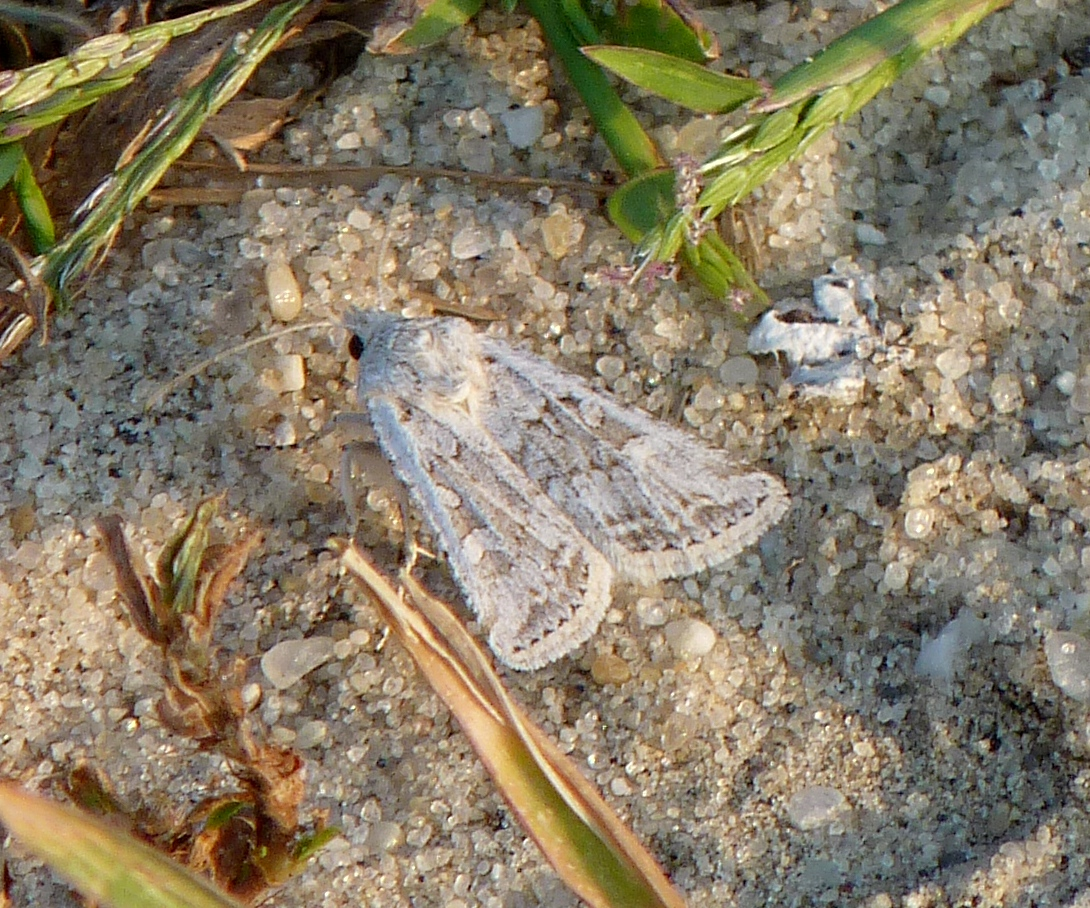

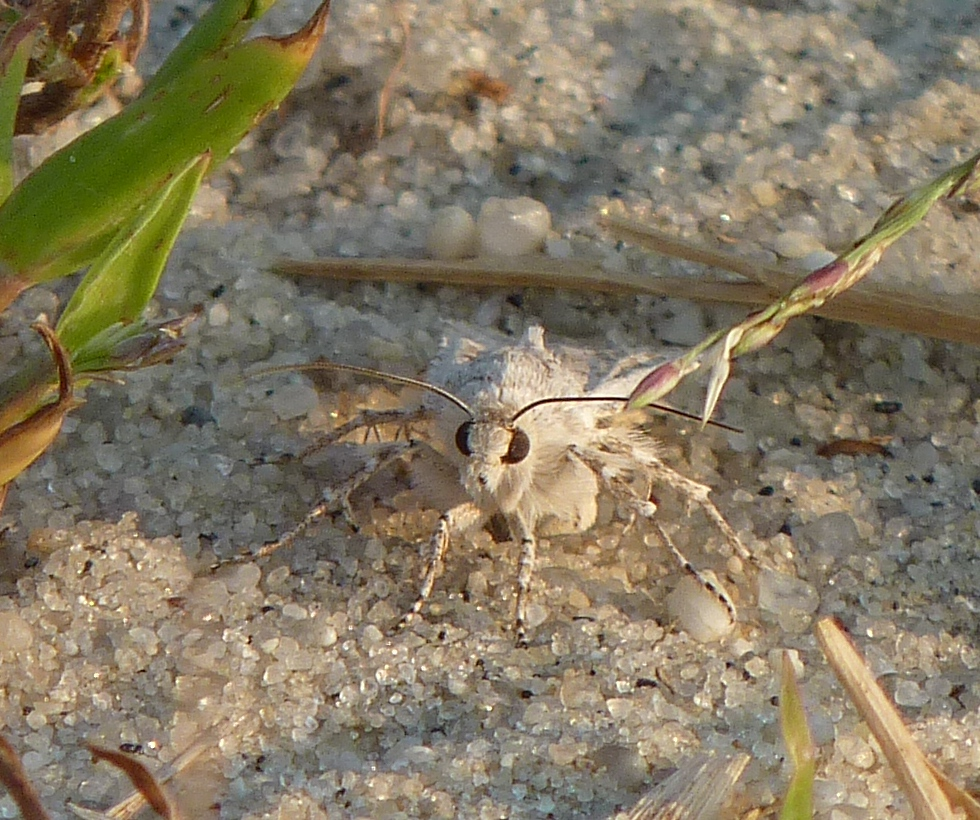

Scientific classification
- Kingdom: Animalia
- Phylum: Arthropoda
- Class: Insecta
- Order: Lepidoptera
- Superfamily: Noctuoidea
- Family: Noctuidae
- Genus: Euxoa
- Species: E. detersa

Binomial name
- Euxoa detersa (Walker, 1856)

Synonyms
- Charaeas detersa Walker, 1856; Agrotis pitychrous Grote, 1873; Agrotis personata Morrison, 1876

= Euxoa detersa =

Species of moth

Euxoa detersa, the rubbed dart, sandhill cutworm or sand cutworm, is a moth of the family Noctuidae. The species was first described by Francis Walker in 1856. It is found in North America from Newfoundland to North Carolina, west to Nebraska, north to Alberta and the Northwest Territories.

The wingspan is 30–35 mm. Adults are on wing from July to October. There is one generation per year.

The larvae feed on corn, various grasses, cranberry, saltwort, sea-rocket, various garden crops and commercial grains.

The larvae construct burrows to feed on underground portions of host plants. They are considered very destructive in fields planted in sandy soils.

== Subspecies ==
- Euxoa detersa detersa
- Euxoa detersa personata (Illinois)
