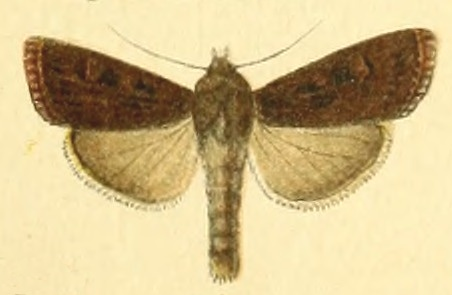

Scientific classification
- Kingdom: Animalia
- Phylum: Arthropoda
- Clade: Pancrustacea
- Class: Insecta
- Order: Lepidoptera
- Superfamily: Noctuoidea
- Family: Noctuidae
- Genus: Euxoa
- Species: E. enixa

Binomial name
- Euxoa enixa (Püngeler, 1906)

Synonyms
- Euxoa latebrosa Corti, 1931; Agrotis enixa Püngeler, 1906

= Euxoa enixa =

Species of moth

Euxoa enixa is a moth of the family Noctuidae. It is found in the western Tien-Shan mountains, Fergana, Togus-Torau, Issyk-Kul, the Alexander Mountains and Aschabad.

== significance ==
the Euixa enixa is believed to be a good luck charm by some the origins of this belief is not known as of yet
