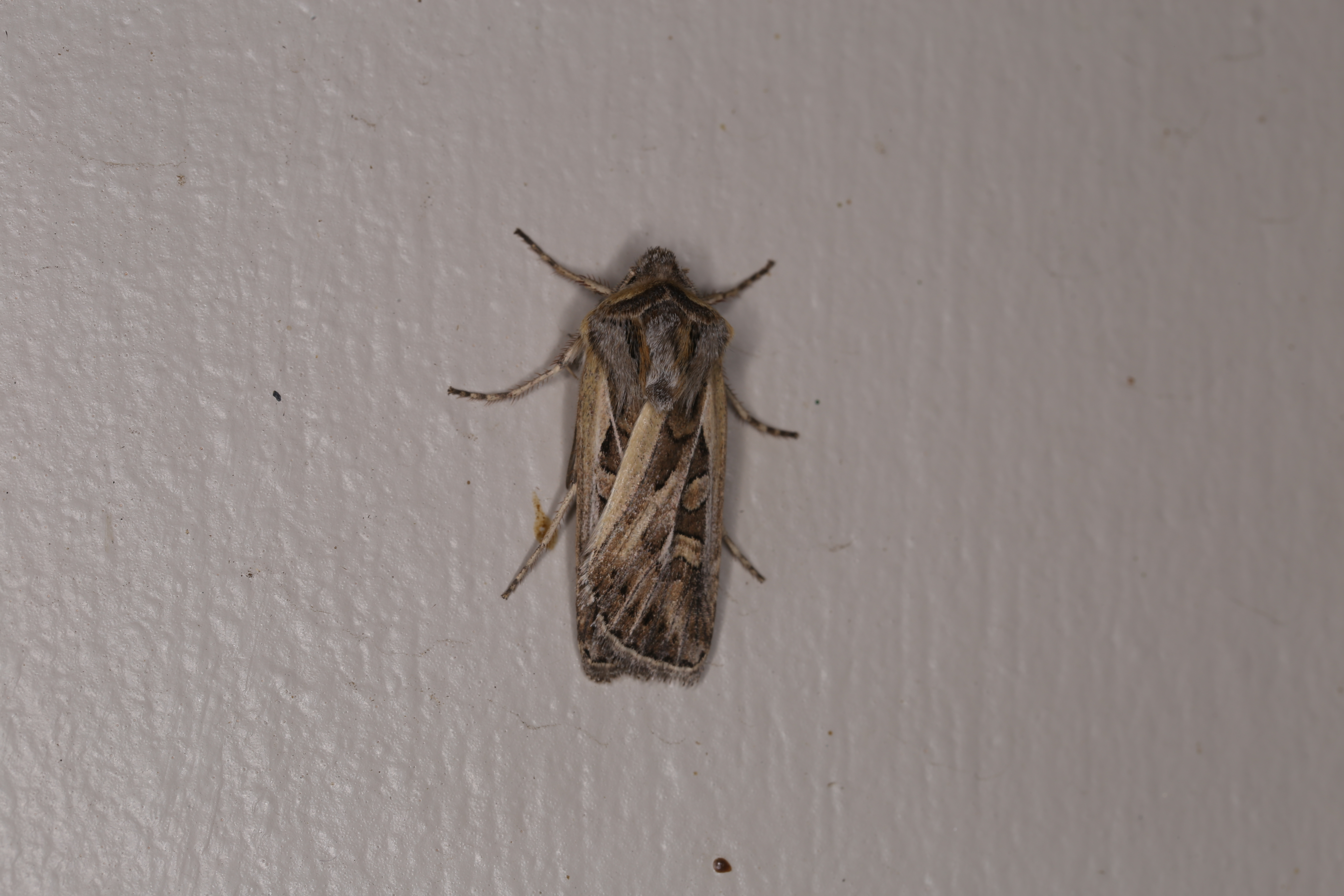

Scientific classification
- Domain: Eukaryota
- Kingdom: Animalia
- Phylum: Arthropoda
- Class: Insecta
- Order: Lepidoptera
- Superfamily: Noctuoidea
- Family: Noctuidae
- Genus: Euxoa
- Species: E. flavidens

Binomial name
- Euxoa flavidens (Smith, 1888)

= Euxoa flavidens =

Species of moth

Euxoa flavidens is a species of cutworm or dart moth in the family Noctuidae. It is found in North America.

The MONA or Hodges number for Euxoa flavidens is 10758.
