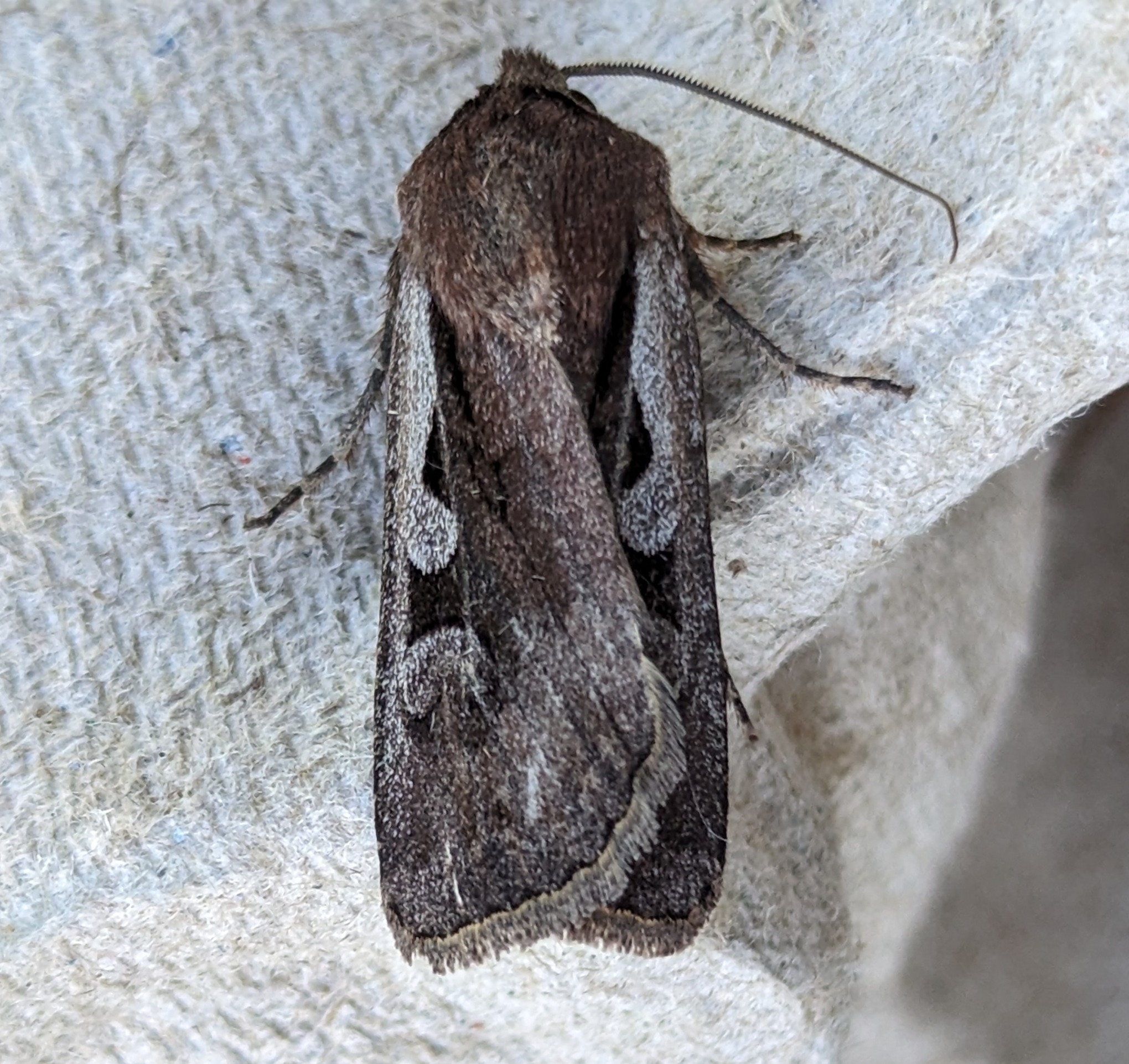

Scientific classification
- Domain: Eukaryota
- Kingdom: Animalia
- Phylum: Arthropoda
- Class: Insecta
- Order: Lepidoptera
- Superfamily: Noctuoidea
- Family: Noctuidae
- Genus: Euxoa
- Species: E. idahoensis

Binomial name
- Euxoa idahoensis (Grote, 1878)

= Euxoa idahoensis =

Species of moth

Euxoa idahoensis is a species of cutworm or dart moth in the family Noctuidae. It is found in North America.
