= Euxoa henrietta =

Scientific classification
- Kingdom: Animalia
- Phylum: Arthropoda
- Clade: Pancrustacea
- Class: Insecta
- Order: Lepidoptera
- Superfamily: Noctuoidea
- Family: Noctuidae
- Genus: Euxoa
- Species: E. henrietta

Binomial name
- Euxoa henrietta (Smith, 1900)

Synonyms
- Carneades henrietta Smith, 1900; Euxoa delicata Barnes & McDunnough, 1912; Euxoa adusta Barnes & McDunnough, 1912

Species of moth

Euxoa henrietta is a moth of the family Noctuidae. It is found in North America, including Washington, Montana and California.
