= Euxoa xasta =

Scientific classification
- Domain: Eukaryota
- Kingdom: Animalia
- Phylum: Arthropoda
- Class: Insecta
- Order: Lepidoptera
- Superfamily: Noctuoidea
- Family: Noctuidae
- Genus: Euxoa
- Species: E. xasta

Binomial name
- Euxoa xasta Barnes & McDunnough, 1910

Species of moth

Euxoa xasta is a species of cutworm or dart moth in the family Noctuidae first described by William Barnes and James Halliday McDunnough in 1910. It is found in North America.

The MONA or Hodges number for Euxoa xasta is 10821.
