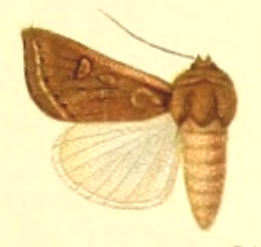

Scientific classification
- Domain: Eukaryota
- Kingdom: Animalia
- Phylum: Arthropoda
- Class: Insecta
- Order: Lepidoptera
- Superfamily: Noctuoidea
- Family: Noctuidae
- Genus: Euxoa
- Species: E. rugifrons

Binomial name
- Euxoa rugifrons (Mabille, 1888)

Synonyms
- Noctua rugifrons Mabille, 1888; Agrotis rugifrons; Agrotis bledi (Chretien, 1911); Agrotis urbana (Bang-Haas, 1912); Euxoa urbana Bang-Haas, 1912

= Euxoa rugifrons =

Species of moth

Euxoa rugifrons is a moth of the family Noctuidae. It is found in North Africa, including Tunisia, Algeria, Morocco and Libya.

Adults are on wing in September.
