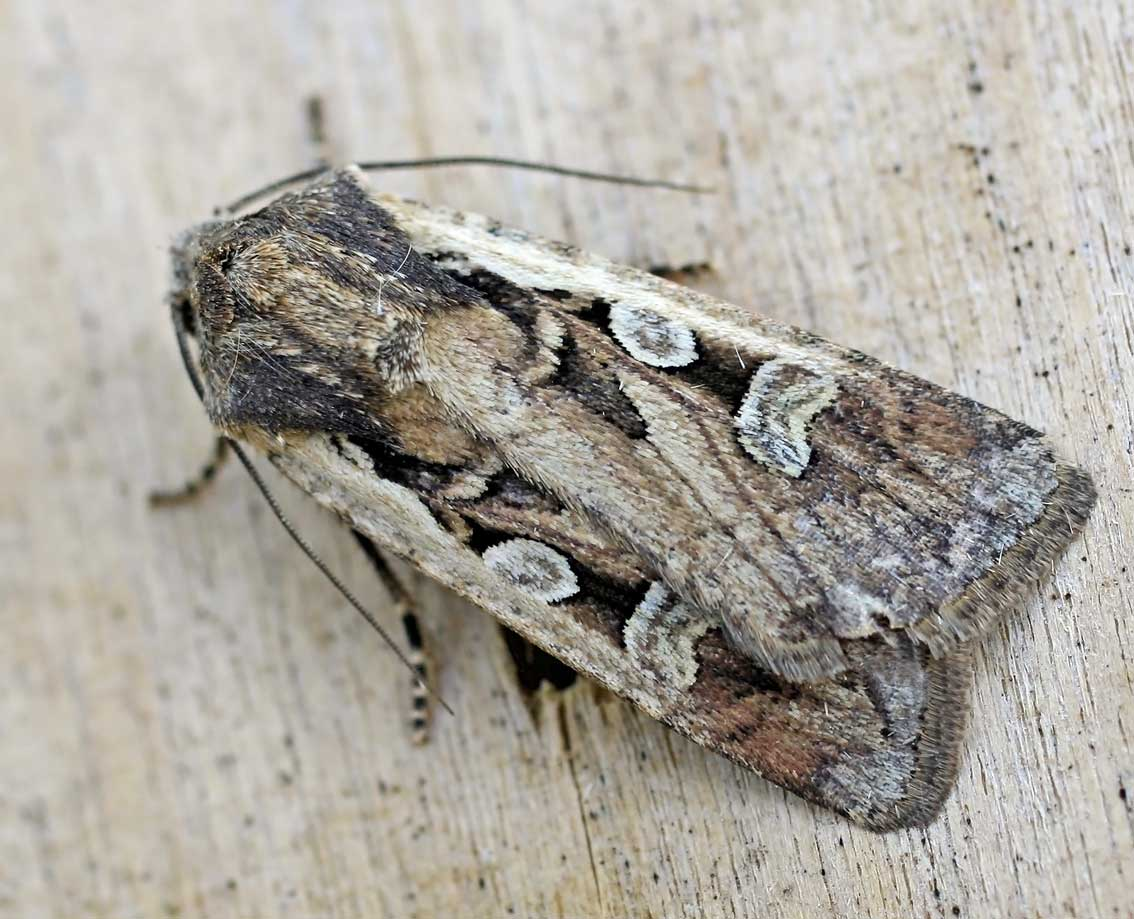
- Euxoa temera

Scientific classification
- Kingdom: Animalia
- Phylum: Arthropoda
- Clade: Pancrustacea
- Class: Insecta
- Order: Lepidoptera
- Superfamily: Noctuoidea
- Family: Noctuidae
- Subfamily: Noctuinae
- Tribe: Noctuini
- Subtribe: Agrotina
- Genus: Euxoa; Hübner, 1821

= Euxoa =

Genus of moths

Euxoa is a genus of moths of the family Noctuidae erected by the German entomologist, Jacob Hübner. The genus is mostly confined to dry and semi dry areas in the northern hemisphere. There 130 species in Eurasia, a few in Africa, and 175 in North America. There are no species in the genus in South-East Asia or in Australia. In North America, most species are found in western regions. Of the North American species, four are endemic to Mexico. There is one species recorded from Chile, but this may be a mislabeled specimen. In real terms, species numbers do not equal species abundance. Some areas with few species have large numbers of the ones that do live there.

In North America there are seven subgenera; Chorizagrotis, Palaeoeuxoa, Heteroeuxoa, Longivesica, Pleuonectopoda, Orstagrotis, and Euxoa.

The larvae of this genus are cutworms, living in the soil but feeding on the surface. A few species also climb. Most larval Euxoa hatch from eggs laid in autumn, and most go through a summer diapause, before pupating when the temperature drops later in the summer. The genus includes the prolific miller moths, which are full adult army cutworms labeled as the species Euxoa auxiliaris and common in North America. This species is also a crucial late summer food source for grizzly bears (Ursus arctos horribilis) in the Greater Yellowstone Ecosystem.

== Species ==
- Euxoa aberrans McDunnough, 1932
- Euxoa absona Lafontaine, 1987
- Euxoa acuminifera (Eversmann, 1854)
- Euxoa adumbrata (Eversmann, 1842)
- Euxoa aequalis (Harvey, 1876)
- Euxoa agema (Strecker, 1899)
- Euxoa albipennis (Grote, 1876)
- Euxoa altens McDunnough, 1946
- Euxoa anarmodia (Staudinger, 1897)
- Euxoa annulipes (Smith, 1890)
- Euxoa antica Lafontaine, 1974
- Euxoa apopsis Troubridge & Lafontaine, 2010
- Euxoa aquilina (Denis & Schiffermüller, 1775)
- Euxoa atomaris (Smith, 1890)
- Euxoa atristrigata (Smith, 1890)
- Euxoa aurantiaca Lafontaine, 1974
- Euxoa auripennis Lafontaine, 1974
- Euxoa aurulenta (Smith, 1890)
- Euxoa austrina Hardwick, 1968
- Euxoa auxiliaris (Grote, 1873) – army cutworm
- Euxoa baja Lafontaine, 1987
- Euxoa basalis (Grote, 1879)
- Euxoa basigramma (Staudinger, 1870)
- Euxoa beatissima (Rebel, 1917)
- Euxoa bicollaris (Grote, 1878)
- Euxoa bifasciata (Smith, 1888)
- Euxoa biformata Smith, 1910
- Euxoa birivia (Denis & Schiffermüller, 1775)
- Euxoa bochus (Morrison, 1874)
- Euxoa bogdanovi (Erschoff, 1873)
- Euxoa bostoniensis (Grote, 1874)
- Euxoa brevipennis (Smith, 1888)
- Euxoa brunneigera (Grote, 1876)
- Euxoa camalpa (Dyar, 1912)
- Euxoa campestris (Grote, 1875)
- Euxoa cana Lafontaine, 1974
- Euxoa canariensis Rebel, 1902
- Euxoa cashmirensis Hampson 1903
- Euxoa castanea Lafontaine, 1981
- Euxoa catenula (Grote, 1879)
- Euxoa centralis (Staudinger, 1899)
- Euxoa chimoensis Hardwick, 1966
- Euxoa choris (Harvey, 1876)
- Euxoa christophi (Staudinger, 1870)
- Euxoa churchillensis (McDunnough, 1932)
- Euxoa cicatricosa (Grote & Robinson, 1865)
- Euxoa cinchonina (Guenée, 1852)
- Euxoa cincta Barnes & Benjamin, 1924
- Euxoa cinereopallida (Smith, 1903)
- Euxoa cinnabarina Barnes & McDunnough, 1918
- Euxoa citricolor (Grote, 1880)
- Euxoa clauda Püngeler, 1906
- Euxoa clausa McDunnough, 1923
- Euxoa coconino Lafontaine, 1987
- Euxoa cognita (Staudinger, 1881)
- Euxoa comosa (Morrison, 1876)
- Euxoa cona (Strecker, 1898)
- Euxoa conjuncta (Smith, 1890)
- Euxoa conspicua (Hübner, [1827])
- Euxoa continentalis Reisser, 1935
- Euxoa cos (Hübner, [1824])
- Euxoa costata (Grote, 1876)
- Euxoa crassilinea (Wallengren, 1860)
- Euxoa crypta (Dadd, 1927)
- Euxoa cryptica Hardwick, 1968
- Euxoa culminicola (Staudinger, 1870)
- Euxoa cursoria (Hufnagel, 1766) – coast dart
- Euxoa dargo (Strecker, 1898)
- Euxoa declarata (Walker, 1865)
- Euxoa decora (Denis & Schiffermüller, 1775)
- Euxoa deficiens (Wagner, 1913)
- Euxoa derrae Hacker, 1985
- Euxoa deserta (Staudinger, 1870)
- Euxoa deserticola I.Kozhantshikov, 1937
- Euxoa detersa (Walker, 1856)
- Euxoa diaphora Boursin, 1928
- Euxoa difformis (Smith, 1900) (syn: Euxoa mercedes Barnes & McDunnough, 1912)
- Euxoa dissona (Möschler, 1860)
- Euxoa distinguenda (Lederer, 1857)
- Euxoa divergens (Walker, [1857])
- Euxoa dodi McDunnough, 1923
- Euxoa edictalis (Smith, 1893)
- Euxoa emma L. G. Crabo & A. Crabo, 2007
- Euxoa emolliensis (Hampson, 1905)
- Euxoa enixa (Püngeler, 1906)
- Euxoa eruta (Hübner, [1827])
- Euxoa excogita (Smith, 1900)
- Euxoa extranea (Smith, 1888)
- Euxoa fallax (Eversmann, 1854)
- Euxoa faulkneri Mustelin, 2000
- Euxoa fissa Staudinger, 1895
- Euxoa flavicollis (Smith, 1888)
- Euxoa flavidens (Smith, 1888)
- Euxoa flavogrisea Corti, 1932
- Euxoa foeda (Lederer, 1855)
- Euxoa foeminalis (Smith, 1900)
- Euxoa franclemonti Lafontaine, 1987
- Euxoa fumalis (Grote, 1873)
- Euxoa furtivus (Smith, 1890)
- Euxoa fuscigera (Grote, 1874) (sometimes misspelled as fuscigerus)
- Euxoa glabella Wagner, 1930
- Euxoa goetria I.Kozhantshikov, 1929
- Euxoa guadalupensis Lafontaine & Byers, 1982
- Euxoa hardwicki Lafontaine, 1987
- Euxoa hastifera (Donzel, 1848)
- Euxoa haverkampfi (Standfuss, 1893)
- Euxoa henrietta (Smith, 1900)
- Euxoa heringi (Staudinger, 1877)
- Euxoa hilaris (Freyer, 1838)
- Euxoa hollemani (Grote, 1874) (syn: Euxoa andera Smith, 1910)
- Euxoa homicida (Staudinger, 1900)
- Euxoa hyperborea Lafontaine, 1987
- Euxoa idahoensis (Grote, 1878)
- Euxoa immixta (Grote, 1881)
- Euxoa inconcinna (Harvey, 1875)
- Euxoa infausta (Walker, 1865)
- Euxoa infracta (Morrison, 1875)
- Euxoa inscripta Lafontaine, 1981
- Euxoa intermontana Lafontaine, 1975
- Euxoa intolerabilis (Püngeler, 1902)
- Euxoa intrita (Morrison, 1875)
- Euxoa inyoca Benjamin, 1936
- Euxoa juliae Hardwick, 1968
- Euxoa karschi (Graeser, [1890] 1889)
- Euxoa laetificans Smith, 1894
- Euxoa lafontainei Metzler & Forbes, 2009
- Euxoa latro (Barnes & Benjamin, 1926)
- Euxoa lecerfi Zerny, 1934
- Euxoa leuschneri Lafontaine, 1987
- Euxoa lewisi (Grote, 1873)
  - Euxoa lewisi lewisi (Grote, 1873)
  - Euxoa lewisi julia Hardwick, 1968
- Euxoa lilloeet McDunnough, 1927
- Euxoa lineifrons (Smith, 1890)
- Euxoa lucida Barnes & McDunnough, 1912
- Euxoa luctuosa Lafontaine, 1976
- Euxoa macleani McDunnough, 1927
- Euxoa macrodentata Hardwick, 1965
- Euxoa maderensis Lafontaine, 1976
- Euxoa maimes (Smith, 1903)
- Euxoa malickyi Varga, 1990
- Euxoa manitobana McDunnough, 1925
- Euxoa mansour (Le Cerf, 1933)
- Euxoa medialis (Smith, 1888)
- Euxoa melana Lafontaine, 1975
- Euxoa melura McDunnough, 1932
- Euxoa mendelis Fernández, 1915
- Euxoa messoria (Harris, 1841) – reaper dart
- Euxoa mimallonis (Grote, 1873)
- Euxoa misturata (Smith, 1890)
- Euxoa mitis (Smith, 1894)
- Euxoa mobergi Fibiger, 1990
- Euxoa moerens (Grote, 1883)
- Euxoa mojave Lafontaine, 1987
- Euxoa montana (Morrison, 1875)
- Euxoa montivaga Fibiger, 1997
- Euxoa muldersi Lafontaine & Hensel, 2010
- Euxoa munis (Grote, 1879)
- Euxoa murdocki (Smith, 1890)
- Euxoa mustelina (Christoph, 1876)
- Euxoa nevada (Smith, 1900)
- Euxoa nevadensis Corti, 1928
- Euxoa nigricans (Linnaeus, 1761) – garden dart
- Euxoa nigrofusca (Esper, 1788) – White-line Dart
- Euxoa niveilinea (Grote, [1883])
- Euxoa nomas Erschoff, 1874 (syn: Euxoa incognita (Smith, 1894))
- Euxoa nostra (Smith, 1890)
- Euxoa nyctopis Hampson, 1903
- Euxoa obelisca (Denis & Schiffermüller, 1775) – square-spot dart
- Euxoa obeliscoides (Guenée, 1852)
- Euxoa oberfoelli Hardwick, 1973
- Euxoa oblongistigma (Smith, 1888)
- Euxoa occidentalis Lafontaine & Byers, 1982
- Euxoa ochrogaster (Guenée, 1852) – redbacked cutworm
- Euxoa olivalis (Grote, 1879)
- Euxoa olivia (Morrison, 1876)
- Euxoa oncocnemoides (Barnes & Benjamin, 1926)
- Euxoa oranaria (Bang-Haas, 1906)
- Euxoa pallidimacula Lafontaine, 1987
- Euxoa pallipennis (Smith, 1888)
- Euxoa penelope Fibiger, 1997
- Euxoa perexcellens (Grote, 1875)
- Euxoa permixta McDunnough, 1940
- Euxoa perolivalis (Smith, 1905)
- Euxoa perpolita (Morrison, 1876)
- Euxoa pestula Smith, 1904
- Euxoa phantoma (Kozhanchikov, 1928)
- Euxoa pimensis Barnes & McDunnough, 1910
- Euxoa piniae Buckett & Bauer, 1964
- Euxoa plagigera (Morrison, 1875)
- Euxoa pleuritica (Grote, 1876)
- Euxoa pluralis (Grote, 1878)
- Euxoa powelli (Oberthür, 1912)
- Euxoa punctigera (Walker, 1865)
- Euxoa quadridentata (Grote & Robinson, 1865)
- Euxoa quebecensis (Smith, 1900)
- Euxoa recula (Harvey, 1876)
- Euxoa recussa (Hübner, [1817])
- Euxoa redimicula (Morrison, 1875)
- Euxoa ridingsiana (Grote, 1875)
- Euxoa riversii (Dyar, 1903)
- Euxoa robiginosa (Staudinger, 1895)
- Euxoa rockburnei Hardwick, 1973
- Euxoa rufula (Smith, 1888)
- Euxoa rugifrons (Mabille, 1888)
- Euxoa sabuletorum (Boisduval, 1840)
- Euxoa satiens (Smith, 1890)
- Euxoa satis (Harvey, 1876)
- Euxoa sayvana Ronkay, Varga & Hreblay, 1998
- Euxoa scandens (Riley, 1869)
- Euxoa scholastica McDunnough, 1920
- Euxoa scotogrammoides McDunnough, 1932
- Euxoa sculptilis (Harvey, 1875)
- Euxoa segnilis (Duponchel, 1837)
- Euxoa selenis (Smith, 1900)
- Euxoa septentrionalis (Walker, 1865)
- Euxoa serotina Lafontaine, 1975
- Euxoa serricornis (Smith, 1888)
- Euxoa servita (Smith, 1895) (sometimes misspelled as servitus)
- Euxoa setonia McDunnough, 1927
- Euxoa shasta Lafontaine, 1975
  - Euxoa shasta shasta Lafontaine, 1975
  - Euxoa shasta condita Lafontaine, 1975
- Euxoa sibirica (Boisduval, [1837])
- Euxoa siccata (Smith, 1893)
- Euxoa silens (Grote, 1875)
- Euxoa simona McDunnough, 1932
- Euxoa simulata McDunnough, 1946
- Euxoa sinelinea Hardwick, 1965
- Euxoa spumata McDunnough, 1940
- Euxoa stigmatalis (Smith, 1900)
- Euxoa stygialis (Barnes & McDunnough, 1912)
- Euxoa subandera Lafontaine, 1987
- Euxoa taura Smith, 1905 (syn: Euxoa cooki McDunnough, 1925)
- Euxoa teleboa (Smith, 1890)
- Euxoa temera (Hübner, [1808])
- Euxoa terrealis (Grote, 1883)
- Euxoa terrena (Smith, 1900) (sometimes misspelled as terrenus)
- Euxoa tessellata (Harris, 1841)
- Euxoa tibetana (Moore 1878)
- Euxoa tocoyae (Smith, 1900)
- Euxoa triaena Kozhanchikov, 1929
- Euxoa trifasciata (Smith, 1888)
- Euxoa tristicula (Morrison, 1875)
- Euxoa tristis (Staudinger, 1898)
- Euxoa tritici (Linnaeus, 1761) – whiteline dart
- Euxoa tronellus (Smith, 1903)
- Euxoa unica McDunnough, 1940
- Euxoa ustulata Lafontaine, 1976
- Euxoa vallus (Smith, 1900)
  - Euxoa vallus vallus (Smith, 1900)
  - Euxoa vallus luteosita (Smith, 1900)
  - Euxoa vallus bivittata (Smith, 1900)
- Euxoa velleripennis Lafontaine, 1987
- Euxoa vernalis Lafontaine, 1976
- Euxoa vetusta (Walker, 1865)
- Euxoa violaris (Grote & Robinson, 1868)
- Euxoa vitta (Esper, 1789)
- Euxoa wagneri Corti, 1926
- Euxoa westermanni (Staudinger, 1857)
- Euxoa wilsoni (Grote, 1873)
- Euxoa xasta Barnes & McDunnough, 1910
- Euxoa zernyi Boursin, 1944
