= Euxoa scholastica =

Scientific classification
- Domain: Eukaryota
- Kingdom: Animalia
- Phylum: Arthropoda
- Class: Insecta
- Order: Lepidoptera
- Superfamily: Noctuoidea
- Family: Noctuidae
- Genus: Euxoa
- Species: E. scholastica

Binomial name
- Euxoa scholastica McDunnough, 1920

Species of moth

Euxoa scholastica, the scholastic dart, is a moth of the family Noctuidae. It is found from Nova Scotia to Ontario and Wisconsin, south to North Carolina.

The wingspan is about 28 mm. Adults are on wing from July to August.
