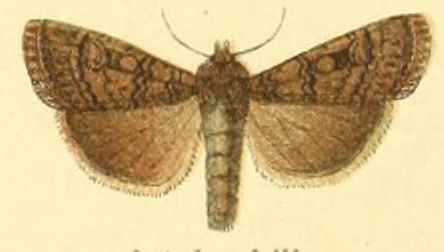

Scientific classification
- Domain: Eukaryota
- Kingdom: Animalia
- Phylum: Arthropoda
- Class: Insecta
- Order: Lepidoptera
- Superfamily: Noctuoidea
- Family: Noctuidae
- Genus: Euxoa
- Species: E. intolerabilis

Binomial name
- Euxoa intolerabilis (Püngeler, 1902)

Synonyms
- Agrotis intolerabilis Püngeler, 1902; Diarsa arida Corti and Draudt, 1933; Rhyacia arida (Corti and Draudt, 1933); Agrotis predotae Schawerda, 1922

= Euxoa intolerabilis =

Species of moth

Euxoa intolerabilis is a moth of the family Noctuidae. It is found in Siberia, Tibet and China.
