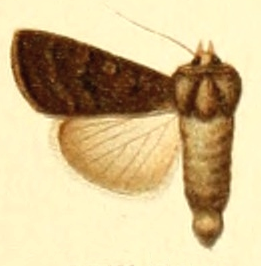

Scientific classification
- Kingdom: Animalia
- Phylum: Arthropoda
- Class: Insecta
- Order: Lepidoptera
- Superfamily: Noctuoidea
- Family: Noctuidae
- Genus: Euxoa
- Species: E. homicida

Binomial name
- Euxoa homicida (Staudinger, 1900)

Synonyms
- Agrotis homicida

= Euxoa homicida =

Species of moth

Euxoa homicida is a moth of the family Noctuidae. It is found in Turkey, Armenia and north-western Pakistan.
