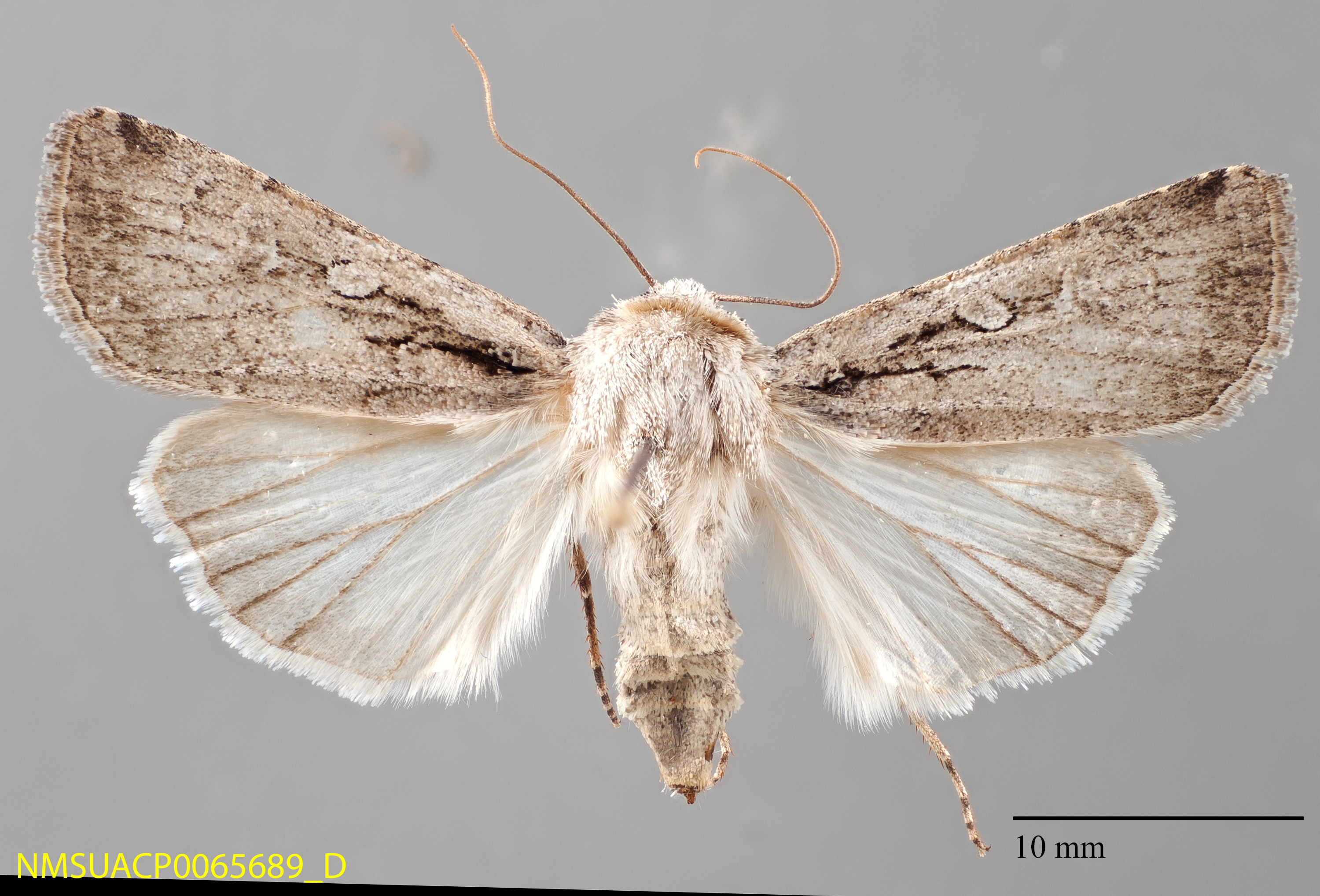

Scientific classification
- Domain: Eukaryota
- Kingdom: Animalia
- Phylum: Arthropoda
- Class: Insecta
- Order: Lepidoptera
- Superfamily: Noctuoidea
- Family: Noctuidae
- Genus: Euxoa
- Species: E. pimensis

Binomial name
- Euxoa pimensis Barnes & McDunnough, 1910

= Euxoa pimensis =

Species of moth

Euxoa pimensis is a species of cutworm or dart moth in the family Noctuidae first described by William Barnes and James Halliday McDunnough in 1910. It is found in North America.

The MONA or Hodges number for Euxoa pimensis is 10752.
