= Euxoa cinnabarina =

Scientific classification
- Domain: Eukaryota
- Kingdom: Animalia
- Phylum: Arthropoda
- Class: Insecta
- Order: Lepidoptera
- Superfamily: Noctuoidea
- Family: Noctuidae
- Genus: Euxoa
- Species: E. cinnabarina

Binomial name
- Euxoa cinnabarina Barnes & McDunnough, 1918

Species of cutworm or dart moth

Euxoa cinnabarina is a species of cutworm or dart moth in the family Noctuidae first described by William Barnes and James Halliday McDunnough in 1918. It is found in North America.

The MONA or Hodges number for Euxoa cinnabarina is 10797.
