= Euxoa atristrigata =

Scientific classification
- Domain: Eukaryota
- Kingdom: Animalia
- Phylum: Arthropoda
- Class: Insecta
- Order: Lepidoptera
- Superfamily: Noctuoidea
- Family: Noctuidae
- Genus: Euxoa
- Species: E. atristrigata

Binomial name
- Euxoa atristrigata (Smith, 1890)

Synonyms
- Agrotis atristrigata Smith, 1890; Carneades collocata Smith, 1894

Species of moth

Euxoa atristrigata is a moth of the family Noctuidae. It is found from British Columbia and Saskatchewan, south to California.
