= Euxoa wilsoni =

Scientific classification
- Kingdom: Animalia
- Phylum: Arthropoda
- Class: Insecta
- Order: Lepidoptera
- Superfamily: Noctuoidea
- Family: Noctuidae
- Genus: Euxoa
- Species: E. wilsoni

Binomial name
- Euxoa wilsoni (Grote, 1873)

Species of moth

Euxoa wilsoni is a species of cutworm or dart moth in the family Noctuidae. It is found in North America.

The MONA or Hodges number for Euxoa wilsoni is 10867.
