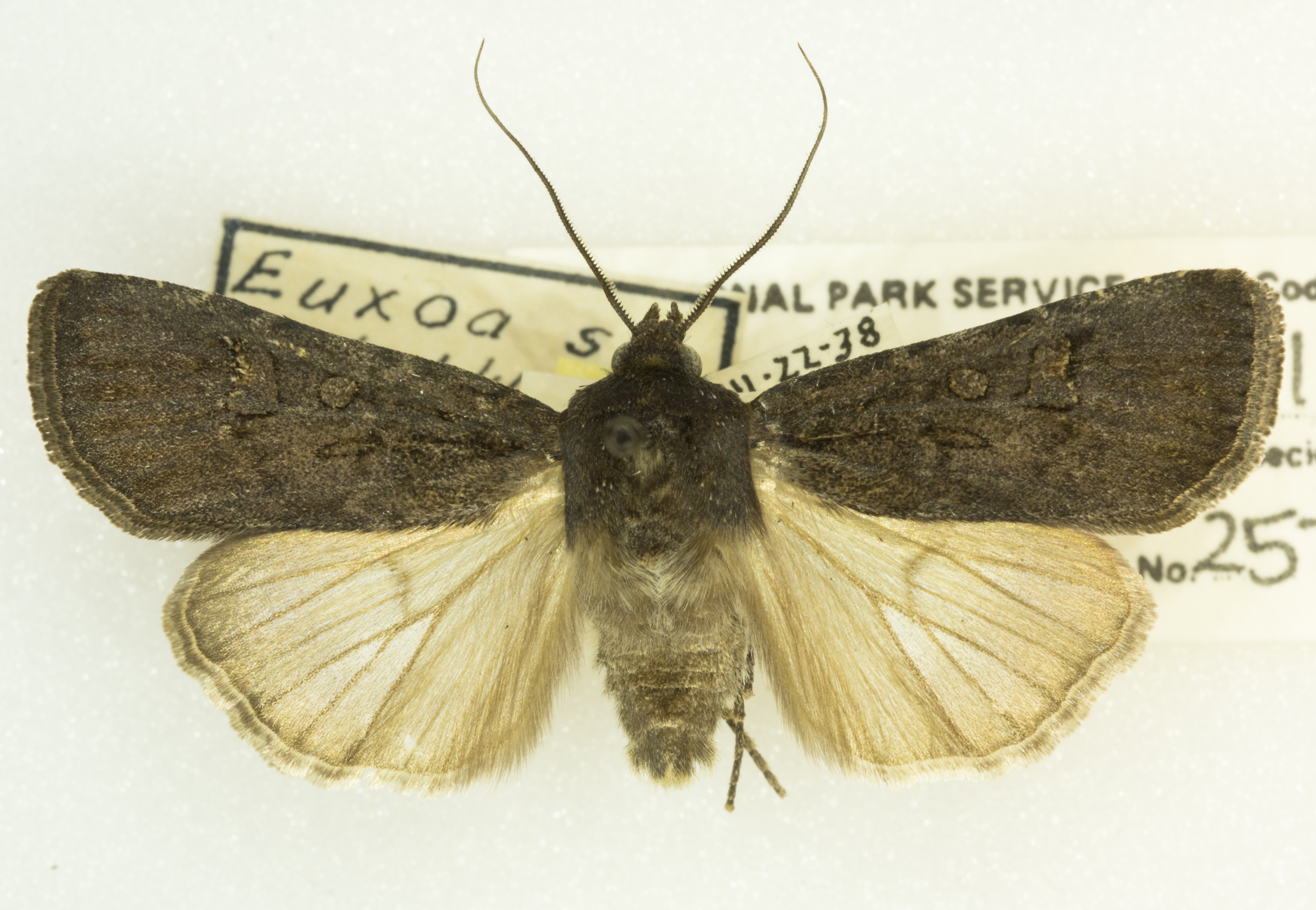

Scientific classification
- Domain: Eukaryota
- Kingdom: Animalia
- Phylum: Arthropoda
- Class: Insecta
- Order: Lepidoptera
- Superfamily: Noctuoidea
- Family: Noctuidae
- Genus: Euxoa
- Species: E. stygialis

Binomial name
- Euxoa stygialis Barnes & McDunnough, 1912

= Euxoa stygialis =

Species of moth

Euxoa stygialis is a species of cutworm or dart moth in the family Noctuidae first described by William Barnes and James Halliday McDunnough in 1912. It is found in North America.

The MONA or Hodges number for Euxoa stygialis is 10761.
