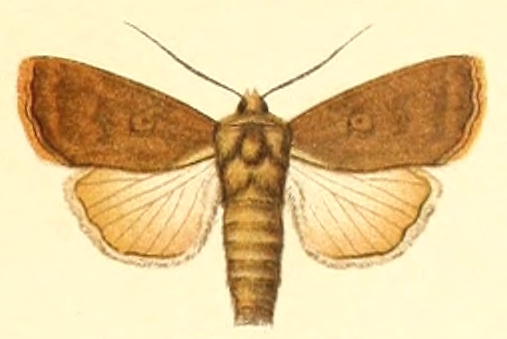

Scientific classification
- Domain: Eukaryota
- Kingdom: Animalia
- Phylum: Arthropoda
- Class: Insecta
- Order: Lepidoptera
- Superfamily: Noctuoidea
- Family: Noctuidae
- Genus: Euxoa
- Species: E. acuminifera

Binomial name
- Euxoa acuminifera (Eversmann, 1854)

Synonyms
- Hadena acuminifera Eversmann, 1854

= Euxoa acuminifera =

Species of moth

Euxoa acuminifera is a moth of the family Noctuidae. It is found in southern Russia, Turkestan and central Asia.
