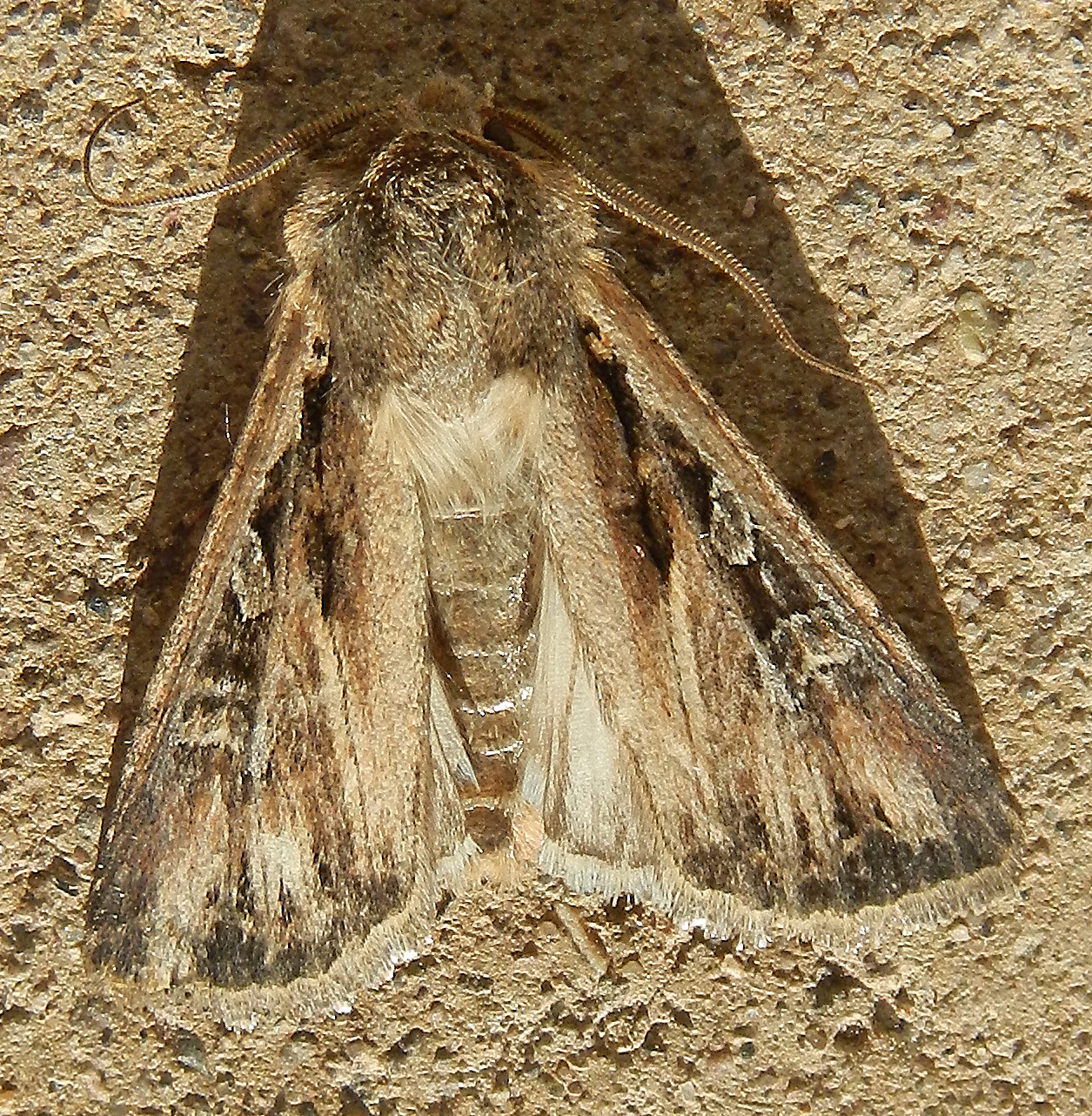

Scientific classification
- Kingdom: Animalia
- Phylum: Arthropoda
- Clade: Pancrustacea
- Class: Insecta
- Order: Lepidoptera
- Superfamily: Noctuoidea
- Family: Noctuidae
- Genus: Euxoa
- Species: E. olivalis

Binomial name
- Euxoa olivalis (Grote, 1879)

= Euxoa olivalis =

Species of moth

Euxoa olivalis is a species of cutworm or dart moth in the family Noctuidae. It occurs in North America.
