= Euxoa cashmirensis =

Scientific classification
- Kingdom: Animalia
- Phylum: Arthropoda
- Class: Insecta
- Order: Lepidoptera
- Superfamily: Noctuoidea
- Family: Noctuidae
- Genus: Euxoa
- Species: E. cashmirensis

Binomial name
- Euxoa cashmirensis Hampson, 1903

Synonyms
- Orosagrotis cashmirensis

Species of moth

Euxoa cashmirensis is a species of moth of the family Noctuidae. It is found in Kashmir. The current status of the species needs further study.
