= Euxoa camalpa =

Scientific classification
- Kingdom: Animalia
- Phylum: Arthropoda
- Class: Insecta
- Order: Lepidoptera
- Superfamily: Noctuoidea
- Family: Noctuidae
- Genus: Euxoa
- Species: E. camalpa

Binomial name
- Euxoa camalpa (Dyar, 1912)

Species of moth

Euxoa camalpa is a species of cutworm or dart moth in the family Noctuidae. It is found in North America.

The MONA or Hodges number for Euxoa camalpa is 10772.

== Subspecies ==
These two subspecies belong to the species Euxoa camalpa:

- Euxoa camalpa camalpa
- Euxoa camalpa manca Benjamin, 1936
