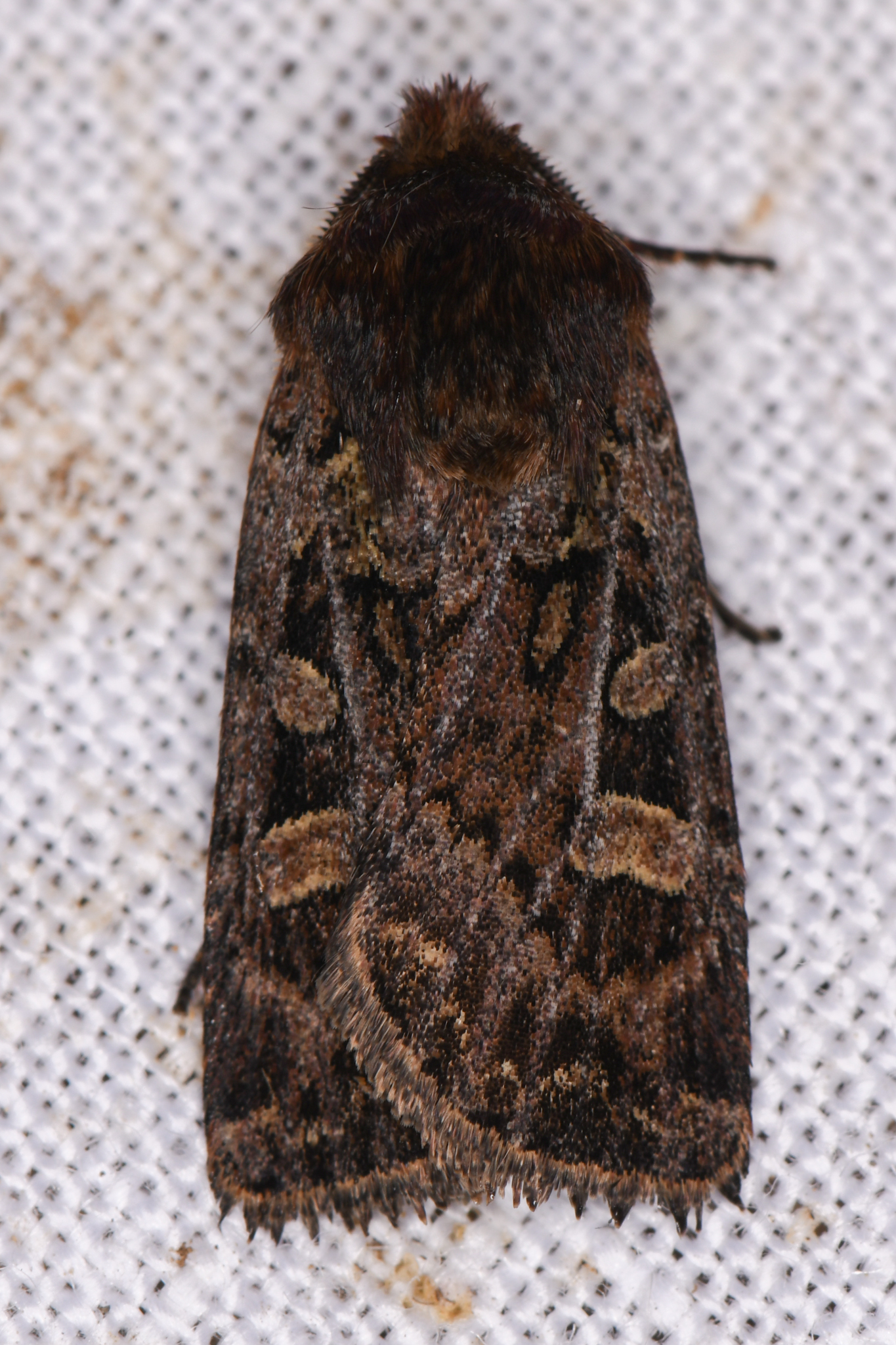

Scientific classification
- Kingdom: Animalia
- Phylum: Arthropoda
- Class: Insecta
- Order: Lepidoptera
- Superfamily: Noctuoidea
- Family: Noctuidae
- Genus: Euxoa
- Species: E. lewisi

Binomial name
- Euxoa lewisi (Grote, 1873)

= Euxoa lewisi =

Species of moth

Euxoa lewisi, commonly known as the Oregon dart, is a species of cutworm or dart moth in the family Noctuidae. It is found in North America.

== Subspecies ==
These two subspecies belong to the species Euxoa lewisi:

- Euxoa lewisi julia Hardwick, 1968
- Euxoa lewisi lewisi (Grote, 1873)
