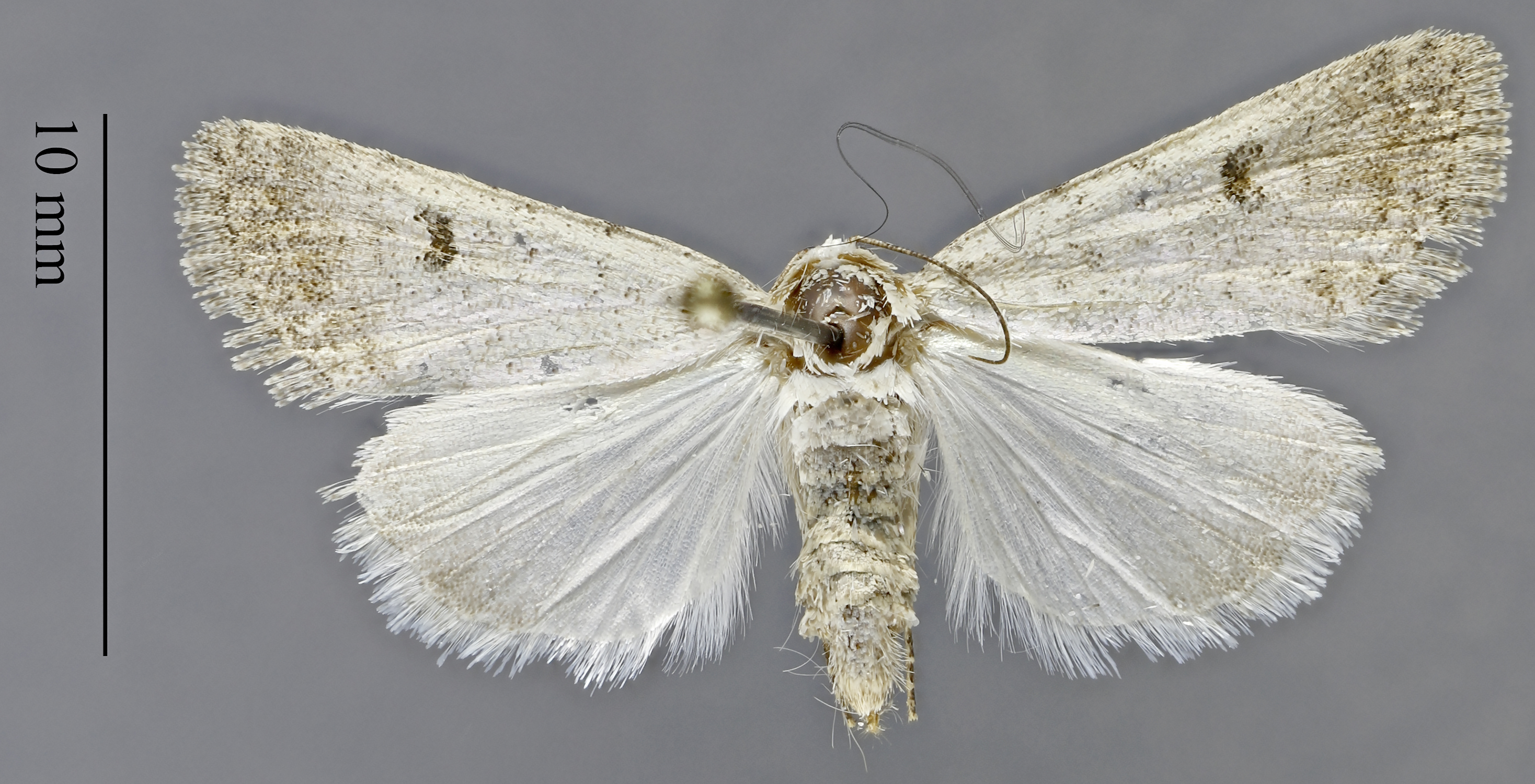

Scientific classification
- Domain: Eukaryota
- Kingdom: Animalia
- Phylum: Arthropoda
- Class: Insecta
- Order: Lepidoptera
- Superfamily: Noctuoidea
- Family: Noctuidae
- Tribe: Noctuini
- Subtribe: Agrotina
- Genus: Anicla
- Species: A. tenuescens

Binomial name
- Anicla tenuescens (Smith, 1890)

= Anicla tenuescens =

Species of moth

Anicla tenuescens is a species of cutworm or dart moth in the family Noctuidae.

The MONA or Hodges number for Anicla tenuescens is 10909.
