= Euxoa servitus =

Scientific classification
- Domain: Eukaryota
- Kingdom: Animalia
- Phylum: Arthropoda
- Class: Insecta
- Order: Lepidoptera
- Superfamily: Noctuoidea
- Family: Noctuidae
- Tribe: Noctuini
- Subtribe: Agrotina
- Genus: Euxoa
- Species: E. servitus

Binomial name
- Euxoa servitus (Smith, 1895)

Species of moth

Euxoa servitus, the slave dart, is a species of cutworm or dart moth in the family Noctuidae.

The MONA or Hodges number for Euxoa servitus is 10854.
