= Anicla sullivani =

Scientific classification
- Kingdom: Animalia
- Phylum: Arthropoda
- Clade: Pancrustacea
- Class: Insecta
- Order: Lepidoptera
- Superfamily: Noctuoidea
- Family: Noctuidae
- Tribe: Noctuini
- Subtribe: Agrotina
- Genus: Anicla
- Species: A. sullivani

Binomial name
- Anicla sullivani Lafontaine, 2004

Species of moth

Anicla sullivani, or Sullivan's anicla, is a species of cutworm or dart moth in the family Noctuidae. It is found in North America.
