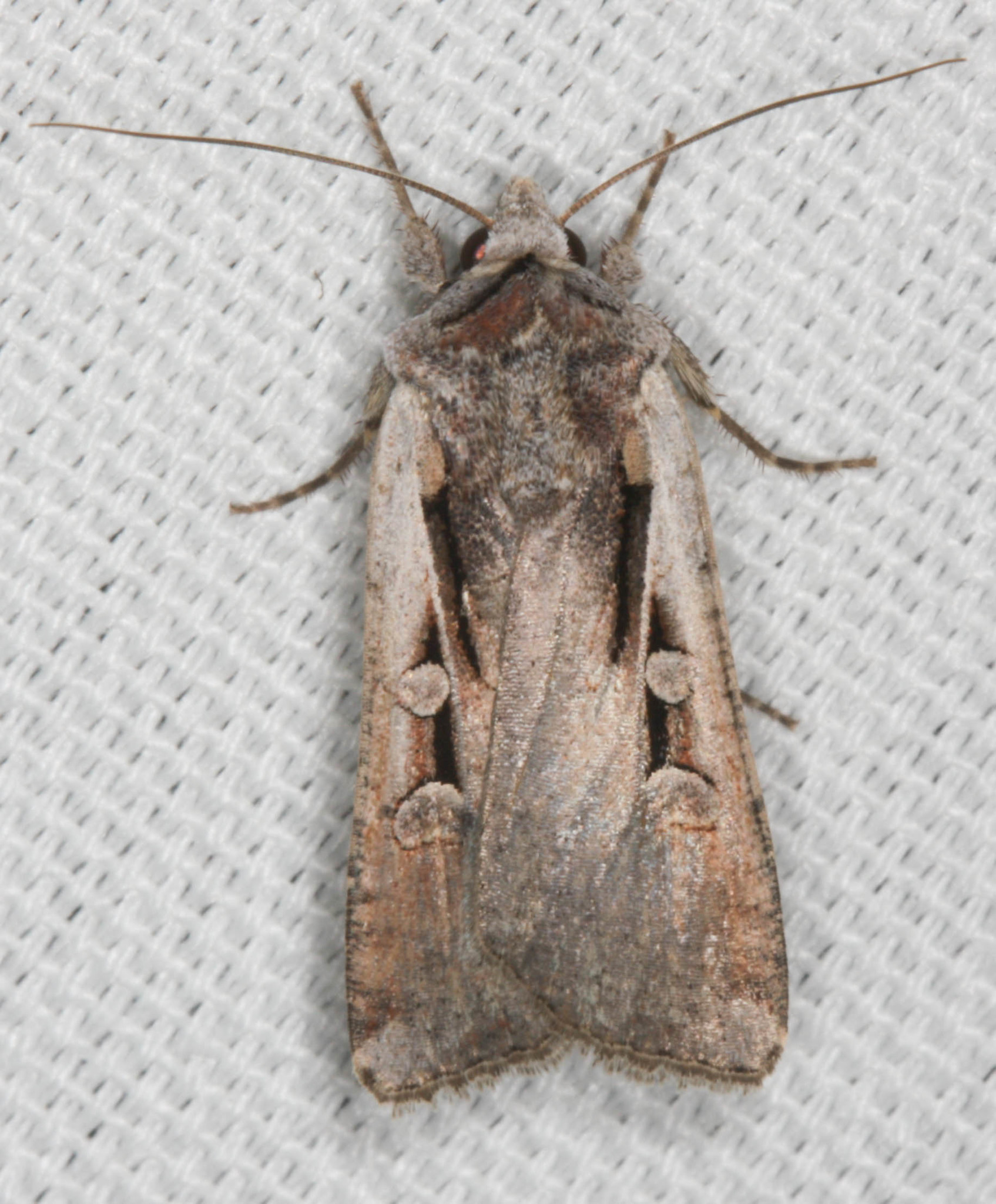

Scientific classification
- Domain: Eukaryota
- Kingdom: Animalia
- Phylum: Arthropoda
- Class: Insecta
- Order: Lepidoptera
- Superfamily: Noctuoidea
- Family: Noctuidae
- Tribe: Noctuini
- Subtribe: Agrotina
- Genus: Hemieuxoa
- Species: H. rudens

Binomial name
- Hemieuxoa rudens (Harvey, 1875)

= Hemieuxoa rudens =

Species of moth

Hemieuxoa rudens is a species of cutworm or dart moth in the family Noctuidae. It is found in North America.
