= Anicla cemolia =

Scientific classification
- Domain: Eukaryota
- Kingdom: Animalia
- Phylum: Arthropoda
- Class: Insecta
- Order: Lepidoptera
- Superfamily: Noctuoidea
- Family: Noctuidae
- Tribe: Noctuini
- Subtribe: Agrotina
- Genus: Anicla
- Species: A. cemolia

Binomial name
- Anicla cemolia Franclemont, 1967

Species of moth

Anicla cemolia is a species of cutworm or dart moth in the family Noctuidae. It is found in North America.

The MONA or Hodges number for Anicla cemolia is 10912.
