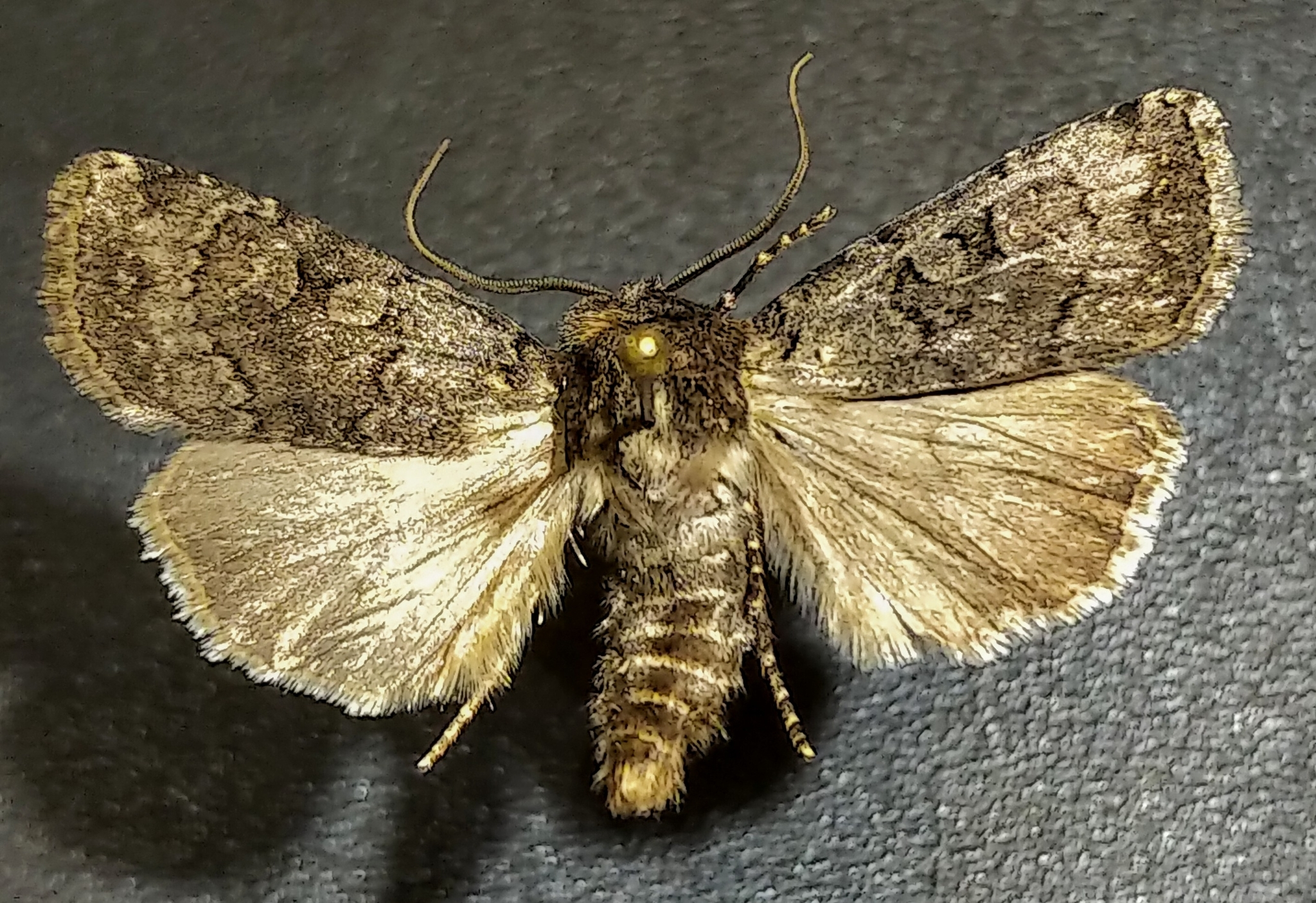

Scientific classification
- Kingdom: Animalia
- Phylum: Arthropoda
- Class: Insecta
- Order: Lepidoptera
- Superfamily: Noctuoidea
- Family: Noctuidae
- Tribe: Noctuini
- Subtribe: Agrotina
- Genus: Euxoa
- Species: E. infausta

Binomial name
- Euxoa infausta (Walker, 1865)

= Euxoa infausta =

Species of moth

Euxoa infausta, commonly known as the variable dart or dingy dart, is a species of cutworm or dart moth in the family Noctuidae. It is found in North America.
