= Richia serano =

Scientific classification
- Domain: Eukaryota
- Kingdom: Animalia
- Phylum: Arthropoda
- Class: Insecta
- Order: Lepidoptera
- Superfamily: Noctuoidea
- Family: Noctuidae
- Tribe: Noctuini
- Subtribe: Agrotina
- Genus: Richia
- Species: R. serano

Binomial name
- Richia serano (Smith, 1910)

Species of moth

Richia serano is a species of cutworm or dart moth in the family Noctuidae. It is found in North America.

The MONA or Hodges number for Richia serano is 10879.
