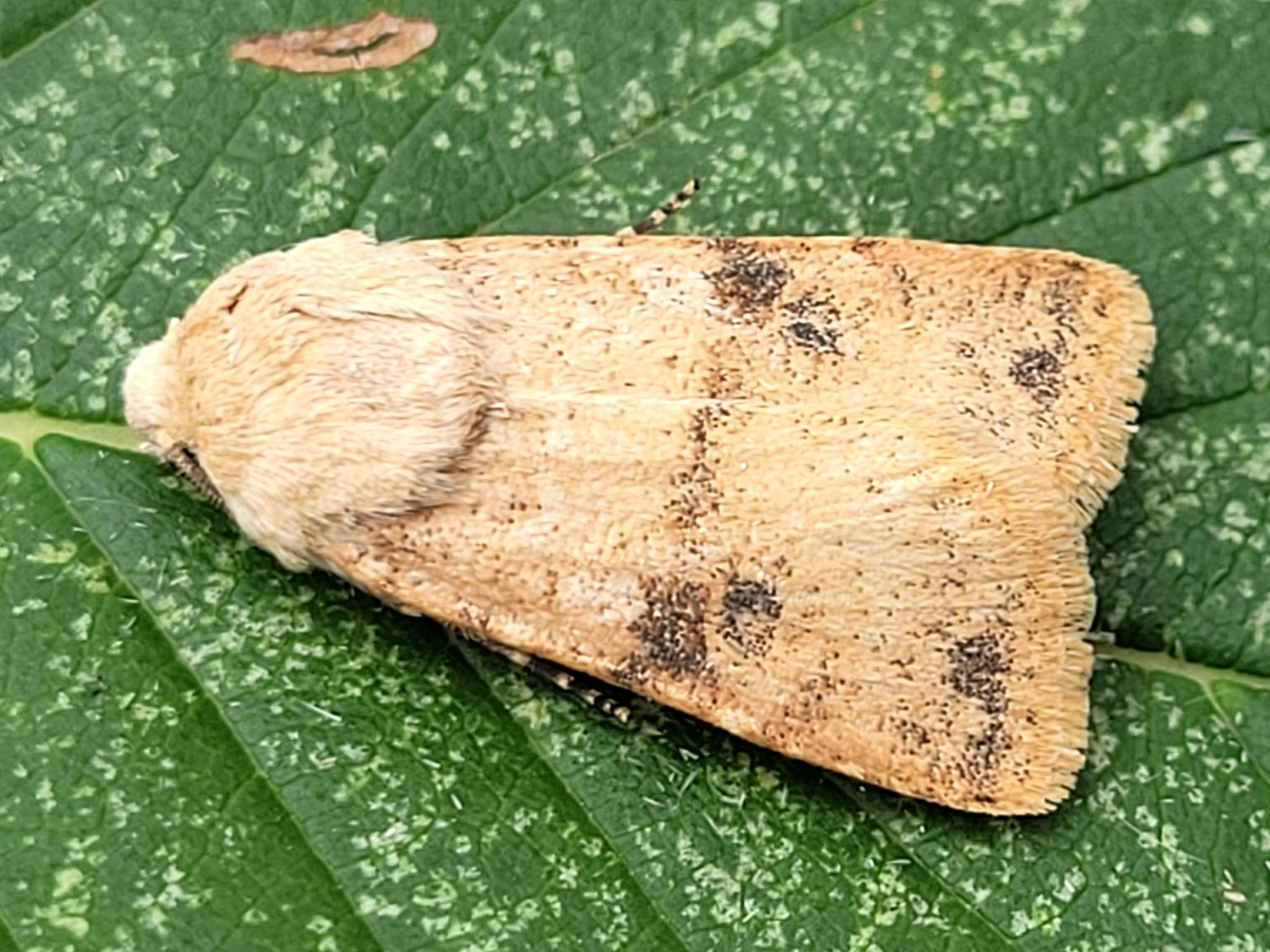

Scientific classification
- Domain: Eukaryota
- Kingdom: Animalia
- Phylum: Arthropoda
- Class: Insecta
- Order: Lepidoptera
- Superfamily: Noctuoidea
- Family: Noctuidae
- Tribe: Noctuini
- Subtribe: Agrotina
- Genus: Euxoa
- Species: E. teleboa

Binomial name
- Euxoa teleboa (Smith, 1890)

= Euxoa teleboa =

Species of moth

Euxoa teleboa is a species of cutworm or dart moth in the family Noctuidae. It is found in North America.
