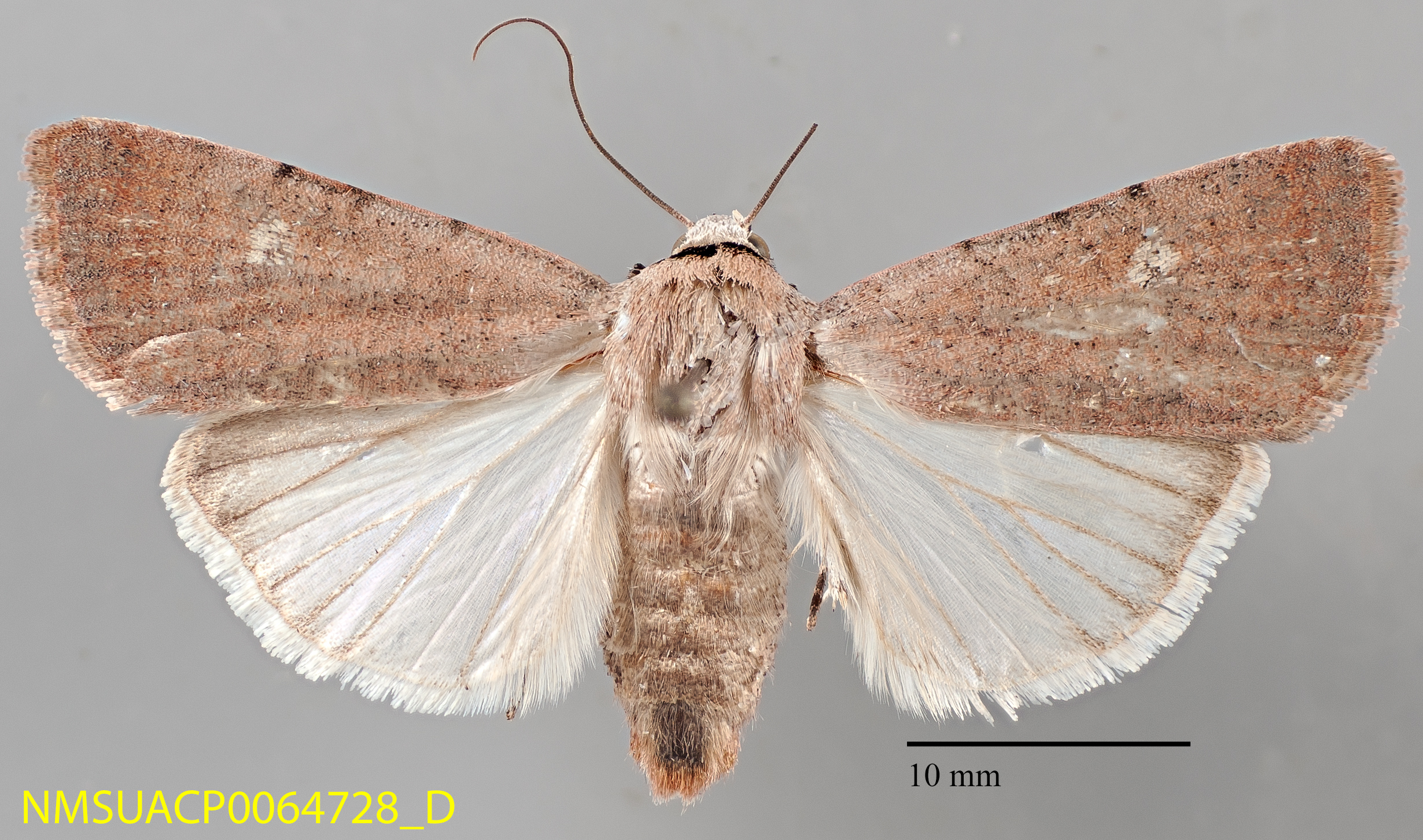

Scientific classification
- Kingdom: Animalia
- Phylum: Arthropoda
- Clade: Pancrustacea
- Class: Insecta
- Order: Lepidoptera
- Superfamily: Noctuoidea
- Family: Noctuidae
- Tribe: Noctuini
- Subtribe: Agrotina
- Genus: Anicla
- Species: A. biformata

Binomial name
- Anicla biformata Lafontaine, 2004

= Anicla biformata =

Species of moth

Anicla biformata is a species of cutworm or dart moth in the family Noctuidae. It is found in North America.
