= Cryptocala acadiensis =

Scientific classification
- Domain: Eukaryota
- Kingdom: Animalia
- Phylum: Arthropoda
- Class: Insecta
- Order: Lepidoptera
- Superfamily: Noctuoidea
- Family: Noctuidae
- Tribe: Noctuini
- Subtribe: Noctuina
- Genus: Cryptocala
- Species: C. acadiensis

Binomial name
- Cryptocala acadiensis (Bethune, 1870)

Species of moth

Cryptocala acadiensis, the catocaline dart, is a species of cutworm or dart moth in the family Noctuidae. It lives in North America.

The MONA or Hodges number for Cryptocala acadiensis is 11012.
