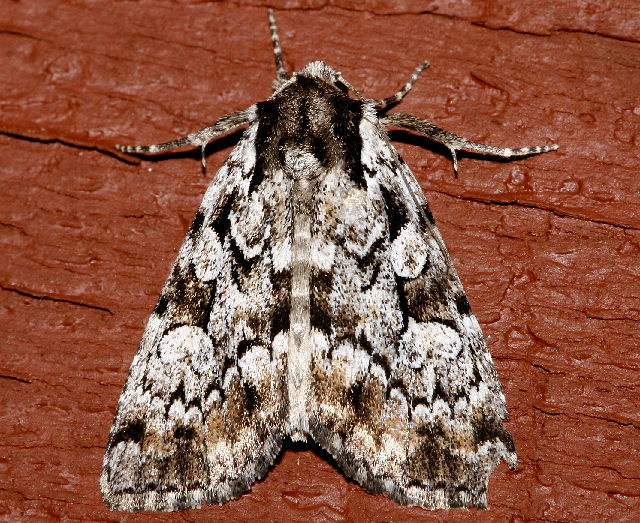
- Aplectoides condita

Scientific classification
- Domain: Eukaryota
- Kingdom: Animalia
- Phylum: Arthropoda
- Class: Insecta
- Order: Lepidoptera
- Superfamily: Noctuoidea
- Family: Noctuidae
- Tribe: Noctuini
- Genus: Aplectoides; Butler, 1878

= Aplectoides =

Genus of moths

Aplectoides is a genus of moths of the family Noctuidae.

== Species ==
- Aplectoides condita (Guenée, 1852)
