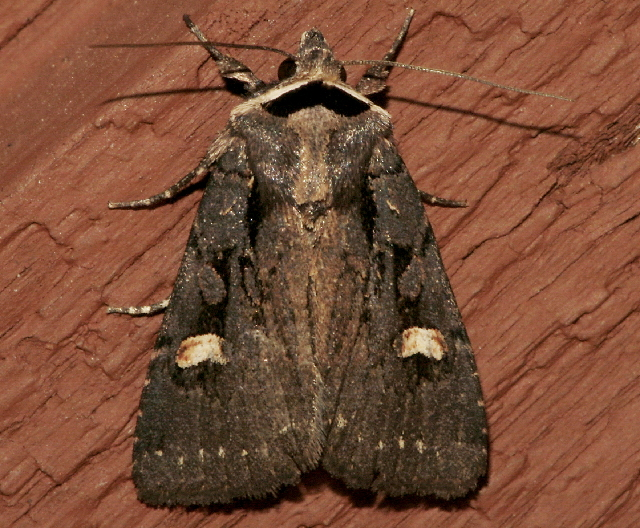

Scientific classification
- Kingdom: Animalia
- Phylum: Arthropoda
- Class: Insecta
- Order: Lepidoptera
- Superfamily: Noctuoidea
- Family: Noctuidae
- Genus: Adelphagrotis
- Species: A. indeterminata

Binomial name
- Adelphagrotis indeterminata Walker, 1865

Synonyms
- Xylina indeterminata; Agrotis washingtoniensis

= Adelphagrotis indeterminata =

Species of moth

Adelphagrotis indeterminata is a moth of the family Noctuidae. It is found from British Columbia to California.

The wingspan is 30–40 mm. Adults are usually on wing from August to October, but they have been recorded flying in May to July.

== Subspecies ==
- Adelphagrotis indeterminata indeterminata
- Adelphagrotis indeterminata innotablis
