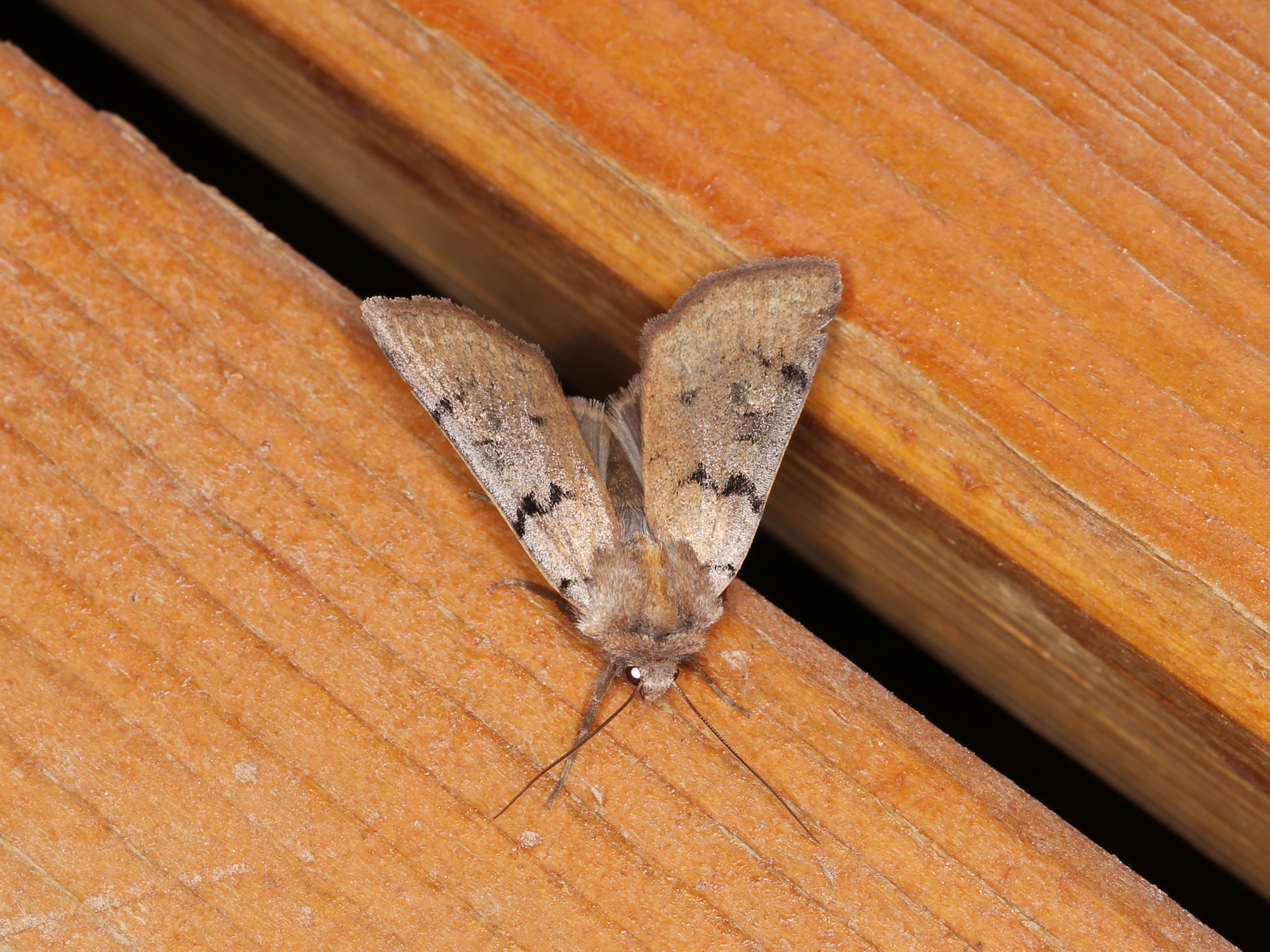

Scientific classification
- Kingdom: Animalia
- Phylum: Arthropoda
- Clade: Pancrustacea
- Class: Insecta
- Order: Lepidoptera
- Superfamily: Noctuoidea
- Family: Noctuidae
- Genus: Richia
- Species: R. parentalis

Binomial name
- Richia parentalis (Grote, 1879)

Synonyms
- Richia distichoides (Grote, 1883)

= Richia parentalis =

Species of moth

Richia parentalis is a species of cutworm or dart moth in the family Noctuidae. It is found in North America.
