= Anicla forbesi =

Scientific classification
- Domain: Eukaryota
- Kingdom: Animalia
- Phylum: Arthropoda
- Class: Insecta
- Order: Lepidoptera
- Superfamily: Noctuoidea
- Family: Noctuidae
- Genus: Anicla
- Species: A. forbesi

Binomial name
- Anicla forbesi (Franclemont, 1952)

Synonyms
- Euagrotis forbesi Franclemont, 1952

Species of moth

Anicla forbesi (Forbes' dart) is a moth of the family Noctuidae. It is found from Nova Scotia to western Ontario, south to northern Ohio and Pennsylvania, along the Appalachian Mountains to southwest Virginia and west to northern Michigan, central Wisconsin and northern Minnesota.

The wingspan is about 35 mm. Adults are on wing from June to August.

Larvae have been reared on Phleum pratense and probably feed on various other grasses in the wild.
