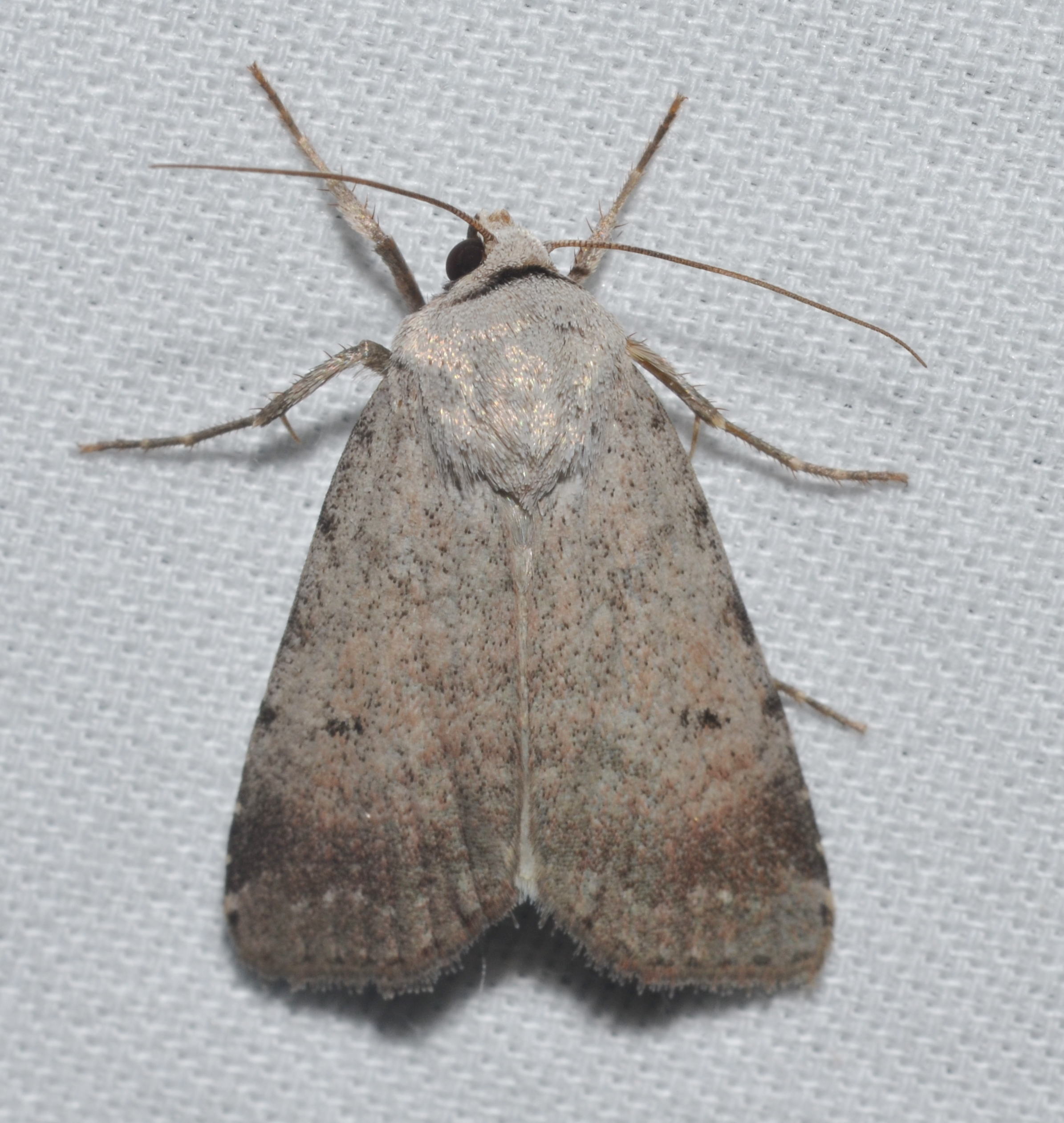

Scientific classification
- Kingdom: Animalia
- Phylum: Arthropoda
- Class: Insecta
- Order: Lepidoptera
- Superfamily: Noctuoidea
- Family: Noctuidae
- Genus: Anicla
- Species: A. lubricans

Binomial name
- Anicla lubricans (Guenée, 1852)

Synonyms
- Euagrotis lubricans (Guenée, 1852); Euagrotis associans (Walker, 1858); Euagrotis spreta (Smith, 1902)

= Anicla lubricans =

Species of moth

Anicla lubricans (slippery dart) is a moth of the family Noctuidae. It is found in the south-eastern part of the United States, ranging from North Carolina, south to Florida and west to eastern Texas.

The wingspan is about 35 mm. Adults are on wing year-round.
