= Euagrotis =

Scientific classification
- Kingdom: Animalia
- Phylum: Arthropoda
- Class: Insecta
- Order: Lepidoptera
- Superfamily: Noctuoidea
- Family: Noctuidae
- Subfamily: Noctuinae
- Genus: Euagrotis; McDunnough, 1929

Genus of moths

Euagrotis was a genus of moths of the family Noctuidae. It is now considered a subgenus of Anicla by Don Lafontaine et al. All species of Euagrotis were moved to Anicla.
