= Anicla beata =

Scientific classification
- Kingdom: Animalia
- Phylum: Arthropoda
- Clade: Pancrustacea
- Class: Insecta
- Order: Lepidoptera
- Superfamily: Noctuoidea
- Family: Noctuidae
- Genus: Anicla
- Species: A. beata

Binomial name
- Anicla beata (Grote, 1883)

Species of moth

Anicla beata is a species of cutworm or dart moth in the family Noctuidae.

The MONA or Hodges number for Anicla beata is 10904.
