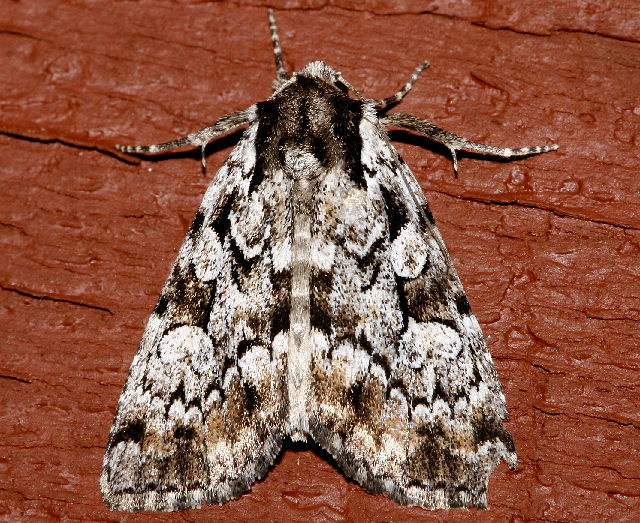

Scientific classification
- Kingdom: Animalia
- Phylum: Arthropoda
- Class: Insecta
- Order: Lepidoptera
- Superfamily: Noctuoidea
- Family: Noctuidae
- Genus: Aplectoides
- Species: A. condita

Binomial name
- Aplectoides condita (Guenée, 1852)

Synonyms
- Aplectoides trabalis (Grote, 1877)

= Aplectoides condita =

Species of moth

Aplectoides condita is a species of moth in the family Noctuidae. It is found across central and southern Canada from Newfoundland to British Columbia. In the east it occurs as far south as northern New Jersey and northern Pennsylvania, west to Michigan and Wisconsin. It is found along the Appalachians in Virginia and North Carolina. In the west it occurs in Idaho and Oregon. Recently it has also been recorded from Tennessee.

The wingspan is about 33 mm. Adults are on wing from May to July.

Larvae have been reared on Abies balsamea and Larix laricina. They seemed to prefer the latter.
