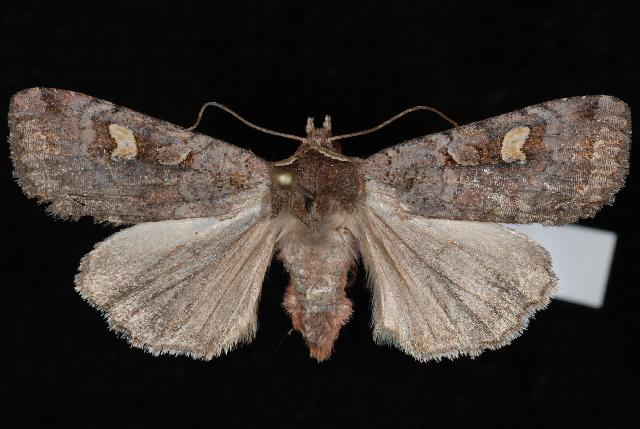
- Adelphagrotis stellaris

Scientific classification
- Domain: Eukaryota
- Kingdom: Animalia
- Phylum: Arthropoda
- Class: Insecta
- Order: Lepidoptera
- Superfamily: Noctuoidea
- Family: Noctuidae
- Tribe: Noctuini
- Genus: Adelphagrotis; Smith, 1890

= Adelphagrotis =

Genus of moths

Adelphagrotis is a genus of moths of the family Noctuidae.

== Species ==
- Adelphagrotis carissima (Harvey, 1875)
- Adelphagrotis indeterminata (Walker, 1865)
- Adelphagrotis stellaris (Grote, 1880)
