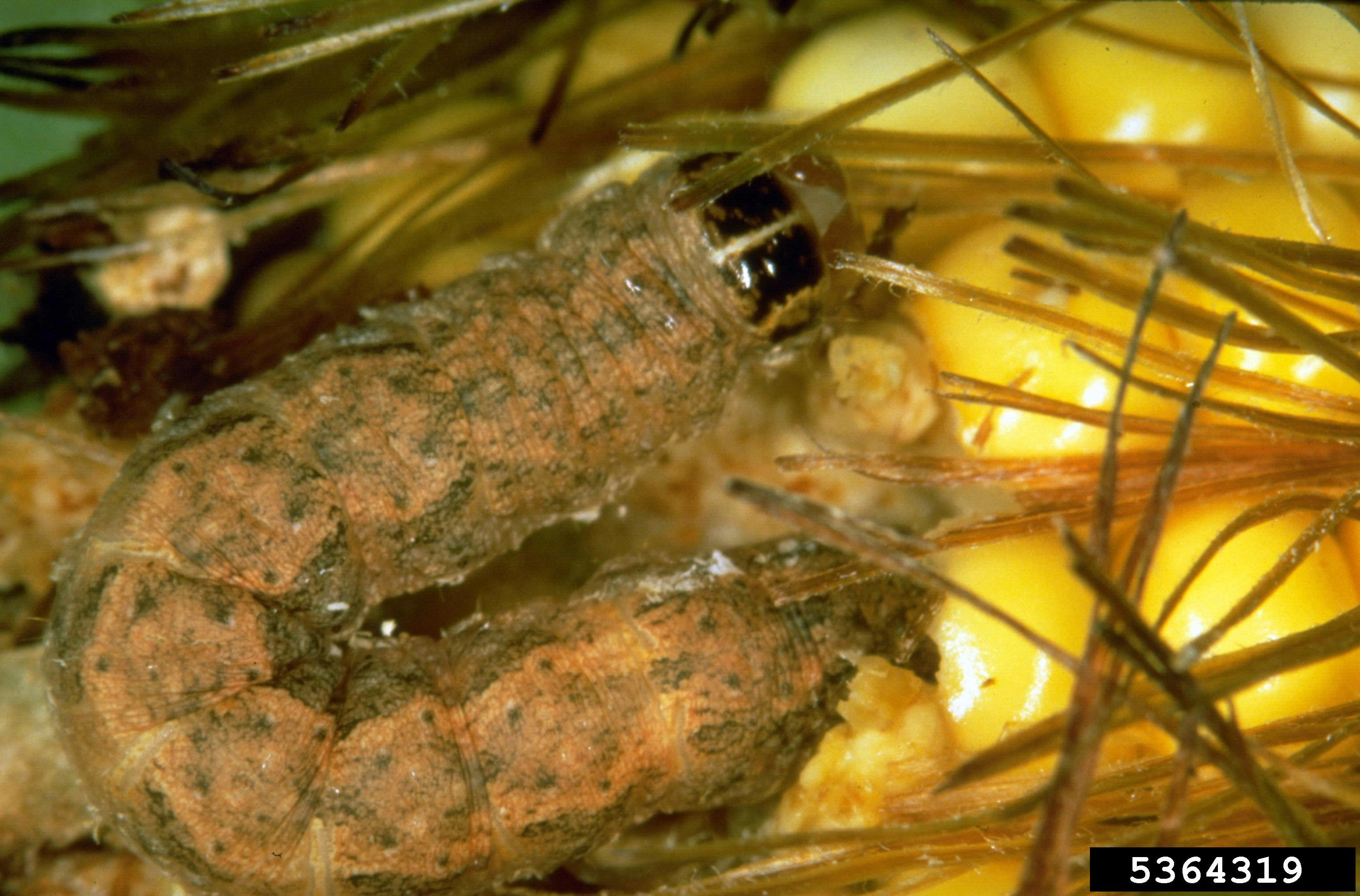

Scientific classification
- Kingdom: Animalia
- Phylum: Arthropoda
- Class: Insecta
- Order: Lepidoptera
- Superfamily: Noctuoidea
- Family: Noctuidae
- Genus: Striacosta
- Species: S. albicosta

Binomial name
- Striacosta albicosta Smith, 1888

Synonyms
- Richia albicosta; Loxagrotis albicosta

= Western bean cutworm =

Species of moth

The western bean cutworm (Striacosta albicosta) is a species of moth of the family Noctuidae and the only member of the genus Striacosta. It is endemic to the Western parts of the United States, but since 2000, the species has spread east through Iowa, Minnesota, Illinois, Missouri, Indiana, Wisconsin, Michigan and Ohio.

The wingspan is about 40 mm. The moth flies from July to August depending on the location.

The larvae feed on a wide variety of plants, including beans and corn, on which it is considered a pest.
