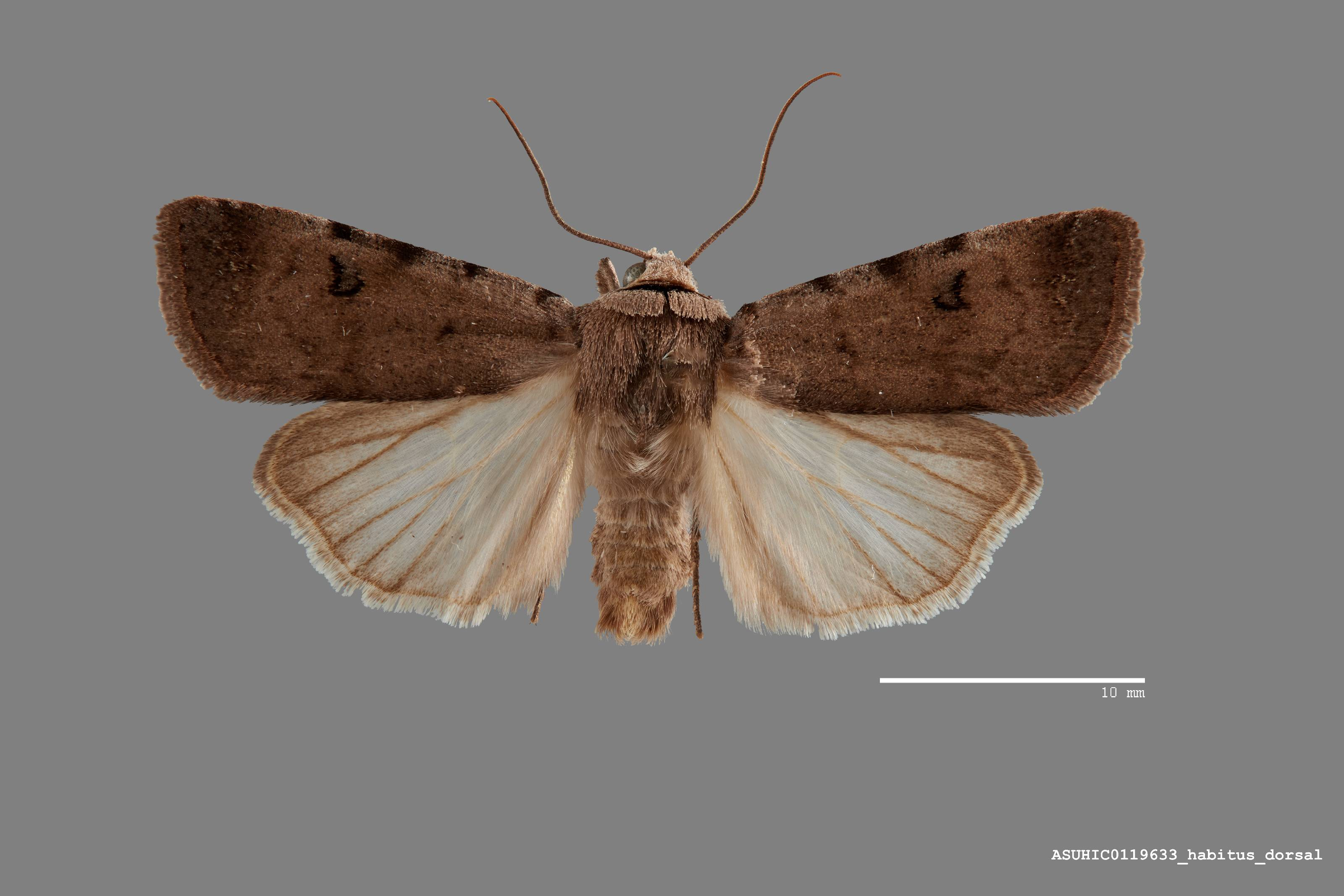

Scientific classification
- Domain: Eukaryota
- Kingdom: Animalia
- Phylum: Arthropoda
- Class: Insecta
- Order: Lepidoptera
- Superfamily: Noctuoidea
- Family: Noctuidae
- Genus: Anicla
- Species: A. exuberans

Binomial name
- Anicla exuberans J. B. Smith, 1898

Synonyms
- Euagrotis exuberans; Anicla bairdii (J. B. Smith, 1908)

= Anicla exuberans =

Species of moth

Anicla exuberans is a moth of the family Noctuidae first described by John Bernhardt Smith in 1898. It is found in North America from central Mexico north to the dry interior of southern British Columbia, southern Alberta and south-western Saskatchewan.

The wingspan is 37–41 mm. Adults are on wing from June to August depending on the location. There is one generation per year.
