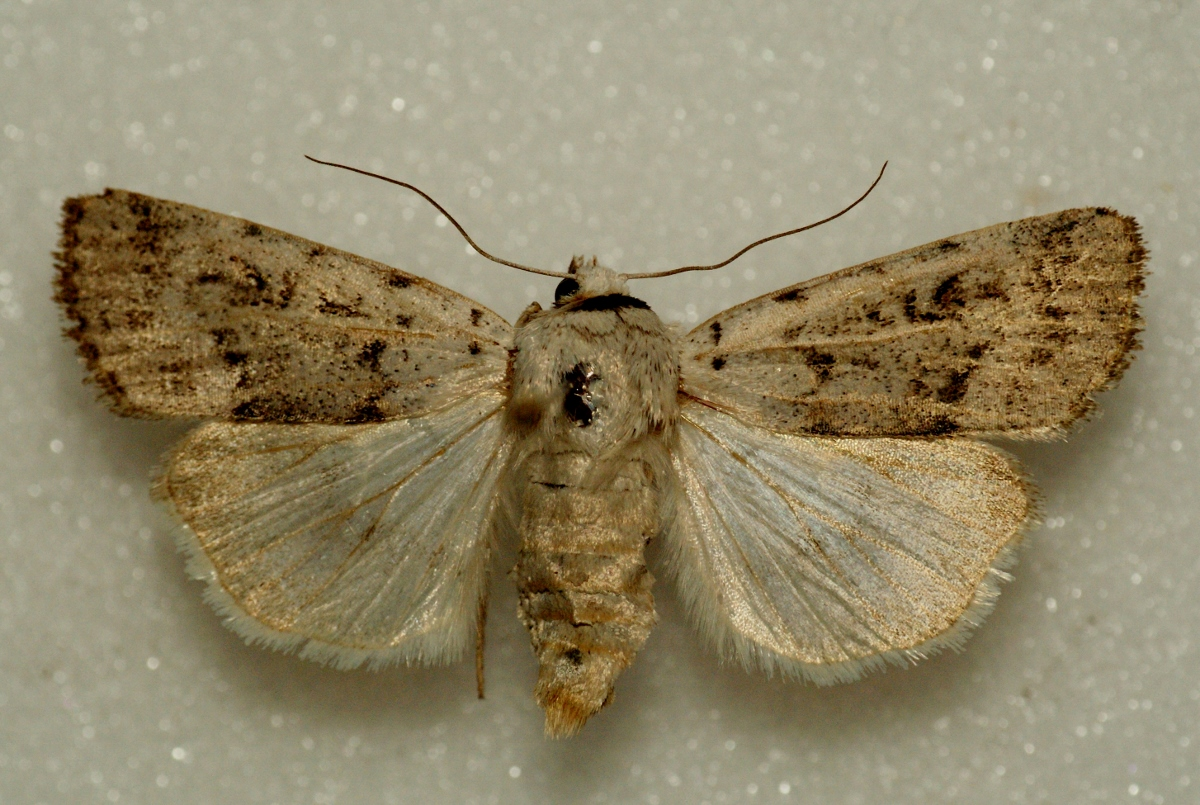

Scientific classification
- Domain: Eukaryota
- Kingdom: Animalia
- Phylum: Arthropoda
- Class: Insecta
- Order: Lepidoptera
- Superfamily: Noctuoidea
- Family: Noctuidae
- Genus: Anicla
- Species: A. tepperi

Binomial name
- Anicla tepperi Smith, 1888

Synonyms
- Euagrotis tepperi; Euagrotis atricincta

= Anicla tepperi =

Species of moth

Anicla tepperi is a species of moth in the family Noctuidae that was first described by Smith in 1888. It is found in North America from eastern Manitoba west to the Alberta foothills, north to about Lloydminster and south to southern Colorado.

The wingspan is 36–40 mm. Adults are on wing from June to July depending on the location. There is one generation per year.

The larvae feed on grasses of the family Poaceae.
