= Richia herculeana =

Scientific classification
- Domain: Eukaryota
- Kingdom: Animalia
- Phylum: Arthropoda
- Class: Insecta
- Order: Lepidoptera
- Superfamily: Noctuoidea
- Family: Noctuidae
- Genus: Richia
- Species: R. herculeana

Binomial name
- Richia herculeana (Schaus, 1898)

Species of moth

Richia herculeana is a species of cutworm or dart moth in the family Noctuidae. It is found in North America.

The MONA or Hodges number for Richia herculeana is 10879.1.
