= Adelphagrotis carissima =

Scientific classification
- Domain: Eukaryota
- Kingdom: Animalia
- Phylum: Arthropoda
- Class: Insecta
- Order: Lepidoptera
- Superfamily: Noctuoidea
- Family: Noctuidae
- Genus: Adelphagrotis
- Species: A. carissima

Binomial name
- Adelphagrotis carissima Harvey, 1875

Species of moth

Adelphagrotis carissima is a moth of the family Noctuidae. It is found in North America, including California.
