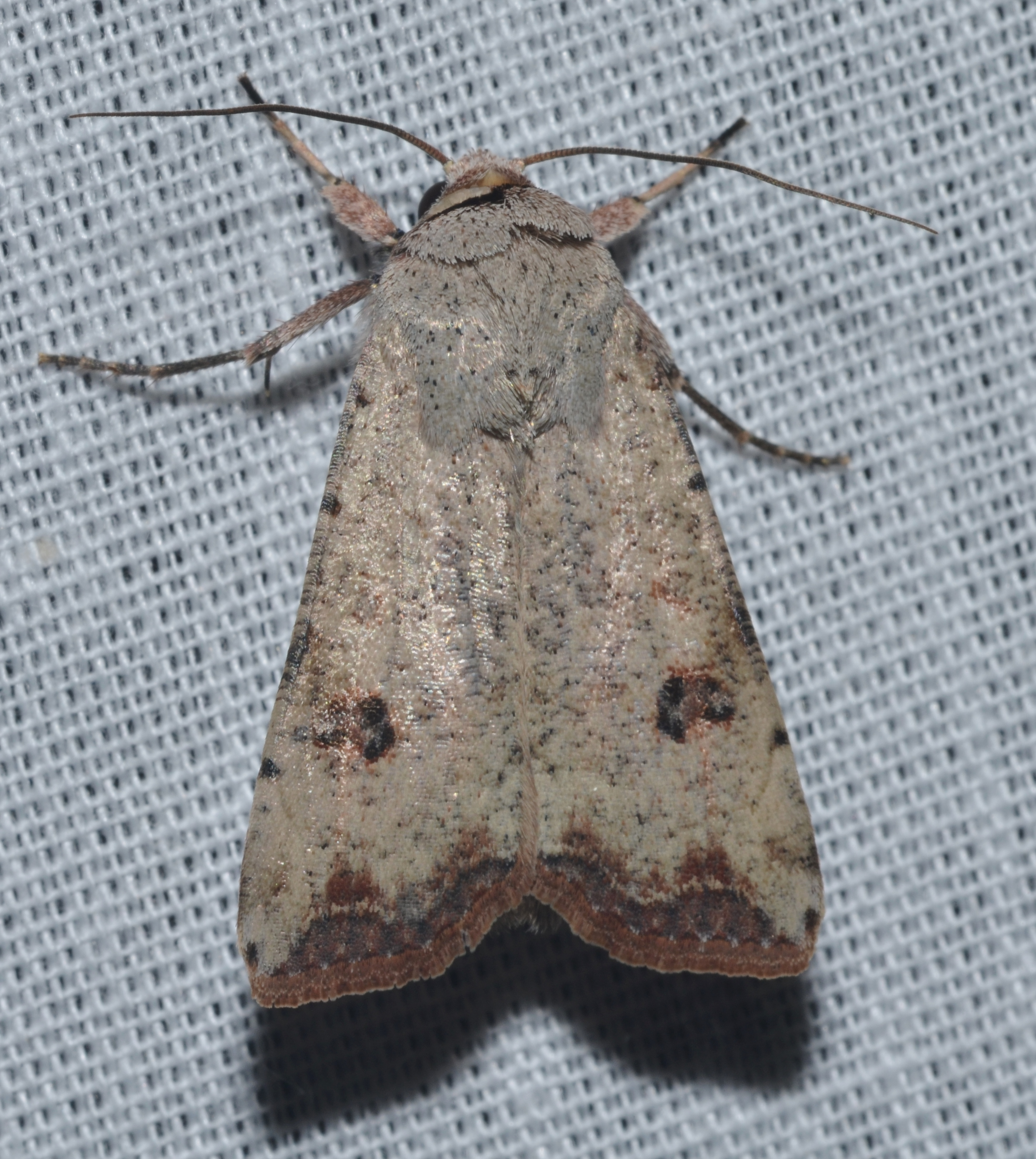

Scientific classification
- Kingdom: Animalia
- Phylum: Arthropoda
- Class: Insecta
- Order: Lepidoptera
- Superfamily: Noctuoidea
- Family: Noctuidae
- Genus: Anicla
- Species: A. infecta

Binomial name
- Anicla infecta Ochsenheimer, 1816

Synonyms
- Agrotis infecta; Agrotis incivis; Agrotis praecipua; Agrotis bartolemica; Nicla alabamae; Nicla pauper; Nicla incisa; Nicla mulina; Anicla mahalpa

= Anicla infecta =

Species of moth

Anicla infecta is a moth of the family Noctuidae, described by Ochsenheimer in 1816. It is known as the green cutworm when a caterpillar and the green cutworm moth when mature. It is found from south-eastern Canada (Nova Scotia and Quebec) through the eastern United States and until Uruguay.

The wingspan is 30–35 mm. Adults are on wing from June to September depending on the location.

The larvae feed on beets, grasses and tobacco. Adults are a pollinator of fetterbush lyonia.
