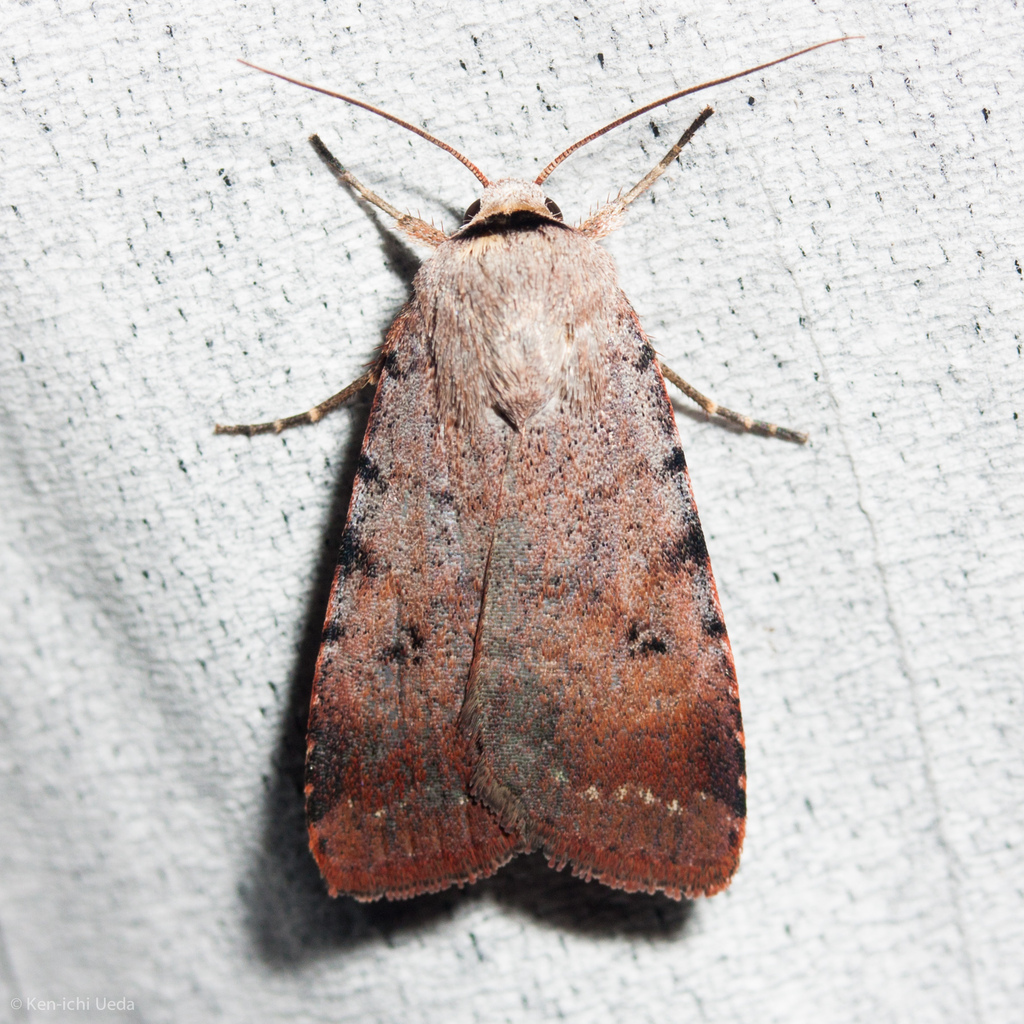

Scientific classification
- Kingdom: Animalia
- Phylum: Arthropoda
- Class: Insecta
- Order: Lepidoptera
- Superfamily: Noctuoidea
- Family: Noctuidae
- Genus: Anicla
- Species: A. illapsa

Binomial name
- Anicla illapsa (Walker, 1857)

Synonyms
- Euagrotis illapsa (Walker, 1857)

= Anicla illapsa =

Snowy dart

Species of moth

Anicla illapsa (snowy dart) is a moth of the family Noctuidae. It is found from New Brunswick to Florida, west to Texas, Nebraska and Ontario.

The wingspan is 29–35 mm. Adults are on wing from May to October. There are two generations per year.

Larvae have been reared on Phleum pratense and probably feed on various other grasses in the wild.
