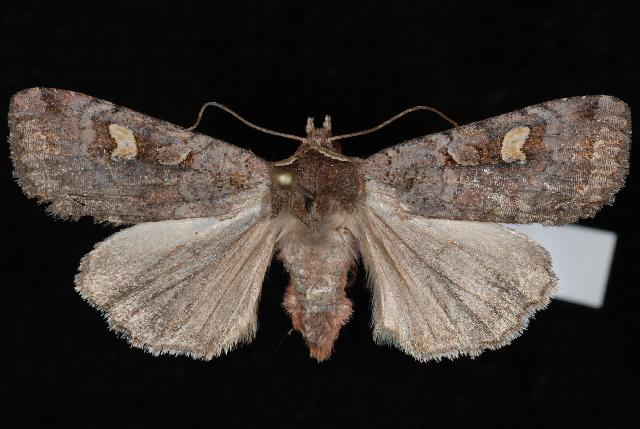
- ADELPHAHGROTIS STELLARIS

Scientific classification
- Domain: Eukaryota
- Kingdom: Animalia
- Phylum: Arthropoda
- Class: Insecta
- Order: Lepidoptera
- Superfamily: Noctuoidea
- Family: Noctuidae
- Genus: Adelphagrotis
- Species: A. stellaris

Binomial name
- Adelphagrotis stellaris Grote, 1880

Synonyms
- Agrotis stellaris; Adelphagrotis quarta

= Adelphagrotis stellaris =

Species of moth

Adelphagrotis stellaris is a moth of the family Noctuidae. It is found along the West Coast from southern British Columbia east to the Cascades in the north and southward to the central California Coast Range.

The wingspan is about 36 mm. Adults are on wing from July to August.

The larvae feed on a wide range of flowering trees and shrubs, including Vaccinium, Symphoricarpos, Rubus spectabilis and Oemleria cerasiformis.
