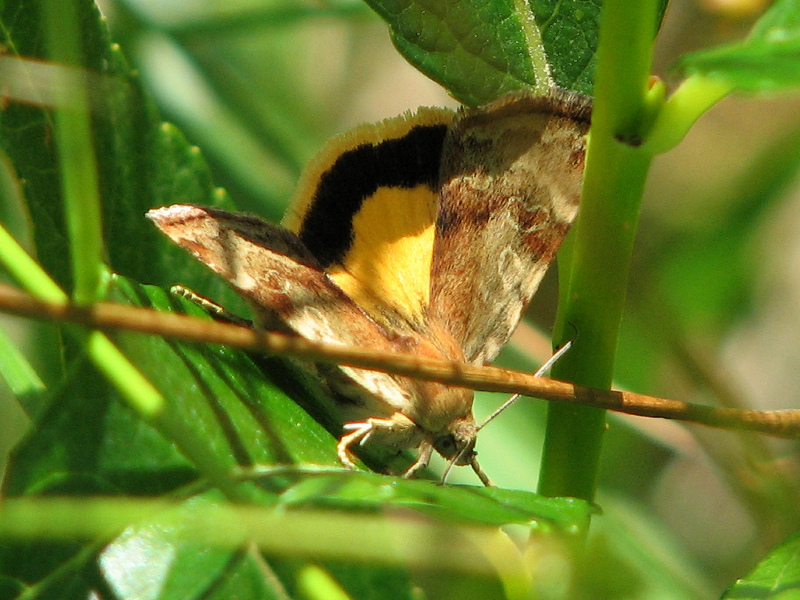

Scientific classification
- Domain: Eukaryota
- Kingdom: Animalia
- Phylum: Arthropoda
- Class: Insecta
- Order: Lepidoptera
- Superfamily: Noctuoidea
- Family: Noctuidae
- Genus: Cryptocala
- Species: C. chardinyi

Binomial name
- Cryptocala chardinyi (Boisduval, 1829)

Synonyms
- Rhyncagrotis chardinyi; Anarta chardinyi Boisduval, 1829; Cryptocala hetaera Eversmann, 1837; Cryptocala fuchsii Wendlandt, 1901; Cryptocala chardinyi f. brunnea Zöllner, 1920; Cryptocala chardinyi f. albida Zöllner, 1920; Cryptocala chardinyi f. melanos Zöllner, 1920; Cryptocala chardinyi f. rubra Zöllner, 1920; Cryptocala chardinyi f. babylonica von Schultz, 1921; Cryptocala chardinyi f. weissi du Bois, 1924

= Cryptocala chardinyi =

Species of moth

Cryptocala chardinyi is a species of moth of the family Noctuidae. It is found in southern Finland, Estonia, Latvia and Lithuania, the Altai Mountains, from the Sayan Mountains to the Amur region, Turkmenistan, Mongolia and China.

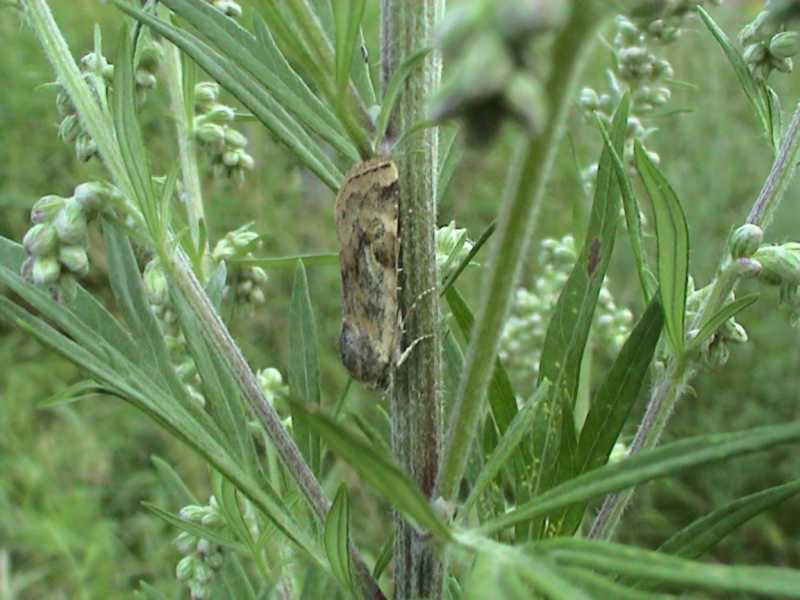

The wingspan is 25–30 mm. Adults are on wing from the second half of June to the first half of August.

The larvae probably feed on Rumex species.
