= Anicla digna =

Scientific classification
- Domain: Eukaryota
- Kingdom: Animalia
- Phylum: Arthropoda
- Class: Insecta
- Order: Lepidoptera
- Superfamily: Noctuoidea
- Family: Noctuidae
- Genus: Anicla
- Species: A. digna

Binomial name
- Anicla digna Morrison, 1875

Synonyms
- Euagrotis digna; Euagrotis nigrovittata

Species of moth

Anicla digna is a moth of the family Noctuidae. It is found in North America, including Texas and South Carolina.

The wingspan is about 30 mm.
