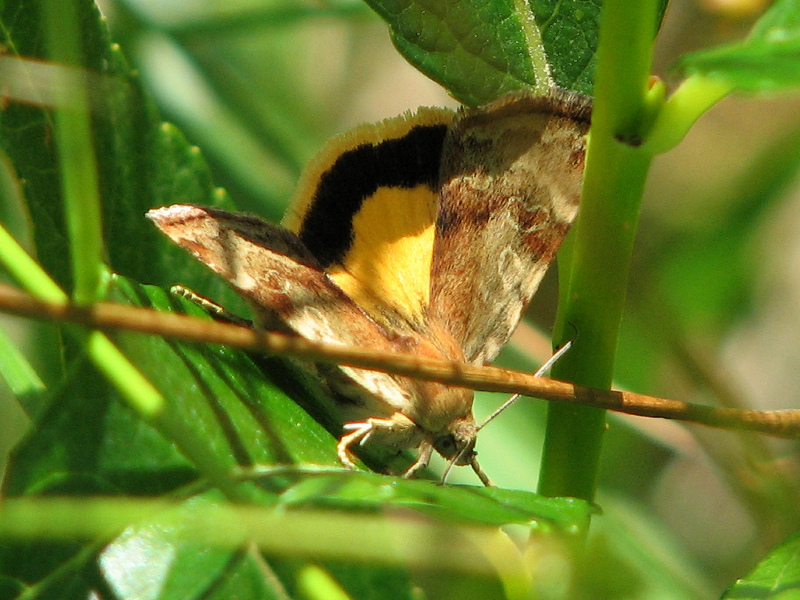
- Cryptocala chardinyi

Scientific classification
- Kingdom: Animalia
- Phylum: Arthropoda
- Clade: Pancrustacea
- Class: Insecta
- Order: Lepidoptera
- Superfamily: Noctuoidea
- Family: Noctuidae
- Subtribe: Noctuina
- Genus: Cryptocala; Benjamin, 1921

= Cryptocala =

Genus of moths

Cryptocala is a genus of moths of the family Noctuidae.

== Species ==
- Cryptocala acadiensis (Bethune, 1870)
- Cryptocala chardinyi (Boisduval, 1829)
