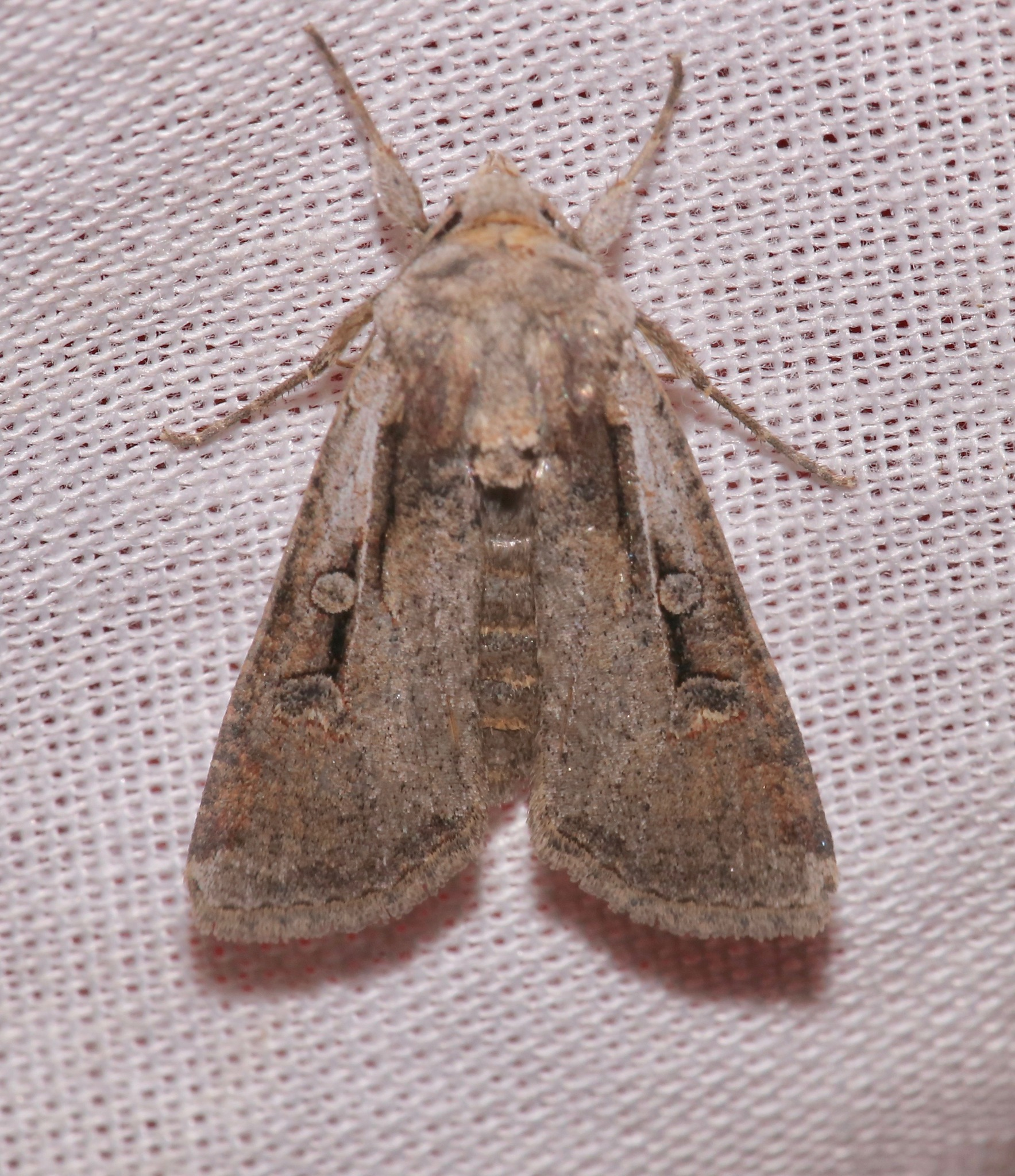
- Hemieuxoa rudens

Scientific classification
- Domain: Eukaryota
- Kingdom: Animalia
- Phylum: Arthropoda
- Class: Insecta
- Order: Lepidoptera
- Superfamily: Noctuoidea
- Family: Noctuidae
- Subtribe: Agrotina
- Genus: Hemieuxoa; McDunnough, 1929

= Hemieuxoa =

Genus of moths

Hemieuxoa is a genus of moths of the family Noctuidae.

== Species ==
The following species are recognised in the genus Hemieuxoa:

- Hemieuxoa butleri (Schaus, 1898)
- Hemieuxoa conchidia (Butler, 1882)
- Hemieuxoa interrupta (Maassen, 1890)
- Hemieuxoa nezia (Schaus, 1911)
- Hemieuxoa polymorpha (Forbes, 1933)
- Hemieuxoa rudens (Harvey, 1874)
