= Striacosta =

Scientific classification
- Kingdom: Animalia
- Phylum: Arthropoda
- Clade: Pancrustacea
- Class: Insecta
- Order: Lepidoptera
- Superfamily: Noctuoidea
- Family: Noctuidae
- Genus: Striacosta

Synonyms
- Richia; Loxagrotis

Genus of moths

Striacosta is a genus of insect, belonging to the family Noctuidae. It contains only one species, Striacosta albicosta, which is found in North America.
