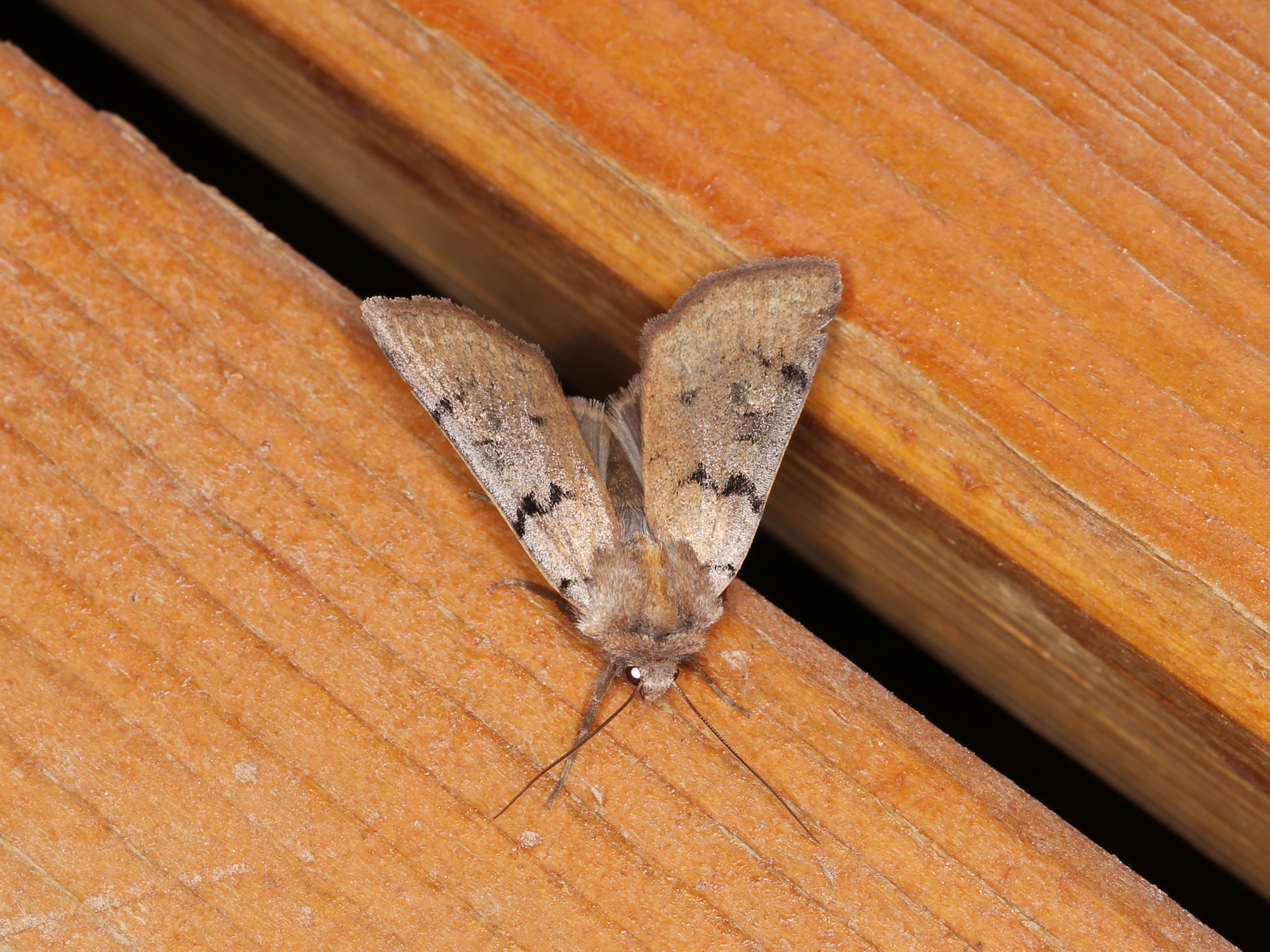
- Richia parentalis

Scientific classification
- Kingdom: Animalia
- Phylum: Arthropoda
- Class: Insecta
- Order: Lepidoptera
- Superfamily: Noctuoidea
- Family: Noctuidae
- Subtribe: Agrotina
- Genus: Richia; Grote, 1887

= Richia =

Genus of moths

Richia is a genus of moths of the family Noctuidae.

== Species ==
- Richia chortalis (Harvey, 1875)
- Richia cyminopristes (Dyar, 1912)
- Richia hahama (Dyar, 1919)
- Richia herculeana (Schaus, 1898)
- Richia larga (J.B. Smith, 1908)
- Richia lobato (Barnes, 1904)
- Richia madida (Guenée, 1852)
- Richia parentalis (Grote, 1879) (syn: Richia distichoides (Grote, 1883))
- Richia praefixa Morrison, 1875 (syn: Richia docilis (Grote, 1881), formerly Eurois praefixa)
- Richia pyrsogramma (Dyar, 1916)
- Richia serano (Smith, 1910)
- Richia triphaenoides (Dyar, 1912)
