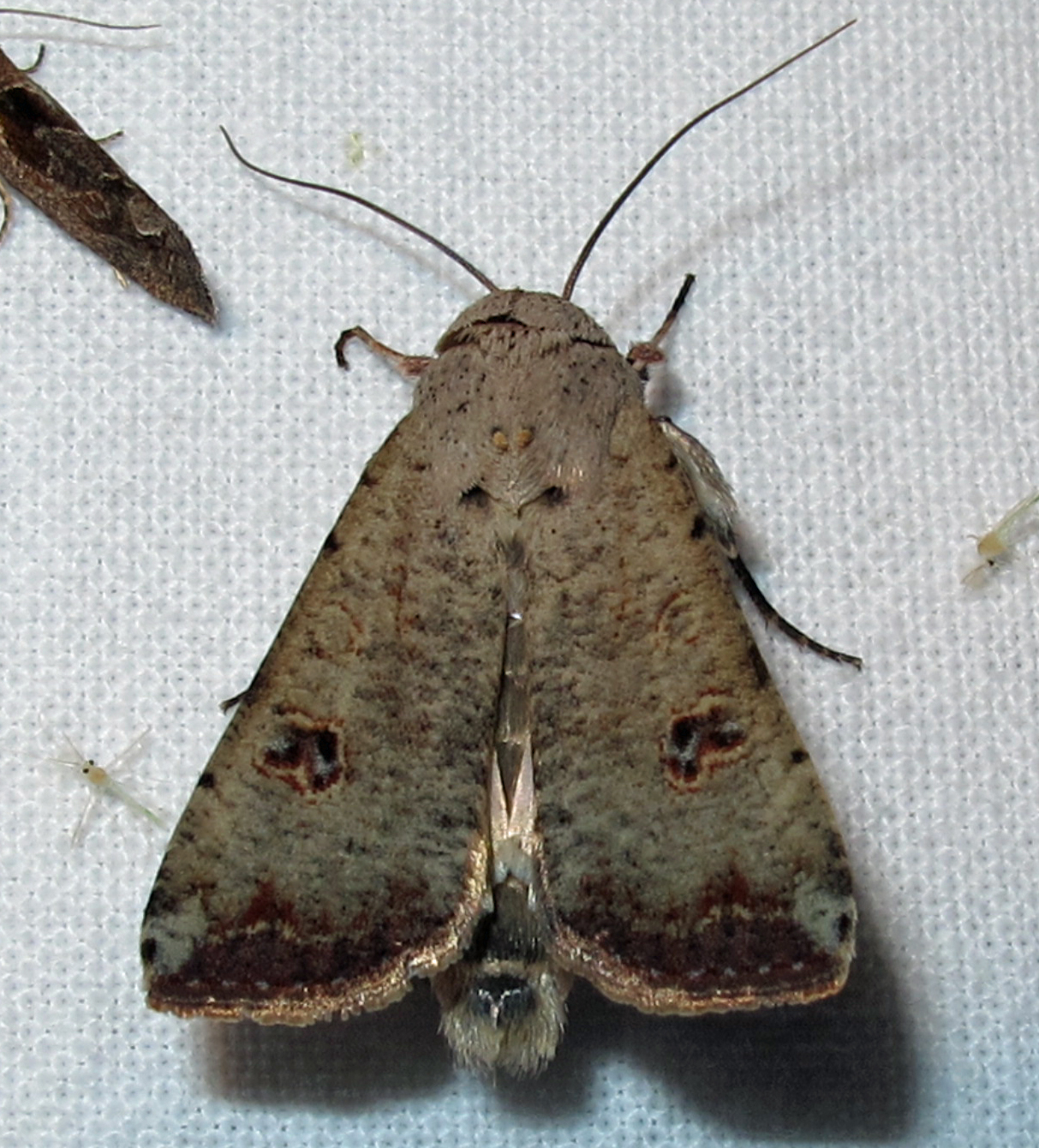
- Anicla infecta

Scientific classification
- Kingdom: Animalia
- Phylum: Arthropoda
- Class: Insecta
- Order: Lepidoptera
- Superfamily: Noctuoidea
- Family: Noctuidae
- Subtribe: Agrotina
- Genus: Anicla; Grote, 1874

= Anicla =

Genus of moths

Anicla is a genus of moths of the family Noctuidae.

== Species ==
- Subgenus Anicla
  - Anicla cemolia Franclemont, 1967
  - Anicla ignicans (Guenée, 1852)
  - Anicla infecta (Ochsenheimer, 1816)
  - Anicla ornea (Druce, 1889)
- Subgenus Euagrotis (formerly a separate genus)
  - Anicla bairdii (J.B. Smith, 1908)
  - Anicla beata (Grote, 1883)
  - Anicla digna (Morrison, 1875)
  - Anicla exuberans (J. B. Smith, 1898)
  - Anicla forbesi (Franclemont, 1952)
  - Anicla illapsa (Walker, 1857)
  - Anicla lubricans (Guenée, 1852)
  - Anicla simplicia (Morrison, 1875)
  - Anicla tenuescens (Smith, 1890)
  - Anicla tepperi (Smith, 1888)
- Subgenus unknown
  - Anicla biformata Lafontaine, 2004
  - Anicla espoetia (Dyar, 1910)
  - Anicla mus Lafontaine, 2004
  - Anicla sullivani Lafontaine, 2004
