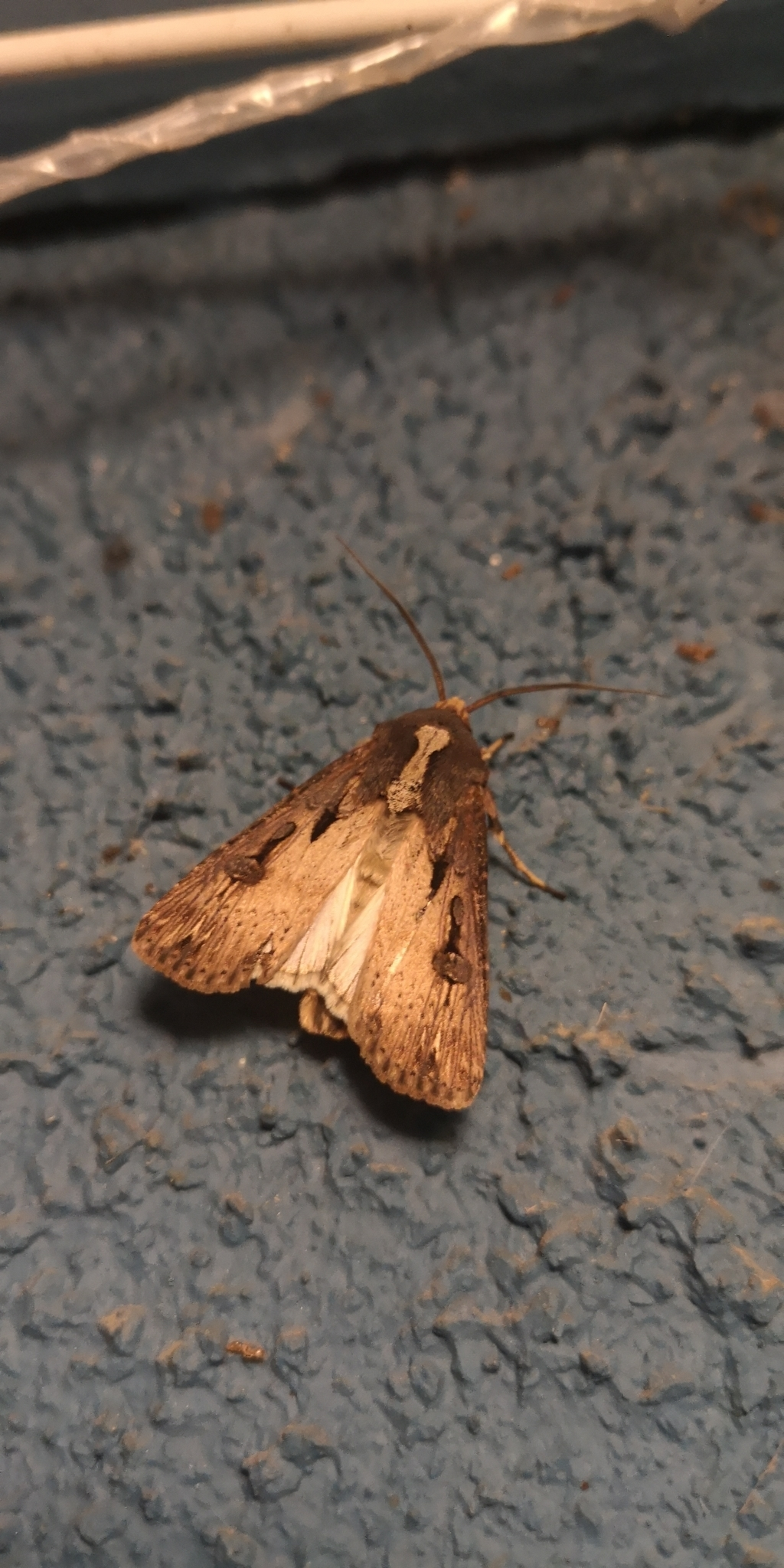
- Agrotis robusta in Melipilla, Chile

Scientific classification
- Kingdom: Animalia
- Phylum: Arthropoda
- Clade: Pancrustacea
- Class: Insecta
- Order: Lepidoptera
- Superfamily: Noctuoidea
- Family: Noctuidae
- Subfamily: Noctuinae
- Tribe: Noctuini

Subtribes
- Agrotina; Noctuina

Synonyms
- Agrotini Rambur, 1848

= Noctuini =

Tribe of moths

Noctuini is a tribe of owlet moths in the family Noctuidae. There are at least 520 described species in Noctuini.

== Noctuini genera ==
- Abagrotis Smith, 1890
- Actebia Stephens, 1829
- Adelphagrotis Smith, 1890
- Agnorisma Lafontaine, 1998
- Agrotis Ochsenheimer, 1816
- Anaplectoides McDunnough, 1929
- Anicla Grote, 1874
- Aplectoides Butler, 1878
- Cerastis Ochsenheimer, 1816
- Chersotis Boisduval, 1840
- Choephora Grote & Robinson, 1868
- Coenophila Stephens, 1850
- Copablepharon Harvey, 1878
- Cryptocala Benjamin, 1921
- Diarsia Hübner, 1821
- Dichagyris Lederer, 1857
- Eucoptocnemis Grote, 1874
- Eueretagrotis Smith, 1890
- Eurois Hübner, 1821
- Euxoa Hübner, 1821
- Feltia Walker, 1856
- Graphiphora Ochsenheimer, 1816
- Hemieuxoa McDunnough, 1929
- Hemipachnobia McDunnough, 1929
- Isochlora Staudinger, 1882
- Lycophotia Hübner, 1821
- Noctua Linnaeus, 1758 (yellow underwings)
- Ochropleura Hübner, 1821
- Parabagrotis Lafontaine, 1998
- Parabarrovia Gibson, 1920
- Paradiarsia McDunnough, 1929
- Peridroma Hübner, 1821
- Prognorisma Lafontaine, 1998
- Pronoctua Smith, 1894
- Protogygia McDunnough, 1929
- Protolampra McDunnough, 1929
- Pseudohermonassa Varga in Varga, Ronkay & Yela, 1990
- Rhyacia Hübner, 1821
- Richia Grote, 1887
- Setagrotis Smith, 1890
- Spaelotis Boisduval, 1840
- Striacosta Lafontaine, 2004
- Tesagrotis Lafontaine, 1998
- Xestia Hübner, 1818
