= Stacy Lyn Harris =

Author, blogger, and TV co-host

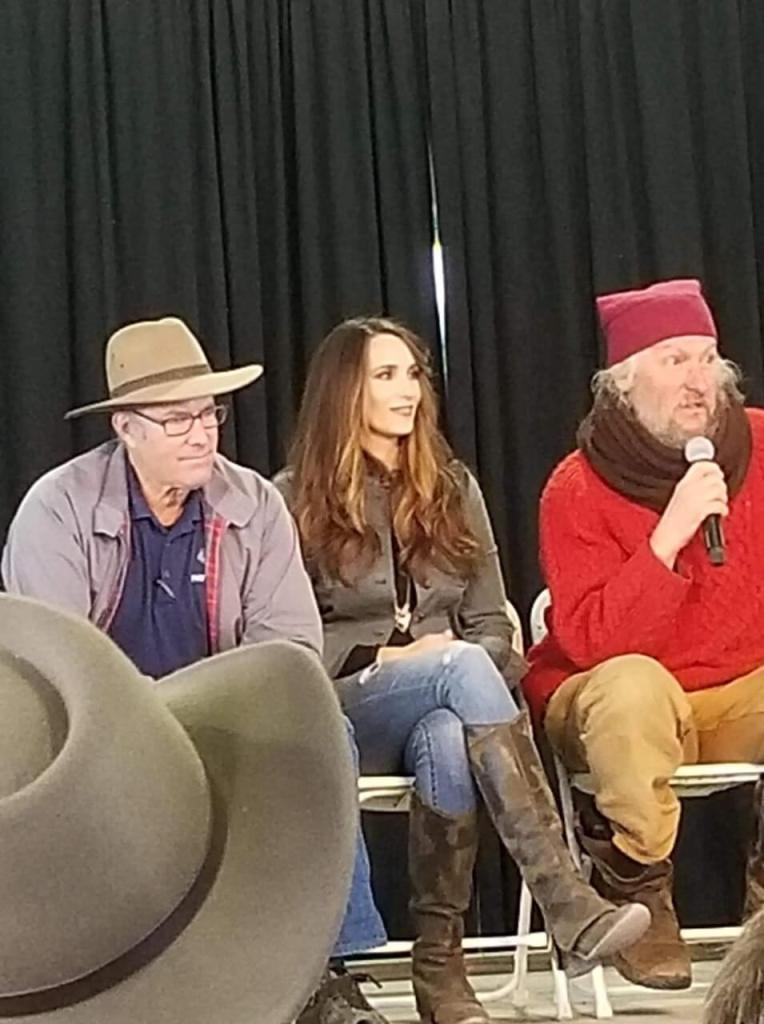
Harris participating in the Q&A panel at the 2018 Homesteader's of America Conference with Joel Salatin and Eustace Conway.

Stacy Lyn Harris is an American cookbook author, blogger, television host, gardener, and public speaker. Harris has been recognized for espousing a modern approach to living off the land. Her books include Happy Healthy Family Tracking the Outdoors In, Stacy Lyn's Harvest Cookbook and the handbook, Preserving 101: Canning, Freezing & Drying. Southern Living magazine editors placed the Harvest Cookbook on one of their "Editor's Choice Cookbook of the Week" lists. In 2014, she was named as part of a "new breed of cooks" helping to reintroduce wild game cooking into the mainstream by Deer and Deer Hunting magazine, alongside other notable chefs Steven Rinella, Charlie Palmer, and Hank Shaw.

== Biography ==
Harris was born in Montgomery, Alabama to Wayne Pilgreen, a Vietnam veteran and Alabama Power Company linesman, and Paula Johnson, who worked for the United States Postal Service. She grew up in Montgomery, Alabama and attended Jefferson Davis High School.

She graduated from Auburn University at Montgomery, where she majored in Psychology. She continued her education into the study of law and attended Jones Law School at Faulkner University in Montgomery, Alabama, and received her degree in 1994.

After passing the Alabama State Bar exam, both she and her husband relocated to Birmingham, Alabama. During this transitional period, she began cultivating her interest in sustainable living. As time passed and her family grew, she continued to refine and expand her expertise in the culinary arts.

== Media ==
Stacy Lyn has authored two award-winning cookbooks: Happy Health Family Tracking the Outdoors In and Stacy Lyn's Harvest Cookbook, both of which reached #1 on Amazon's list of Best New Releases. In 2013, Stacy authored Recipes and Tips for Sustainable Living and in 2018, Preserving 101: Canning, Freezing & Drying. Her writing can be found in many nationwide magazines and publications, such as Southern Living, Backwoodsman Magazine, Art of Manliness, Grit magazine, and The New Pioneer magazine, and others.

Harris was the first woman to appear on the cover of Backwoodsmen Magazine and also appeared on the Spring 2019 cover of The New Pioneer Magazine, sharing her perspective on modern country living. In 2018, she wrote a feature article in Where Women Cook magazine, where she talked about the experiences that led her to adopting a sustainable lifestyle while growing up in the deep South. This was followed up by another article in the 2020 issue of Covey Rise, an upscale Southern lifestyle magazine. Harris shared her venison recipes, and in a brief interview recounted her various influences in the areas of design and style. Harris's recipes have been featured in many other outlets, most recently in Entertain and Celebrate.

Harris has been interviewed by international publications such as Huffington Post. She has also been interviewed locally by the Montgomery Advertiser Newspaper where she discussed the merits of sustainable living and the positive impact that it has had on her and her family.

=== Television ===
She is a regular co-host on a variety of networks. On RFD-TV, she hosts cooking and gardening segments on Rural Heritage. In 2013, she began regularly appearing as a cast member on The Sporting Chef, a Sportsman Channel production. In this time, Harris has also made guest appearances on the Deer & Deer Hunting television show.

In October 2022, Harris became the new host of The Sporting Chef, taking over for the show's original host Scott Leysath. This made Harris the only female host in the prime time block of cooking shows on the Outdoor Channel, dubbed the Taste of the Wild lineup. Other Taste of the Wild show hosts include Andrew Zimmern, Steven Rinella, Mike Robinson, Mario Kapou, and Nick Hoffman.

Stacy has been a regular guest on the Global Network, TBN and Daystar TV

She appeared as a guest on The Joni Lamb Show.

=== Other works ===
Harris maintains a personal website and blog with a focus on sustainable living tips and recollections from her personal life. Her website also houses a large collection of original recipes.

Harris was a featured speaker at Country Living Magazine Live Event. She also gave presentations at the Southeastern Outdoor Press Association (SEOPA) annual conference and the Homesteaders of America Conference in 2018.

Harris was invited to be a headliner at the Lehman's Country Living Workshop in 2019, along with Joel Salatin.

== Personal life ==
In 1993 she married Scott Harris DMD, Family and Cosmetic Dentistry specialist.

== Books ==
- Happy Healthy Family: Tracking the Outdoors In, ISBN 978-0-9838799-1-6
- Stacy Lyn's Harvest Cookbook, ISBN 978-0-9838799-3-0
- Preserving 101: Canning, Freezing, and Drying, ISBN 978-0-983879947
- Wild Game Food for Your Family: Nutritious Meat, Fish, and Vegetable Recipes that are Delicious and Easy to Prepare (Sustainable Living), ASIN B00AB3TBI8
- Recipes and Tips for Sustainable Living, ISBN 978-1440235559
