= Cream of sorrel soup =

Traditional French springtime food

- Alternative names: potage Germiny, crème Germiny, potage crème d'oseille
- Type: Soup
- Associated cuisine: French
- Main ingredients: Sorrel, cream
- Ingredients generally used: Egg yolks, broth

Cream of sorrel soup, also known as potage Germiny, crème Germiny, or potage crème d'oseille, is a traditional French springtime vegetable soup, often served cold. It can be made with French sorrel (Rumex scutatus), common sorrel (Rumex acetosa), or foraged wild greens with similar flavor profiles, such as sheep's sorrel (Rumex acetosella), wood sorrel (Oxalis corniculata, Oxalis albicans), sour grass, young leaves of dock (Rumex crispus, Rumex obtusifolius), and others.

It is described as a classic French dish, and food writer Bonny Wolf states that "The French have probably had the longest, most ardent love affair with sorrel." Craig Claiborne called potage Germiny "one of the absolute marvels of soupdom". (Note: Claiborne, who grew sorrel in his Long Island garden, recommended chiffonading the greens as they were harvest-ready, then cooking them "briefly in butter and at this point it may be placed in tightly sealed containers; it will freeze well to be used with such abandon as quantity permits as the winter progresses.") Mastering the Art of French Cooking includes potage crème d'oseille in a cluster of three similar recipes along with potage crème de cresson (cream of watercress) and potage crème des épinards (cream of spinach). The cookbook's authors state that cream of sorrel soup can be served hot or cold, and that cooks should "cut the leaves into chiffonade...do not purée the soup".

Ingredients in the recipe from the 1971 Cent Merveilles de la cuisine française by Robert Courtine included sorrel, beef bouillon, heavy cream, egg yolks, cayenne, and white pepper. A recipe for potage Germiny published in the United States in 1977 listed sorrel, butter, whipping cream, egg yolks, chicken broth, red pepper sauce, and "freshly ground [black] pepper". A recipe for vegan cream of sorrel soup uses potatoes and miso as a texture and flavor base. According to contemporary chef Hank Shaw, "As you might expect from a vegetable whose chief attribute is tartness, this soup would be inedible without the cream and eggs to temper it. With them, however, it becomes a bright, smooth wake-up call from a long winter." Older, larger leaves of sorrel (and associates) are more sour than younger, smaller leaves, thus other ingredient proportions may need to be adjusted accordingly.

The name potage Germiny is said to be a tribute to French banker and finance minister Charles Le Bègue de Germiny.

== See also ==
- Invasivore
- Oxalic acid
- Sorrel soup – Cold vegetable soup of Eastern Europe
