= Johannes Scharf =

Austrian painter and illustrator

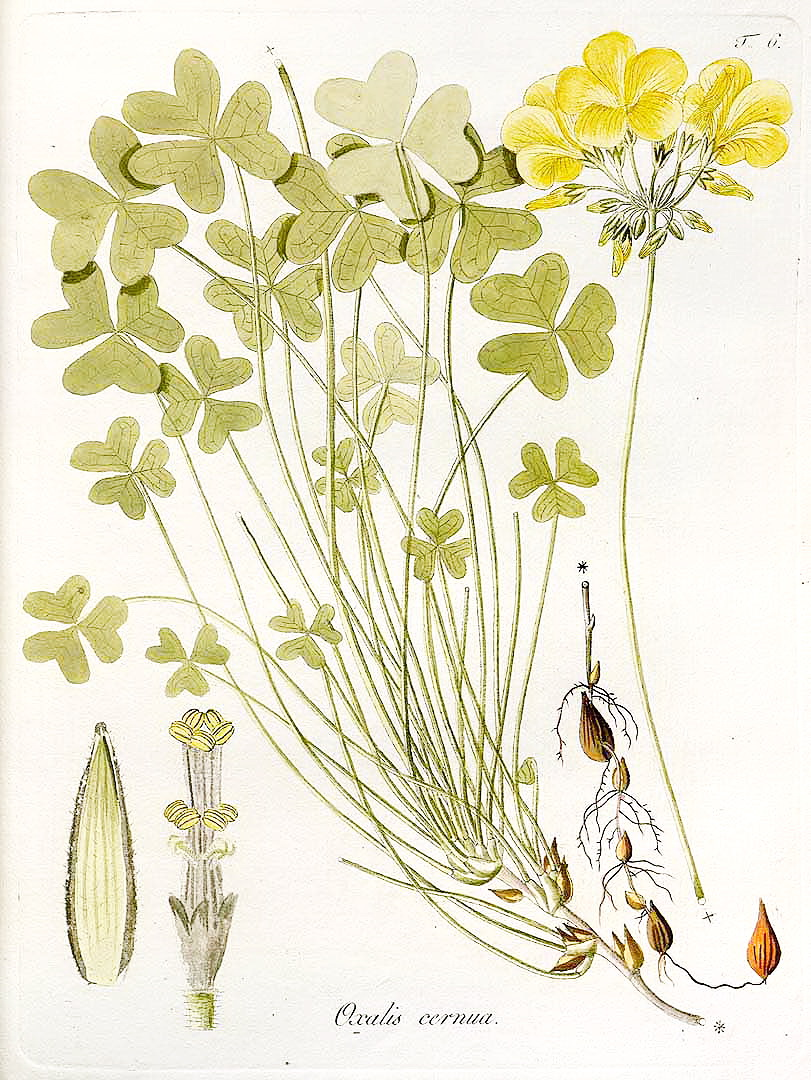
Oxalis pes-caprae

Johannes Scharf (1765–1794), was an Austrian painter and illustrator.
