= Euxoa oberfoelli =

Scientific classification
- Domain: Eukaryota
- Kingdom: Animalia
- Phylum: Arthropoda
- Class: Insecta
- Order: Lepidoptera
- Superfamily: Noctuoidea
- Family: Noctuidae
- Genus: Euxoa
- Species: E. oberfoelli

Binomial name
- Euxoa oberfoelli Hardwick, 1973

Species of moth

Euxoa oberfoelli, or Oberfoell's dart moth, is a species of cutworm or dart moth in the family Noctuidae. It is found in North America.

The MONA or Hodges number for Euxoa oberfoelli is 10818.
