= MeatEater =

Hunting television series

- Created by: Zero Point Zero Production Inc.
- Starring: Steven Rinella (host)
- Country of origin: United States
- No. of seasons: 11
- No. of episodes: 120

Production
- Running time: Domestic: half-hour

Original release
- Network: Sportsman Channel
- Release: January 1, 2012 – October 16, 2016
- Network: Netflix
- Release: October 2, 2018 – February 22, 2022

MeatEater is a non-fiction outdoors hunting television series in the United States on Netflix starring Steven Rinella. The show first aired on January 1, 2012, and is produced by Zero Point Zero Production. The latest 12th season premiered on October 12, 2023 on the MeatEater website and YouTube channel.

== Episodes ==
Season	Episodes		Originally released		
Season	Episodes		First released	Last released	Network
1	10		January 1, 2012	April 22, 2012	Sportsman Channel
2	8		June 1, 2012	November 18, 2012	Sportsman Channel
3	16		January 6, 2013	November 10, 2013	Sportsman Channel
4	18		January 9, 2014	September 25, 2014	Sportsman Channel
5	16		January 8, 2015	October 1, 2015	Sportsman Channel
6	16		January 14, 2016	October 16, 2016	Sportsman Channel
7	16		October 2, 2018		Netflix
8	8		October 19, 2019		Netflix
9	10	5	September 16, 2020		Netflix
9	10	5	February 17, 2021		Netflix
10	10	5	September 29, 2021		Netflix
10	10	5	February 2, 2022		Netflix

=== Season 1 (2012) ===
No. overall	No. in season	Title	Original release date
1	1	"Alaska: Blacktail Deer"	January 1, 2012
Steven Rinella wants to hunt where few have hunted before. To gain access to pristine ground, he charters a float plane to drop him high in the Alpine zone of Alaska’s Coastal Rainforest. He spends three days alone in the wild hunting for blacktail deer and cooks up rock-pounded tenderloin.
2	2	"Alaska: Black Bear"	January 8, 2012
As the cold Alaskan winter approaches, bears flock to the high country of Alaska's Chugach Range while feasting on cranberry and blueberry. As summer turns to fall, the bears have exhausted low-elevation fruit and their quest to fatten up pushes them into higher and less accessible terrain. At the end of the hunt, Steven Rinella fries the black bear meat in its own fat as a celebratory meal.
3	3	"Arizona: Coues Whitetail Deer"	January 15, 2012
Steven Rinella draws a tag to hunt Coues deer in the mountains of southern Arizona. In tune with the local culture, Steve packs a small kit of tortillas, chilies, and all the fixings to prepare fire-grilled heart tacos.
4	4	"California: Wild Hogs"	January 22, 2012
On this trip, Steven Rinella travels to the Sacramento Valley in central California to hunt wild hogs. He prepares a back-country gourmet feast of pork loin roasted with apples and rosemary cooked in tinfoil over a fire.
5	5	"Montana: Mule Deer"	January 29, 2012
Along with a trio of pack llamas, Steven Rinella, along with his brother Matt and friend Matt Moison camp and hunt in the arid and frozen badlands of Eastern Montana for mule deer. To combat the freezing temperatures, Rinella makes a stew to celebrate a successful hunt.
6	6	"Texas: Aoudad"	March 11, 2012
Steven Rinella heads into the Texas backcountry after the Barbary sheep, or Aoudad, of North Africa. He cooks them up in traditional hunter-style over a fire.
7	7	"Texas: Javelina"	April 1, 2012
Steven Rinella heads to West Texas in search of javelina. Featured meal is boiled javelina with cactus pears.
8	8	"Alaska: Mountain Goat"	April 8, 2012
Every year, a handful of hunters draw a permit to hunt the Mills Creek region of Alaska’s Kenai Peninsula. Steven Rinella holds one of the permits this year, and he and his brother Danny backpack into the mountains, into country they’ve never seen, in hopes of finding a billy goat.
9	9	"Alaska: Ducks"	April 15, 2012
Steven Rinella joins his friend, wildlife biologist Brandt Meixell, on a remote trip to some untouched Alaska wetlands in search of ducks and geese. With a big spread of decoys and a loyal retriever, they try to get their limit and fill their bellies with a constant supply of duck meat. Featured meal is willow-spit roasted whole duck.
10	10	"Wisconsin: Whitetail Deer"	April 22, 2012
Steven Rinella heads to Wisconsin to spend a few days on his friend's historical family farm. He enlists other locals to help him hunt for a big buck or doe in the famed Driftless area. Featured meal is grilled butterfly venison steaks and Hassenpfeffer.

=== Season 2 (2012) ===
No. overall	No. in season	Title	Original release date
11	1	"Montana: Wild Turkey"	July 1, 2012
Steven Rinella and his brother Matt load up the llamas for a backcountry spring turkey hunt in Montana’s Powder River Breaks. This rugged terrain is the brothers’ long time stomping ground and they will pack deep into the badlands to get away from people and close to some Toms. Featured meal is camp-fried turkey schnitzel.
12	2	"Arizona: Mountain Lion"	July 8, 2012
America’s desert Southwest is a sharp, hard country of cactus, deep canyons, and big cats. Steven Rinella arrives to learn the truth about one of the hunting world’s most controversial acts—tracking a lion with dogs until it is bayed on a cliff or in a tree. Learning from two expert lion hunters, he immerses himself in a style of hunt that is totally new to him. He is humbled by the challenge it presents, this hunt is physically brutal and emotionally taxing. Sometimes the reward of the hunt is the thrill of success and a delicious meal, and other times it's a more personal, and possibly more important lesson of knowledge and humility.
13	3	"Mexico: Wild Buffalo"	July 15, 2012
Hunting a powerful living relic from a bygone era, Steven Rinella heads into the mountains of the Sonora Desert on a wild, free-ranging buffalo hunt. Steve knows buffalo, but seeing and stalking these beasts in this dry, stark habitat is a wild experience, very different from anything he’s ever done. After a careful long-distance stalk Steve takes a young bull and winds up with yards of bison meat to share with his family, friends, and locals. With a little help, Steve prepares a multicultural feast for a table of hungry cowboys.
14	4	"New Zealand: Red Stag"	October 14, 2012
Steven Rinella flies halfway around the world to take on the red stag in New Zealand’s South Island. Steve learns whether his North American hunting skills will translate for these foreign beasts.
15	5	"New Zealand: Wild Boar"	October 21, 2012
Steven Rinella and local wild pig legend, Darren Moore, spend a day tracking down Captain Cook boars in the thick New Zealand bush. These pigs are tenacious and possibly dangerous to both the men and the dogs.. When success is had, Steve learns a new technique for field-prepping whole hogs.
16	6	"New Zealand: Tahr Part 1"	October 28, 2012
Steven Rinella gears up for a massive climb into New Zealand’s Southern Alps in pursuit of chamois and tahr. Guide and friend, Remi Warren, shows Steven the ropes of hunting the high-country of New Zealand’s alpine. The men travel light and hunt for food as they go, basing out of an alpine hut as they locate their quarry. With an impassable glacial river between Steve and his goal, things quickly get dangerous and intense.
17	7	"New Zealand: Tahr Part 2"	November 4, 2012
Steven Rinella continues his hunt in New Zealand working towards his ultimate goal. Featured meals are rock-grilled chamois, tahr tartar, and a mountaintop tahr-B-Q.
18	8	"Giving Thanks: Thanksgiving Cooking Special"	November 18, 2012
On this special Holiday episode, Steven Rinella cooks three dishes: wild turkey galantine, smoked black bear ham, and his take on the traditional mincemeat pie. Appetites run large as Steve makes a special meal for his family and friends.

=== Season 3 (2013) ===
No. overall	No. in season	Title	Original release date
19	1	"True North: Alaska North Slope Caribou"	January 6, 2013
Steve and special guest, the author Tim Ferriss, travel to the remotest corner of Alaska to catch the annual migration of the famed Western Arctic caribou herd. On the open tundra they are met with challenges, wild adventures, and grizzlies. After two intense hunts for bull caribou, they feast on a stew of caribou sirloin and root vegetables thickened with bone marrow.
20	2	"The Greatest Draw: Alaska Dall Sheep Pt. I"	January 13, 2013
After drawing one of the most coveted big game permits in North America – a Tok Management Area Dall sheep tag – Steven Rinella heads out for a truly rare Alaskan experience. Along with two buddies, Steve is dropped deep into the Tok backcountry. After a rugged hike through nasty weather, Steve’s skills and fortitude are tested against his elusive, high-climbing quarry.
21	3	"The Greatest Draw: Alaska Dall Sheep Pt. II"	January 20, 2013
The culmination of Steven Rinella’s Tok sheep results in Steve and his hunting partners heading upriver to chase bears. A stalk ensues, and plenty of meat eating is enjoyed. Featured meals are Dall sheep steak with wild blueberry pancakes, Dall ribs cooked over a rock oven, and willow-roasted black bear loin.
22	4	"Sonoran Superbirds: Mexico Gould’s Turkey"	January 27, 2013
Steven Rinella crosses the border to call in and chase some big Gould’s turkeys. Of the five turkey species in North America, the Gould’s is the largest and is heavily protected in the US. On this Mexican adventure, Steve will be hunting with friend and expert Jay Scott. After their successful hunt Steve will use locally-sourced charcoal to grill up a big, brined bird.
23	5	"Cooking Special: Wild Game for the Big Game"	February 2, 2013
Steven Rinella prepares a collection of appetizers from animals harvested on recent MeatEater episodes for this "Big Game" cooking special. Featured dishes include tahr chili, Dall sheep sliders, Javelina tacos, and caribou sausage.
24	6	"Straight Flush: Montana Mountain Grouse"	April 7, 2013
Steven Rinella and his friend Ronny Boehme drive into the mountains of southwest Montana to hunt the high ridge tops for dusky grouse. Featured meal is dusky grouse jalapeño poppers and grouse fettuccine with a white wine and cream sauce.
25	7	"Meet the MeatEaters: Montana Crew Muley Pt. 1"	April 14, 2013
In the first installment of this two-part behind-the-scenes MeatEater episode, Steven Rinella promises his crew he will provide them with some venison to share with their families for Thanksgiving Dinner.
26	8	"Meet the MeatEaters: Montana Crew Muley Pt. 2"	April 21, 2013
The behind-the-scenes special of MeatEater continues.
27	9	"First Timers: Montana Mule Deer Pt. 1"	April 28, 2013
Television personality Joe Rogan and his best friend, comedian Bryan Callen, join Steven Rinella on a float trip for mule deer through the Missouri Breaks, hunting and camping along the way.
28	10	"First Timers: Montana Mule Deer Pt. 2"	May 5, 2013
The second installment of a two-part episode covering the first hunt taken by comedians Joe Rogan and Bryan Callen. Steven Rinella cooks a traditional camp meal of as buck liver cooked with onions and a whole venison head roasted under a bed of coals.
29	11	"Forbidden Feast: Mexico Javelina and Coyote"	October 6, 2013
While Steven Rinella has had multiple experiences with spot-and-stalk hunting for javelina, in this episode he’s shown an entirely new tactic when his buddy Remi Warren demonstrates how to use a predator call to bring the peccaries in at a full run. The results are surprising. After the hunt, the javelinas get turned into a local delicacy, Chorizo de Javelin, with help from an experienced Mexican ranch cook. In addition, Steve and Remi hunt for coyote with the intent of roasting a whole animal.
30	12	"Swamp Stew: Michigan Bow Fishing"	October 13, 2013
Steven Rinella returns to his boyhood stomping grounds in Michigan’s Muskegon Marsh to bow-fish for sucker, bowfin, and gar. Along the way, he demonstrates the rich bounty of wild foods that can be found in this freshwater paradise. Featured meals are salt-packed sucker and fried gar.
31	13	"The Wide Open: New Mexico Antelope"	October 20, 2013
Steven Rinella heads to a friend’s big-country ranch in Northeastern New Mexico to stalk the fastest and most wary big game animal in the US: the pronghorn antelope. After harvesting his kill, he prepares a big pot of antelope chili packed full of New Mexico’s most famous red or green export.
32	14	"Primal Cuts: Bone-In Cooking Special"	October 27, 2013
In this cooking special, Steven Rinella shows his fans some of his favorite preparations for big, bone-in cuts of red meat. Interspersed with highlights from his recent caribou, buffalo, and mule deer hunts, the show features recipes that utilize some of the most under-appreciated parts of big game animals.
33	15	"El Venado Blanco: Mexican Coues Deer"	November 3, 2013
Steven Rinella returns to Sonora, Mexico to hunt for Coues deer during the peak rutting season. Steve sets camp in the high country and spends days glassing for these small and elusive deer while his hunting partner, Remi Warren, tries to stalk one with a bow. To cap off the hunt, Steve cooks a batch of venison ribs braised in a Dutch oven buried beneath the coals.
34	16	"Clash of the Titans: California Pig and Deer"	November 10, 2013
In this episode, Steven Rinella joins forces with fellow hunter and cook Hank Shaw in the hills of Central California to go after Columbia blacktail deer, wild pigs, and a handful of small game species that are in season.

=== Season 4 (2014) ===
No. overall	No. in season	Title	Original release date
35	1	"Sea Bear: Alaska Spring Bear and Seafood"	January 9, 2014
Steven Rinella ventures out to his hunting and fishing shack on a remote coastline of southeast Alaska’s Prince of Wales Island. While hunting bears from a skiff and a canoe, Steve gathers a variety of prime seafood and makes a discovery about his own motivations as a bear hunter.
36	2	"Full Boar: Whole Hog Cooking Special"	January 16, 2014
On a spring hunt in Florida Steven Rinella got his hands on a wild barred hog. In the field Steve demonstrates the best way to break a hog down and bring him home. Later, Steve and his good friend, chef Matt Weingarten, cook four preparations from the hog’s head, skin, trotters, muscle, and guts.
37	3	"Bull By Boat: British Columbia Moose"	January 23, 2014
Steven Rinella and his buddy Ryan Callaghan float a remote river on a moose hunt that results in some of the most dangerous moments in Steve’s life as a hunter. The two hunters travel far from civilization in a raft to search for the massive moose that call the area home.
38	4	"Local Motion: Montana Bull Elk"	January 30, 2014
Steven Rinella gets brutalized by bad weather and fierce competition during a late-season central Montana elk hunt. Guided only by waypoints shared by a buddy of his, Steve encounters plenty of elk but is plagued by other hunters at every turn – leaving Steve with a tough, ethical decision that hunters sometimes face: to pursue or not to pursue?
39	5	"The Northern Rockies: British Columbia Grizzly Pt. 1"	February 6, 2014
Steven Rinella and his buddy Ryan Callaghan, a British Columbia guide, hike into the steep backcountry of northern British Columbia in search of grizzlies. This alpine adventure includes some intense and up-close bear action – almost too close.
40	6	"The Northern Rockies: British Columbia Grizzly Pt. 2"	February 13, 2014
Steve and his buddy Ryan Callaghan continue to search for grizzlies but don’t want to go home empty-handed. When they spot a sizable black bear, Steve decides to pursue it – keeping an eye out for that elusive boar grizz.
41	7	"Opening Day: Wisconsin Whitetail Pt. 1"	February 20, 2014
Steven Rinella and his buddy Doug Duren give comedians Joe Rogan and Bryan Callen their first taste of Midwest deer hunting culture by sitting in freezing ground blinds on opening day in Wisconsin. The biggest challenge isn't the cold, it's the temptation to shoot a young, immature buck on Doug's well-managed farmland. It just wouldn't be a trip to the Duren Family Farm without a little trapping and duck hunting thrown in, rounding out the larder for a big wild game feast.
42	8	"Opening Day: Wisconsin Whitetail Pt. 2"	February 27, 2014
The Wisconsin hunt with comedians Joe Rogan and Bryan Callen continues as the hunters attempt to thin Doug's deer herd by culling some does. The cold just won't relent and the guys get a real taste of northern air. Steven Rinella checks his traps in hopes of giving Joe and Bryan their first taste of beaver meat, and Joe learns an important and fundamental lesson of the hunting lifestyle. After a weekend of hard hunting, they all converge on the kitchen to partake in the spoils and eat their fill of fresh meat.
43	9	"Opening Day: Spring Beak: Florida Osceola Turkey"	March 6, 2014
Steven Rinella and his friend, Robert Abernathy, head to southern Florida to hunt Osceola turkeys. Steve hopes to finish off his royal turkey slam, achieved by bagging all five subspecies of the American wild turkey—a quest that’s been a decade in the making. Featured meal is a grilled and stuffed turkey breast.
44	10	"Boone & Bugles: Kentucky Elk"	July 31, 2014
Steven Rinella is invited by the Rocky Mountain Elk Foundation to hunt elk during the rut in the coal country of southeastern Kentucky, a place once roamed by his hero Daniel Boone. This is Steve’s first eastern elk hunt, and he quickly realizes that the rules of the game here are different. If he manages to bump into one, he’ll prepare what was supposedly Boone’s favorite meal: elk liver.
45	11	"Cold Water: Alaskan Seafood Cooking Special"	August 7, 2014
After a spring bear hunt near his cabin on Prince of Wales Island in Alaska, Steven Rinella sets out with traps and rod in hand to reap in the wealth of seafood in the waters nearby. There, he catches Dungeness crabs, spot prawn, and rockfish and takes some time to dig clams on the shore near his cabin. Before returning home, Steve demonstrates how to clean and prep the seafood to freeze and store. Back in the kitchen, Steve creates a handful of dishes—both traditional and not-so-traditional—that take full advantage of that irreplaceable flavor of wild-caught seafood.
46	12	"Big Buck Dreams: Mule Deer"	August 14, 2014
Set against his annual muley hunt, this year in southwest Colorado, Steven Rinella takes to the lectern and fills us in about his favorite critter, the mule deer. As Steve hunts he will share his vast knowledge about the species, how to hunt it, how to butcher it, and most importantly, how to cook and eat it.
47	13	"Surf N Turk: Wisconsin Turkey & Carp"	August 21, 2014
Steven Rinella scratches his spring turkey itch this year as he visits Southeast Wisconsin to call in some big eastern Toms with his buddy Jerod Fink. The guys plan to do some serious cooking, and have plans to serve and enjoy a real Midwest turkey and fish fry.
48	14	"The Best Start-Wild Game Breakfast Cooking Special"	August 28, 2014
Breakfast is the most important meal of the day, but is often overlooked by wild-game cooks at home. Following a series of successful hunts across North America this past fall, Steven Rinella demonstrates how to cook a variety of breakfast classics using wild game ingredients—including black bear bacon, which Steve has never tried before.
49	15	"Gila Monster-New Mexico Bull Elk"	September 4, 2014
After four years of waiting, Steven Rinella draws a coveted, limited-entry public land elk tag and heads into New Mexico’s Gila National Forest on a solo backpack hunt. His biggest challenge here is the vast expanse of hills covered in enough timber to hide an army – demanding much glassing and even more hiking. Here, even just one missed opportunity could result in an empty freezer at home.
50	16	"Hearts of Darkness-Ticker Cooking Special"	September 11, 2014
While it’s considered a long-standing hunting tradition to eat the heart of your first kill, the heart is otherwise often underutilized in a wild game chef’s repertoire. Using the hearts from a wild boar, mule deer, caribou, moose and elk, Steven Rinella shares five of his favorite methods to prepare this underappreciated, nutrient-rich muscle.
51	17	"Alaska Bear Hunt Part 1"	September 18, 2014
Masters of their respective fields, Steven Rinella will take Navy SEAL Rorke Denver deep into the Alaskan backcountry to hunt black bears in the mighty Alaska Range. After several flights and a long climb up the ridge, the men will trade secrets and look into the differences and similarities between the hunter and the warrior. The bears are out and hungry, but they’re fast and in dense cover, forcing the men to work hard for their mountain meal.
52	18	"Alaska Bear Hunt Part 2"	September 25, 2014
The Alaskan backcountry hunt continues as Steven Rinella and Rorke Denver manage to maneuver their way through the thicket and find themselves hot on some bears. Their luck holds out and the hunt is successful, but Rorke soon learns that the hunt is only half the battle. After a lesson in field butchering, Rorke and Steve head back to camp to do a little fishing and foraging to round out their bear feast.

=== Season 5 (2015) ===
No. overall	No. in season	Title	Original release date
53	1	"Yukon Giants-Northern Alaska Moose Part 1"	January 8, 2015
Dumped lakeside on the south side of Alaska’s Brooks Range, Steven Rinella and wildlife biologist Brandt Meixell have ten days of hunting before the plane returns. Big-antlered Yukon moose are the primary objective but Rinella’s lifelong quest for a mature male grizzly could come to an end as well. The two also discuss what makes a hunter a biologist, and a biologist a hunter.
54	2	"Yukon Giants-Northern Alaska Moose Part 2"	January 15, 2015
The clock is ticking after a missed shot on a small bull and Steve and Brandt are desperate not to return home empty-handed. Luck finds them on the last day and walks right into their crosshairs.
55	3	"Deer the Hard Way: Prince of Wales Island"	January 22, 2015
Steve has been to Clover Lake before, but he feels he’s just scratched the surface exploring the surrounding country. The top of the mountain is always calling Steve’s name, and for this leg- stretcher he’s bringing along comedians Joe Rogan and Bryan Callen. Hunting Sitka blacktail deer introduces Rogan & Callen to their third species of North American deer. Laughs abound as Steve initiates Joe and Brian into some serious Alaskan backpack hunting.
56	4	"Burger Extravaganza Cooking Special"	January 29, 2015
As the prime cuts are often the first to go, most families are left with a freezer brimming with ground wild game meat. Pulled from the pages of his forthcoming wild game cookbook, Steve shares a variety of recipes from burger to meatloaf and more – designed to whittle down this supply and jazz up your ground meat game.
57	5	"Welcome to the Jungle: Adventures in Bolivia Part 1"	February 5, 2015
Steve is fascinated by indigenous cultures that still survive without the crutches of modern day technology. In this three-part series, he travels deep into the Amazon jungle to hunt with and learn from the locals there. Not only will this be one heck of a hunting adventure, it will be a mind-opening, life-changing event. You never know what the evening’s menu will bring in the jungle until Steve fires an arrow. Steve focuses on fishing in this episode.
58	6	"Welcome to the Jungle: Adventures in Bolivia Part 2"	February 12, 2015
Steve is fascinated by indigenous cultures that still survive without the crutches of modern day technology. In this three-part series, he travels deep into the Amazon jungle to hunt with and learn from the locals there. Not only will this be one heck of a hunting adventure, it will be a mind-opening, life-changing event. You never know what the evening’s menu will bring in the jungle until Steve fires an arrow. Steve participates on and indigenous hunt where he comes across a howler monkey.
59	7	"Welcome to the Jungle: Adventures in Bolivia Part 3"	February 19, 2015
Steve is fascinated by indigenous cultures that still survive without the crutches of modern day technology. In this three-part series, he travels deep into the Amazon jungle to hunt with and learn from the locals there. Not only will this be one heck of a hunting adventure, it will be a mind-opening, life-changing event. You never know what the evening’s menu will bring in the jungle until Steve fires an arrow. Steve continues his night hunt in the Bolivian jungle.
60	8	"About Time: Helen and Brittany Elk Hunt in Montana"	February 26, 2015
Brittany and Helen have put more work in on MeatEater than just about anyone else. For two years these adventurous ladies have built up an intense desire to learn how to hunt, and it’s about time they get out there. Steve secures a cow elk tag apiece for them and takes them through the process from beginning to end. They need to get their hunters safety, learn to shoot, train for the woods, and get geared up. When November comes they're ready to go, and they strike out into the mountains of northern Montana for the adventure of their lives. First Lite’s Ryan Callaghan comes along to lend a helping hand, and they all head into the Sweetgrass Hills with high hopes of eating a traditional first-hunters’ meal of fresh elk heart.
61	9	"Sky Island Solitare: Backpack Hunting Coues Deer in Arizona"	August 13, 2015
Steve returns to southern Arizona to stalk one of his favorite quarry the elusive Coues deer. Unaccompanied, Steve immerses himself in the quiet southwest desert and gets intimate with one of the most wary animals in the west. Giant felines threaten the story but Steve stays on course and articulates why solo time in trophy country is good for the soul.
62	10	"Ribeye of the Sky: Sandhill Cranes in West Texas"	August 20, 2015
Steve and fellow bird hunting aficionado Ronny Boehme join up with Wildlife Biologist Ed Arnett in Lubbock, Texas to hunt Sandhill cranes. Though not many people have actually eaten them, the Sandhill crane carries the nickname "rib eye of the sky" because of its supposed similarities to a handsome cut of beef. It’s fast action and plenty of laughs as Steve, Ronny, and Ed dispel any culinary myths about these birds with a Texas style "Crane Cookout."
63	11	"The Coldest Hunt: Nunivak Island Muskox"	August 27, 2015
Lightning strikes twice: Steven Rinella has somehow beaten the odds and drawn a second Muskox tag after having to forfeit his first one four years ago due to unforeseen circumstances. Steve’s only regret in life was passing up his opportunity to hunt Muskox. With another tag in his pocket, nothing will stop this adventure. We learn about the history and culture of Nunivak Island as Steve tries to stay warm while chasing Muskox 30 miles offshore in the Bering Sea. The muskox is delicious but the tomcod dipped in seal oil is fit for the hippest Brooklyn restaurant.
64	12	"Gobbling: California Turkeys with Joe Rogan and Bryan Callen"	September 3, 2015
Last time Joe Rogan and Bryan Callen went out with Steven Rinella they were soaked head to toe and came home meatless. To remedy their meat crisis while keeping them dry, Steve sets up a springtime wild turkey hunt in sunny California. Steve gives Joe and Bryan the A to Z on hunting, butchering, and cooking the wild turkey. Steve caps off the introductory lesson by preparing his favorite turkey recipe: Schnitzel.
65	13	"Unconventional: Alaska Sooty Grouse, Part 1"	September 10, 2015
In the first part of this series, Steve attempts to hunt Sooty Grouse on his own to marginal success. These mysterious hooters are a hunt that is markedly different from any other.
66	14	"Unconventional: Alaska Sooty Grouse, Part 2"	September 17, 2015
In Part One, we saw the difficulty of hunting the Sooty grouse of Ketchikan, Alaska. We rejoin Steven Rinella and Barbara in Juneau, AK as they continue to pursue "hooters." Tromping through Southeast Alaska rainforest, Steve and Barbara discover a mutual fondness for an unconventional hunt. Barbara concludes the week of hunting cooking fettuccine a la grouse.
67	15	"Cooking Special: Wild to Table: MeatEater Memorable Meals"	September 24, 2015
Steve loves to fish as much as he loves to hunt. Steve is on a river in SW Montana for a day to catch some rainbow trout and cook a few over a fire. As fishing and campfire cooking offer time for reflection, Steve takes the time to recall a few memorable MeatEater meals. From caveman style sheep ribs in the Alaska Range to curiosity-induced coyote BBQ in Mexico, these meals give Steve the chance to explore what it means to be a MeatEater.
68	16	"Up at the Cabin: Prince of Wales Island Black Bear with Paul Neess"	October 1, 2015
Last spring, Steve decided to pass up an opportunity to kill a black bear in favor of an extended up close and personal experience. This year, Steve heads back to his shack on Prince of Wales Island and he’s brought Vortex Optics’ Paul Neess along to share the rush of using a canoe to slip in close to these giant black bears.

=== Season 6 (2016) ===
No. overall	No. in season	Title	Original release date
69	1	"Southern Traditions: Virginia Doves"	January 14, 2016
All across America hunters kick off the fall hunting season with a weekend of doves, friends, and food. MeatEater regular Ronnie Boehme has invited Steve out to his digs in Virginia for the dove opener. To prep for opening day, Steve and Ron spend a day brushing up on their shotgun technique on a sporting clays course followed by a pigeon hunt. Steve shares simple cooking methods for doves and pigeons on the grill.
70	2	"Mountain Meditation: British Columbia Grizzly Bear"	January 21, 2016
Ryan Callaghan and Aaron Evans join Steve on an epic adventure in British Columbia’s Rockies to pursue grizzly bears. Steve has set specific means of take, guided by personal ethics, for his grizzly bear hunt. The hunt is dampened by weather but Steve finds a way to fix a tasty meal.
71	3	"Lobster of the Prairie: Wyoming Antelope"	January 28, 2016
Steve is fed up with the disrespect the antelope receives. Bad hunting protocol, poor meat quality, it’s all a wives’ tale. Through this week's hunt, Steve aims to make antelope lovers out of everyone and give the antelope the respect it deserves.
72	4	"Land of the Giants: Idaho Mule Deer Part 1"	February 4, 2016
Steve’s quest for a giant mule deer buck continues in central Idaho. To help Steve in his journey, First Lite's Ryan Callaghan has offered up one of his best spots as well as his keen spotting skills. The duo pack into some of the West’s steepest and prettiest mountains seeking a creature of mythological reputation: the colossal buck of Steve’s dreams.
73	5	"Land of the Giants: Idaho Mule Deer Part 2"	February 11, 2016
Steve’s quest for a giant mule deer buck continues in central Idaho. To help Steve in his journey, Ryan Callaghan has offered up one of his best spots as well as his keen spotting skills. The duo backpack hunt in some of the West’s steepest and prettiest mountains seeking a creature of mythological reputation: the colossal buck of Steve’s dreams. In part two Steve finally connects with a buck that can be classified as giant. The dream is realized; Steve and Ryan feast on a slow cooked roast.
74	6	"Cooking Special: Butchering a Whole Deer"	February 18, 2016
Plain and simple: Steve gives the “how to” on breaking down a whole whitetail deer. Steve starts with a whole deer, minus the hide and guts, then takes you through the process of transforming it into steaks, roasts, shanks and, of course, all the oddities that are often discarded.
75	7	"Duren Deer Camp: Helen and Brittnay Wisconsin Whitetail Part 1"	February 25, 2016
Helen Cho and Brittany Brothers, integral parts of the MeatEater production team, are back for a double episode. This time around they’re hunting whitetail deer in Wisconsin on the famed Duren farm with Doug Duren and Steve as their guides. Arriving a few days early to scout and tune up their shooting with some squirrel hunting, the ladies enter the next chapter of their hunting careers.
76	8	"Duren Deer Camp: Helen and Brittnay Wisconsin Whitetail Part 2"	March 3, 2016
Helen Cho and Brittany Brothers, integral parts of the MeatEater production team, are back for a double episode. This time around they’re hunting whitetail deer in Wisconsin on the famed Duren farm with Doug Duren and Steve as their guides. In part two both Helen and Brittany get their chance at Duren farm bucks. Hobo dinners over the campfire make it deer camp.
77	9	"Steve Makes the Team: Kentucky Small Game"	August 11, 2016
Kevin Murphy and his band of Kentucky small game hunters introduce Steve to the finest Kentucky has to offer. Gray squirrels with tree hounds and cottontails with beagles, in Kentucky, it’s the dogs that do the hunting. Cathead biscuits, sawmill gravy, and fried small game round out the Kentucky adventure.
78	10	"A Trip of Firsts: Mexico Coues Deer and Javelina"	August 18, 2016
Steve and Janis head to the Sonoran Mountains of Mexico to hunt the elusive Coues deer & javelina.
79	11	"Lone Star Pork: Texas Hog"	August 25, 2016
Steve joins ranch manager and wildlife biologist Ben Binnion for a couple of days during his annual pig roundup to learn about the other side of the Texas hog story.
80	12	"Trapped in History: Wyoming Beaver"	September 1, 2016
Steve explains what goes into beaver trapping while retelling stories of the mountain men who depended on this animal, for both its surprisingly delicious meat and incredible hide.
81	13	"Cooking Special: Smoked Meats"	September 8, 2016
Steven is a cooking thief, otherwise known as a student of the culinary arts, and this week, he's learning from Chef Eduardo Garcia of Charged Film & Montana Mex, a storied chef who loves wild game as much as Steve does.
82	14	"Mountain Memories: Montana Bear"	September 22, 2016
Steve returns to his black bear roots in southwest Montana for a spring black bear hunt. He's hunted these mountains before, it's a special place and he's glad to be back.
83	15	"Living Off the Water: Kentucky Fish"	September 29, 2016
Set lines, limb lines, trot lines, turtle traps, bows and arrows, they all make it out onto the Kentucky water with MeatEaters Steven Rinella & Kevin Murphy.
84	16	"A Lesson In Conservation History: New Mexico Turkey"	October 16, 2016
Hot on a 100-year-old hunting tip from Aldo Leopold, Steven joins Karl Malcolm in New Mexico to chase the Merriam's wild turkey.

=== Season 7 (2018) ===
No. overall	No. in season	Title	Original release date
85	1	"Nevada Mule Deer"	October 2, 2018
Actor and Comedian Joe Rogan joins Steve on a bowhunting expedition to the Great Basin of Nevada for skittish quarry: the high desert mule deer.
86	2	"Alaska Moose: Part 1"	October 2, 2018
Steve's friends Janis and Papa Janis join Steve on a moose and caribou hunt in east-central Alaska that's the fulfillment of a lifelong dream.
87	3	"Alaska Moose: Part 2"	October 2, 2018
After early success on their moose and caribou hunt in Alaska, wild game has eluded Steve's party, so he and Janis decide it's time to take action
88	4	"Prince of Wales: Fishing and Deer"	October 2, 2018
On Prince of Wales Island in Alaska, Steve and former producer Morgan Fallon go fishing, stalk Sitka blacktail deer, and prepare a delicious feast.
89	5	"Wyoming Sage Grouse"	October 2, 2018
Steve and his buddy Ronny Boehme head to southeast Wyoming, where they shoot clays with Gov. Matt Mead before heading out on a sage grouse hunt.
90	6	"Prince of Wales: Sitka Blacktail Deer Part 1"	October 2, 2018
Steve hunts Sitka blacktails on Prince of Wales Island with his friends Ryan and Mark but ends up with a dinner of fried sea cucumbers.
91	7	"Prince of Wales: Sitka Blacktail Deer Part 2"	October 2, 2018
Steve and his buddies Ryan and Mark have better luck splitting up as they continue their quest for a Sitka blacktail deer at the start of the rut.
92	8	"Remy And Steve, Elk Hunting Again"	October 2, 2018
During the cold closing days of elk season, Steve ascends thousands of feet into the Bitterroot Mountains of Western Montana, seeking a legal bull.
93	9	"Guyana Part 1"	October 2, 2018
On an angling expedition along the Rewa River in Guyana, Steve and his Macushi guides catch exotic species such as black piranha and vampire fish.
94	10	"Guyana Part 2"	October 2, 2018
Continuing on his Guyana voyage, Steve, with guides Rovin and Dennis, goes deep for redtail catfish then learns to craft arrows with curassow feathers.
95	11	"Guyana Part 3"	October 2, 2018
In the third and final leg of his Guyana journey, Steve and his party portage their boats around rapids to bow-fish for pacu, an herbivorous piranha.
96	12	"Colorado Mule Deer"	October 2, 2018
In Colorado's White River National Forest, Steve and his friend Brody Henderson chase mule deer through aspen groves, then taste-test their harvests.
97	13	"The Hanging Tree: Afognak Island Elk"	October 2, 2018
Steve and his friend Remi Warren stalk Roosevelt elk on Afognak Island in the Gulf of Alaska, but inclement weather proves a significant obstacle.
98	14	"Fortymile Caribou: Part 1"	October 2, 2018
Along with two buddies from the midwest, Steve flies into the wilderness of remote east-central Alaska to hunt during the Fortymile caribou migration.
99	15	"Fortymile Caribou: Part 2"	October 2, 2018
Steve continues his hunt with friends Doug and Mark for Fortymile caribou during the herd's winter migration, culminating in a camp-stove fondue.
100	16	"Wild Game Master Class"	October 2, 2018
Steve spends an episode in the kitchen demonstrating how to prepare several of his favorite game dishes that include turkey, trout, dove, and venison.

=== Season 8 (2019) ===
No. overall	No. in season	Title	Original release date
101	1	"The Mud and The Trees"	October 18, 2019
102	2	"Blue Mountain Bugles"	October 18, 2019
103	3	"Ghosts of the Chesapeake Part 1"	October 18, 2019
104	4	"Ghosts of the Chesapeake Part 2"	October 18, 2019
105	5	"Turkey Troubles"	October 18, 2019
106	6	"Borderland Bucks Part 1"	October 18, 2019
107	7	"Borderland Bucks Part 2"	October 18, 2019
108	8	"Walking The Clouds"	October 18, 2019

=== Season 9 (2020) ===
No. overall	No. in season	Title	Original release date
Part 1
109	1	"South Texas Redfish & Flounder"	September 16, 2020
110	2	"South Texas Nilgai"	September 16, 2020
111	3	"Wyoming Mule Deer Part 1"	September 16, 2020
112	4	"Wyoming Mule Deer Part 2"	September 16, 2020
113	5	"Colorado Elk"	September 16, 2020
Part 2
114	6	"South Dakota Ducks"	February 16, 2021
115	7	"Colorado Mule Deer"	February 16, 2021
116	8	"Montana Black Bear and Turkey"	February 16, 2021
117	9	"Alaska Fish"	February 16, 2021
118	10	"Alaska Moose"	February 16, 2021

=== Season 10 (2021) ===
No. overall	No. in season	Title	Original release date
Part 1
119	1	"Wyoming Pronghorn with Luke Combs"	September 29, 2021
Accompanied by country music star Luke Combs, Steven stalks pronghorn on the plains of Wyoming but encounters an unusual obstacle; a flock of sheep.
120	2	"High Country Mountain Goat"	September 29, 2021
On an alpine mountain goat hunt in the Rockies, Steven and guest Kurt Racicot discover the whiteout conditions make their elusive prey tough to spot.
121	3	"Lone Star Whitetails"	September 29, 2021
At a South Texas ranch, Steven and Clay Newcomb host wild-game chef Jesse Griffiths, who turns their white-tailed venison into five flavorful dishes.
122	4	"Flash in the Pan"	September 29, 2021
Steve embarks on what he deems a "humbling, humiliating" hunt for deer during Pennsylvania's flintlock season, using 18th-century firearms.
123	5	"Hillbilly Heaven"	September 29, 2021
In Northwest Arkansas, Steven travels on muleback into the Ozarks with Clay Newcomb and Janis Putelis to hunt squirrels by day and raccoons by night.

== Awards and nominations ==
In 2013, MeatEater won a Sportsman Choice Award for Best New Series.

Also in 2013, MeatEater was nominated for a James Beard Foundation Award for Best Television Program, On Location.

In 2014, MeatEater won a Sportsman Choice Award for Best Overall Production.

In 2016, MeatEater won a Sportsman Choice Award for Best Small Game Episode for "Steve Makes the Team: Kentucky Small Game".
