= Mountain Gazette =

American outdoor culture magazine

Mountain Gazette is an American outdoor culture magazine founded in 1966 and based in North Lake Tahoe, California. A large-format, biannual print publication, it features long-form storytelling, photography, essays, fiction, and illustrations covering mountain life, adventure sports, the environment, and Western culture. The magazine was compared in its early years to the Village Voice for its gonzo approach to outdoor journalism. It has been published under three distinct editorial eras, surviving two extended hiatuses, and is widely regarded as one of the most influential independent outdoor publications in American history.

== History ==
=== Founding and first era (1966–1979) ===
Mountain Gazette was founded in 1966 as Skier’s Gazette, initially a niche publication catering to skiers. Its founding editor, Mike Moore, reportedly taught a course at a Denver community college on literature and drinking, meeting students at a different bar each week to discuss legendary works of writing. The magazine’s offices were located in Denver, Colorado. Moore changed the name to Mountain Gazette to reflect the expanding range of subjects appearing in its pages, with skiing becoming just one of many areas of interest.

Moore’s editorial approach emphasized authenticity and depth, exploring critical issues facing the West alongside art and literary offerings, which distinguished the magazine from other outdoor publications. Gaylord Guenin took over from Moore and moved the Gazette to Boulder, Colorado, where he edited the magazine through its final issues. The magazine was kept financially afloat by Aspen benefactor George Stranahan before closing in 1979.

Despite its cultural influence, the magazine was not a financial success. Contributor Edward Abbey, one of its best-known writers, reportedly enclosed checks with his manuscripts to help support the publication. In 1983, Mike Moore and others attempted to revive the Gazette, but the effort did not succeed.

=== Second era (2000–2012) ===
In 2000, journalist M. John Fayhee contacted Moore about resurrecting Mountain Gazette. Within months, Fayhee had secured financing and a staff, and established a new office in Frisco, Colorado, publishing the first issue in nearly 20 years. Fayhee spent 12 years at the helm of the magazine, bringing a style of long-form journalism focused on Western characters, mountain town culture, and sharp criticism of outside commercial interests encroaching on mountain communities. Fayhee sold the magazine in 2005. The title subsequently passed through several owners — GSM Media, Skram Media, and Active Interest Media — before Summit Publishing Co. acquired it from Active Interest in 2010. Summit Publishing ceased printing the magazine in 2012, citing difficulty selling advertising across its broad Rocky Mountain distribution area.

=== Third era (2020–present) ===
In January 2020, ski journalist and publisher Mike Rogge purchased Mountain Gazette through his media company, Verb Cabin, while the magazine’s back issues sat in storage outside Boulder, Colorado. Rogge acquired the title for $5,000 and a cold beer, with the handwritten bill of sale drawn up at a bar in Denver. By March 2020, at the start of the COVID-19 pandemic, 30 boxes of old Mountain Gazette issues arrived at Rogge’s home in Tahoe.

Under Rogge’s ownership, Mountain Gazette publishes twice yearly in a large 11-by-17-inch format — dwarfing most publications — featuring essays, reported stories, full-bleed photography, and humor pieces printed on heavyweight paper. The magazine has been profitable since its third month under Rogge’s ownership, with advertising limited to just ten brand partners Rogge calls “partners.” In 2026, coinciding with the magazine’s 60th anniversary, Rogge published Print Ain’t Dead: A Mountain Gazette Anthology, a curated collection of the best stories across all three eras of the magazine’s history.

== Format and editorial philosophy ==
Mountain Gazette is not a publication of gear reviews, listicles, or guides to après-ski attire. Rogge has described his intent as capturing the bigness of the world on the page, with the oversized format reflecting a belief that photographers and writers who risk their lives deserve more than a small blurb on cheap paper. Contributors to the current era include actor Steve Martin, who writes an outdoor column illustrated by New Yorker cartoonist Harry Bliss.

== Notable contributors ==
Mountain Gazette has published work from some of the most prominent writers, journalists, climbers, and outdoor figures in American cultural history. Contributors across all three eras include Edward Abbey, Hunter S. Thompson, Royal Robbins, Dick Dorworth, Galen Rowell, Tim Cahill, Katie Lee, George Sibley, John Nichols, Barry Corbet, Ted Kerasote, David Roberts, Dolores LaChapelle, Gaylord Guenin, M. John Fayhee, Henrik Harlaut, Jeremy Jones, Ingrid Backstrom, Sadie Stein, and Jeremy Bernstein, among many others.

=== Editors ===
• Mike Moore (1966–c. 1979), founding editor

• Gaylord Guenin (c. late 1970s), editor

• M. John Fayhee (2000–2012), editor

• Mike Rogge (2020–present), owner and editor
