= Rinella =

Rinella may refer to:

- Steven Rinella
- Fort Rinella
