= Mike Rogge =

American ski journalist

Mike Rogge (born c. 1985) is an American ski journalist, publisher, and author. A native of the Adirondack Mountains of upstate New York, Rogge began writing about skiing at age 17. He graduated from SUNY Potsdam in 2008 with a degree in writing and literature. Rogge currently resides in the North Lake Tahoe area of California.

== Career ==
After graduating in 2008, Rogge moved to Burlington, Vermont, where he worked as an editor at Ski The East. During his time there he developed a ski-related talk show. That show caught the attention of the Powder Magazine editor at that time; Derek Taylor. This soon led to Rogge being hired as an editor of Powder Magazine, working for three years.

His career continued at ESPN, Vice Sports, and the Ski Journal. He later founded his production company Verb Cabin, directing and producing short films that appeared at venues including the Brooklyn Museum and PBS, also screening at the Banff Mountain Film Festival.

In January 2020, Rogge purchased Mountain Gazette, a beloved outdoor culture magazine that had been dormant since 2012, with the aim of relaunching it and reinvigorating its readership. Under his ownership, Mountain Gazette publishes twice yearly in a large 11-by-17-inch format, featuring essays, reported stories, full-bleed photography, and humor pieces printed on heavyweight paper. The magazine has been profitable since its third month under Rogge's ownership beginning in 2020. (Cite Fast Company)

== Journalism ==
Rogge is represented by literary agent Marc Gerald of Europa Content, a boutique literary management and production company founded in 2018 based in Brooklyn, New York. Marc Gerald's client roster includes Questlove, Mel Robbins and Steve Rinella. Mike Rogge is under contract with Clarkson Potter / Penguin Random House for his debut book.
