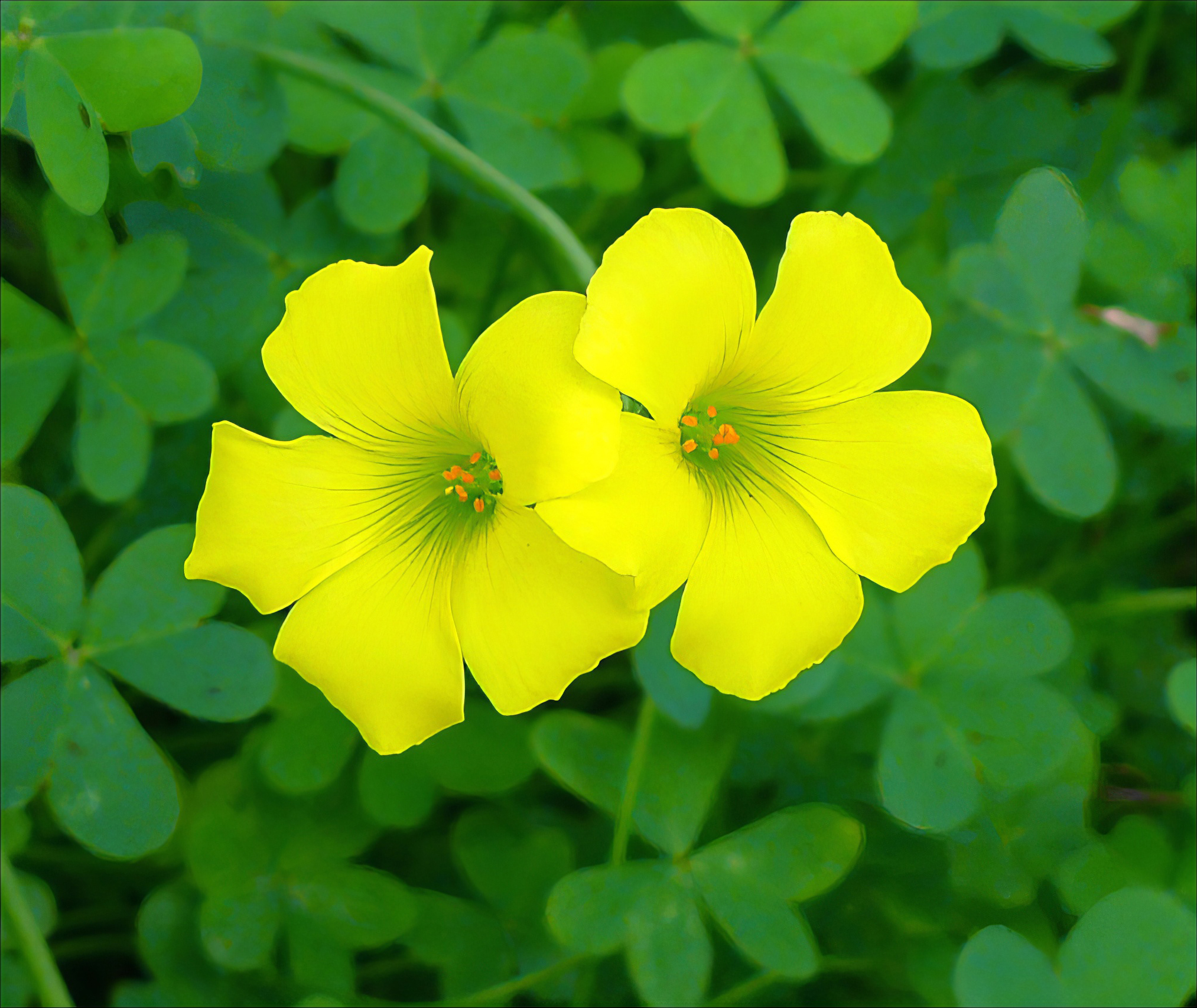
- Sourgrass

Scientific classification
- Kingdom: Plantae
- Clade: Tracheophytes
- Clade: Angiosperms
- Clade: Eudicots
- Clade: Rosids
- Order: Oxalidales
- Family: Oxalidaceae
- Genus: Oxalis
- Species: O. pes-caprae

Binomial name
- Oxalis pes-caprae L.

Synonyms
- List: Acetosella cernua (Thunb.) Kuntze; Acetosella ehrenbergii (Schltdl.) Kuntze; Bolboxalis cernua (Thunb.) Small; Oxalis biflora Burm.f.; Oxalis burmanni Jacq.; Oxalis caprina E.Mey. ex Sond.; Oxalis cernua Thunb.; Oxalis cernua var. pleniflora Lowe; Oxalis concinna Salisb.; Oxalis ehrenbergii Schltdl.; Oxalis erecta Savigny; Oxalis grandiflora Arechav.; Oxalis kuibisensis R.Knuth; Oxalis libyca Viv.; Oxalis lybica Willk. & Lange; Oxalis macrophylla Hornem.; Oxalis nutans Hill; Oxalis pes-caprae f. pleniflora (Lowe) Sunding; Oxalis pes-caprae var. pleniflora (Lowe) Blanco-Dios; Oxalis rippae Mattei

= Oxalis pes-caprae =

Species of flowering plant in the wood sorrel family

Oxalis pes-caprae is a species of tristylous yellow-flowering plant in the wood sorrel family Oxalidaceae. Oxalis cernua is a less common synonym for this species. It is commonly known as African wood-sorrel, Bermuda buttercup, Bermuda sorrel, buttercup oxalis, Cape sorrel, English weed, goat's-foot, sourgrass, soursob, or soursop; Afrikaans: suring; Arabic: hommayda (حميضة) or colloquially in Algeria, where it is widespread, 'qaryousa' (قريوصة), i.e. 'very sour'.

Some of the most common names for the plant reference its sour taste owing to oxalic acid present in its tissues. Indigenous to South Africa, the plant has become a pest plant in different parts of the world that is difficult to eradicate because of how it propagates through underground bulbs.

== Name ==
Oxalis pes-caprae is often called by the common name sourgrass due to its moderately sour flavor. This sourness is caused by an exceptionally high content of oxalic acid.

The specific epithet pes-caprae means 'goat's-foot', possibly in reference to the shape of the leaf.

== Description ==
The Oxalis pes-caprae flower is actinomorphic, with a calyx composed of five free or slightly fused sepals, a sympetalous corolla composed of five fused petals, an androecium composed of ten free stamens in two ranks, and a compound pistil. Native populations in South Africa are heterostylous, flowers of long-styled plants have a stigma held above the two ranks of stamens, mid-styled plants have the stigma in between the two ranks of stamens and short-styled plants have a stigma below both ranks of stamen. In the non-native range the plants largely reproduce vegetatively and many populations have only one style length and the plants never produce seed.

Like most African Oxalis species, it produces adventitious subterranean propagules. These take the form of true bulbs in botanical terms, which is unusual among dicotyledons. O. pes-caprae produces small bulbs copiously, whereas most other African species produce fewer, larger bulbs.

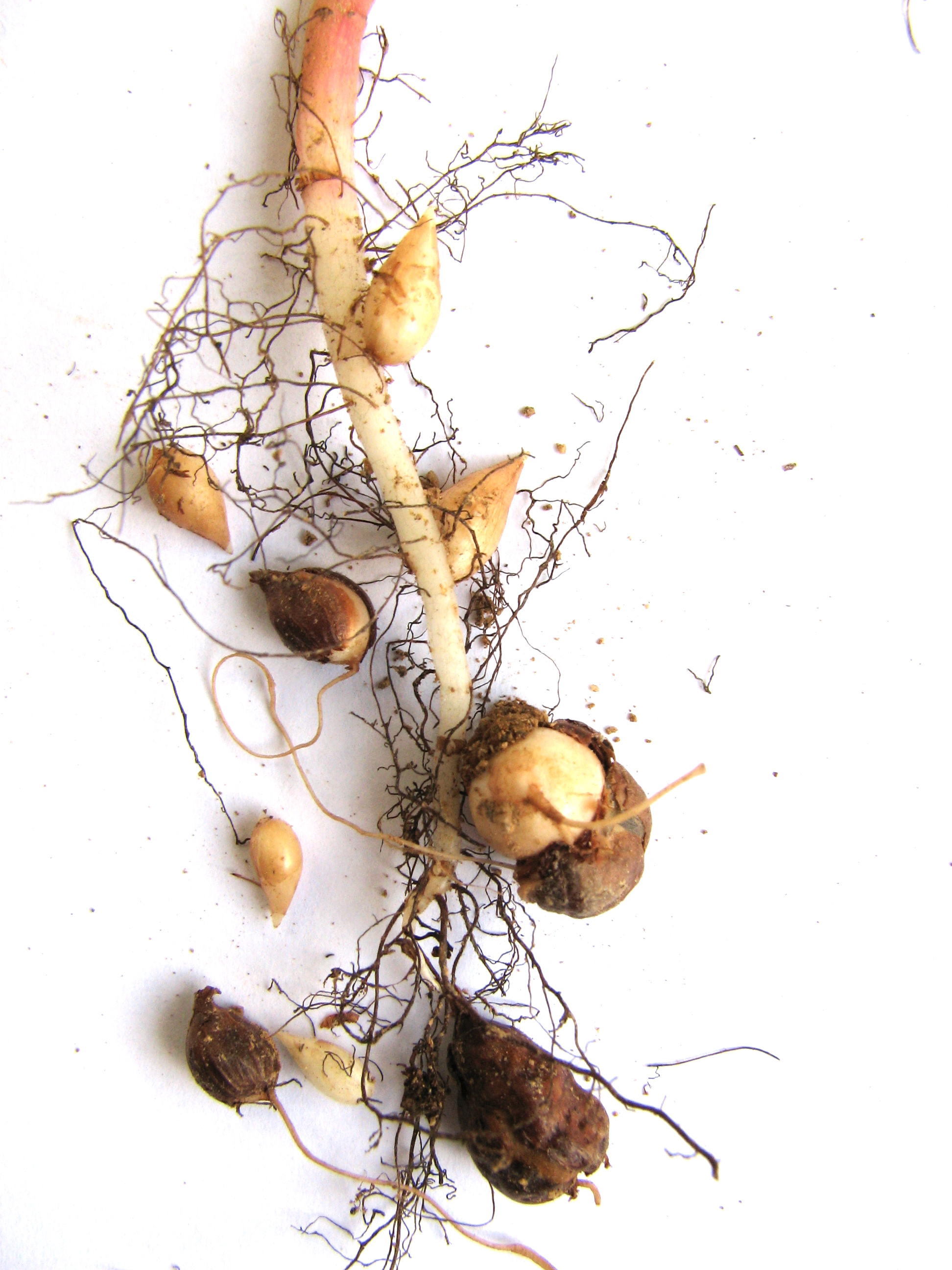
Bulbs and roots

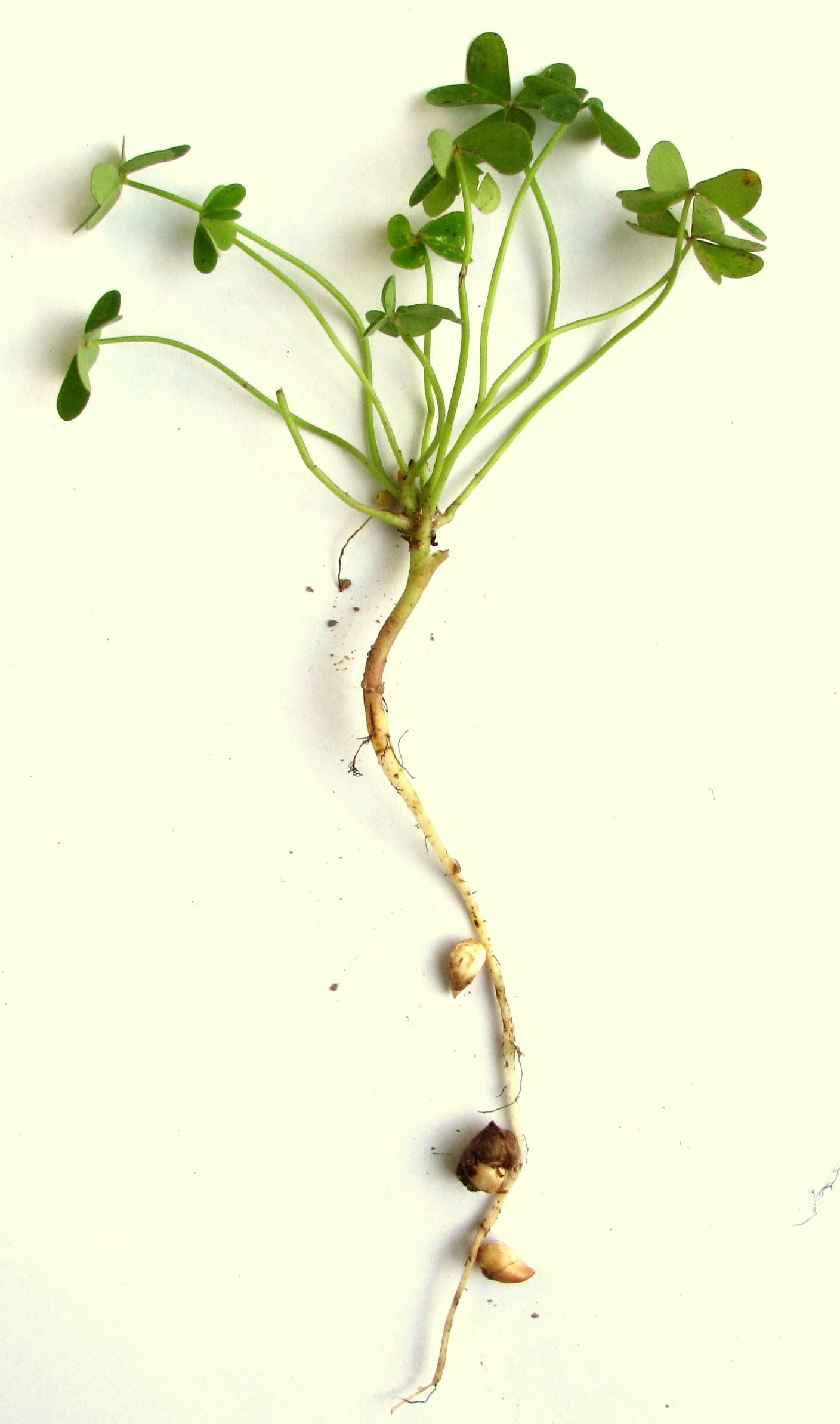
Uprooted plant

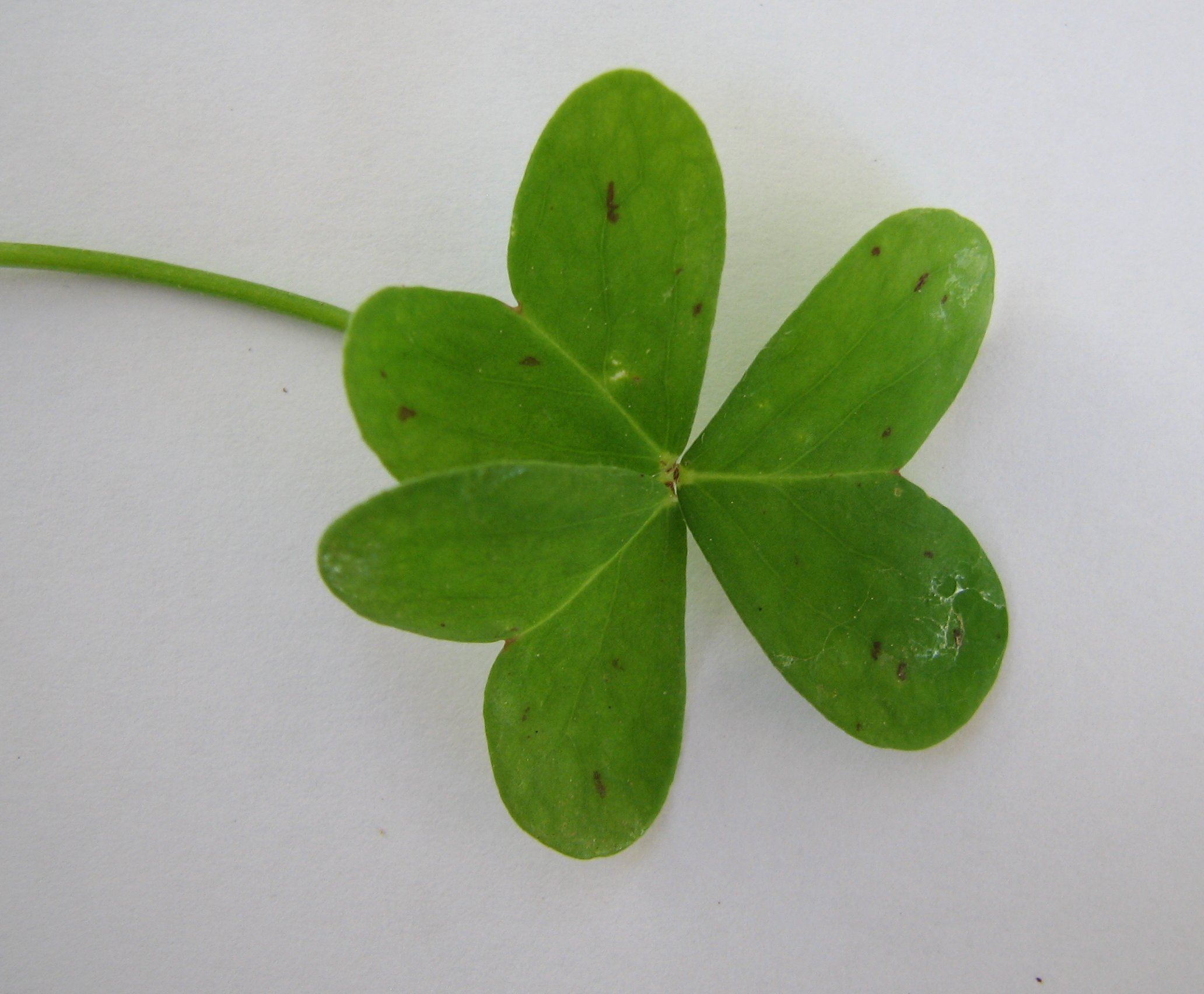
Leaf detail

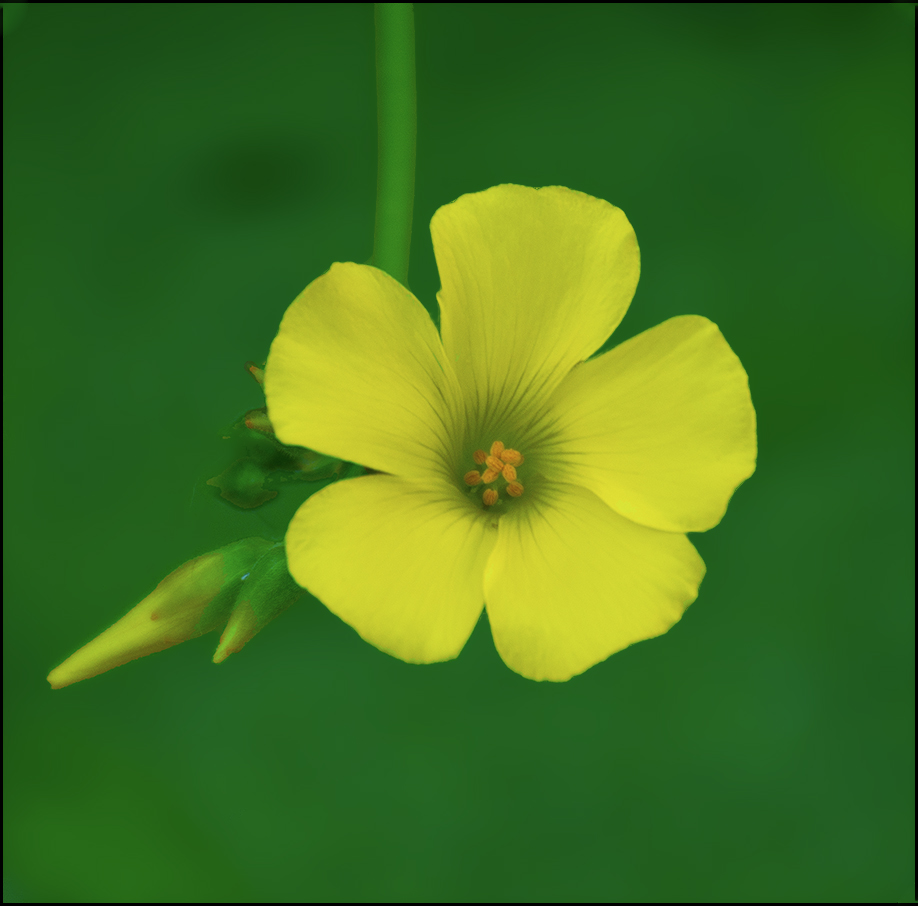
Open flower and a bud

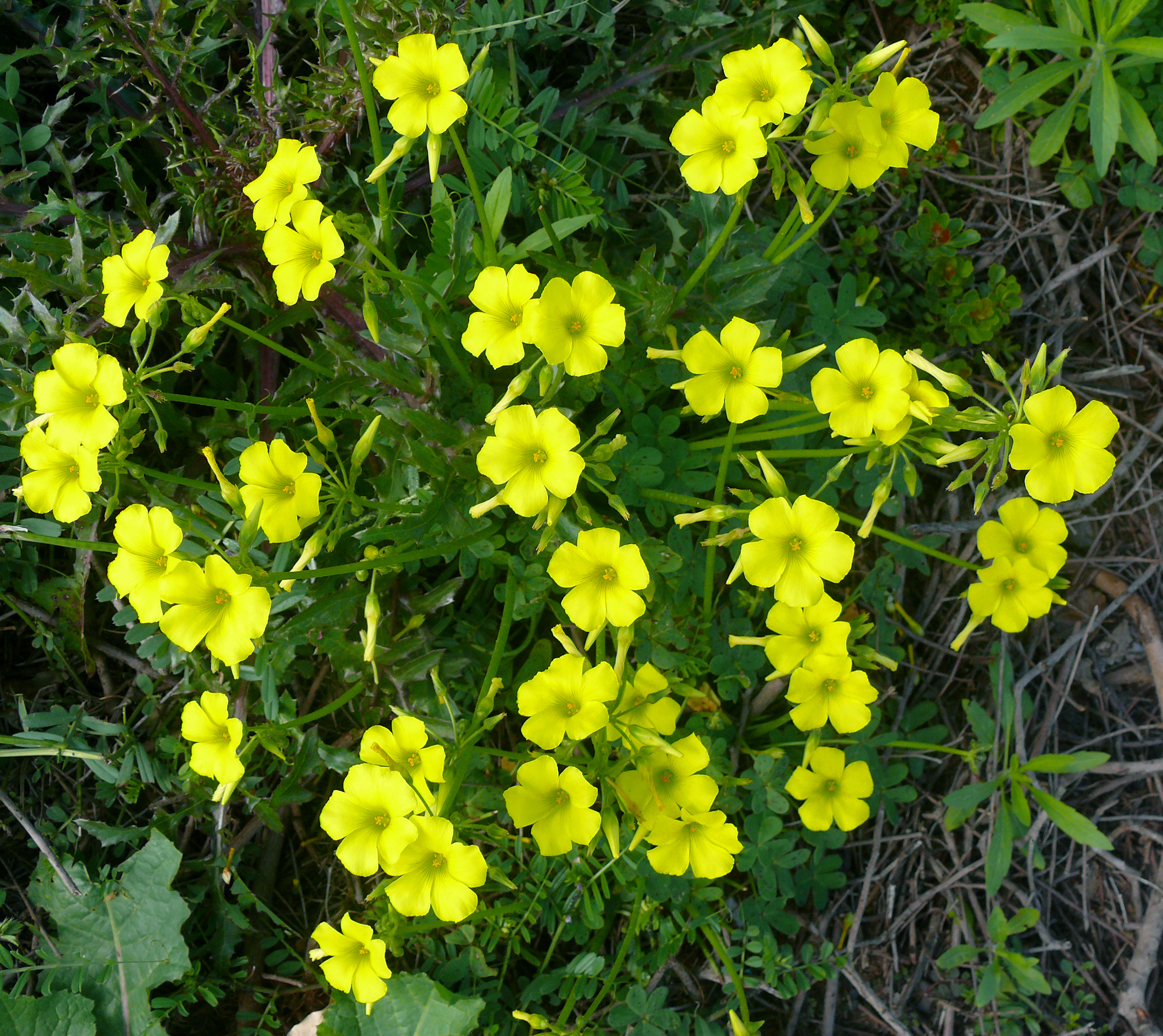
Open and closed flowers

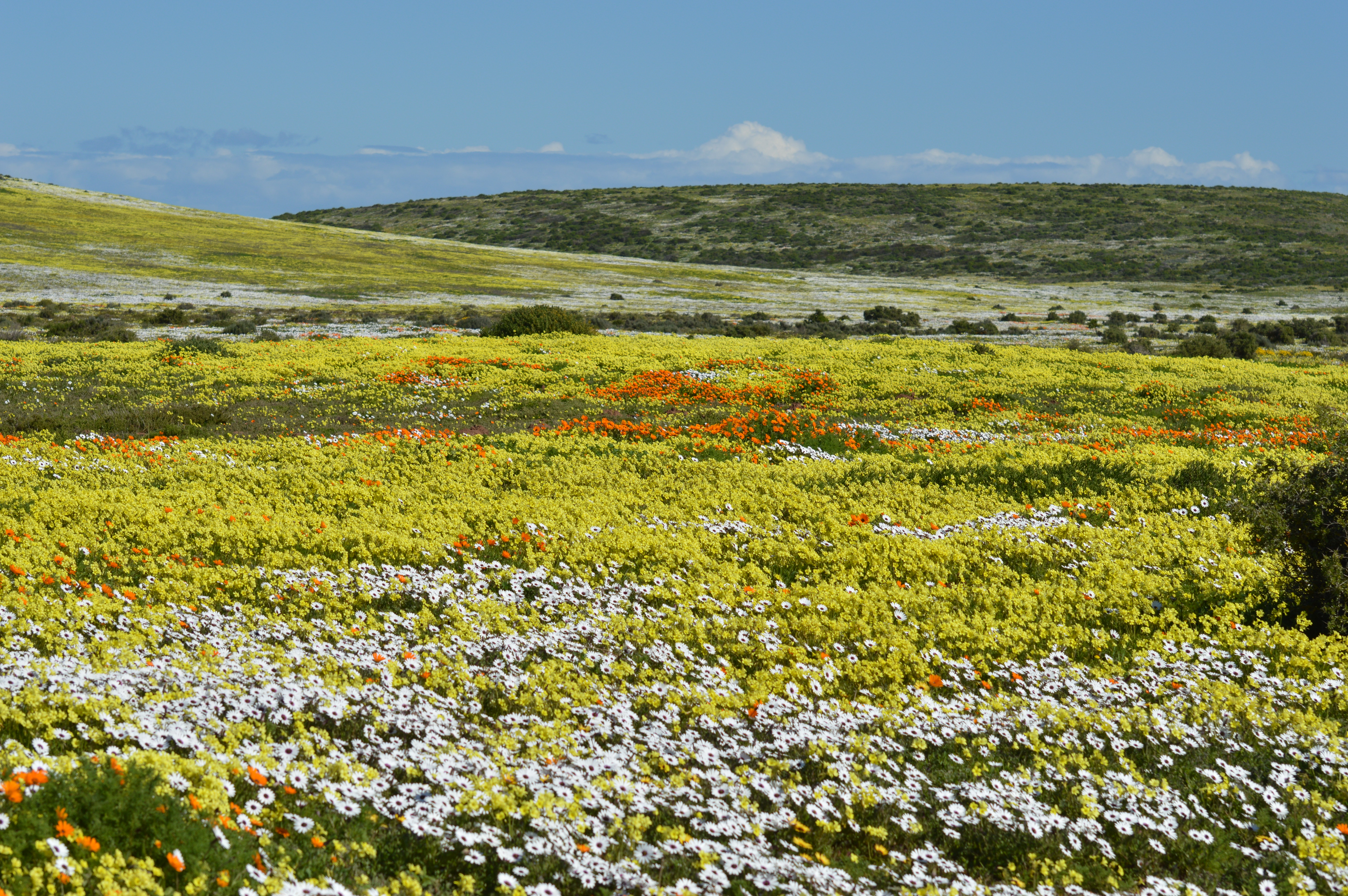
Yellow spring bloom on the west coast of South Africa with the white Dimorphotheca pluvialis and orange Arctotis hirsuta

== As an invasive species ==
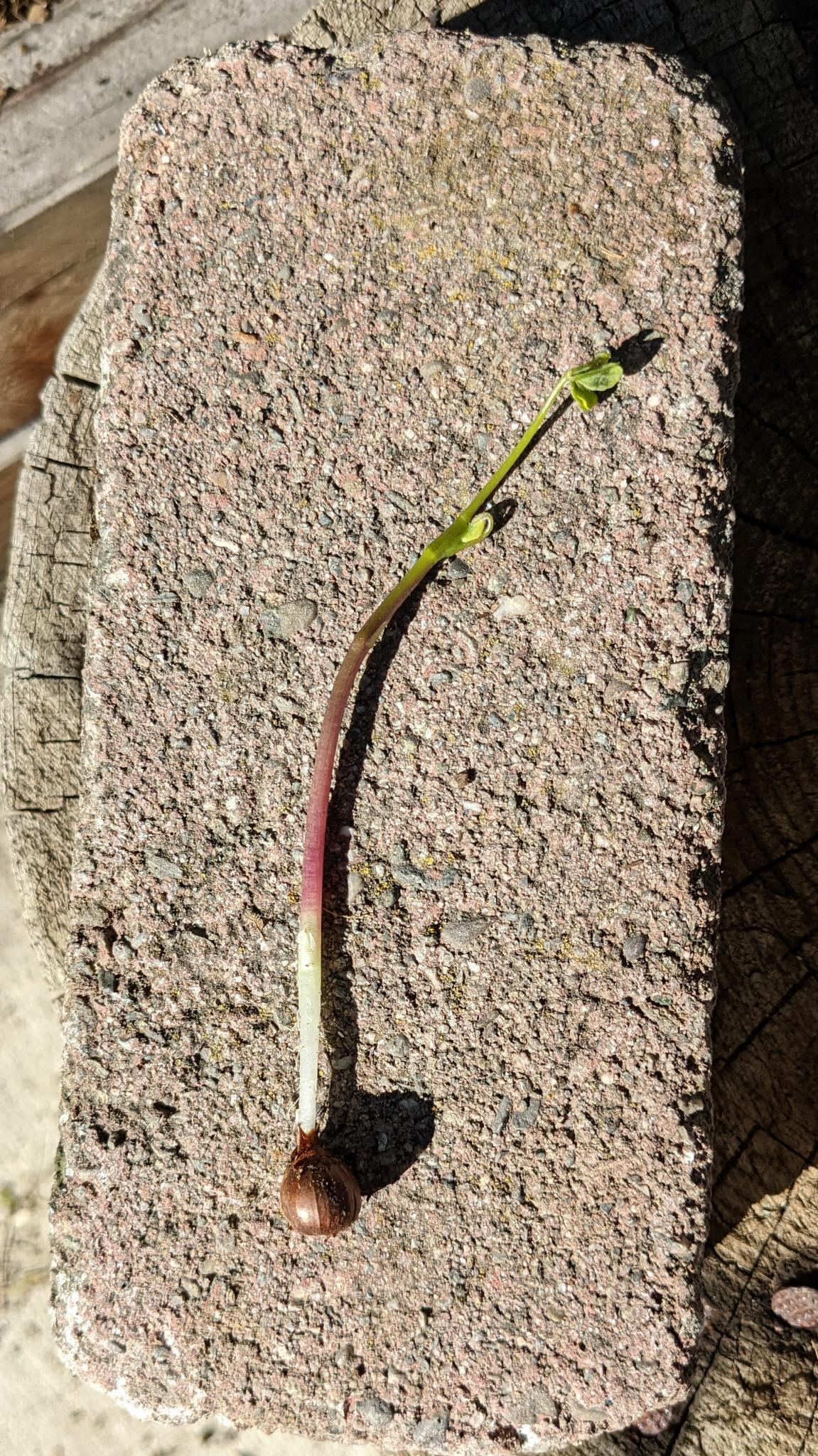
Invasive O. pes-caprae forms peanut-sized bulbs that survive the dry California summer, then sprout after rainfall.

Indigenous to South Africa, Oxalis pes-caprae is an invasive species and noxious weed in many other parts of the world, including the United States (particularly coastal California), Europe, The Middle East, and Australia.

=== Control ===
The plant has a reputation for being very difficult to eliminate by mechanical methods once it has spread over an area of land. The weed propagates largely through its underground bulbs and this is one reason why it is so difficult to eradicate, as pulling up the plant, even with the roots, can leave some of the bulbs behind. Soil in which the plant has grown is generally contaminated with many small bulbs.

Kluge & Claassens (1990) reported a potential biocontrol agent using Klugeana philoxalis, a larval feeder on shoots of O. pes-caprae.

Two studies have reported successful control using two different non-selective, consumer-grade herbicides. Imazapyr applied in late March 2016 at low concentration appeared to completely prevent re-sprouting of O. pes-caprae bulbs in the San Francisco area. Glyphosate was used successfully on a Mediterranean island, reported in 2019.

== Hazards ==
The leaves or roots are used in some parts of the world as a food, although the high levels of calcium oxalate in the plant may bear some risks. Such risks can be reduced if the plant parts are boiled first. Oxalic acid is toxic in large quantities, a concern in regions such as southern Australia where Oxalis pes-caprae grows invasively in enormous quantities and in high densities. Various sources suggest that oxalis ingestion causes calcium oxalate kidney stones, but clinical experience and physiological considerations make it unlikely that any realistic intake of Oxalis would affect human liability to kidney stones. Accordingly, some Australian references to the hazards of oxalis to livestock tend to be dismissive of this risk.

However, in spite of its comparatively benign nature, where it has become dominant in pastures, as sometimes happens outside South Africa, Oxalis pes-caprae certainly can cause dramatic stock losses. For example, when hungry stock, such as sheep released just after being shorn, are let out to graze in a lush growth of Oxalis pes-caprae, they may gorge on the plant, with fatal results, as has been found in South Australia at least.

Such stock fatalities patently have little logical connection with the presence or absence of oxalate kidney stones. For one thing, the fatal effects on sheep are far too rapid to result from the growth of bulk kidney stones. The plant has been found to be nutritious, but too acidic to be good fodder, largely being left untouched by grazing stock. When stock do consume large quantities, the effects typically involve death in several weeks with symptoms suggesting chronic oxalate poisoning, including tetany, or sudden death with extensive renal damage. Such damage suggests the twofold effect of calcium immobilisation (the tetany) and the formation of Calcium Oxalate Monohydrate raphides in the kidney tissue. The histotoxic effects of the raphides in kidney have by now been investigated.

Oxalis poisoning of stock is not a serious forage concern in South African pastures, unless exceptionally favoured by overgrazing.

== Uses ==
The plant is palatable and in modest quantities is reasonably harmless to humans and livestock. In South Africa it is a traditional ingredient in dishes such as waterblommetjiebredie ('water flower stew').

The plant has been used in various ways as a source of oxalic acid, as food, and in folk medicine. The raw bulbs have been used to deal with tapeworm and possibly other worms. The plant has been used as a diuretic, possibly hazardously. The lateral underground runners, which tend to be fleshy, have been eaten raw or boiled and served with milk. The golden petals can be used to produce a yellow dye.

== See also ==
- Cream of sorrel soup
