= Cutworm =

Type of moth larva

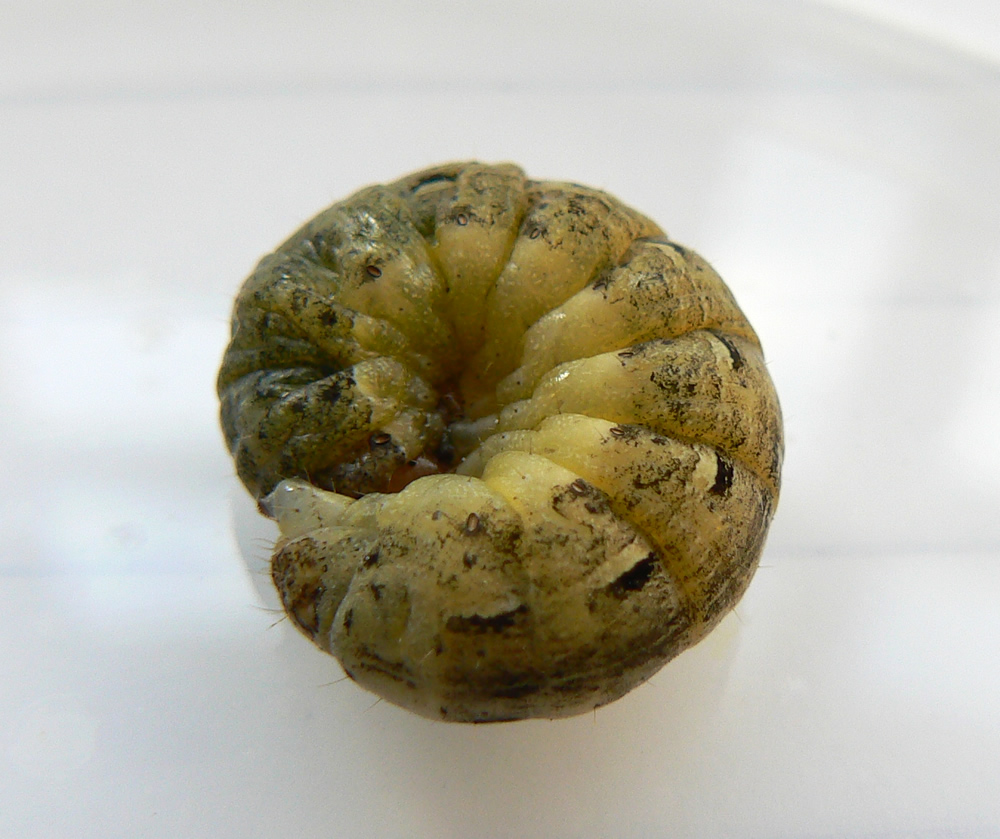
The cutworm larva of the large yellow underwing (Noctua pronuba)

Cutworms are moth larvae that hide under litter or soil during the day, coming out in the dark to feed on plants. A larva typically attacks the first part of the plant it encounters, namely the stem, often of a seedling, and consequently cuts it down, hence the name cutworm. Cutworms are not worms, biologically speaking, but caterpillars.

== Feeding and hiding ==
Cutworm larvae vary in their feeding behaviour; some remain with the plant they cut down and feed on it, while others often move on after eating a small amount from a felled seedling; such a wasteful mode of feeding results in disproportionate damage to crops. Cutworms accordingly are serious pests to gardeners in general, but to vegetable and grain farmers in particular. For example, it has been suggested that in South Africa, Agrotis segetum is the second worst pest of maize.

Note that the cutworm mode of feeding is only one version of a strategy of avoiding predators and parasitoids by day. Many other caterpillars, including Noctuidae and some kinds of processionary caterpillars, come out at night to feed, but hide again as soon as the sky begins to grow lighter. Some, for example Klugeana philoxalis, attack low-growing forbs such as Oxalis in the dark, and drop to the ground as soon as a light is flashed on them. Others will climb trees such as species of acacia nightly, leaving trails of silk, but they leave individual trails, not common trails like processionary caterpillars. The fruit-piercing moth Serrodes partita similarly lives under litter beneath its food plant, the tree Pappea capensis.

== Species and habits ==
The term cutworm applies mainly to larvae of various species in several genera within the Noctuidae, a large family of moths; however many noctuid species are not cutworms, and some moths whose larvae have essentially the same habit, which justifies calling them cutworms, are not noctuids. The turnip moth (Agrotis segetum), A. ipsilon, A. exclamationis, and other members of this genus, are well-known noctuids whose larvae are very damaging. Cutworms are notorious agricultural and garden pests. They are voracious leaf, bud, and stem feeders and can destroy entire plants. They get their name from their habit of "cutting" off a seedling at ground level by chewing through the stem. Some species are subterranean and eat roots. One of the most common garden pests is the variegated cutworm (Peridroma saucia), which can defoliate entire gardens and fields in days.

== Appearance and control ==
Cutworms are usually green, brown, grey, or yellow soft-bodied caterpillars, often with longitudinal stripes, up to 1 inch (2.5 centimeters) in length. There are many variations among the genera. There also are variations in their biology and control, so the following extension material must be applied only as appropriate to the region.

In many climates, cutworms will winter under the soil, either as final instar larvae or as pupae. This affords farmers an opportunity for control. Winter ploughing will kill many of the pests, and expose many more to predators. In suitable areas this is a powerful means of control, for example in grain fields. The same principle permits some domestic gardeners to kill the caterpillars without the problems associated with the use of pesticides; the first line of control can be to till the soil some weeks before planting to destroy any dormant larvae. Also, at any time during the season, if the population has been reasonably well controlled, but there are signs of localised cutworm attack, the domestic gardener may be able to deal with the problem simply by digging the soil and wet foliage to about 2 inches deep, and killing the caterpillars manually.

Starvation also can be effective when it is practical to keep weeds down before the growing season, by systematic cultivation. Together with reducing manure and compost, relying instead on other forms of fertilizer, this can improve control by discouraging cutworm moths from laying their eggs, and depriving the larvae of food.

Baits also can be effective where starvation strategies have been applied reasonably successfully; a sweetened bran mash containing a suitable stomach poison can be very effective against the small numbers of surviving caterpillars. The mash should be too crumbly and too thinly scattered to leave any lumps on the ground that domestic animals or desirable wild animals might otherwise pick up.

Because cutworms attack the first part of the plant they find at night, plant collars made of aluminum, or even cardboard barriers, can offer effective protection. Alternatively, a gallon planter with both ends removed may be used.

== Natural enemies ==
Cutworms are hosts for numerous parasitoid wasps (including species of Braconidae, Ichneumonidae, and Eulophidae) and flies (including Tachinidae), with rates of parasitism sometimes as high as 80 percent. They are also hosts for fungi, entomopathogenic nematodes and viruses, and prey for ground beetles.
