= Sourgrass =

Sourgrass is a common name given to several plant species which have a sour taste. Most are in fact not grasses:

== True grasses ==
- Digitaria insularis (sourgrass)
- Paspalum conjugatum (carabao grass)

== Other ==
- Oxalis species (woodsorrels) of the Oxalidaceae, namely:
  - Oxalis corniculata (creeping woodsorrel)
  - Oxalis pes-caprae (Bermuda-buttercup)
  - Oxalis grandis (large yellow woodsorrel)
  - Oxalis montana (mountain woodsorrel)
  - Oxalis stricta (yellow woodsorrel)
- Rumex acetosella (sorrel) of the Polygonaceae
