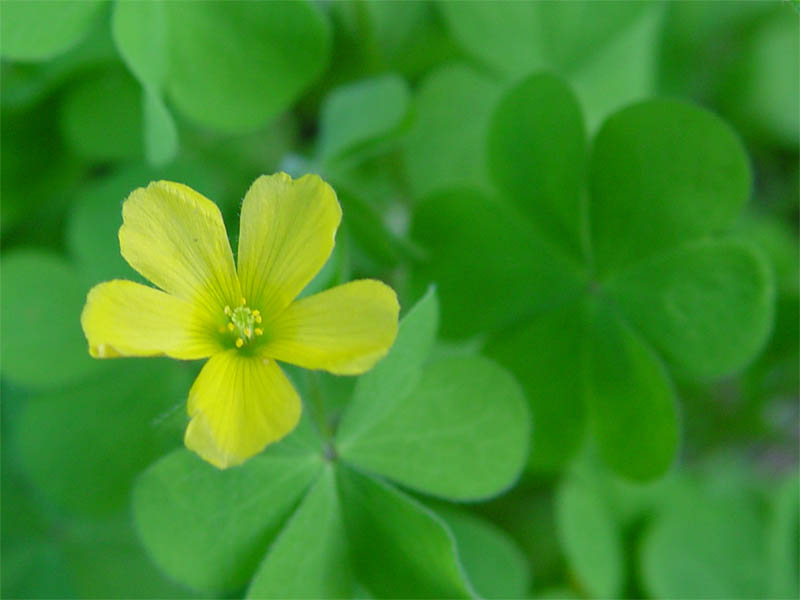

Scientific classification
- Kingdom: Plantae
- Clade: Tracheophytes
- Clade: Angiosperms
- Clade: Eudicots
- Clade: Rosids
- Order: Oxalidales
- Family: Oxalidaceae
- Genus: Oxalis
- Species: O. albicans

Binomial name
- Oxalis albicans Kunth 1822

Synonyms
- Acetosella albicans (Kunth) Kuntze; Oxalis corniculata subsp. albicans (Kunth) Lourteig; Xanthoxalis albicans (Kunth) Small

= Oxalis albicans =

Radishroot woodsorrel

Species of flowering plant

Oxalis albicans, commonly known as radishroot woodsorrel, is North American species of perennial herbs in the woodsorrel family. It is widespread in Mexico (from Baja California east to Coahuila and south as far as Oaxaca) and the southwestern United States (California, New Mexico, Arizona, western Texas).

In California, the species grows in chaparral, coastal sage scrub, and other habitats, from sea level to elevations of 2,296 feet (700 m). The plant is found in the California Coast Ranges, Sierra Nevada, Transverse Ranges, Peninsular Ranges, and other regions of the state.

== Former subspecies ==
Currently recognized Oxalis species, that were formerly considered Oxalis albicans subspecies, include:

- Oxalis californica, formerly Oxalis albicans ssp. californica — California yellow sorrel; native to coastal sage scrub and chaparral and montane chaparral and woodlands habitats in Southern California, the Channel Islands, and northwestern Baja California; sea level to 2,035 metres (6,677 ft).
- Oxalis pilosa, formerly Oxalis albicans ssp. pilosa — hairy wood sorrel; from Baja California, through California, to British Columbia; below 1,800 metres (5,900 ft).
