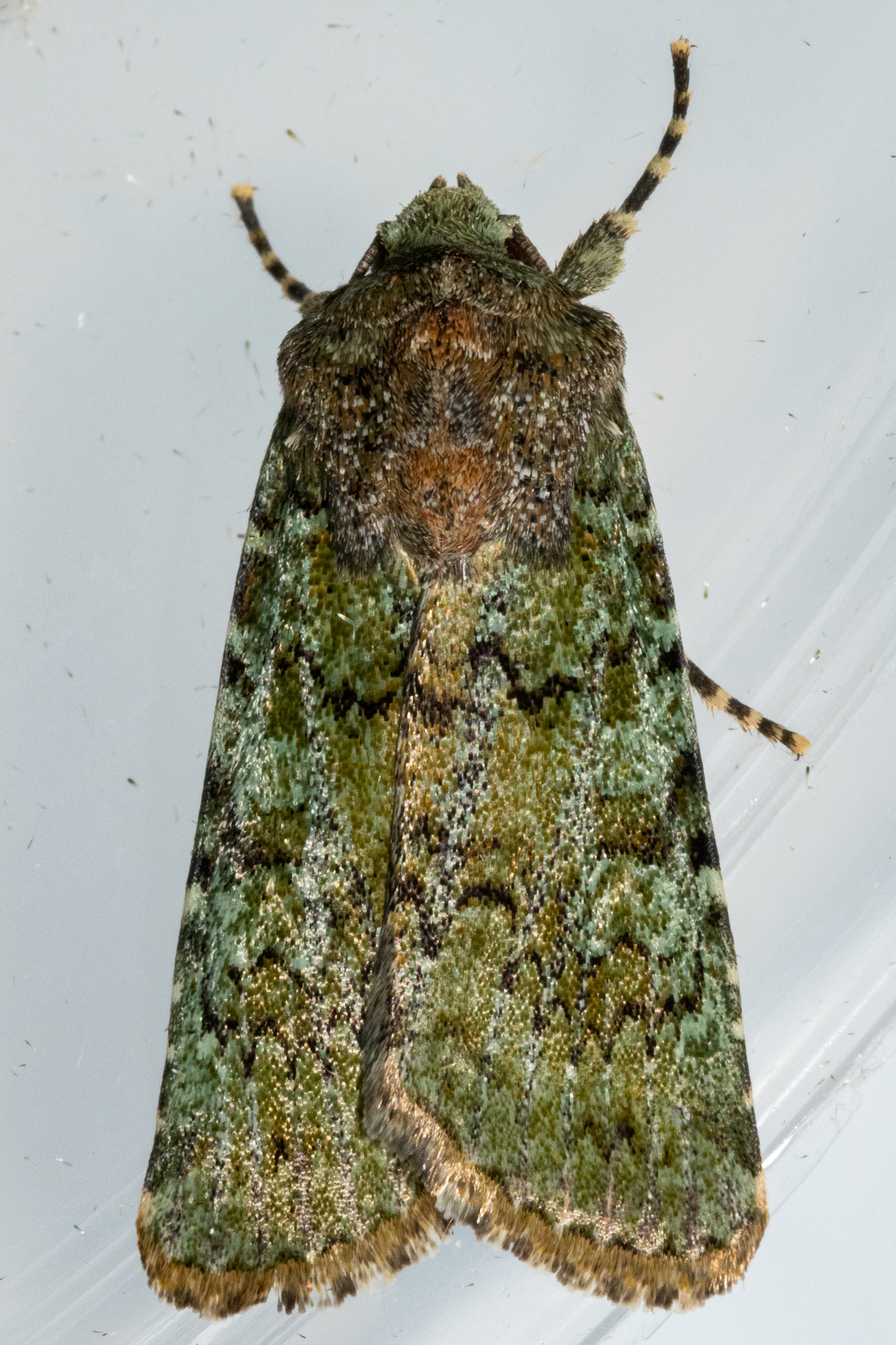
- Klugeana philoxalis

Scientific classification
- Domain: Eukaryota
- Kingdom: Animalia
- Phylum: Arthropoda
- Class: Insecta
- Order: Lepidoptera
- Superfamily: Noctuoidea
- Family: Noctuidae
- Subfamily: Cuculliinae
- Genus: Klugeana

= Klugeana =

Genus of moths

Klugeana is a genus of moths of the family Noctuidae.

The South African species Klugeana philoxalis has been proposed as a possible biocontrol agent for dealing with invasive Oxalis pes-caprae in countries where it is a problem. Like many Noctuids, Klugeana philoxalis has larvae that feed nocturnally and hide by day. If suddenly illuminated when feeding in the dark, they drop to the ground.
