= The Backwoodsman =

American bi-monthly independent magazine

The Backwoodsman, an American independent, bi-monthly print and digital magazine, is dedicated to the preservation of Old Frontier Living, with articles, information and how-to projects that explore primitive hunting and fishing, tools and weapons lore, wilderness survival and many other topics associated with this unique period of North American history.

From the beginning, The Backwoodsman has remained nonpolitical and nonpartisan. The publication is guided by its motto, “the magazine for the 21st century frontiersman.” With an international circulation of 260,000, as well as a digital edition launched in 2018, The Backwoodsman is among the top 10 outdoor recreation magazines in North America and is ranked by the anarchy-capitalist site LewRockwell.com as one of the three best survivalist magazines.

== Overview and History ==
Charlie Richie Sr. and Lynne Richie created The Backwoodsman in 1979 in Livingston, Texas. Headquarters moved to Westcliffe, Colorado in 1988 and then to Fulton, Texas in 2005. The magazine is now based in Santa Fe, New Mexico.

The Backwoodsman's current owner, publisher and editor, Charlie Richie Jr., took the helm in September 2021 after his father, Charlie Richie Sr., who had been editor and publisher for 42 years, died on August 28, 2021. His mother, Lynne Richie, who served as the publication's business manager for 42 years, died on November 27, 2021. Charlie Richie Jr. served as associate publisher for 26 years before officially taking over the publication in 2021.

The magazine is known for covering a broad range of subjects, including Campcraft, Homesteading, Survival, History, Off-Grid Living, Primitive Living Skills, Camping, Hunting, Knives, Muzzleloading, Woodslore, Buschcraft, and Self-Reliance.

The Backwoodsman has also used the following monikers: The Magazine For The Twentieth Century Frontiersman, The Magazine for The Twenty-First Century Frontiersman & Richie's Magazine. Charlie Richie Jr's two sisters are former employees. The Backwoodsman is a true family owned and operated publication for most of the 42 years of existence.

=== Charlie Richie Sr. ===
A professional bass fisherman who was on the Pro Bass tour in the 1970s, Richie Sr. also was a freelance outdoor writer for Fishing Facts and other magazines. After getting passed over for an editor’s job due to his lack of a college degree, Richie was inspired to create a magazine that featured all of the subjects that he was immersing himself in, including mountain men history, trapping and survival skills. He was heavily influenced by the movie “Jeremiah Johnson".

Purchasing an old printer for $50, he produced the first issue of The Backwoodsman in the fall of 1979, in 56 black-and-white pages. The current format is 88 pages. What began as a quarterly publication moved to the bi-monthly format in 1982 and was purchased via subscriptions and sold at various retail outlets. In 1994, The Backwoodsman's distribution expanded to newsstands, grocery stores and sporting goods stores, across the United States and Canada.

The Backwoodsman transitioned from black-&-white to a full color publication in 2001. Between 2005 and 2012, the number of copies printed per issue grew from 40,000 to 150,000. Despite the growth, the magazine has always taken pride in maintaining a ratio of 70% editorial content to 30% percent advertising.

The Backwoodsman has always collaborated with prominent artists and features their work often on covers. Western frontier artists who've contributed to the magazine include Paul Calle, Chris Calle, Clark Kelley Price, Gary Lynn Roberts, Andrew Knez Jr., Denny Karchner and Steve White. Well-known writers also have contributed to the publication including Larry Dean Olsen, Christopher Nyerges, Steve Watts, David Prescott, Mors Kochanski, Tony Nestor, James Ballou and Thomas J. Epel.

The magazine published a popular series of articles between 1980 and 1990 that featured some of the last known Mountain Men who had embraced the lifestyle of mountain men in the 1800s, and are now considered legends, such as Sylvan Hart, "Cascade" George Mason and "Wild" Bill Moreland.

Richie, who wrote hundreds of articles for the publication, was a leading figure in the back-to-earth movement, which started in the 1970s. He created a reader-supported community by encouraging other people who were interested in this lifestyle to share their story and knowledge with other readers.

=== Charlie Richie Jr. ===
Charlie Richie Jr. is the current owner, publisher, editor, digital editor, and media relations director for the publication. He has worked full-time with the magazine since 1995, serving as associate publisher, special assignments editor, advertising director and media relations director, until he became the owner in 2021.

Richie Jr. also started his own publication, Earthworks Magazine, at the same time that he started working at The Backwoodsman. A sister publication to The Backwoodsman, Earthworks Magazine was dedicated to sustainable living, with 30 issues published between 1995 and 2000 and a circulation of 14,000, with distribution across North America. He folded the magazine to devote more time to The Backwoodsman. Every so often, articles from Earthworks Magazine are reprinted in The Backwoodsman.

Richie Jr. has written numerous articles for The Backwoodsman, including a profile in the July/August 2012 issue of the famous Idaho hermit Richard "Dugout Dick" Zimmerman, who lived off-the-grid in caves, which he dug out on the banks of the Salmon River, from 1948 until his death in 2010. He also wrote a three-part series about American treasure hunter Mel Fisher, published in the July/August 2014 issue titled “The Search For The Atocha: The Legend of Mel Fisher”. Richie Jr. traveled to Key West, Florida to visit the Atocha site in the Gulf of Mexico and also interviewed Mel’s son, Kim Fisher for the article.

He has interviewed survival experts Les Stroud, Cody Lundin, Creek Stewart, Dave Canterbury, EJ Snyder, Mykel Hawke, Josh Kirk and musician JJ Grey, who were each featured on the magazine's cover. For the July/August 2013 cover, former All-Pro world champion NFL defensive end for the Pittsburgh Steelers Brett Keisel, was painted and portrayed as a mountain man by western frontier artist Denny Karchner.

Some of the noteworthy people interviewed by Richie Jr. have become regular contributors to The Backwoodsman, including Creek Stewart, Dave Canterbury, EJ Snyder and Josh Kirk.

=== In popular culture ===
Charlie Richie Jr. is also a freelance outdoor unscripted TV producer who has worked in TV development for several production companies since 2012. An article titled “Rafting In Alaska” by Neil Eklund published in the July/August 2014 issue of The Backwoodsman was the inspiration for the show “Yukon River Run,” which was produced by Gurney Productions for the National Geographic Channel. It ran for one season, from July 20 through September 15, 2015. Richie Jr. was working with Gurney Productions, developing show concepts at that time.

American Professional wrestler Brock Lesnar performed a segment on “WWE Raw” on the USA Network on July 30, 2018, where he was reading a copy of the July/August 2018 issue of The Backwoodsman backstage. Lesnar, an avid outdoorsman, was pretending not to care about Pro Wrestling when his manager, Paul Heyman, entered the room, frantically calling to question what Lesnar was doing reading The Backwoodsman. That segment turned into one of the most popular memes of 2018 on social media.

=== The Digital Age ===
In 2000, Richie Jr. founded Backwoods Mercantile as the official store of The Backwoodsman magazine. Backwoods Mercantile is now also a Limited Liability Company (LLC) that publishes The Backwoodsman. The store sells back and current issues of the magazine along with a product line that includes books, knives, camping and survival gear. The magazine launched a digital edition with the May/June 2018 issue. It also has published four books in its series “Best of The Backwoodsman: Volumes 1 & 2, 3, 4 & 5. The Backwoodsman is sold at Cabela’s, Bass Pro Shop, Kroger Grocery Chains, Walmart, Barnes & Noble, Dick's Sporting Goods and many other businesses.
