= Hank Shaw (author) =

American chef and writer

- Born: July 30, 1970 (age 54); Westfield, New Jersey, U.S.
- Occupation(s): Chef, author, outdoorsman
- Website: honest-food.net

Henry Alexander Shaw (born July 30, 1970) is an American chef, author, and outdoorsman who runs the wild foods website Hunter Angler Gardener Cook. He is the author of five cookbooks about preparing fish and wild game for the table: Hunt Gather Cook, Duck Duck Goose, Buck Buck Moose, Pheasant Quail Cottontail and Hook Line and Supper.

== Early life ==
Shaw was born in Westfield, New Jersey, the youngest of four children. He graduated from Stony Brook University on Long Island in 1992, then earned a Master's in history from the University of Wisconsin-Madison.

After an initial few years working as a line cook and sous chef in restaurants in Madison, Wisconsin, Shaw became a newspaper reporter, first for the Madison Times weekly newspaper, then to a series of weeklies on Long Island, including the Islip Bulletin and the Suffolk County News.

Shaw later worked at the Potomac News in Woodbridge, Virginia, then the Fredericksburg Free Lance-Star before moving to Minnesota in 2002 to work at the St. Paul Pioneer Press. His final newspaper stint was at the Stockton Record in California, where he worked until 2008 as the paper's Sacramento Bureau Chief.

== Media career ==
=== Television ===
Shaw has appeared on numerous television shows, including Andrew Zimmern’s Bizarre Foods, Mike Rowe's Somebody’s Gotta Do It, Steven Rinella's Meateater, and Randy Newberg's Fresh Tracks.

=== Books ===
- Hunt, Gather, Cook: Finding the Forgotten Feast

Shaw’s first book was released in 2011 by Rodale Books. It is a primer on the wild world and covers hunting, fishing and foraging. The New York Times praised the book: “In Hunt, Gather, Cook, [Shaw] makes a powerful argument for joining him in a few of those pursuits, if only to become aware of the great bounty that surrounds us in the natural world, even when we live in urban environments—and perhaps particularly then.”

- Duck, Duck, Goose: Recipes and Techniques for Ducks and Geese, both Wild and Domesticated

Shaw's second book was released by Ten Speed Press in October 2013. It covers all things waterfowl and was named as one of the Cookbooks of the Year in 2013 by Amazon.com.

- Buck, Buck, Moose: Recipes and Techniques for Cooking Deer, Elk, Moose, Antelope and Other Antlered Things

Published in September 2016, this is a comprehensive cookbook covering all forms of venison, and is the first book Shaw released via his publishing company, H&H Books.

- Pheasant, Quail, Cottontail: Upland Birds and Small Game from Field to Feast

Released in March 2018, this is Shaw's third book, also published by Shaw's company. It covers all the upland birds, doves, pigeons and all the small mammals commonly hunted in North America.

- Hook, Line and Supper: New Techniques and Master Recipes for Everything Caught in Lakes, Rivers and Streams, and at Sea

Released in May 2021, this is the latest book published by Shaw's company. It covers all the fresh and saltwater fish species, and focuses on using both to improve cooking skills fish and seafood cooks.

=== Website ===
Hunter Angler Gardener Cook, Shaw's popular wild foods website, has a focus on foods that can be foraged, fished, or hunted around Shaw's home region of the San Francisco Bay Area. The site won the James Beard Award for best food blog in 2013, by which time his food writing had developed a "national following." The blog was established in 2007 and had 1500 recipes as of 2024.

== Awards and nominations ==
Shaw won numerous journalism awards in his early career, and was first nominated for a James Beard Award for his blog Hunter Angler Gardener Cook in 2009. He was nominated again in 2010, and won the award in 2013.

Shaw also won Best Blog from the International Association of Culinary Professionals in 2010 and 2011

His work was featured in the anthology Best Food Writing in 2012 and 2013.

In addition, Shaw's foraging column in Sactown Magazine won a national award by the society for city and regional magazines in 2014.

Buck Buck Moose won Best Book from the Outdoor Writers Association of America in 2016.
