= Steven Rinella =

American outdoorsman and television personality

- Born: Steven John Rinella; February 13, 1974 (age 52); Twin Lake, Michigan, U.S.
- Education: Muskegon Community College; Lake Superior State University; Grand Valley State University (BA in English); University of Montana (MFA in creative non-fiction)
- Occupations: Outdoorsman, television personality, writer, trapper
- Television: MeatEater
- Spouse: Catherine Finch
- Relatives: Matt Rinella (location unknown)

Steven Rinella (born February 13, 1974) is an American outdoorsman, conservationist, writer, and television personality known for translating the hunting and fishing lifestyle to a wide variety of audiences.

== Early life ==
Steven Rinella, who is of Italian descent, was born in Twin Lake, Michigan, on February 13, 1974. He grew up in Twin Lake along with his two older brothers, who were taught to hunt and fish at an early age by their father.

== Career ==
=== Television ===
==== The Wild Within ====
Prior to MeatEater, Rinella hosted The Wild Within, an 8-episode series on the Travel Channel.

==== MeatEater ====
Rinella is the host of MeatEater, a weekly half-hour hunting show. The show ran for six seasons on Sportsman Channel before moving to Netflix in 2018. The show is based on Rinella's hunting and fishing adventures in such locations as Montana (deer, elk); Alaska (waterfowl, mountain goat, Dall sheep, caribou, black bear, moose); Mexico (wild turkey, buffalo); New Zealand (tahr, chamois, red stag); Arizona (mountain lion, Coues deer); Wisconsin (white-tailed deer, rabbit, beaver, muskrat); and California (wild pigs, quail, and turkey).

The show offers a defense of hunting and makes the case that hunters are obligated to be stewards of the land and protectors of their chosen prey species. The episodes include sometimes artful food preparations after the hunt. Examples include a deer's heart wrapped in caul fat and roasted over a fire, javelina meat boiled inside the animal's own stomach, and more common preparations. The series premiered on January 1, 2012, and has completed its eleventh season.

In 2018, he directed and starred in the film Stars In The Sky: A Hunting Story. The film follows a group of hunters as they grapple with complexities in the wild.

==== Hunting History with Steven Rinella ====
Premiered in January 2025 on the History Channel.

==== Other ====
Rinella appeared in the 2023 Ken Burns documentary The American Buffalo.

=== Books ===
- The Scavenger's Guide to Haute Cuisine (2006)
- American Buffalo: In Search of a Lost Icon (2009)
- Meat Eater: Adventures from the Life of an American Hunter (2013)
- The Complete Guide to Hunting, Butchering, and Cooking Wild Game (2015)
- The MeatEater Fish and Game Cookbook (2018)
- The Meateater Guide To Wilderness Skills and Survival (2020)
- Outdoor Kids in an Inside World: Getting Your Family Out of the House and Radically Engaged with Nature (2022)
- Catch a Crayfish, Count the Stars: Fun Projects, Skills, and Adventures for Outdoor Kids (2023)
- MeatEater's American History: The Long Hunters (1761-1775) (2024)
- The MeatEater Outdoor Cookbook: Wild Game Recipes for the Grill, Smoker, Campstove, and Campfire (2024)
- MeatEater's American History: The Mountain Men (1806-1840) (2025)
- MeatEater's American History: The Hide Hunters (1865-1883) (2025)
- MeatEater's American History: The Alaskans (1896-1941) (2026)

Other

Other publications featuring him include Outside, Field and Stream, Wall Street Journal, New York Times, Glamour, Bowhunter, O The Oprah Magazine, the New Yorker, American Heritage, Fly Fisherman, and others.

=== Podcasts ===
Rinella hosts a podcast called The MeatEater Podcast that ranks among the top ten sports podcasts. In addition to hosting his own podcast, Rinella is also a frequent guest on The Joe Rogan Experience podcast hosted by Joe Rogan. the two have also been hunting companions with Rogan appearing on Rinella's television program MeatEater.

=== MeatEater, Inc. ===
In February 2018, Rinella formally founded MeatEater, Inc. in Bozeman, Montana. It operates as an outdoor lifestyle brand and media company that focuses on hunting, fishing, cooking and conservation. The company also acts as owner and retailer for various outdoor brands, including First Lite, FHF Gear, Phelps Game Calls & Dave Smith Decoys. MeatEater, Inc. had over $100 million in revenue in 2024.

== Awards and nominations ==
In 2012, MeatEater was nominated for Sportsman Channel's Sportsman Choice Awards for Best New Series, Best Host, Best Hunting Show, and Best Educational Show.

A year earlier, The Wild Within was a James Beard Awards finalist for best Television Program, On Location.

American Buffalo won a number of awards, including the Sigurd F. Olson Nature Writing Award and the Pacific Northwest Booksellers Association Award. It was also an Amazon Editors'pick for Best History and one of The San Francisco Chronicleʼs best fifty non-fiction books of 2008.

In 2025 the University of Montana awarded Rinella an Honorary Doctorate of Forestry and Conservation.
