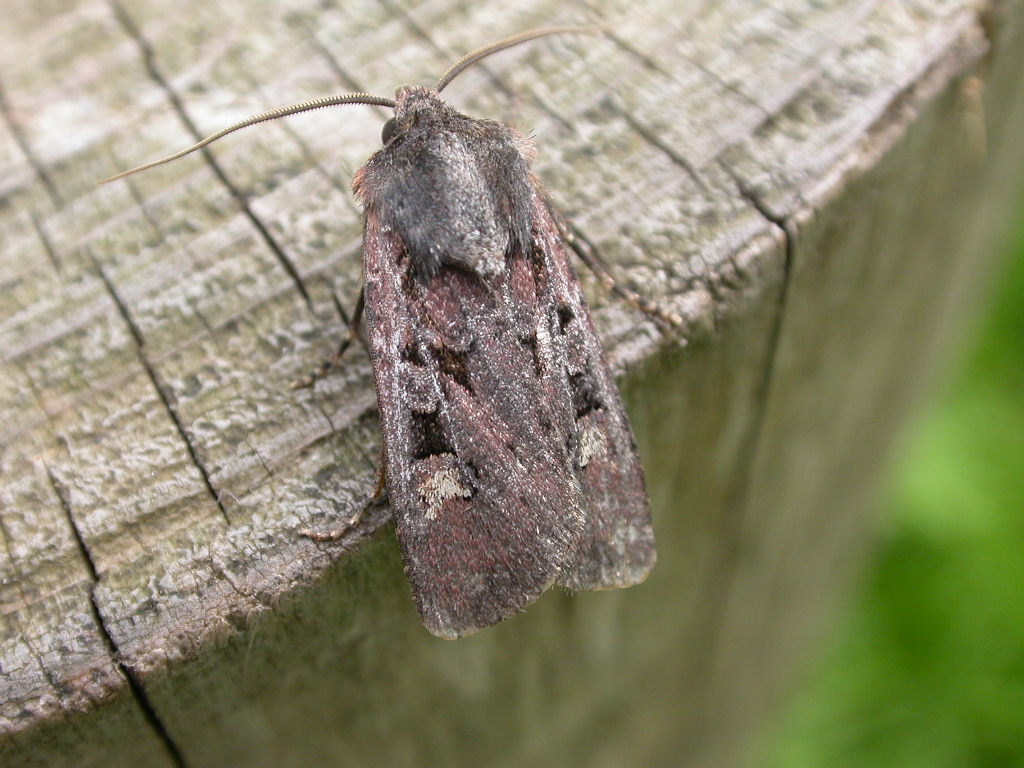

Scientific classification
- Kingdom: Animalia
- Phylum: Arthropoda
- Class: Insecta
- Order: Lepidoptera
- Superfamily: Noctuoidea
- Family: Noctuidae
- Genus: Euxoa
- Species: E. obelisca

Binomial name
- Euxoa obelisca Denis & Schiffermüller, 1775

= Euxoa obelisca =

Square-spot dart

Species of moth

Euxoa obelisca, the square-spot dart, is a moth of the family Noctuidae. It is found in the Palearctic realm (Europe, Central Asia, North Africa Asia minor).

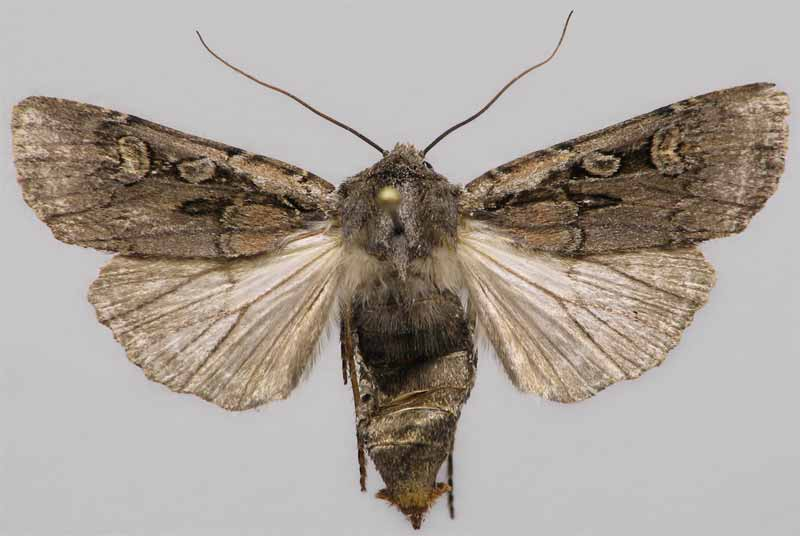
Mounted

== Technical description and variation ==
Forewing purplish brown; costa pale to outer line: cell dark brown; stigmata large, greyish ochreous: the claviform dark; hindwing in male white, with narrow grey shade along margin, in female more or less grey-tinged throughout.- in ab. fictilis Hbn. the forewing is more variegated, the submarginal line preceded by a row of distinct black teeth; - ab. ruris Hbn., larger than typical, reddish grey or reddish brown, with or without the pale costa: stigmata large and pale: - ab. villiersii Guen. is also larger than typical; forewing ochreous grey with costa and both stigmata whitish, darker in the female; — ab. plectoides Guen. the same size as type, forewing with more acute apex, deep shining violet brown, with traces of subterminal only: costa and stigmata (which are small) pale testaceous; the orbicular somewhat angulated, the reniform constricted in middle: claviform obsolete: the cell deep black; hindwing very dark; described from a female only from Lapland; omitted by Staudinger, but probably a distinct species: a very distinct form from the Urals, which may be called ab. carbonis nov.[Warren] has the ground colour purplish black, with the costal streak and upper stigmata pale and the cell deep black: all the lines indistinct: several examples of both sexes sent from Uralsk by M. Bartel.

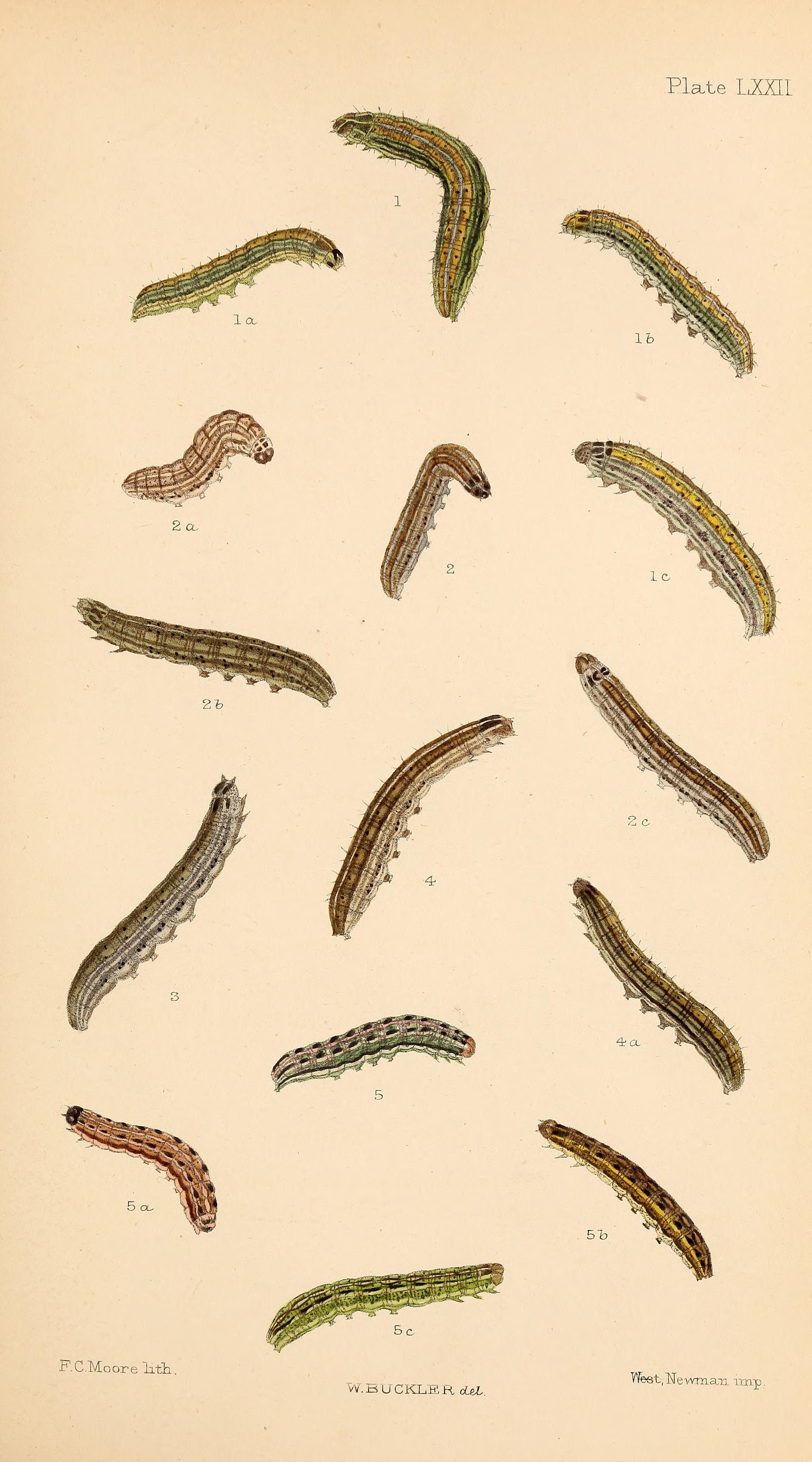
Figs 4, 4a larva after last moult

The caterpillar is obscure greyish or brownish, with a dark-edged pale line along the middle of the dorsum, and a dusky line on each side of it; low down on the sides is another dusky line.

== Biology ==
The moth flies from July to October depending on the location.

The larvae feed on various herbaceous plants, such as Helianthemum nummularium and Galium species.

== Similar species ==
Euxoa obelisca is difficult to certainly distinguish from its congeners. See Townsend et al.

- Euxoa tritici (Linnaeus, 1761)
- Euxoa nigricans (Linnaeus, 1761)
- Euxoa cursoria (Hufnagel, 1766)
