= Ardeer nitroglycerine factory =

Explosive factory in Scotland

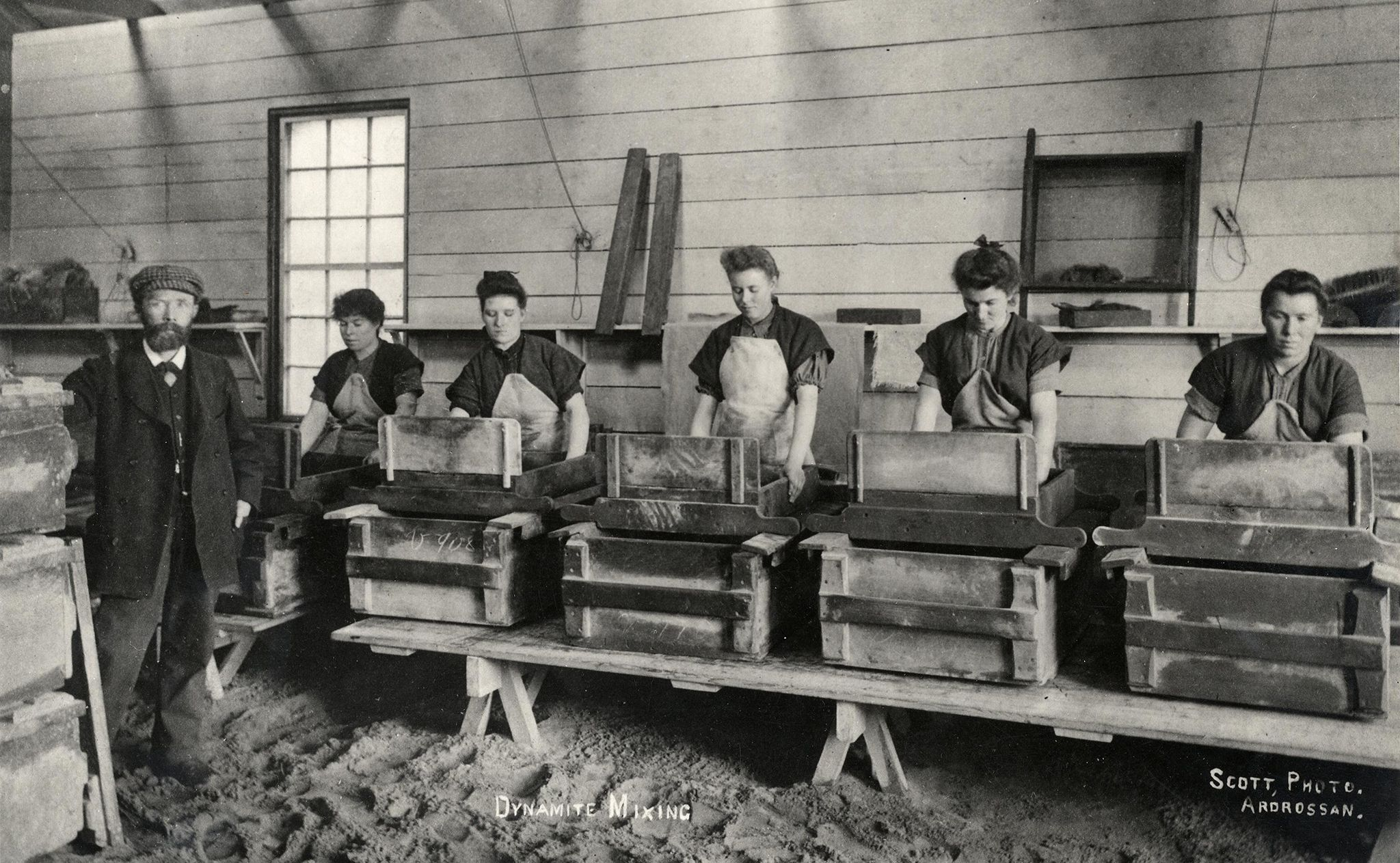
- Women mixing dynamite at the factory in 1897

- Ardeer nitroglycerine factory
- Built: 1871
- Operated: 12 January 1873
- Location: Ardeer peninsula, Stevenston, Scotland
- Coordinates: 55.62149°N 4.72352°W
- Industry: Dynamite and explosives
- Employees: 13000
- Area: 2000+ acres
- Owner: Alfred Nobel
- Defunct: 1990s

Ardeer nitroglycerine factory was an explosives factory, located on the Ardeer Peninsula, Ardeer North Ayrshire, Scotland that was built by Alfred Bernhard Nobel and operated from 1871 to the 1990s.

== Patents ==
In 1863 and 1864, Alfred Nobel was awarded UK patents on the use of nitroglycerine as an explosive. On 13 February 1866, when Nobel came to Britain to promote the use of his main product, nitroglycerine and search for finances for a new manufacturing plant, the explosive already had a bad reputation with the British government. This was amply illustrated the following month on 3 April 1866, when the SS European, a 1700-ton steamship carrying 70 crates of nitroglycerine, spontaneously blew up in Colón, Panama, killing 50 sailors (sources vary) and destroying the ship; one of many accidents involving the explosive at the time. The most important market for the nitroglycerine explosive was in Wales, where it was being regularly used. However, the UK government had continual misgivings about the product believing it was too dangerous to use and transport. Finally they decided on 11 August 1869 to ban its use, production and sale in the UK. In the interim, Nobel had developed a new composite explosive that he called Dynamite and demonstrated its use in Surrey, in several experiments to show it was safer. On 12 February 1869, a patent for Dynamite was finally awarded by the British government.

== Formation ==
Nobel was unable to secure funding from investors in England for his new factory. Then in 1871, Nobel met Glasgow businessman John Downie, at the time, the General Manager of the Glasgow shipbuilding firm the Fairfield Shipbuilding and Engineering Company (FSEC) and Falkirk chemist George McRoberts, who in 1870 had established "Westquarter Chemical Company" at Westquarter in Falkirk that mainly produced sulphuric acid. Together Downie and MacRoberts raised £24000 to fund the new explosives business that was suitably titled "The British Dynamite Company". Its head office was located at 7 Royal Bank Place in Glasgow and its chairman was Glasgow shipbuilder, Charles Randolph (1809-1878), also of the FSEC.

== Peninsula ==
Nobel choose the location of his new factory himself at Ardeer peninsula, located between Irvine and the parish of Stevenston in North Ayrshire. The site, a peninsula with the River Garnock to the east and the River Irvine to the south and Irvine Bay and Firth of Clyde to the west, was ideal for Nobel. It was both isolated, yet had good transport links, with a railway close by enabling a station to be built on site, and the sea was readily available for the construction of a wharf. At the same time, the land itself was mostly sand dunes, that could be easily moved to build embankments and placements. In a letter to his brother, Nobel described the site as

Picture to yourself everlasting bleak sand dunes with no buildings. Only rabbits find a little nourishment here; they eat a substance which, quite unjustifiably goes by the name of grass. It is a sand desert where the wind always blows, often howls, filling the ears with sand. Between us and America there is nothing but water, a sea whose mighty waves are always raging and foaming. Now you will have some idea of the place where I am living. Without work, the place would be intolerable.

== Construction ==
Nobel bought 100acres of land on the peninsula from the Earl of Eglinton and began constructing the explosives factory. The first brick laid in 1871 was supervised by Nobel and his colleague, the Swedish chemist Alarik Liedbeck who designed the factory. It took around two years for the factory to be built within the landward side of the peninsula on the 100 acre plot. The first buildings to be constructed on the site were the Nitroglycerine hill, followed by the Dynamite plant, nitric acid plant and the laboratory. In 1873, George McRoberts became the general manager of the Ardeer factory.

== Production ==
On 13 January 1873, the production of nitroglycerine began, producing an initial 336 kilograms in what was termed a "charge".

== Women ==
Women loading dynamite cartridges using the Dynamite cartridging machines, circa 1925

From the very beginning in 1873, Nobel employed women to work in the factory, even in the danger areas where they prepared gun cotton, nitroglycerine and filled dynamite cartridges. The factory when it opened originally employed 80 men and 30 women. However, by the turn of the century the labour force had grown to 1300 people, of which 200 were women.

== Factory visit ==
In 1897, the American journalist and playwright H. J. W. Dam visted the factory.

== Gallery ==
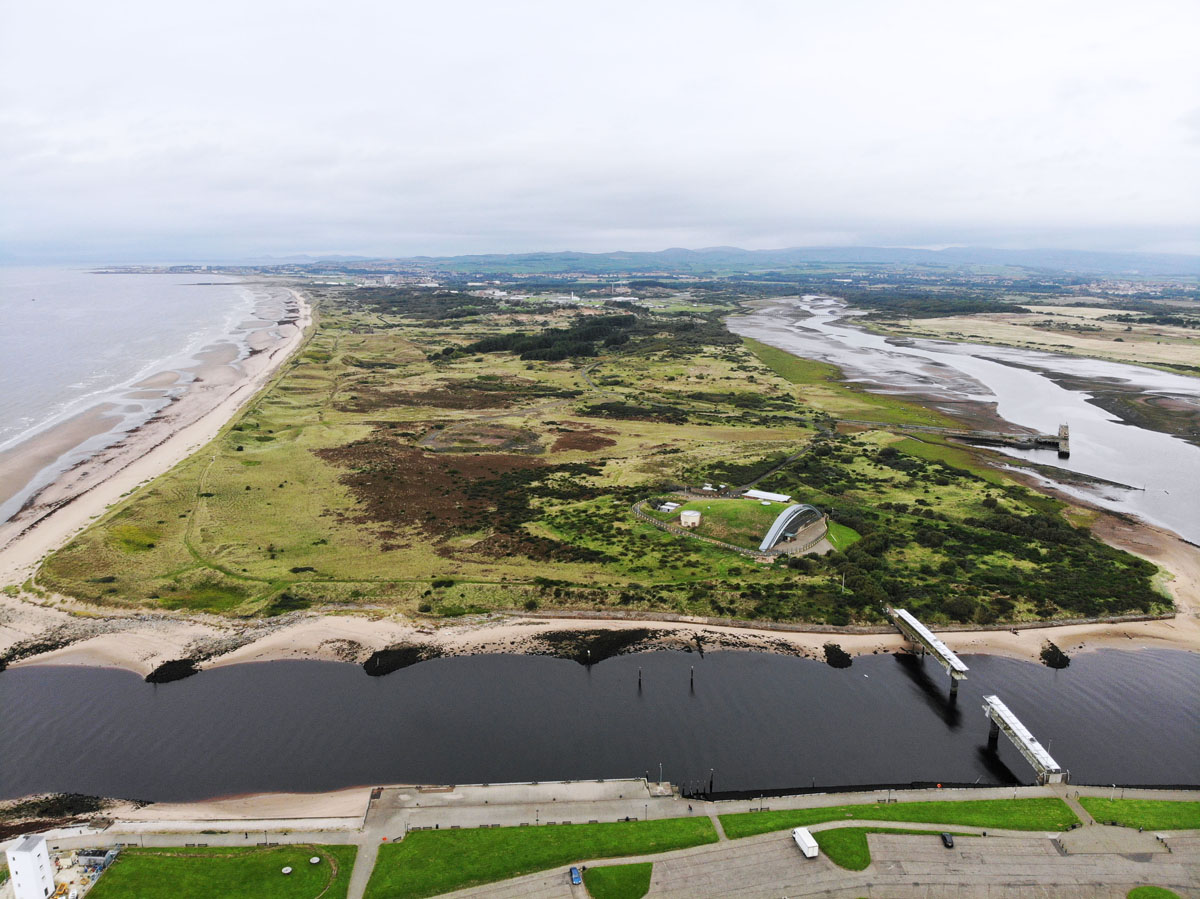
The tip of Ardeer Peninsula

Interior view of building built on a hill where nitro-glycerine was made, 1880

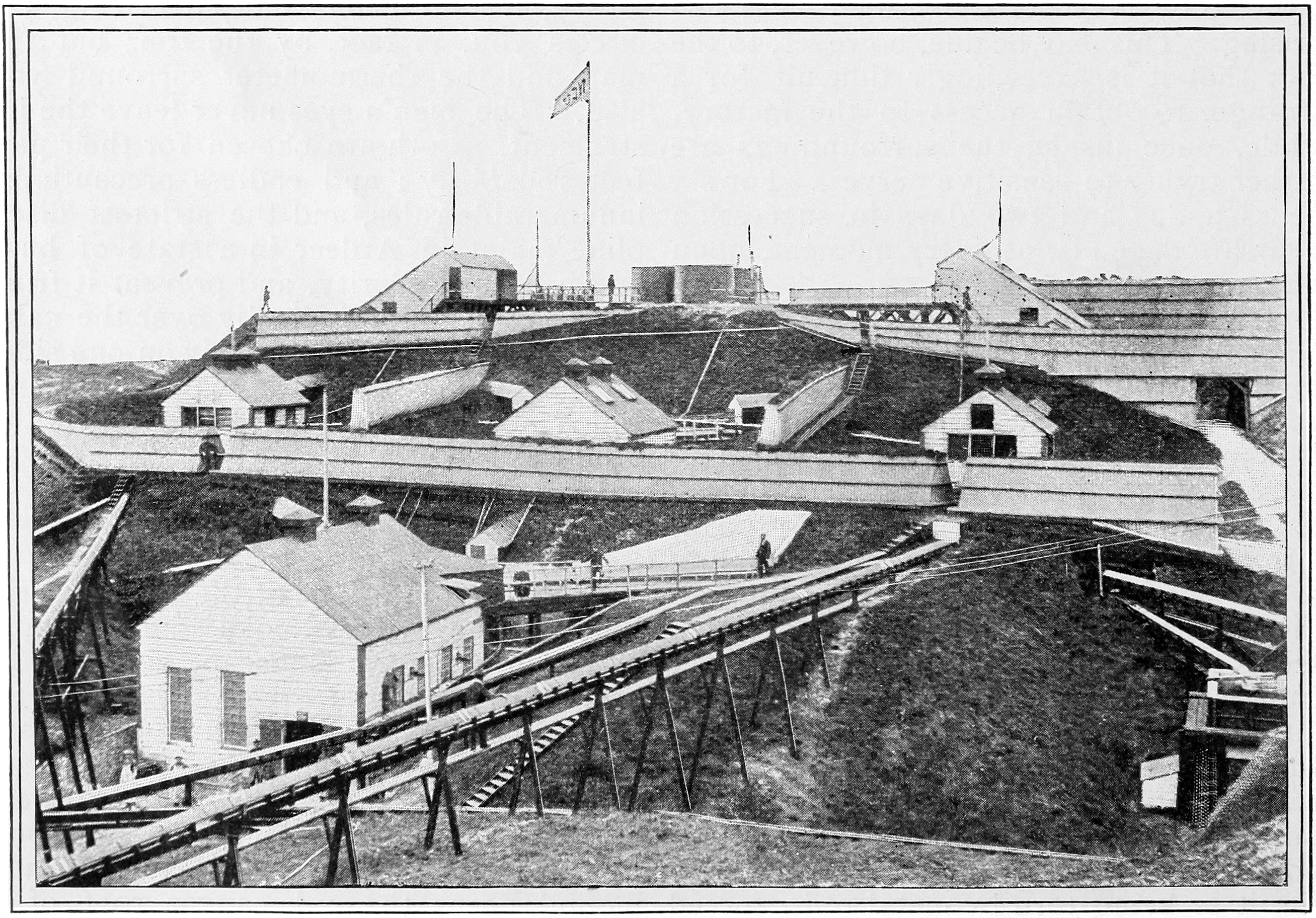
Exterior view of the nitro-glycerine hill. Note the gutters used to enable the flow of nitroglycerine downhill, 1893

The nitric acid plant with the gas works immediately next to it.

A line of Lancashire boilers in the Ardeer boiler station c. 1925

== See also ==
- Nobel Enterprises
