= Ardeer, North Ayrshire =

Ardeer
- Location within North Ayrshire
- Population: 9,129 (2001 census) est. 8,990 (2006)
- OS grid reference: NS282406
- Council area: North Ayrshire
- Lieutenancy area: Ayrshire and Arran
- Country: Scotland
- Sovereign state: United Kingdom
- Post town: STEVENSTON
- Postcode district: KA20
- Dialling code: 01294
- Police: Scotland
- Fire: Scottish
- Ambulance: Scottish
- UK Parliament: North Ayrshire and Arran
- Scottish Parliament: Cunninghame South

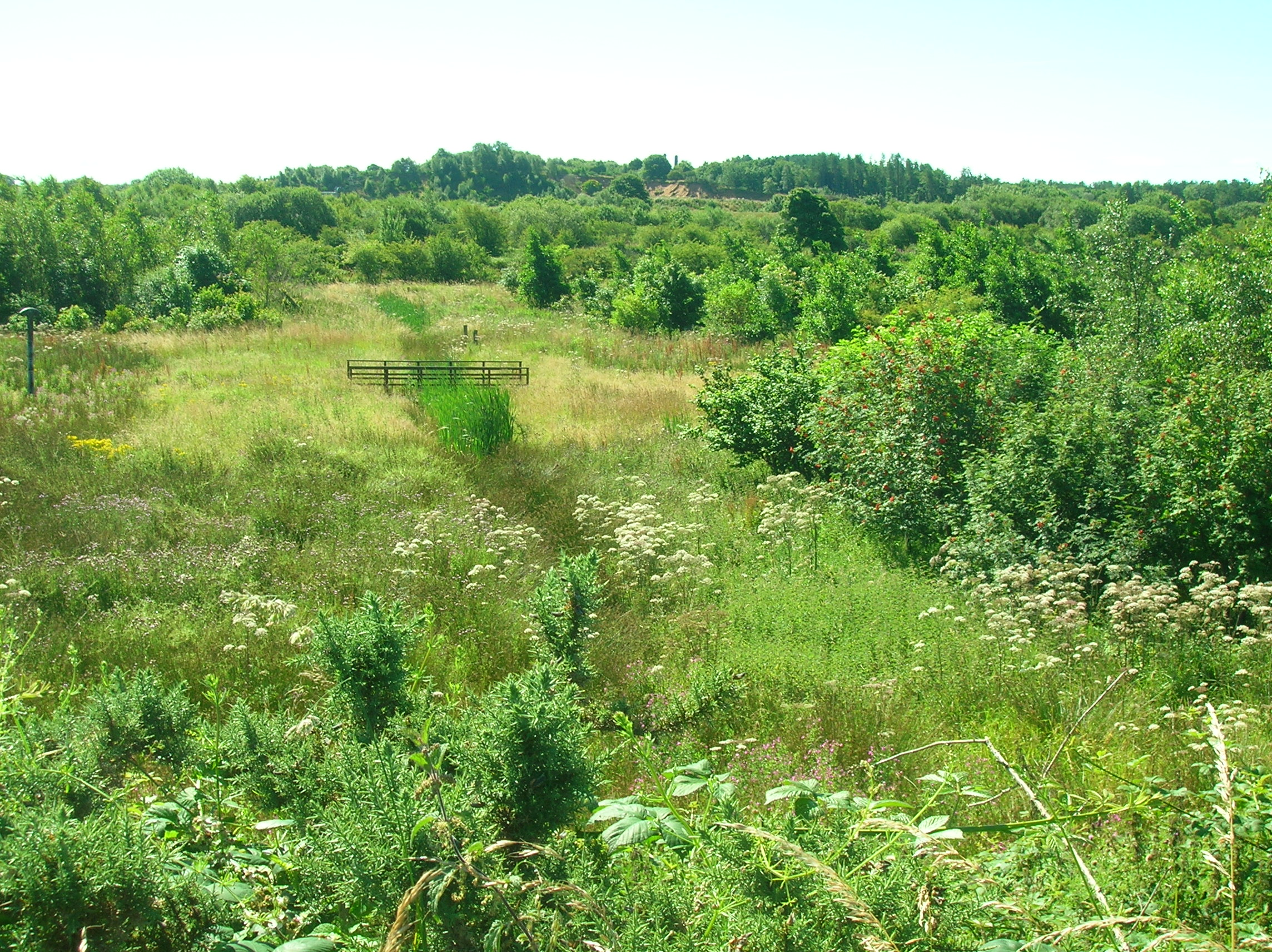
Misk Knowes on the old island of Ardeer looking across the old sea channel.

Ardeer was a small town now officially incorporated into Stevenston on the Ardeer peninsula, in the parish of Stevenston, North Ayrshire, originally an island and later its extensive sand dune system became the site of Nobel Explosives, a dominant global supplier of explosives to the mining and quarrying industries and a major player in the design and development of products for the chemical and defence industries during the 20th century, the company was also a subsidiary of Nobel Enterprises. The peninsula is now part of North Ayrshire's most important area for Biodiversity.

== Geography ==
=== Ardeer Island ===
Ardeer was once an island with a sea channel running along to exit in the vicinity of Auchenharvie Academy. Blaeu's map of 1654, based on Timothy Pont’s map of circa 1600 clearly shows a small island with the settlements of Ardeer, Dubbs, Bogend, Longford, Snodgrass, Lugton Mill and Bartonholm all being on or near the coastline. The island was small and extended no further than Bartonholm, nowhere near the size of the present-day Ardeer peninsula. The Lugton Water opened into the bay at that time and not into the Garnock. Robert Gordon's map of 1636-52 highlights the coastline as being much further inland than at present and the island of Ardeer is not shown, cross-hatching or crossing out being shown. Roy. It was at around this time that the old harbour at Seagatefoot was finally abandoned a new harbour built at Fullarton in 1665 and the extreme sand movements recorded in relation to the old harbour may have also choked the sea channel that had made Ardeer an island.

A map of 1872 shows a sizeable island at the tip of the Ardeer peninsula that included the site of the present day Big Idea complex. This island is not recorded on the later Ordnance Survey maps and was therefore of a transient nature due to the shifting sands, storm derived blow outs, etc. typical of large sand dune and estuary systems.

As late as 1902 it was recorded that "Within recent years a number of little lochs, or dubbs, existed between Kilwinning and Stevenston, the memory of which, at least, has been preserved in the name of Dubbs Farm." Ardeer House, Castlehill, Bartonholm, and Bogside were on the coast. The geology of the area shows river deposits along the course of the old river bed.

=== The Ardeer peninsula ===
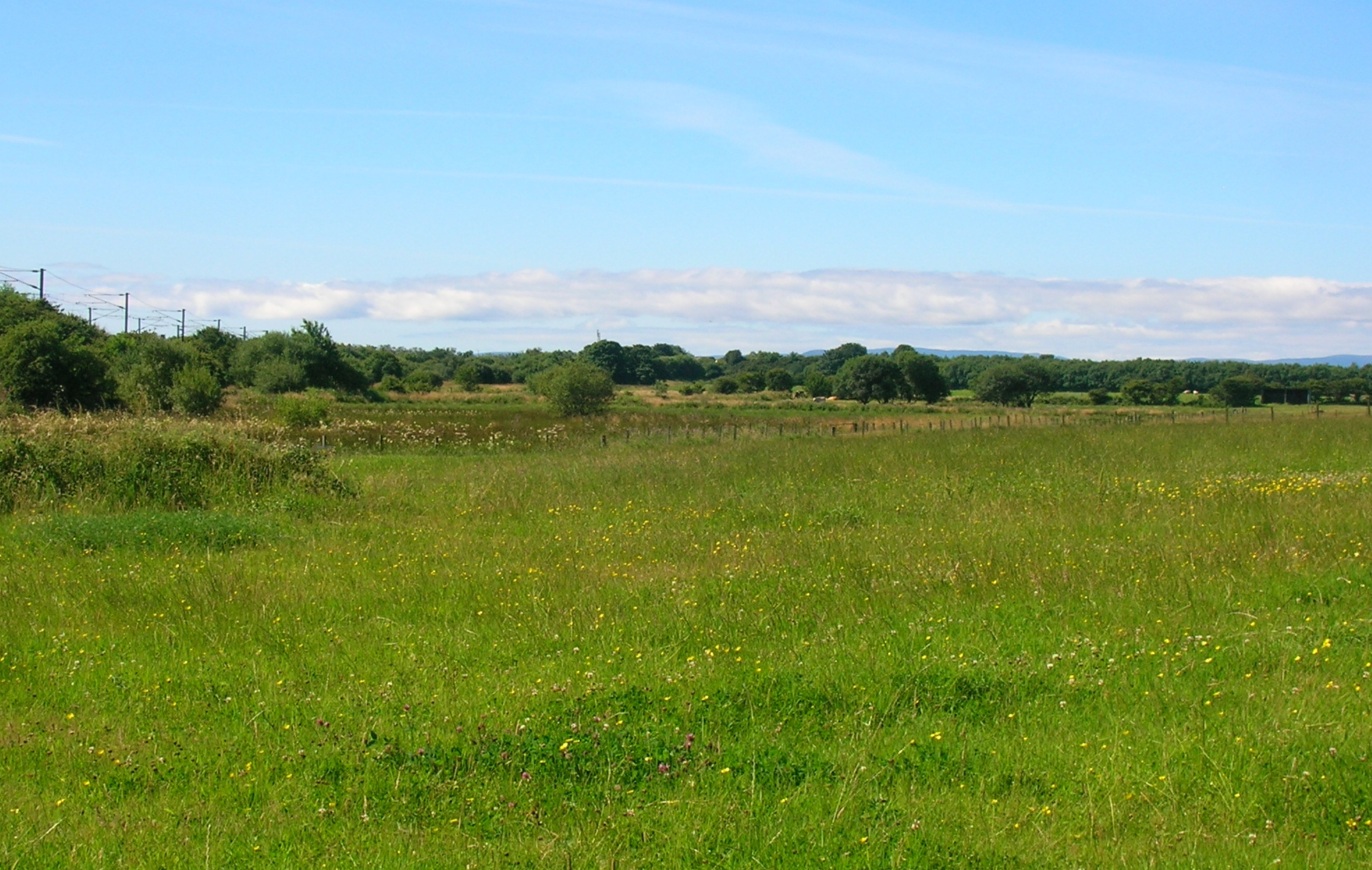
The old sea channel and coastline with Ardeer to the left

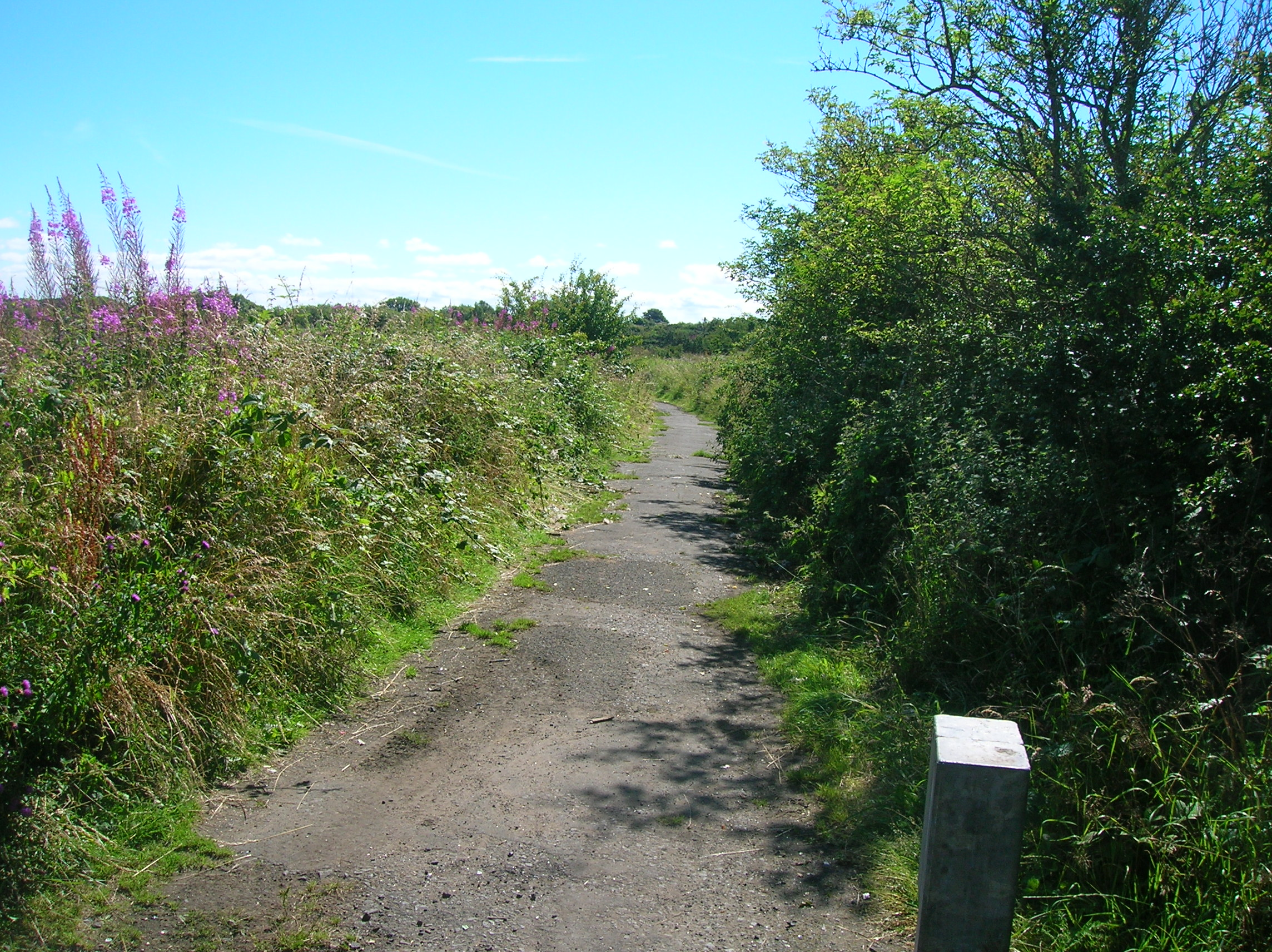
The old Inch Road that ran to Misk and Bog Farms

By the late 17th century the island had become a peninsula, for John Adair's map of 1685 does not show an island and the River Garnock follows its current course. Armstrong's map of 1747–55 also does not show an island and the area is marked as being only sand dunes, the first habitation being at Knowes and Bog. A road, the Knowes Road, followed the route of the old water course, running from Stevenston to Kilwinning.

Thomson's map of 1832 shows Inch Road running directly to Misk, a small group of buildings on the peninsula itself. 'Misk' in Scots means an area of wet low-lying land. The place name 'Inch Road' may recall Ardeer's history as a small island, also inch could refer to small islands in salt marshes, covered by spring-tides, but used as grazing for cattle.

The one time owner of the Ardeer estate, Patrick Warner, had picked up skills in land reclamation during his exile in Holland and in the late 17th century his first act was to drain the line of bogs or dubs by cutting the Master Gott or ditch, and this drainage system was later partly incorporated into the Stevenston Canal that ran up to Dubbs.

The Peninsula houses the remains of The Big Idea, a museum which operated from 2000 to 2003 celebrating Scottish Inventions and inventors. It has remained abandoned since its closure in summer 2003.

== History ==
=== Legends ===
A legend tells of Saint Winning sending his monks to fish in the River Garnock, however no matter how hard they tried or how long they persevered they could catch nothing. Saint Winning in response to the river's perversity placed a curse on the river, preventing it from ever having fish in its waters; the river responded by changing course and thereby avoiding the curse. It is clear that the river has substantially changed its course in recorded history, previously having entered the sea at Stevenston.

Robin Campbell tells a story of the murder of the Earl of Eglinton's wife on Ardeer by Nigellus, the Abbot of Kilwinning Abbey in the 16th century. Pilgrims came to Kilwinning Abbey partly because of the miracles that were performed there and the Earl of Eglinton, a follower of John Knox, strongly voiced his disbelief and also stated that he would stop paying tithes to the monks. In revenge the abbot arranged for the Countess of Eglinton to be waylaid on her customary journey to Ardrossan by way of Ardeer. The monks took her to a ruined bothy, below which was a stone lined cellar; she was imprisoned here and starved to death. The earl was never able to find her, although her drowned servant was discovered on the beach and tales of the screams of a woman's voice hidden in the crashing of the waves at Ardeer and of a distressed woman who vanished when approached began to spread. After the earl had died the last monk of Kilwinning Abbey is said to have confessed to his part in this awful crime and thereby revealed the truth behind the unexplained disappearance of the Countess of Eglinton.

=== Archaeology ===
Pre-history

A number of artifacts have been recovered from the Ardeer peninsula, including 54 flint arrowheads; 167 scrapers; 24 knives; a Late Bronze Age socketed gouge; part of a Bronze Age bead; a flat bead of dark blue glass; shale rings, armlets etc.; 2 Romano-British Brooches; a bronze pin and the head of a second; an early 10th-century, 'Whitby' type Anglo-Saxon bronze strap end; a probably 14th-century bronze ring brooch.

In 1906, drifting of sand revealed a small oval cairn about 15 by 10 ft (4.6 by 3.0 m) in size and 3 ft (0.9 m) high in the centre, composed of about eighty water-rolled boulders. This covered at least sixteen cinerary urns, mainly bucket-shaped. The site was destroyed by building works at the Nobel site.

A crannog site is located between Todhills Farm and the site of Bogend Farm. An area known as 'Snap Green', flooded at high spring tides, is shown near the tip of the peninsula in 1856. Extensive areas of saltings are shown to have existed at Misk in the 19th century.

The movement of the sands onto the island of Ardeer must have been relatively rapid as records show that quarrying and mining at Misk Colliery exposed rich alluvial soil at Ardeer with clear signs of ploughing and artifacts such as earthenware and even a tobacco pipe that dates the ploughing to no earlier than the mid-16th century when tobacco was first introduced.

The Castle Hill

Timothy Pont refers to the sand dunes as Knoppes and he states that at one time a substantial castle was located here upon a large dune or mole of earth, still known in his time as Castle Hill. It is debated whether or not he was actually referring to the well known Castle Hill that lies inland.

Robin Campbell tells a tale of the House of Ardeer that was situated on the Ardeer sands and was built by the 'Picts', carrying the stones across from the 'mainland.' The buildings are said to have been destroyed by a huge storm, brought down upon the sands by the wife of the farmer at Misk when he was drowned in the nearby bog. By the 18th century only the remains of a dovecot and a few windblown trees are said to have survived.

=== Ardeer House ===
This property, previously Dovecothall, was located at Stevenston, close to the site of the old Piperheugh hamlet. One of the most distinguished owners was the covenanter Patrick Warner, a minister who was forced to escape to Holland after the Battle of Bothwell Bridge. It once stood on the coast and is said to have been a favourite anchorage ground, anchors having been found at various points inland. A sea-washed cave is located a little behind the house.

=== The Stevenston Ironworks ===
In 1849 the Glengarnock Iron Company built five blast furnaces on the foreshore of the Ardeer sands to smelt pig-iron. The iron ore was imported through Ardrossan harbour and to reduce costs Merry and Cunningham Ltd., successors to the Glengarnock company, started to build a quay by dumping slag into the sea. After 300 yards of these works had been completed it became obvious that no ship could safely dock here given the force of winter storms. The quay was abandoned and to this day it is known as the 'old pier' or 'slag point'. The works closed in 1931 and were demolished in 1935.

=== Coal Pits ===
The West Field coal pits largely lay within the present-day Ardeer Park. In circa 1800 the pits were named Raise, Dip, First East, Crank, Stair, Second East, Old Engine, Bowbridge, and Bridge Shank. These were served by the Stevenston Canal, many with their own dedicated branches.

=== Nobel Explosives plant ===
The Ardeer peninsula was the site of a massive dynamite manufacturing plant built by Alfred Bernhard Nobel. Having scoured the country for a remote location to establish his explosive factory, Nobel finally acquired 100 acres (40 hectares) from the Earl of Eglinton, and established the British Dynamite Factory in 1871, and went on to create what was described then as the largest explosives factory in the world. The factory had its own jetty on the River Garnock in Irvine Harbour serving ships disposing of time expired explosives or importing materials for the works.

At its peak, the site employed almost 13,000 workers in a fairly remote location and had its own railway station. The station was used solely for workers and those special visitors with business in the ICI plant, and was never a regular passenger stop. Until the mid-1960s, there were two trains per day to transport workers. Although the line no longer exists, the abandoned platform remains, hidden beneath dense undergrowth.

Its first manager was George McRoberts FRSE and other notable staff included Edwin Mervyn Patterson who was manager from 1954 to 1982.

== Transport ==
=== Canals ===
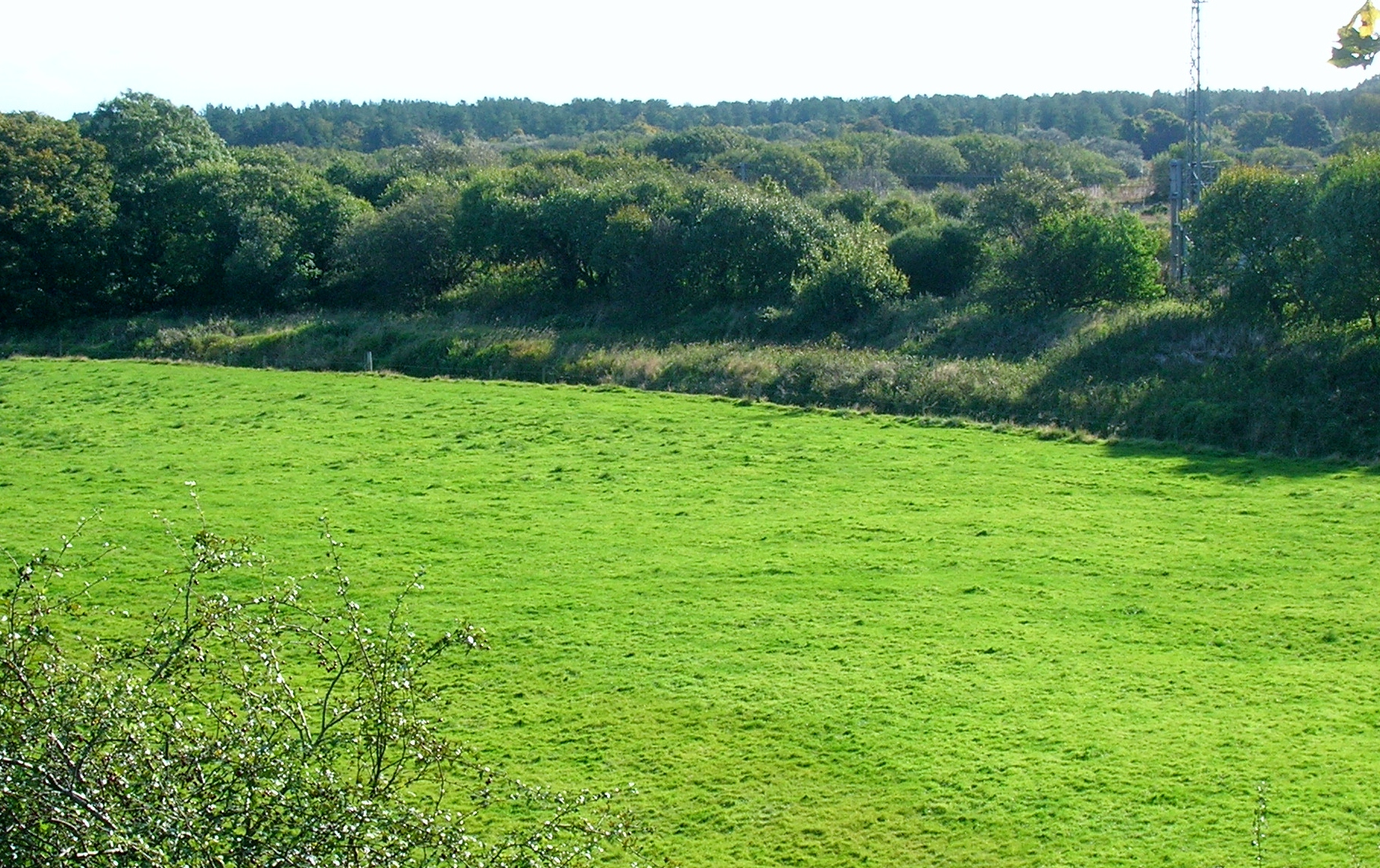
The Master Gott (drain) from the Ardeer Roadbridge

The Stevenston Canal of 1772 was the first commercial canal in Scotland. The canal was just over two miles (three kilometres) long, had no locks, was 12 ft (3.7 m) wide and had a depth of 4 ft (1.2 m), with much of its cut following the old course of the River Garnock, a relic of the days when Ardeer was an island. The Master Gott or drain is thought to be the last remaining vestige. Coal was carried on barges and the waste was dumped along the route to act as a wind break, blown sand being a recurring problem. The water supply came from a dam on the Stevenston Burn. The Ardeer Quarry that produced Stevenston Stone exported to Ireland from Saltcoats Harbour almost certainly used the canal for transporting its stone output.

A 1798 plan of the Stevenston Colliery shows a Misk Canal of around 1 mile (1.5 kilometres) long running west and then north into the Misk Coalfield from the River Garnock.

=== Railways ===
In 1840 a station opened at Ardeer, named Stevenston, on the line travelling from Ardrossan to Glasgow. A railway station, Ardeer Platform, was also built, just south of the town, serving the large numbers of Nobel factory workers; it closed in 1966. By 1836 a horse-drawn wagonway had been built from Saltcoats down to the Bowbridge Pit and others in the area that is now the Ardeer Park.

== Sport ==
=== Ardeer Golf Club ===
The ICI land used to be home to Ardeer golf club. The original course was 9 holes in the Sandyhills area of Stevenston. Although the course has since long gone the original red sandstone clubhouse remains.

The club then relocated to the Ardeer area of Stevenston, with the new course opening on 8 April 1905. This course was a true seaside links laid out in the stretch of dunes between the town and the sea on land owned by the Imperial Chemical Industries Ltd (ICI). ICI was where the club drew most of its membership, including Hamilton McInally, the Scottish Amateur champion of 1937, 1939 & 1947. Jackie Cannon was a member prior to winning the Scottish amateur championship in 1969 at the age of 52, the oldest winner ever.

During the Second World War three of the holes were taken over by ICI for war duty and became a barrage balloon station. The three holes were restored after the war ensuring that the course was as good a test as it ever was.

This was not to be the resting place of the Ardeer course because in the early sixties the membership were dealt a major blow when officials of the club were called to the headquarters of the Nobel Division of ICI. The clubhouse and the land which contained the golf course were required for the construction of a new factory for the manufacture of salts for use in the nylon industry. The club had no option on the matter as ICI owned the land.

After several general meetings, it was decided that Lochend was where Ardeer Golf Course was to be reborn. Continual improvements have been ongoing in the last 38 years to take the course to what it is today by the strenuous efforts of both the members and green staff. Drainage has been improved over the years ensuring all year-round golf. There is a combination of mature and young trees of all varieties lining the fairways and full use has been made of the two burns which meander through the course. Ongoing improvements to teeing areas, greens and course in general means that the history is still in the making.

=== Other sports ===
The 1895 25 inch OS map shows a rifle range on the peninsula with targets set at 100-yard intervals and a magazine. In 1908 a cricket ground and pavilion are shown in the old golf course area.

== Education ==
=== Schools ===
Ardeer Primary School was opened in August 1982. The school is located in the Ardeer Area of Stevenston in Clark Crescent and serves ages 5 to 11 in a primary school and a nursery class. The Old Ardeer Primary School sat on Garven Road, before closing in late 1981.

== Culture ==
=== Parish church ===
In the heart of Ardeer is the Shore Road Ardeer Parish which was officially opened on Friday, 14 June 1895, the dedicatory service being conducted by the Rev. Alexander Robertson McEwan. Rev Andrew Morris Moodie's first sermon in the new church was to the children, significantly enough, on the afternoon of Sunday, 16 June 1895. It is early 20th-century red sandstone Gothic building in the perpendicular style, designed by John Bennie Wilson. Perpendicular Gothic, it has an octagonal two-stage tower, with corbelled shafts at the angles to the upper stage flanking bipartite belfrey louvred lights; the parapet has battlements and truncated pinnacles are located at the angles.

Ardeer church currently has 2 ministers; Rev John Lafferty and Rev David Hebenton who are shared between Ardeer and their linked church, Livingstone Parish Church, just a short distance away.

=== Nudist beach ===
Ardeer is also home to the only official naturist beach (located at 55°36′52″N 4°42′54″W) on the south-west Scottish mainland.

== Wildlife on Ardeer peninsula ==
Before industrialisation began in the late 19th century, the peninsula consisted mainly of one very large mobile dune system bordered by a sandy beach on the west and salt marsh and mud flats beside the River Garnock on the east. An early reference to "Ardeer Hills" in 1775 suggests the large size of many of the dunes. Although the development of Nobel's (and later ICI) explosives factory led to the stabilisation and re-contouring of extensive areas, the demands of the business (requiring distancing of units for safety reasons) allowed the general nature of the area to be retained.

In recent decades, sand extraction has resulted in the loss of 20 ha of dunes but the southern half of the peninsula still retains much of its original character. When the peninsula was surveyed for North Ayrshire Council in 2015 it was found to be the best biodiversity site in North Ayrshire. Part of the peninsula is a Site of Special Scientific Interest (Bogside Flats). The peninsula also occupies an important position within an area that includes two nature reserves (Garnock Floods managed by the Scottish Wildlife Trust and the Bogside Reserve managed by the RSPB).

=== Habitats ===
The seaward side of the peninsula is constrained by a concrete sea wall which was built from 1926 to 1929. This has greatly reduced the mobility of the dunes but is breaking up in places, which could allow more mobility again. The sand dunes make up the bulk of the peninsula and remain semi-natural throughout most of the southern half. Most of this peninsula area is dominated by acid dune grassland with extensive areas of dune heath and Dune slack. On the east side of the peninsula lie the salt marsh and mudflats of the River Garnock estuary which form part of the Bogside Flats SSSI. Parts of the northern half of the peninsula were planted with conifers, mainly Corsican pine (Pinus nigra) in the middle of the 20th century. These plantations have been left largely untouched. The resulting over-mature pine forest is a rare habitat in southern Scotland and is particularly noteworthy in terms of its large quantities of dead wood. There has also been a significant amount of natural woodland regeneration in various places, consisting of birches (Betula spp.), willows (Salix spp.), alder (Alnus glutinosa) and sycamore (Acer pseudoplatanus).

=== Biodiversity ===
About 1500 species have been recorded at Ardeer of which two thirds are invertebrates, making it one of the most important sites for insects in Scotland. Of these the bees and wasps (Hymenoptera) and beetles (Coleoptera) are particularly noteworthy.

Ardeer is thought to be the best site in Scotland for solitary bees and wasps, owing to the sandy substrate and profusion of wildflowers. Among the notable species are the northern colletes (Colletes floralis) which has a mainly Hebridean distribution in Scotland and several species, such as the hairy-saddled colletes (Colletes fodiens) and pale-jawed spiny digger wasp (Oxybelus mandibularis) which are mainly southern in Britain and are found in few other sites in Scotland.

Surveys of beetles at Ardeer have identified 341 species of which 22 are nationally rare or scarce (Red Data Book, nationally rare/scarce or nationally notable). Among these are the ground beetles Harpalus neglectus which was a first record for Scotland and Stenolophus mixtus which is a second Scottish record, plus the clown beetle Hypocaccus rugiceps for which Ardeer is the most northern recent record for Britain. Ardeer is also home to the impressive Minotaur beetle, Typhaeus typhoeus, which has its Scottish stronghold in the dunes of Ardeer and Irvine.

Ardeer holds Ayrshire's largest populations of dark green fritillary and grayling butterflies and a number of nationally scarce moths, including sand dune rarities such as coast dart and shore wainscot. Over 100 species of spider have been recorded at Ardeer with wolf spiders (Lycosidae) being particularly prominent, with half of the species on the Scottish list present. Among these the nationally scarce dune specialist Xerolycosa miniata is particularly noteworthy, being mainly a southern species.

Among the 122 species of birds recorded the lesser whitethroat is particularly noteworthy, as it is right at the north-west extremity of its European distribution and Ardeer and the neighbouring East Garnock area holds the largest breeding population in Ayrshire. Other notable species recorded at the site include hen harrier, long-eared owl, osprey and snow bunting. During migration and winter the Garnock mudflats and estuary hold regionally important numbers of wigeon, greenshank and other wildfowl and waders.

=== Threats to wildlife ===
In the past the safety precautions associated with the explosives industry protected the habitats on the peninsula. However the area is now under threat from two sources. Firstly, a Special Development Order for the Ardeer area was granted by the UK government in 1953. This still allows developments to take place without the normal planning scrutiny which would be required elsewhere in Scotland. Secondly, government money has been granted under the Ayrshire Growth Deal which could lead to commercial, housing and recreational developments around the Irvine/Garnock estuaries. This could result in very significant loss of habitats and hence many of the highly specialised species in them.
