= Nobel Fire Systems =

Fire suppression equipment company

Nobel Fire Systems is a business based in Heywood, Greater Manchester in the North West of England specializing in the design, supply, installation and maintenance of fire suppression and fire protection systems. It was formerly part of Nobel Enterprises, a division of the chemicals group Imperial Chemical Industries (ICI) but is now independently owned.

== History ==
Nobel Fire Systems was founded in 2003 following a buy out of Nobel Enterprises from ICI by The Reformer Group and Inabata, a Japanese chemical company. As the name suggests the company is one of the many that has its derivations from the explosives site founded in 1870 by the chemist and industrialist Alfred Nobel for the production of dynamite. The site is based in Ardeer, on the west coast of Scotland in Ayrshire, which at its peak employed nearly 13,000 workers.

The production of Nobel Fire Systems core gas generator technology is still manufactured at the site in Ardeer. The business has now diversified and as such offers products that cover all classes of fires, including watermist, gas, wet chemical, dry chemical powder and aerosol based products and specialises in 5 market sectors; catering, marine, industrial, data protection and property. The business employs 23 people and exports its products across the world.

The business works for many of the world's leading companies including the Spirit Group, Hilton, KFC and Holiday Inn, as well as having products that have been installed at such prestigious locations as Buckingham Palace, the Houses of Parliament and Edinburgh Castle.
