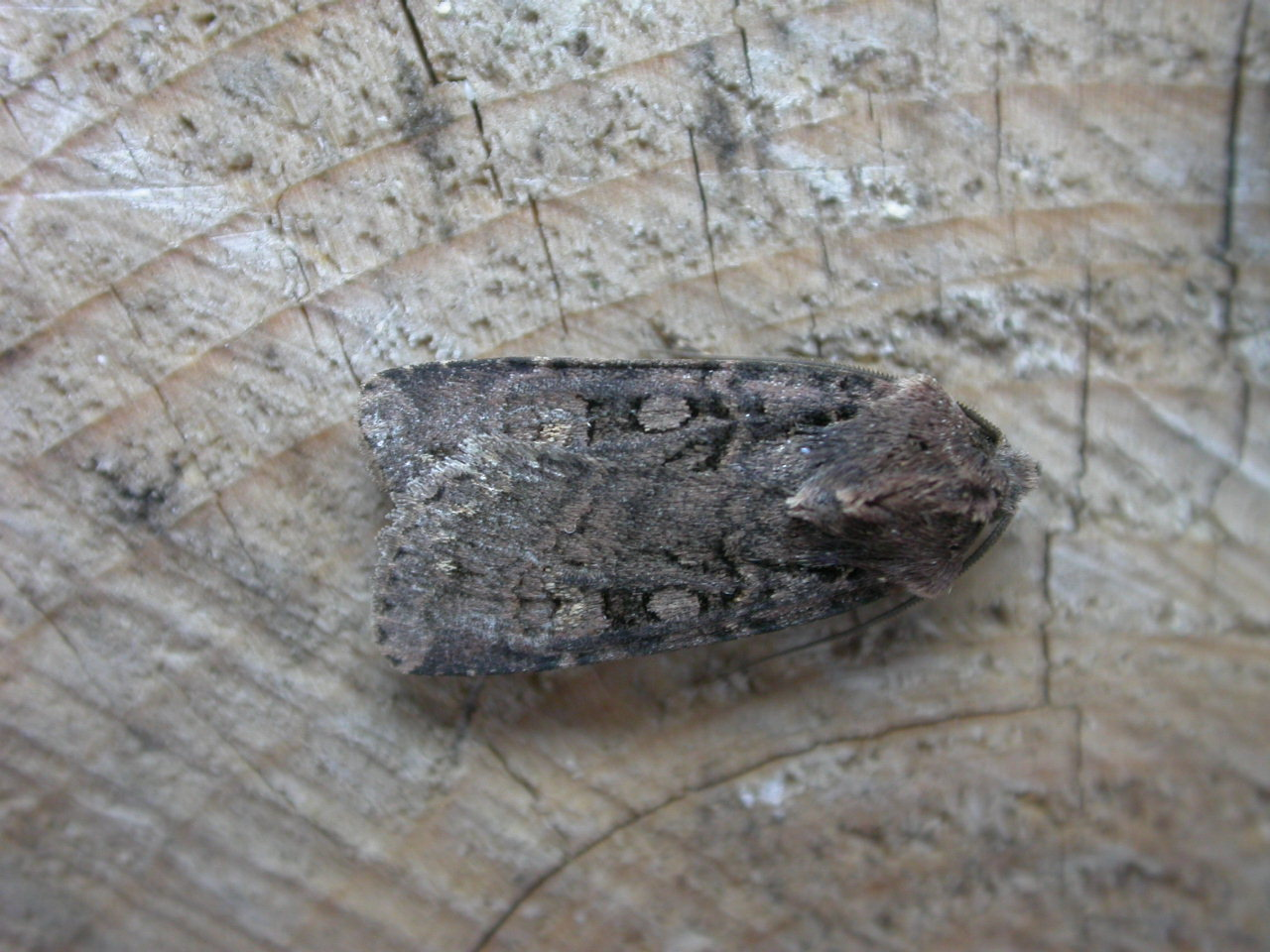

Scientific classification
- Kingdom: Animalia
- Phylum: Arthropoda
- Class: Insecta
- Order: Lepidoptera
- Superfamily: Noctuoidea
- Family: Noctuidae
- Genus: Euxoa
- Species: E. nigricans

Binomial name
- Euxoa nigricans (Linnaeus, 1761)

= Garden dart =

Species of moth

The garden dart (Euxoa nigricans) is a moth of the family Noctuidae. It is distributed throughout much of the Palearctic. Temperate regions of Europe, Central Asia and North Asia, as well as the mountains of North Africa. Absent from polar regions, on Iceland and some Mediterranean islands (Balearic Islands, Malta, Greek Islands, Crete, Cyprus), as well as in Macaronesia (Azores, Madeira, Canary Islands).

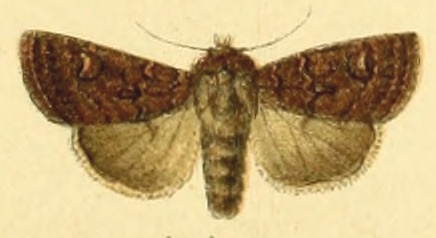
Illustration

This is a rather drab species, forewings ranging from pale to dark brown with indistinct markings. The hindwings are white with a grey fringe. The wingspan is 32–40 mm. This moth flies at night in July and August and is attracted to light and many different flowers.

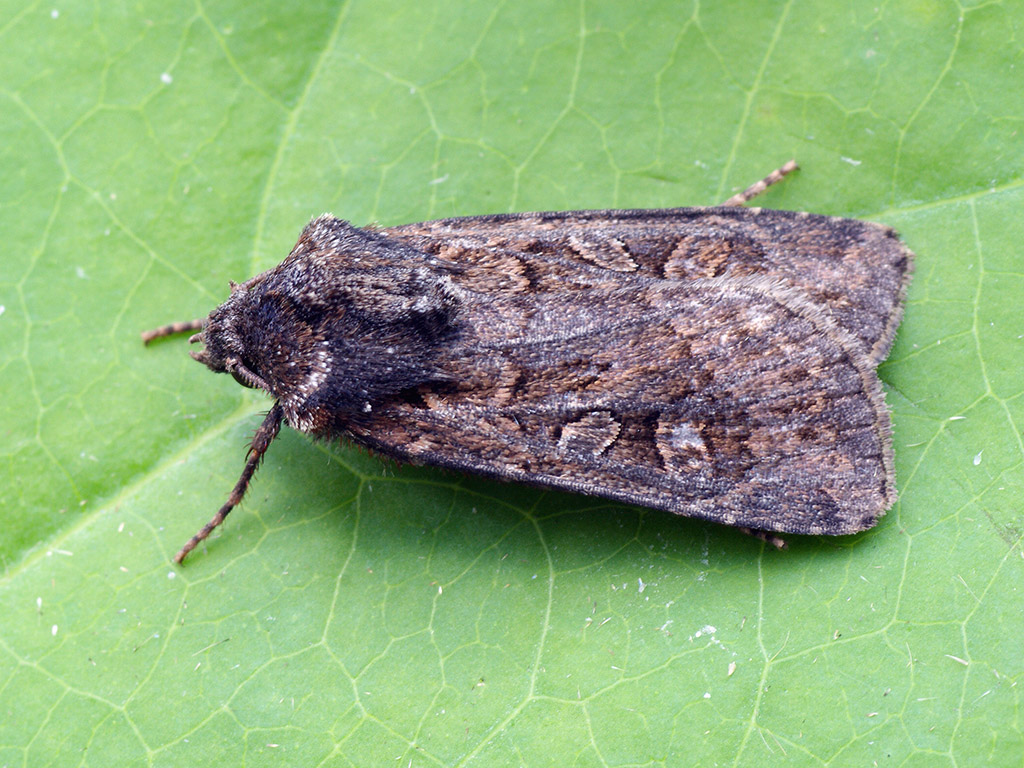
Euxoa nigricans Moscow oblast

== Technical description and variation ==
Forewing black brown with all markings obscured, or dark red-brown with the markings plainer; the edges of stigmata finely black; some ochreous scales on outside of reniform, along the course of submarginal line and at base below cell; hindwing brownish fuscous, the basal half paler in male. More than 20 aberrations are noted by Tutt, grouped, as usual, according to colouration; — the first two, with ground colour grey, are rare: -ab. pallida Tutt with a reddish tinge, and the lines and stigmata all but obsolete; — and ab. flavopallida Tutt, similar, but with the lines and stigmata yellow; -- the following 5 are pale reddish; — ab. rufa Tutt, with lines and stigmata pale: — ab. ruris Haw. with the markings yellow; — ab. obeliscata Haw. with cell black on each side of the orbicular stigma; — ab. striata Tutt with the base, stigmata, lines, and outer nervules yellow ochreous: — and ab. rufovariegata Tutt mottled red and yellow, the stigmata edged with black: — the next 5 are dark reddish brown; — ab. rubricans Esp. with the lines paler; — ab. rufovilis with stigmata and lines yellow; — ab. quadrata Tutt, like the last, but with a square black blotch between the stigmata, as in ab. obeliscata Haw.; — ab. ochrea Tutt, with faint lines but the stigmata and veins ochreous: — ab. fuscovariegata Tutt, purplish-brown mottled with ochreous and with the dark blotch between the stigmata: - in the next 4 the ground colour is blackish-brown or blackish fuscous, as in typical nigricans L.; — ab. dubia Haw. with lines and stigmata deeper, and with a conspicuous waved submarginal line: — ab. fumida smoky brown with ochreous reniform and yellowish submarginal line; — ab. marshallana sooty brown with dark lines and ochreous stigmata: — ab. ursina God. with lines and stigmata dark, a submarginal row of wedge-shaped spots and the outer edge of reniform stigma whitish; — ab. rustica Er. much smaller than the last, with the markings obsolete; — the last group has the ground colour black; — ab. carbonea Hbn. with lines and stigmata yellowish; — ab. fumata with the upper stigmata pale-edged; — ab fumosa F. with a submarginal row of whitish wedge-shaped spots; — and ab. fuliginea God. wholly black, with the very faintest of markings. Euxoa nigricans is difficult to certainly distinguish from its congeners . See Townsend et al.

== Similar species ==
- Euxoa obelisca ([Denis & Schiffermüller], 1775)
- Euxoa tritici (Linnaeus, 1761)
- Euxoa cursoria (Hufnagel, 1766)

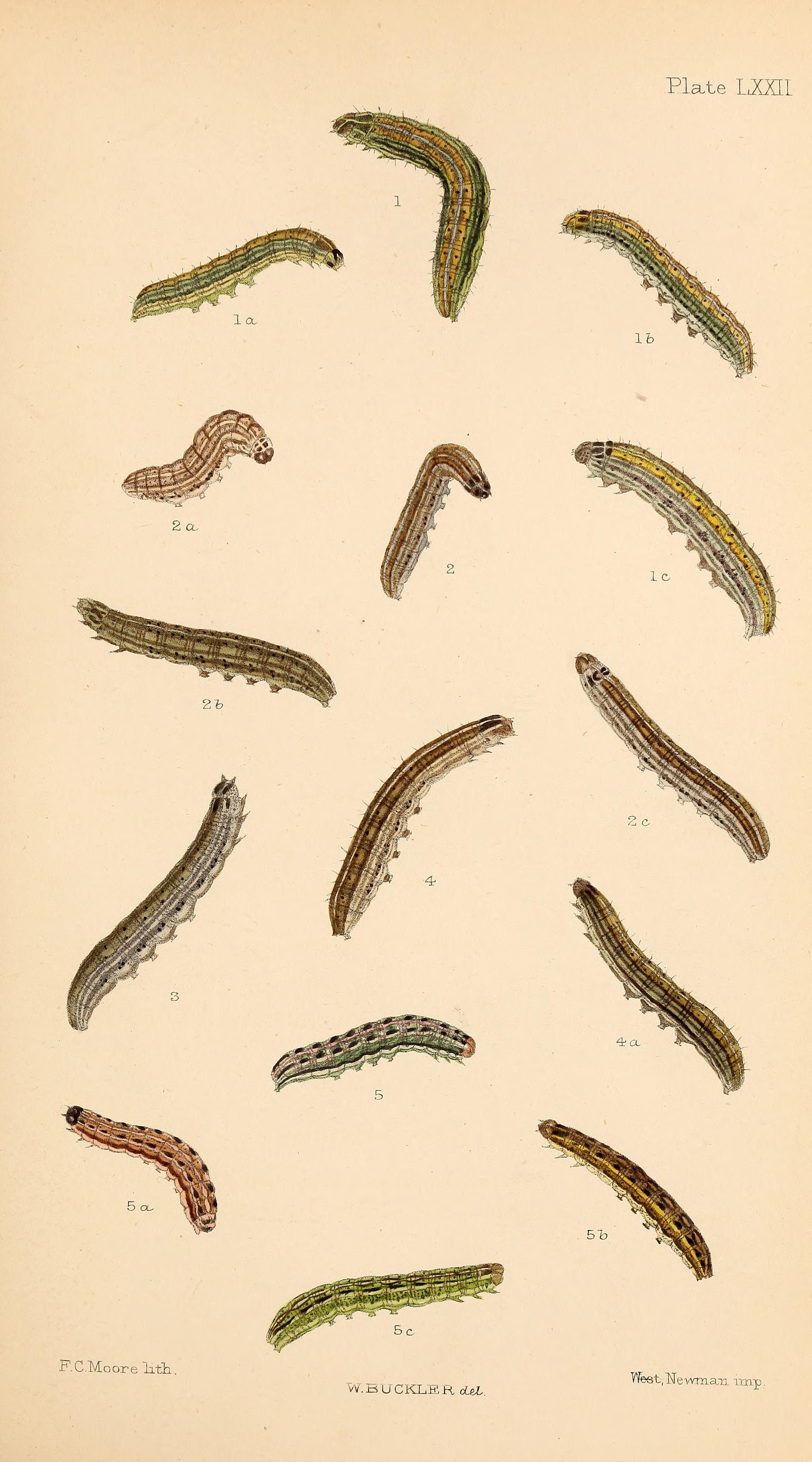
Figs 1, 1a, 1b, 1c larva after last moult

== Biology ==
Larva ochreous grey, paler, more greenish, at sides; lines greenish edged with black: the subspiracular line whitish and double; head with black speckling. The larva is green or brown with two white stripes down each side. It feeds on a range of plants (see list below). The species overwinters as an egg.

1. The flight season refers to the British Isles. This may vary in other parts of the range.

== Recorded food plants ==
- Allium
- Beta - beet
- Brassica
- Daucus - carrot
- Gossypium - cotton plant
- Lactuca - lettuce
- Pastinaca - parsnip
- Phaseolus
- Poaceae - grasses
- Polygonum - knotgrass
- Solanum - potato
- Trifolium - clover
- Vitis - grape
- Taraxacum - dandelion

See Robinson, G. S. et al.
