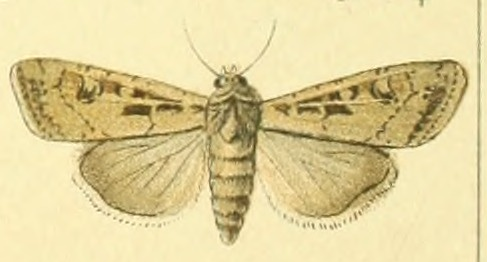
- female
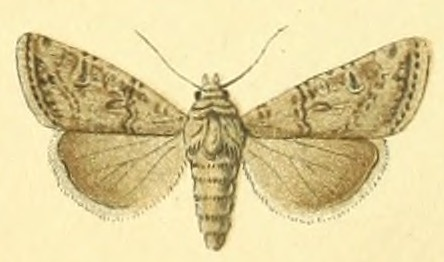
- male

Scientific classification
- Kingdom: Animalia
- Phylum: Arthropoda
- Clade: Pancrustacea
- Class: Insecta
- Order: Lepidoptera
- Superfamily: Noctuoidea
- Family: Noctuidae
- Genus: Euxoa
- Species: E. cursoria

Binomial name
- Euxoa cursoria Hufnagel, 1766

Synonyms
- Phalaena cursoria; Euxoa wirima

= Euxoa cursoria =

Coast dart

Species of moth

Euxoa cursoria, the coast dart, is a moth of the family Noctuidae. It is found in northern and central Europe as well as the coastal regions of the British Isles, central Siberia, Mongolia, Tibet and Afghanistan. The subspecies Euxoa cursoria wirima is found in Canada.

== Technical description and variation ==
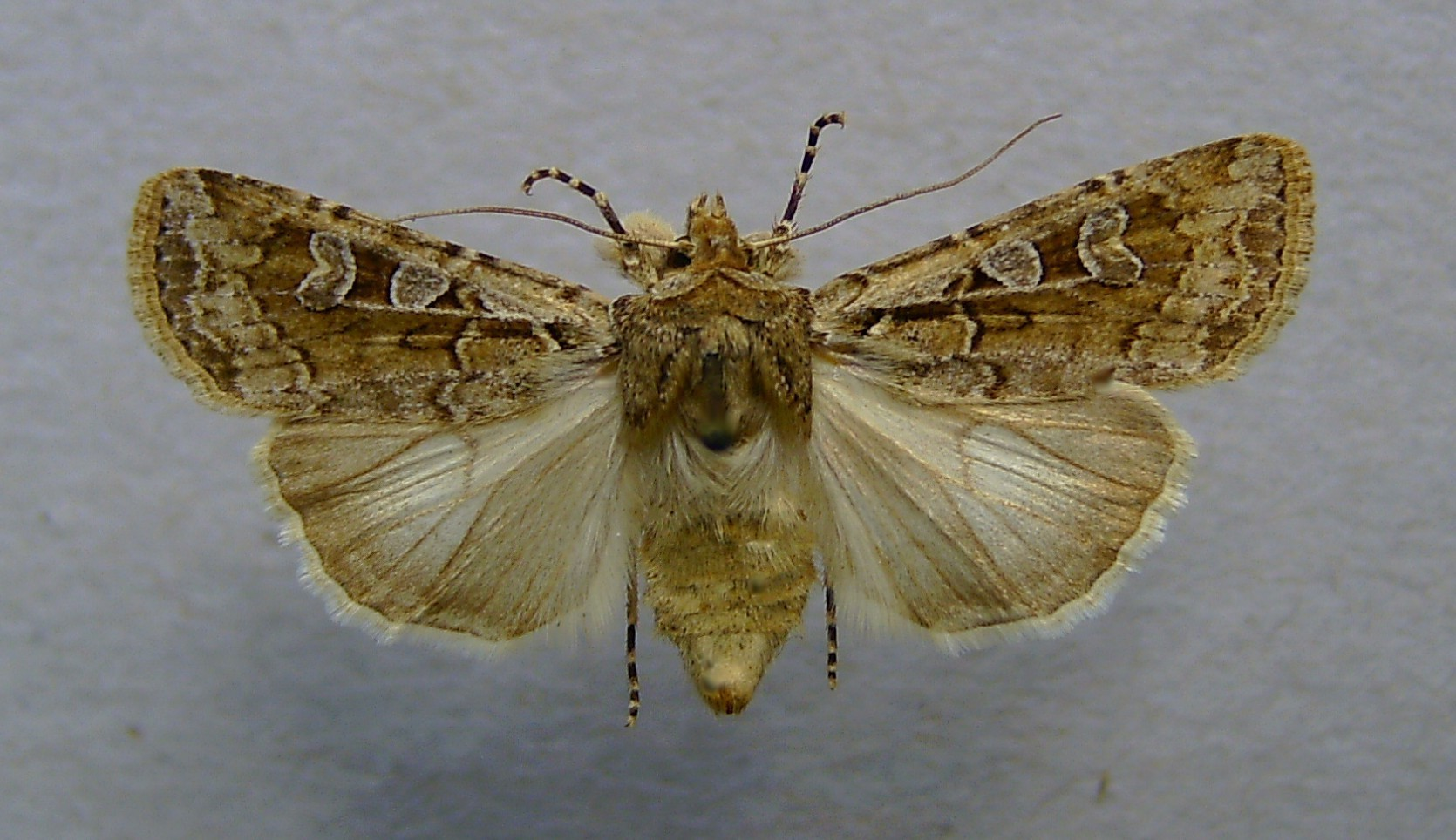
Euxoa cursoria set specimen

Forewing sandy ochreous, often much suffused and speckled with brownish grey; claviform stigma absent, or with dark outline only; orbicular and reniform with dark centres and pale rings, the lower lobe of reniform always deeper; sometimes the cell, the claviform, and a basal streak before it are dark olive brown; hindwing dull greyish ochreous with fuscous termen and pale cilia; a variable insect ab. obscura Stgr. has the forewings almost wholly red-brown, the stigmata with white rings, and occurs on the shores of the Baltic; -ab. currens Stgr. has both wings dark; — while ab.vaga Stgr. is uniform brownish grey; - lastly, ab. sagittata Stgr. is a more variegated form, with red-brown suffusion and little dusting, and the costal streak, the upper stigmata, and the postmedian area whitish; the three last are Central Asian; specimens from Asia Minor have the hindwings wholly white. Euxoa cursoria is difficult to certainly distinguish from its congeners. See Townsend et al.

- Euxoa obelisca ([Denis & Schiffermüller], 1775)
- Euxoa tritici (Linnaeus, 1761)
- Euxoa nigricans (Linnaeus, 1761)

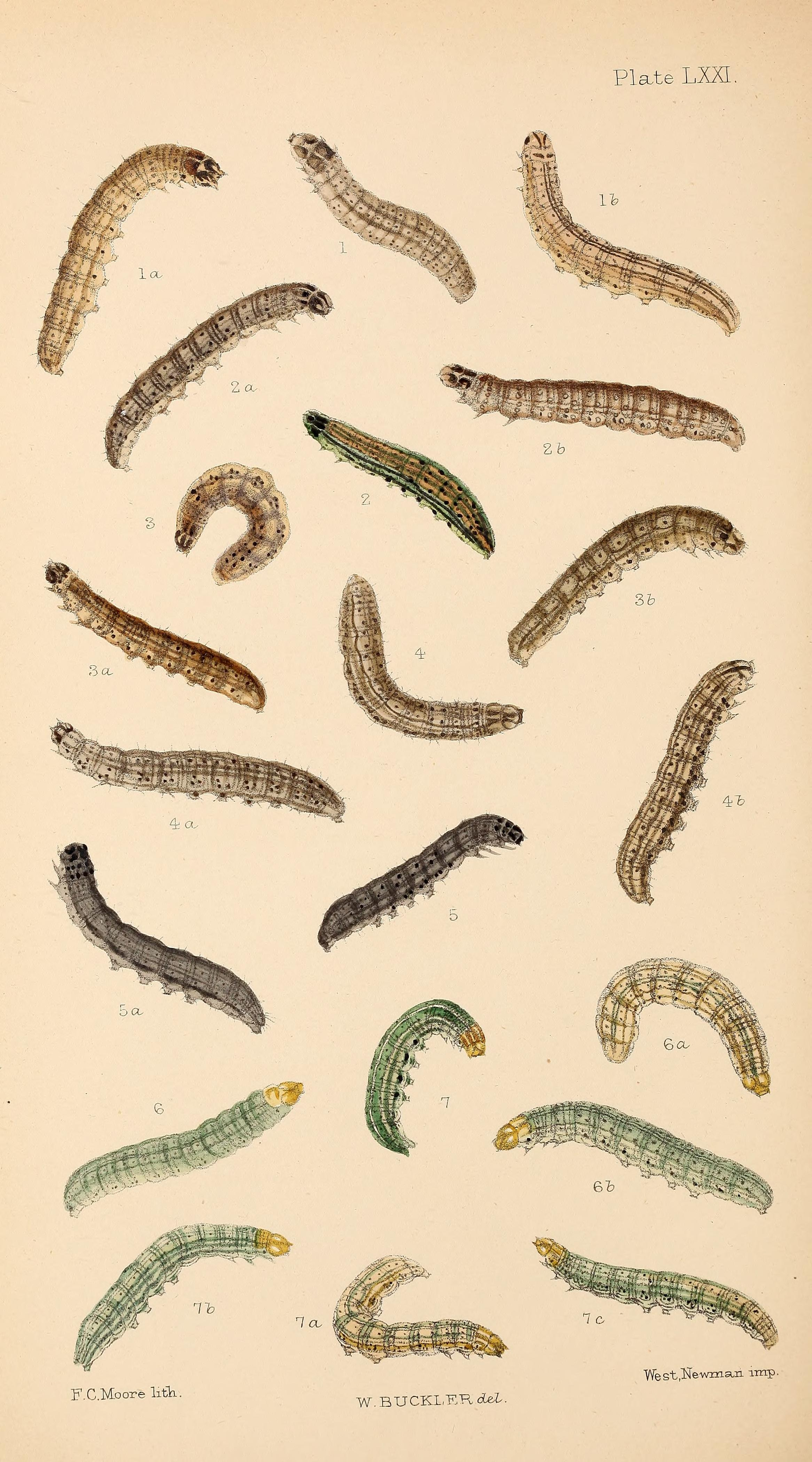
Figs 7, 7a, 7b, 7c larva after last moult

== Biology ==
This moth flies from July to September depending on the location.

Larva pale ochreous tinged with greenish; the lines paler, edgedwith grey-green; the head pale ochreous. The larvae feed on various sandhill plants, including Honckenya peploides and Elytrigia juncea, as well as Elymus arenarius, Rumex, Atriplex littoralis, Minuartia pebloides, Cakile maritima, Lathyrus maritimus and Asparagus. .

== Subspecies ==
- Euxoa cursoria cursoria
- Euxoa cursoria wirima Hardwick, 1965 (Canada)
