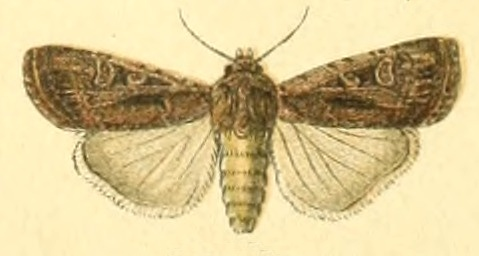

Scientific classification
- Kingdom: Animalia
- Phylum: Arthropoda
- Class: Insecta
- Order: Lepidoptera
- Superfamily: Noctuoidea
- Family: Noctuidae
- Genus: Euxoa
- Species: E. aquilina

Binomial name
- Euxoa aquilina (Denis & Schiffermüller, 1775)

Synonyms
- Noctua aquilina Denis & Schiffermüller, 1775; Noctua fictilis Hübner, [1813]; Noctua unicolor Hübner, [1813]; Agrotis tritici var. distincta Staudinger, 1892; Euxoa schwingenschussi Corti, 1926; Euxoa actinea Kozhanchikov, 1929; Euxoa quassa Corti, 1931; Euxoa corporea Corti, 1931; Euxoa aquilina var. rabiosa Corti, 1931; Euxoa terrestris Corti, 1931; Euxoa punctifera Corti, 1931; Euxoa rangnowi Corti, 1932; Euxoa aquilina var. schawerdae Boursin, 1934; Euxoa aquilina f. pseudoobscurior Heydemann, 1938; Agrotis uniformis Rougemont, 1902; Euxoa petrina Mayer, 1937; Euxoa tritic var. falleri Schawerda, 1927; Euxoa vinosa Schawerda

= Euxoa aquilina =

Species of moth

Euxoa aquilina is a moth of the family Noctuidae. It is found in the Mediterranean region of Europe, North Africa, the Near East and the Middle East.

== Description ==
Larger than Euxoa tritici and dull brown, with luteous instead of white scaling, the costa generally paler.

== Subspecies ==
- Euxoa aquilina aquilina
- Euxoa aquilina falleri (Corsica, Sardinia)

== Biology ==
Adults are on wing from May to October. There is one generation per year.

The larvae feed subterraneous on roots of Poaceae species and other herbivorous plants. Dry meadows.
