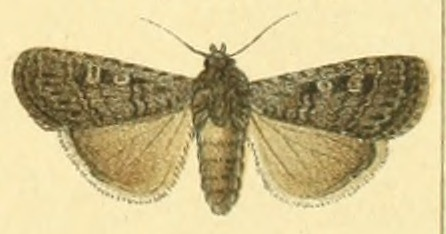

Scientific classification
- Kingdom: Animalia
- Phylum: Arthropoda
- Clade: Pancrustacea
- Class: Insecta
- Order: Lepidoptera
- Superfamily: Noctuoidea
- Family: Noctuidae
- Genus: Euxoa
- Species: E. eruta

Binomial name
- Euxoa eruta (Hübner, [1817])

Synonyms
- Noctua eruta Hübner, [1817]

= Euxoa eruta =

Species of moth

Euxoa eruta is a moth of the family Noctuidae. It is found in Italy, Spain, France, Germany, Denmark, Fennoscandia, Austria, Switzerland, Hungary, Bulgaria, the Czech Republic, Greece, Turkey, Belarus, the Baltic region, Siberia and from central Asia up to the Altai Mountains. Note that E. eruta may not be a good species. The Euxoa tritici complex consists of five sibling species in Europe: Euxoa tritici (Linnaeus, 1761), Euxoa nigrofusca (Esper, 1788), Euxoa eruta (Hübner, 1817), Euxoa diaphora Boursin, 1928 and Euxoa segnilis (Duponchel, 1836). Furthermore, although Fibiger (1997) treated Euxoa montivaga differently it belongs to the E. tritici complex. Differences among the species are subtle, the most important diagnostic characteristics being genitalic. In studies of three of these species, E. tritici, E. nigrofusca and E. eruta, no support was found for the presence of several morphologically distinguishable species with quantitative morphometric analyses.

The wingspan is 29–38 mm. Adults are on wing from June to September.
