= Harpalus neglectus =

Scientific classification
- Kingdom: Animalia
- Phylum: Arthropoda
- Class: Insecta
- Order: Coleoptera
- Suborder: Adephaga
- Family: Carabidae
- Genus: Harpalus
- Species: H. neglectus

Binomial name
- Harpalus neglectus Audinet-Serville, 1821

Species of beetle

Harpalus neglectus is a species of ground beetle native to Europe, where it can be found in such territories as Belgium, Bulgaria, Croatia, Czech Republic, France, Germany, Great Britain including the Isle of Man, Ireland, Italy, Moldova, Poland, Portugal, Sardinia, Spain, Sweden, the Netherlands and Ukraine. It is doubtful that the beetle exists in Austria, Slovakia and Switzerland. It is also found in such African countries as Algeria, Morocco, and Tunisia.
