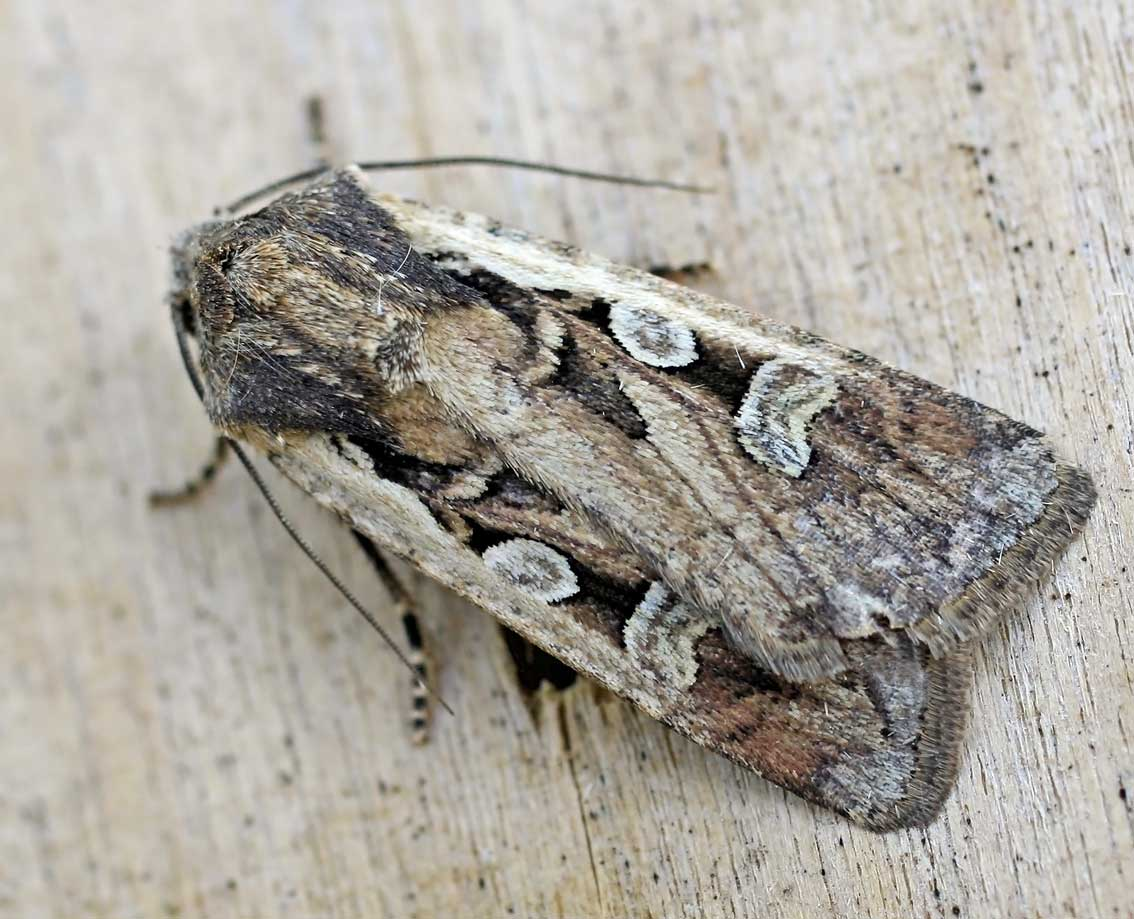

Scientific classification
- Kingdom: Animalia
- Phylum: Arthropoda
- Clade: Pancrustacea
- Class: Insecta
- Order: Lepidoptera
- Superfamily: Noctuoidea
- Family: Noctuidae
- Genus: Euxoa
- Species: E. temera

Binomial name
- Euxoa temera Hübner, 1808

Synonyms
- Noctua temera; Noctua ruris; Noctua fictilis; Euxoa fictilis; Agrotis villiersii; Euxoa villiersi; Agrotis declarans; Euxoa alphonsina

= Euxoa temera =

Species of moth

Euxoa temera is a moth of the family Noctuidae. It is found in Central and Southern Europe, North Africa, the Caucasus, Armenia, Turkey, Iraq, Iran and Central Asia.

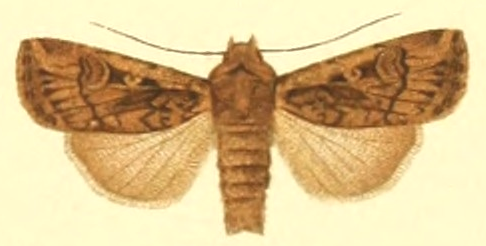
Illustration

The wingspan is 30–35 mm. The moth flies from October to November depending on the location.

The larvae feed on Poaceae species and other low plants.
