= Nobel Enterprises =

UK business

Nobel Enterprises (/noʊˈbɛl/) is a chemicals business that used to be based at Ardeer, in the Ayrshire town of Stevenston, in Scotland. Specialising in nitrogen-based propellants and explosives and nitrocellulose-based products such as varnishes and inks. It was formerly ICI Nobel, a division of the chemicals group ICI, but was then sold to Inabata, a Japanese trading firm. The business was sold on to Chemring Group in 2005 and is now a Scottish Company (Chemring Energetics UK Ltd), part of Chemring Group. Stefan Donald is currently the lead engineer for the ongoing regeneration project.

== History ==
Nobel Industries Limited was founded in 1870 by Swedish chemist and industrialist Alfred Nobel for the production of the new explosive dynamite in the United Kingdom. The factory was overseen and run by George McRoberts. McRoberts and John Downie raised the £24,000 needed to found the company rather than Nobel himself. It was chaired by the Glasgow shipbuilder, Charles Randolph (1809-1878). Ardeer, on the coast at Ayrshire, was chosen for the company's first factory. The business later diversified into the production of blasting gelatine, gelignite, ballistite, guncotton, and cordite. At its peak, the factory employed nearly 13,000 men and women.

In 1926, the firm merged with Brunner, Mond & Company, the United Alkali Company, and the British Dyestuffs Corporation, creating a new group, Imperial Chemical Industries, then one of Britain's largest firms. Nobel Industries continued as the ICI Nobel division of the company.

ICI Ardeer was commonly known locally as the 'factory' or the 'Dinnamite'. At the time the company generally provided higher quality employment regarding terms and conditions and pension rights than other local firms. At its peak, the site employed almost 13,000 workers in a fairly remote location. ICI Ardeer was its own community; with a bank, a travel agency, and a dentist located on the site to provide services to these employees.

The former Western Scottish Bus Company provided tens of buses per day to transport the workers to and from the site, and there were even two trains per day to transport workers to a station within the factory which was used solely for workers and any special visitors with business in the ICI plant, and was never a regular passenger stop. Until the mid-1960s, there were two trains per day to transport workers. Although the line no longer serves the plant, the abandoned platform remains, hidden beneath dense undergrowth.

The factory had its own jetty on the River Garnock in Irvine Harbour serving ships that were delivering explosives that had reached their expiration date, or importing raw materials for the works.

In the late 1960s construction began on a nylon and nitric acid plant, but this had a short life, closing down just 12 years later.

In 2002 the division, now named Nobel Enterprises, was sold to Inabata.

On 8 September 2007 a major fire was reported at the site when 1,500-1,700 tons of nitrocellulose, stored in an open area, caught fire. There was little property damage and no serious injuries.

The site is now a flourishing energetics (explosives) business employing some 300 people as the Scottish division of Chemring Group, an LSE Public Company.

== See also ==
- AkzoNobel
- Nobel Fire Systems
- The Big Idea (museum)
