= George McRoberts =

Scottish chemist (1839–1896)

George McRoberts FRSE FCS (1839–1896) was a Scottish chemist and early explosives expert. He assisted Alfred Nobel in establishing the original Nobel Enterprises dynamite factory at Ardeer. He was a close colleague of Nobel and probably a close friend.

== Life ==
He was born in 1839 in central Scotland the son of John N McRoberts and his wife, Sarah Ogle. He was educated at Falkirk Grammar School.

In 1870 he established a chemical factory at Westquarter in Falkirk, mainly producing sulphuric acid. Alfred Nobel bought the company in 1871 and started making detonators there, mainly for the Scottish coalfields. He was very impressed by McRoberts and in 1873 he moved him to the new British Dynamite Factory in Ardeer, North Ayrshire as its Manager, directly under Alfred Nobel, the first dynamite factory in the world. It was McRoberts and a partner John Downie who raised the £24,000 to build the factory rather than Nobel himself, who was yet to become rich from his invention. The company had its offices at 7 Royal Bank Place in Glasgow. The Chairman of the company was the Glasgow shipbuilder, Charles Randolph.

McRoberts was injured in an explosion during his early years there. He also built a second explosives factory at Pitsea in Essex in 1876.

In 1883 he was elected a Fellow of the Royal Society of Edinburgh his proposers being Sir James Dewar, William Dittmar, John Gray McKendrick and Robert Rattray Tatlock.

He died on 15 January 1896.

== Family ==
He was married to Jane Paton.
