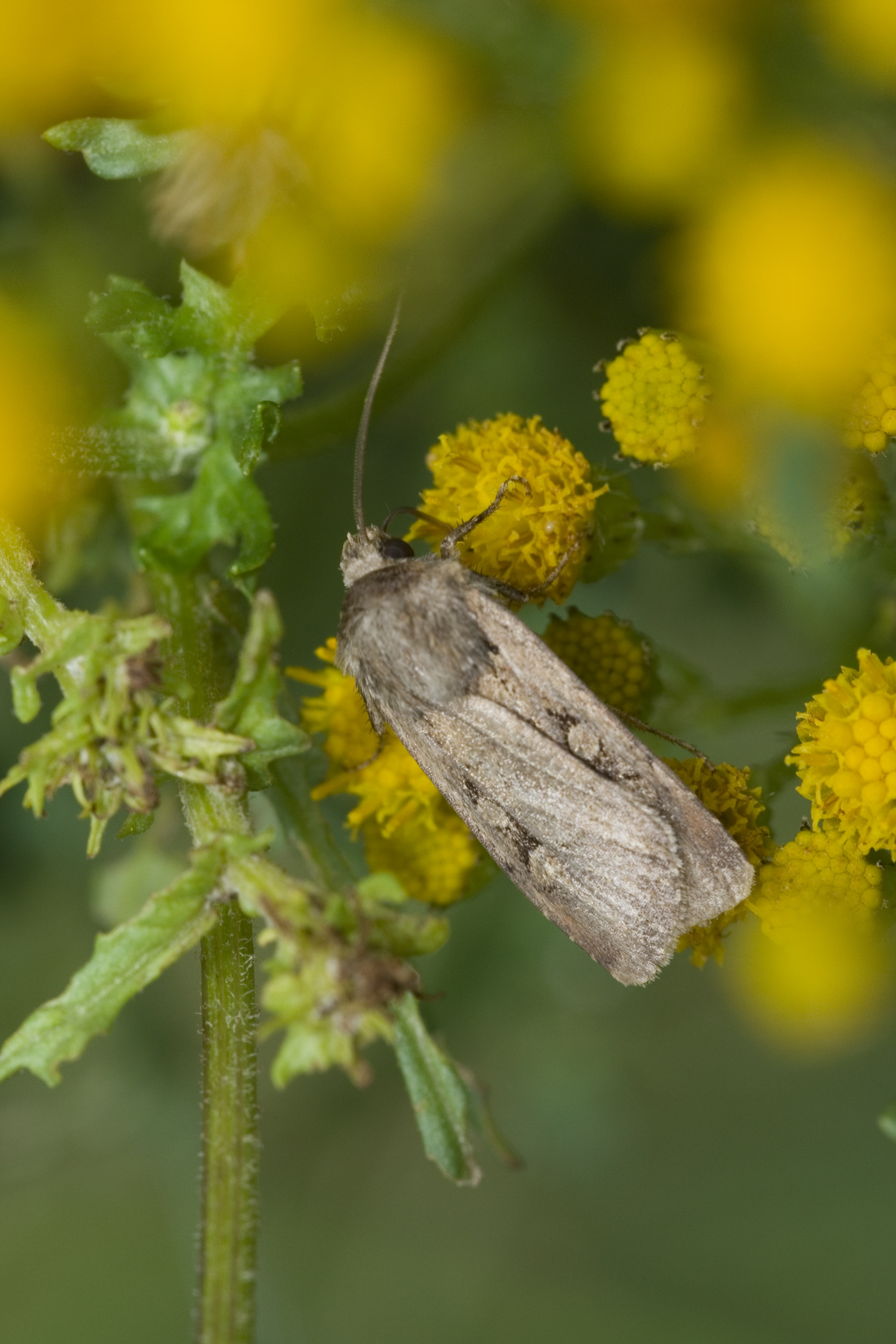

Scientific classification
- Kingdom: Animalia
- Phylum: Arthropoda
- Class: Insecta
- Order: Lepidoptera
- Superfamily: Noctuoidea
- Family: Noctuidae
- Genus: Euxoa
- Species: E. nigrofusca

Binomial name
- Euxoa nigrofusca Linnaeus, 1761

Synonyms
- Euxoa tritici

= Euxoa nigrofusca =

Species of moth

Euxoa nigrofusca, the white-line dart, is a moth of the family Noctuidae. It is found from Europe, to southern Siberia, central Asia to the Pacific Ocean. In North Africa it is known from Morocco and Algeria.

== Description ==
The wingspan is 28–40 mm. Colouring and pattern are extremely variable and hardly a specimen has an identical colouring and pattern. The colour varies from grey-brown to dark grey. The costa is pale and the pattern often obscure. Pale orbicular and reniform. The males have relatively short combed antennae, the female antennae are thread-like. Note that E. nigrofusca may not be a good species. The Euxoa tritici complex consists of five sibling species in Europe: White-linedart Euxoa tritici (Linnaeus, 1761), Euxoa nigrofusca (Esper, 1788), Euxoa eruta (Hübner, 1817), Euxoa diaphora Boursin, 1928 and Euxoa segnilis (Duponchel, 1836). Furthermore, although Fibiger (1997) treated Euxoa montivaga differently it belongs to the E. tritici complex. Differences among the species are subtle, the most important diagnostic characteristics being genitalic. In studies of three of these species, E. tritici, E. nigrofusca and E. eruta, no support was found for the presence of several morphologically distinguishable species with quantitative morphometric analyses.

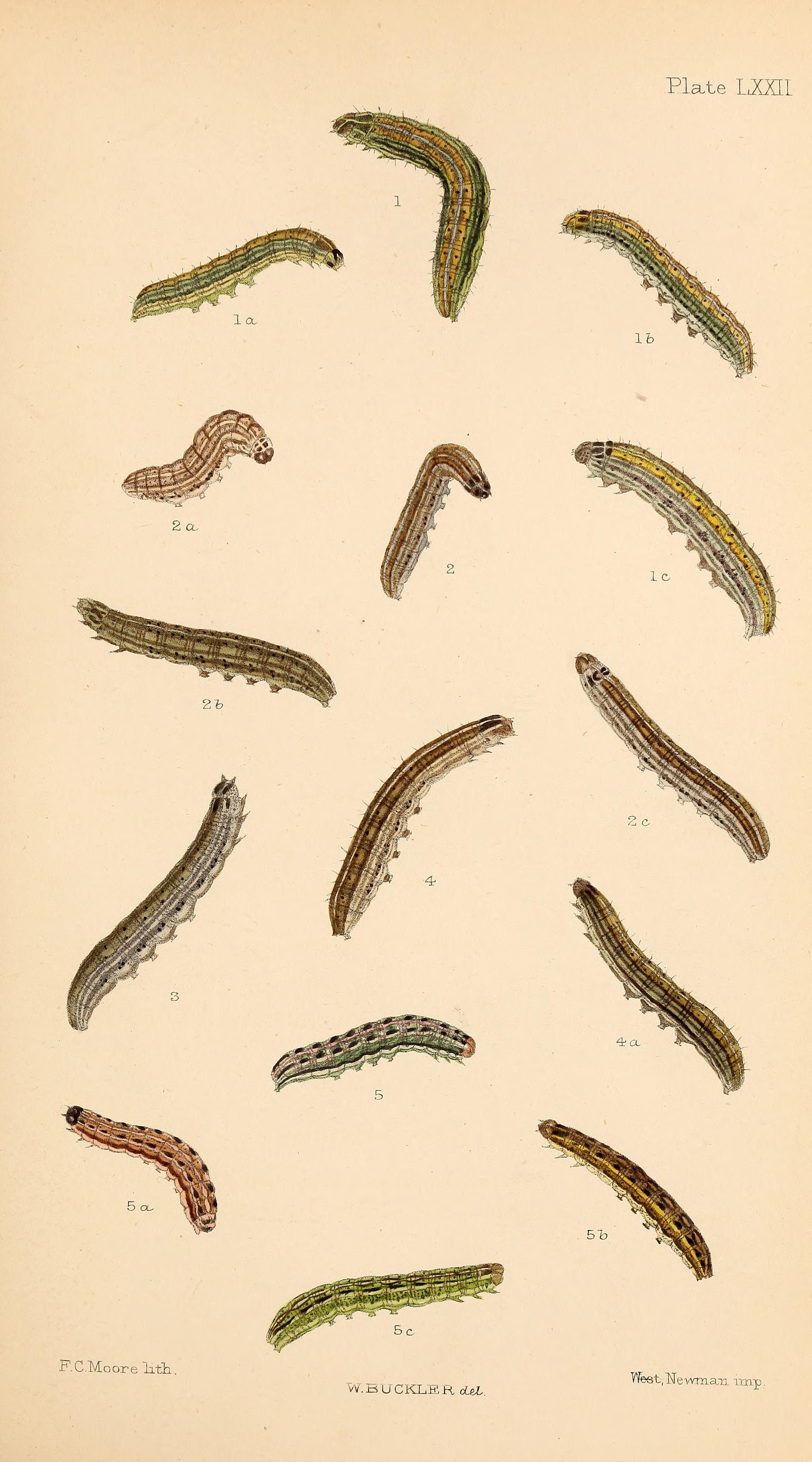
Figs 2,2a,2b, 2c larva after last moult

== Life-cycle ==
The egg is yellowish, without superficial ribs. The caterpillars are yellowish to ochre-colored with a light line on the dorsum and dark laterodorsal lines, which are slightly edged downwards. The lateral stripes are greenish-brown. The pupa is brown-yellow and has a blunt cremaster studded with two pointed thorns. Overwinters as an egg laid on the foodplant, the larvae feed at night partly subterraneous on the roots of Poaceae and a wide range of herbaceous plants such as corn spurrey (Spergula arvensis). This moth flies from June to October depending on the location and there is one generation per year. It can be found on heaths, sand dunes, cliffs and open heaty woodland.
