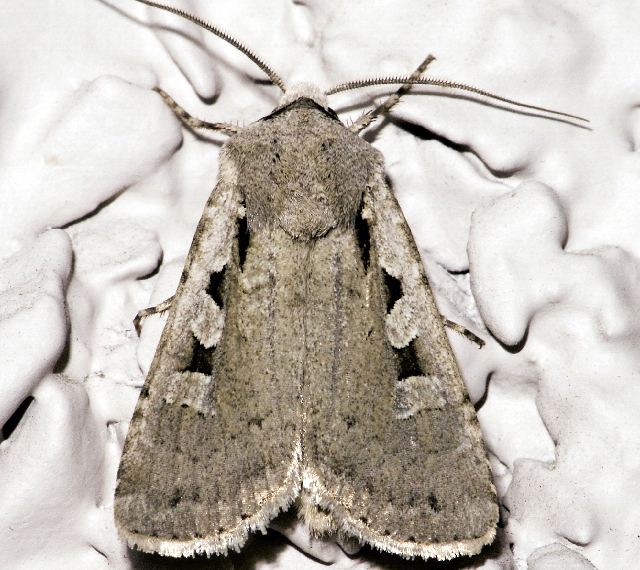

Scientific classification
- Domain: Eukaryota
- Kingdom: Animalia
- Phylum: Arthropoda
- Class: Insecta
- Order: Lepidoptera
- Superfamily: Noctuoidea
- Family: Noctuidae
- Genus: Euxoa
- Species: E. tristicula

Binomial name
- Euxoa tristicula (Morrison, 1876)

Synonyms
- Agrotis tristicula Morrison, 1875; Euxoa nesilens Smith, [1904]

= Euxoa tristicula =

Species of moth

Euxoa tristicula, the early cutworm, is a moth of the family Noctuidae. It was first described by Herbert Knowles Morrison in 1876 and is found in the United States and Canada, where it ranges from southern British Columbia, south through Oregon to central California along the coast.

The wingspan is 38–42 mm. Adults are on wing from late spring to early September.
