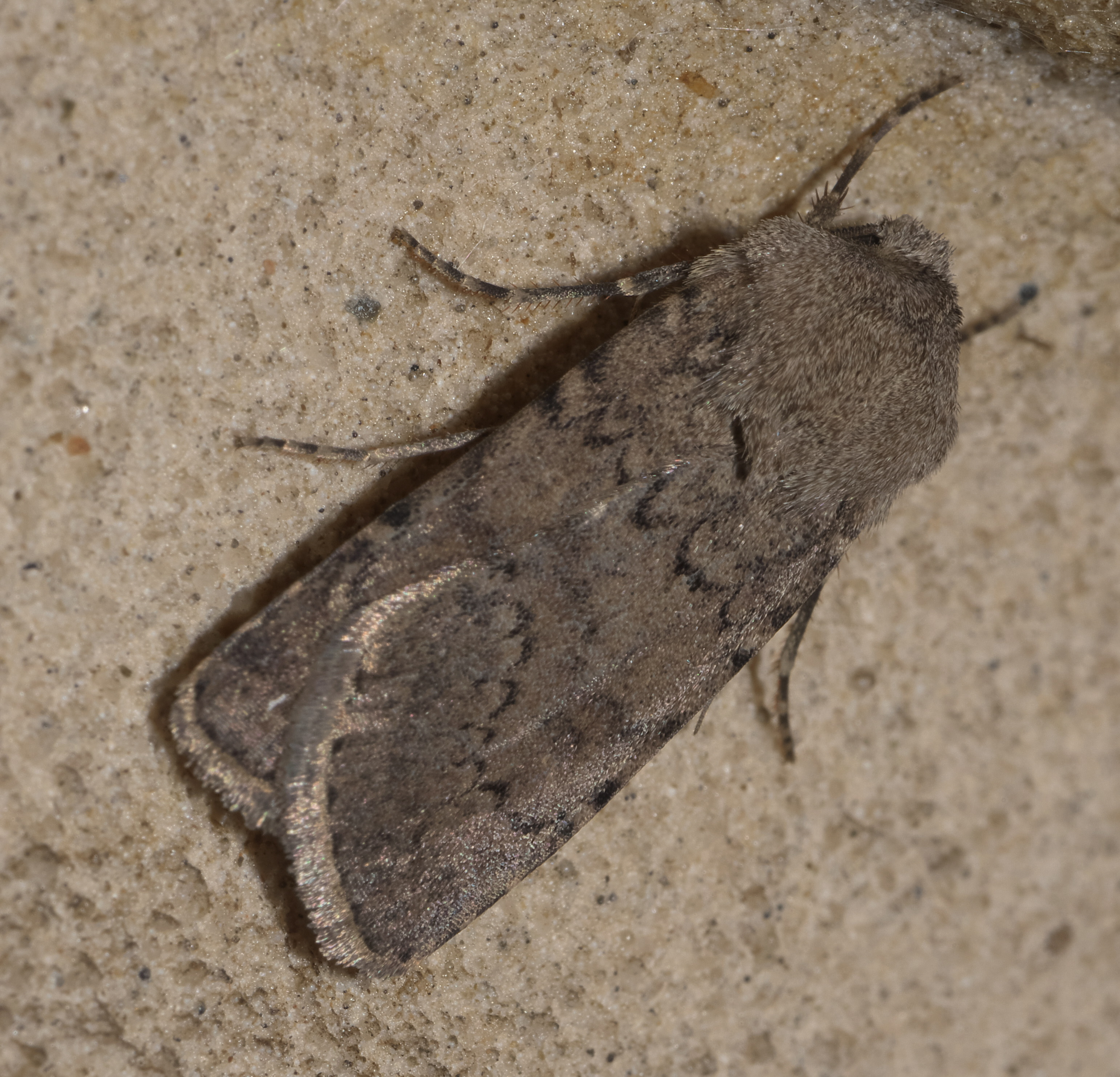

Scientific classification
- Domain: Eukaryota
- Kingdom: Animalia
- Phylum: Arthropoda
- Class: Insecta
- Order: Lepidoptera
- Superfamily: Noctuoidea
- Family: Noctuidae
- Genus: Euxoa
- Species: E. comosa

Binomial name
- Euxoa comosa (Morrison, 1876)

Synonyms
- List: Agrotis comosa Morrison, 1876; Carneades atropulverea Smith, 1900; Carneades ternaria Smith, 1900; Euxoa brunneigera masoni Cockerell, 1905; Euxoa ternaria; Agrotis lutulenta Smith, 1890; Carneades vulpina Smith, 1895; Euxoa brunneigera latebra Benjamin, 1936; Euxoa luteotincta McDunnough, 1940; Euxoa johnstoni McDunnough, 1946; Agrotis annir Strecker, 1898; Carneades dakota Smith, 1900; Euxoa altera McDunnough, 1940; Carneades ontario Smith, 1900; Euxoa vestitura Smith, 1905; Euxoa incallida (Smith, 1890)

= Euxoa comosa =

Species of moth

Euxoa comosa, the hairy euxoa moth, is a moth of the family Noctuidae first described by Herbert Knowles Morrison in 1876. It is found in western North America, except the Pacific coast, ranging east through the northern Great Plains, and in the Hudsonian zone to the Atlantic Ocean. It is found in every province and territory of Canada, except Nunavut.

The wingspan is about 32 mm.

Larvae have been recorded on Secale cereale.

== Subspecies ==
- Euxoa comosa altera (Manitoba, North Dakota)
- Euxoa comosa annir (Colorado, North Dakota, Alberta)
- Euxoa comosa lutulenta (California, Alberta, British Columbia, Oregon)
- Euxoa comosa ontario (Ontario, New Brunswick)
