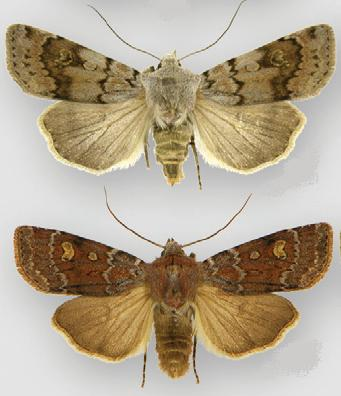
- female (top) female (bottom)

Conservation status
- Unrankable (NatureServe)

Scientific classification
- Kingdom: Animalia
- Phylum: Arthropoda
- Class: Insecta
- Order: Lepidoptera
- Superfamily: Noctuoidea
- Family: Noctuidae
- Genus: Euxoa
- Species: E. chimoensis

Binomial name
- Euxoa chimoensis Hardwick, 1966

= Euxoa chimoensis =

Species of moth

Euxoa chimoensis is a moth of the family Noctuidae. It is found in Quebec, Labrador, and Manitoba (west coast of Hudson Bay).

It has been treated as a subspecies of Euxoa macleani.

Adults have been collected in July. The larvae probably eat leaves, and are probably polyphagous.
