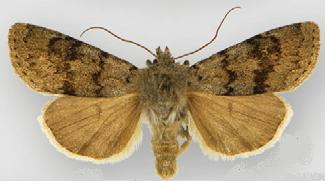
- male

Scientific classification
- Domain: Eukaryota
- Kingdom: Animalia
- Phylum: Arthropoda
- Class: Insecta
- Order: Lepidoptera
- Superfamily: Noctuoidea
- Family: Noctuidae
- Genus: Euxoa
- Species: E. macleani

Binomial name
- Euxoa macleani McDunnough, 1927

= Euxoa macleani =

Species of moth

Euxoa macleani is a moth of the family Noctuidae. It is found in western Canada.

The length of the forewings is 14–18 mm.
