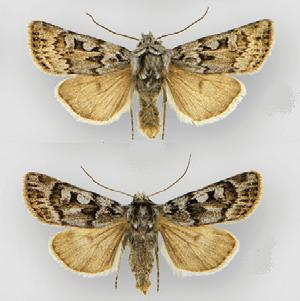
- male (top) female (bottom)

Conservation status
- Unranked (NatureServe)

Scientific classification
- Kingdom: Animalia
- Phylum: Arthropoda
- Clade: Pancrustacea
- Class: Insecta
- Order: Lepidoptera
- Superfamily: Noctuoidea
- Family: Noctuidae
- Genus: Euxoa
- Species: E. churchillensis

Binomial name
- Euxoa churchillensis (McDunnough, 1932)

Synonyms
- Agrotiphila churchillensis McDunnough, 1932

= Euxoa churchillensis =

Species of moth

Euxoa churchillensis, the Churchill euxoa moth, is a moth of the family Noctuidae. It is found in Ontario, Nunavut, the Northern Territories, Yukon, and Manitoba in Canada, and south in the Rocky Mountains in Colorado, USA.

The length of the forewings is 10–13 mm (0.39–0.51 in).
